= Cesare Rinaldi =

Italian poet (1559–1636)

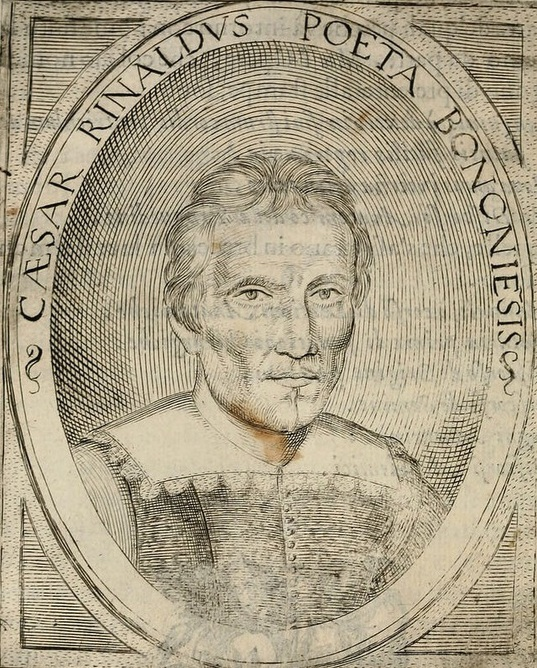
- Portrait of the Italian poet Cesare Rinaldi. From the book "Le glorie degli Incogniti", 1647
- Born: 12 December 1559; Bologna, Papal States
- Died: 6 February 1636 (aged 76); Bologna, Papal States
- Resting place: San Domenico, Bologna
- Occupations: Poet; Writer
- Parent(s): Sebastiano Rinaldi and Faustina Rinaldi (née Cattani)
- Writing career
- Pen name: Neghittoso
- Language: Italian
- Period: 17th century; Baroque literature
- Genres: Poetry; letter
- Notable work: Rime
- Movements: Late Renaissance; Baroque

Cesare Rinaldi (Italian: [ˈtʃeːzare rɪnaldi]; 12 December 1559 – 6 February 1636) an Italian early Baroque poet.

Rinaldi was one of Bologna's most eminent poets. His verse was set to music as madrigals by Salamone Rossi and the circle of the Gonzaga Court at Mantua. He also wrote verse praising composers, such as Alessandro Striggio. During his entire life, Rinaldi intertwined his work as a poet with the frequentation of painters and intellectuals: he was a friend of the Carraccis and Guido Reni and close to Lavinia Fontana, Pietro Faccini, Giovanni Valesio and other contemporary artists.

== Biography ==
Cesare Rinaldi was born in Bologna on 12 December 1559. Ten years older than Marino, Rinaldi was a forerunner of the new concettist and Marinist poets, and perhaps can be best described as a poet poised between a Mannerist style and a new interest in the concetto and the image. He played an important role in transforming the late lyric style of Torquato Tasso into the highly sensuous and conspicuously ingenious poetry for which Marino is famous.

His earliest volume of poems was published in 1588. His verse is characterized by extended metaphors which went well beyond the orthodox Petrarchist canon. His Lettere, published in two different editions in 1617 and 1620, were widely read. Although he did not become a member of the new Accademia dei Gelati, founded in Bologna in 1588 by Melchiorre Zoppio, and did not participate in the polemics and controversies that broke out more than two decades later over Marino's poetry, he had ties of friendship with younger Bolognese poets like Girolamo Preti, Claudio Achillini and Ridolfo Campeggi as well as with Marino. He took an interest in music (Monteverdi, for example) and in art, and acquired works for his “museo”—a large collection that was more on the order of a “Wunderkammer” than a collection primarily devoted to painting and sculpture.

Rinaldi was a member of the Accademia degli Incogniti of Venice and of the Accademia degli Spensierati of Florence. His house in Bologna became a meeting point for writers and artists. He was a friend both to Ludovico and to Agostino Carracci, and he often frequented the Accademia degli Incamminati. He wrote a sonnet for Agostino Carracci's funeral. As Carlo Cesare Malvasia relates, Rinaldi acquired the famous Bacchus and Ariadne from Ludovico Carracci, and his letters indicate that he acted as an intermediary in acquiring pictures for various people, including Marino. In his later years, Rinaldi became a friend and patron of Guido Reni, who gave him his famous Mary Magdalen (now lost), and he wrote several poems in praise of Guido's art.

== Style and legacy ==
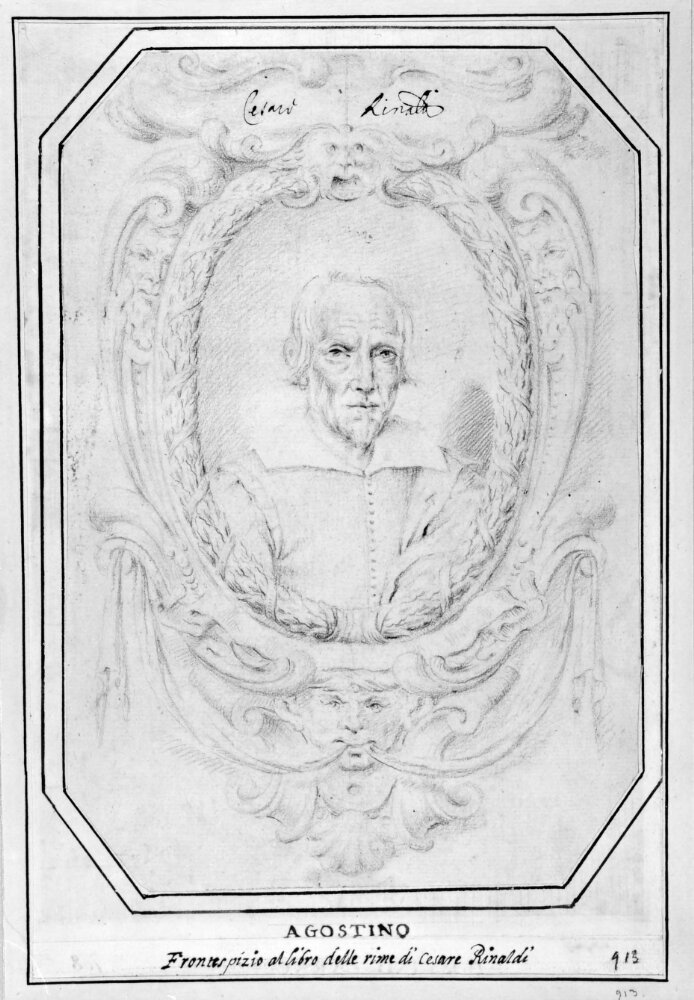
Agostino Carracci, Study for a frontispiece with the portrait of Cesare Rinaldi, Stockholm, Nationalmuseum

Rinaldi played an important role in developing the new poetry of the seventeenth century, notable for its linguistic sophistication, extravagant conceits, and ingenious metaphors. He addressed a sonnet to Guido Reni, for example, only half mockingly requesting a portrait of his lady painted as a mountain of shining ivory in an enamelled dawn, a forest of coral in her lap. Such richly bejewelled metaphors are characteristic of the period. An example from religious lyric is an image of the penitent Magdalen tossing away her pearls only to see them transformed into the tears of repentance welling up in her eyes.

== Works ==
- Rinaldi, Cesare (1598). Delle rime di Cesare Rinaldi bolognese: parte sesta al sereniss. Sig. don Cesare d'Este duca di Modona. Bologna: Gio. Rossi.
- Rinaldi, Cesare (1601). Canzoniere di Cesare Rinaldi bolognese all'ill.mo et reuerendiss.mo mons.r Giuliano della Rouere. Bologna: per gli her. di Gio. Rossi.
- Rime del Signor Cesare Rinaldi Bolognese, il Neghittoso, Accademico Spensierato, con nuova aggiunta dedicate all'Illustrissimo, ed Eccellentissimo Signore, il Signor Sigismondo Miscoschi Gonzaga, Marchese di Mirova, supremo Maresciallo del Regno di Polonia. Venice: presso Bernardo Giunti, e Gio. Battista Ciotti, e Compagni. 1608.
- Rinaldi, Cesare (1617). Lettere di Cesare Rinaldi il Neghittoso Accademico Spensierato. All'Illustrissimo Reverendissimo Signore, il Signor Cardinal d'Este. Venice: appresso Tommaso Baglioni.

== Lyrics set as madrigals ==
- Donna se voi m'odiate - set by Alfonso Ferrabosco
- Per non mi dir ch'io moia - set by Michelangelo Rossi

== Bibliography ==
- «Cesare Rinaldi bolognese». In : Le glorie de gli Incogniti: o vero, Gli huomini illustri dell'Accademia de' signori Incogniti di Venetia, In Venetia : appresso Francesco Valuasense stampator dell'Accademia, 1647, pp. 100–103 (on-line).
- Fantuzzi, Giovanni (1789). Notizie degli scrittori bolognesi. Bologna: stamperia di S. Tommaso d'Aquino. pp. 187–189.
- Ritrovato, Salvatore (2005). Per te non di te canto. I madrigali di Cesare Rinaldi. Manziana: Vecchiarelli. ISBN 9788882471415.
- Ritrovato, Salvatore (2016). "RINALDI, Cesare". Dizionario Biografico degli Italiani (in Italian). Vol. 87: Renzi–Robortello. Rome: Istituto dell'Enciclopedia Italiana. ISBN 978-88-12-00032-6.
- Morselli, Raffaella; Iseppi, Giulia (2019). "Un poeta tra i pittori : Cesare Rinaldi nell'ecfrastica Bologna tra Cinque e Seicento". L'Ellisse. 14 (2): 227–252. doi:10.48255/J.LELLIS.14.II.2019.12.
- Forni, Giorgio (2021). "Cesare Rinaldi, Guido Reni e l'ecfrasi del moderno". Quaderns d'Italià. 26: 145–170. doi:10.5565/rev/qdi.511. ISSN 2014-8828. S2CID 244887814.
