= Accademia dei Gelati =

Italian academy founded in 1588

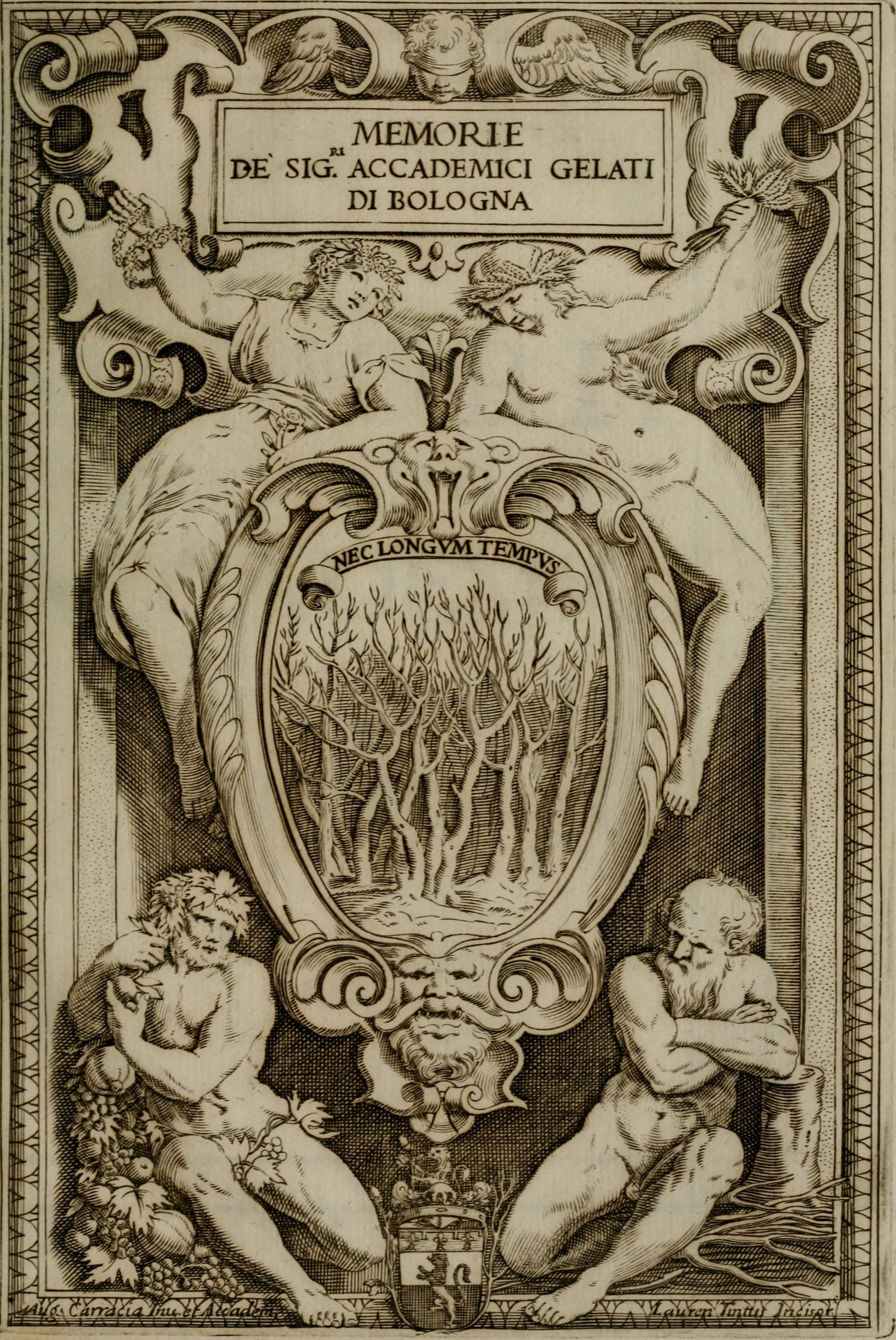
- Coat of Arms
- Abbreviation: I Gelati (“the Frozen Ones”)
- Formation: 1588
- Dissolved: 1786
- Headquarters: Bologna, Papal States
- Official language: Italian
- Remarks: Motto: Nec longum tempus ("It is not a long time")

The Accademia dei Gelati (Academy of the Frozen) was a learned society of intellectuals, mainly noblemen, that significantly influenced the cultural and political life of Baroque Bologna. It is considered one of the most important 17th-century Italian academies.

== History ==
The Accademia dei Gelati was founded in Bologna in 1588 by a group of young gentlemen associated with the university led by Melchiorre Zoppio. Its members gathered at Zoppio's house, in a marvelous room with a theater and a rich library. Zoppio was one of the Academy's keenest members, adopting the name Caliginoso within it and leaving it a room for its meetings in his will.

The name of the Academy refers to the academicians belief that their literary conversations would "enflame" their "frozen" intellects.

The subjects of the first meetings were love poetry and the Neoplatonic philosophy of love. Later, the Academy developed a great interest in philosophy. Following Plato's philosophical gatherings, the academicians discussed the most subtle philosophical issues after a friendly dinner. They called these meetings "Cene de' saggi" (dinners of wise men).

Influenced by the example of Bologna’s senior poet, Cesare Rinaldi, the Gelati quickly published two verse anthologies, Ricreazioni amorose (1590) and Rime (1597), which were early landmarks in the transition from Petrarchism to Conceptismo. Their verse is characterized by extended metaphors which went well beyond the orthodox Petrarchist canon.

As has recently been recognized, the poets of the Gelati, and Rinaldi especially, played an important role in transforming the late lyric style of Torquato Tasso into the sensuous and ingenious poetry for which Marino is famous, and it was in Bologna that Marino first encountered many of the imaginative techniques that he developed in his own poetry.

Subsequently, led by Claudio Achillini and Ridolfo Campeggi, the Gelati championed the poetry of Giambattista Marino. Their own later production included much religious verse and tended to the moderate Baroque style typified by another academician, Girolamo Preti.

They published biographies of their leading members as Memorie imprese, e ritratti de' Signori Accademici Gelati (1670), and were also involved as theorists in the development of Bolognese Baroque painting. The Academy had close links with many of the most important Bolognese artists of the day. During Agostino Carracci's funeral in Bologna, it was Lucio Faberio, a member of the Academy, who delivered the funeral oration. The laws of the Accademia dei Gelati were published for the first time in 1670.

== Members ==
- Giovanni Battista Agucchi
- Francesco Albergati Capacelli
- Filippo Argelati
- Camillo Baldi
- Francesco Balducci
- Andrea Barbazza (Il Ritroso)
- Francesco Barberini (Il Rinvigorito)
- Giuseppe Battista (L'Assiderato)
- Nicolò Beregan
- Pietro Antonio Bernardoni
- Giovanni Francesco Bonomi (L'Affaticato)
- Giovanni Cinelli Calvoli
- Ridolfo Campeggi (Il Rugginoso)
- Alberto Caprara (Il Sincero)
- Ferdinando Cospi (Il Fedele)
- Lorenzo Crasso (Il Costante)
- Girolamo Desideri (L'Indifferente)
- Paolo Gagliardi
- Berlinghiero Gessi (Il Sollecito)
- Giovanbattista Gornia (Il Rinforzato)
- Girolamo Graziani (L'Impedito)
- Giovanni Battista Guarini
- Carlo Alessandro Guidi
- Alfonso Litta (L'Imperturbabile)
- Carlo Cesare Malvasia (L'Ascoso)
- Cornelio Malvasia (Il Difeso)
- Virgilio Malvezzi (L'Esposto)
- Eustachio Manfredi
- Carlo Antonio Manzini (L'Errante)
- Luigi Manzini
- Ferdinando Marescalchi
- Anton Felice Marsili (L'Instabile)
- Ovidio Montalbani (L'Innestato)
- Geminiano Montanari (L'Elevatoso)
- Antonio Muscettola (Lo 'nfecondo)
- Pio Enea II Obizzi (Il Regenerato)
- Matteo Peregrini
- Francesco Pona (L'Incurvato)
- Girolamo Preti (L'Essercitato)
- Giambattista Roberti
- Antonio Maria Salvini
- Francesco Maria Santinelli
- Johann Ludwig Schönleben (Il Ritirato)
- Fulvio Testi
- Carlo Emmanuele Vizzani
- Melchiorre Zoppio (Il Caliginoso)

== Bibliography ==
- Slawinski, M. (2002). "Gelati, Accademia dei". The Oxford Companion to Italian Literature. Oxford University Press. ISBN 978-0-19-818332-7.
- Tiraboschi, Girolamo (1824). Storia della letteratura italiana. Vol. VII. Milan: Società Tipografica de' Classici Italiani.
- Avellini, L. (1982). "Tra Umoristi e Gelati: l'Accademia romana e la cultura emiliana del primo e del pieno Seicento". Studi secenteschi. 23: 109–137.
- Gardi, Andrea (2011). "Riflessioni sui primi Gelati (1588-1598)" (PDF). In Andrea Csillaghy; Antonella Riem Natale; Milena Romero Allué; Roberta De Giorgi; Andrea Del Ben; Lisa Gasparotto (eds.). Un tremore di foglie. Scritti e studi in ricordo di Anna Panicali. Forum. pp. 423–434. ISBN 978-88-8420-666-4.
- Gurreri, Clizia, Dentro l'Accademia dei Gelati. Simboli, imprese ed emblemi a Palazzo Zoppio, in B. Alfonzetti, G. Baldassarri e F. Tomasi (a cura di), I cantieri dell'italianistica. Ricerca, didattica e organizzazione agli inizi del XXI secolo, Atti del XVII congresso dell'ADI – Associazione degli Italianisti (Roma Sapienza, 18-21 settembre 2013), Roma, Adi editore, 2014, pp. 1-6 ("online" (PDF). Archived from the original (PDF) on 11 May 2021.).
- Gurreri, Clizia (2016). "Nec longum tempus': L'Accademia dei Gelati tra XVI e XVII secolo (1588–1614)". The Italian Academies 1525-1700. Networks of Culture, Innovation and Dissent. Taylor & Francis: 186–196. ISBN 9781317196303.
- Testa, Simone (2016). "Italian Academies and their 'Facebooks'". The Italian Academies 1525-1700. Networks of Culture, Innovation and Dissent. Taylor & Francis: 197–213. ISBN 9781317196303.
