= Ovidio Montalbani =

Italian polymath (1601–1671)

Doctor of Medicine Ovidio Montalbani
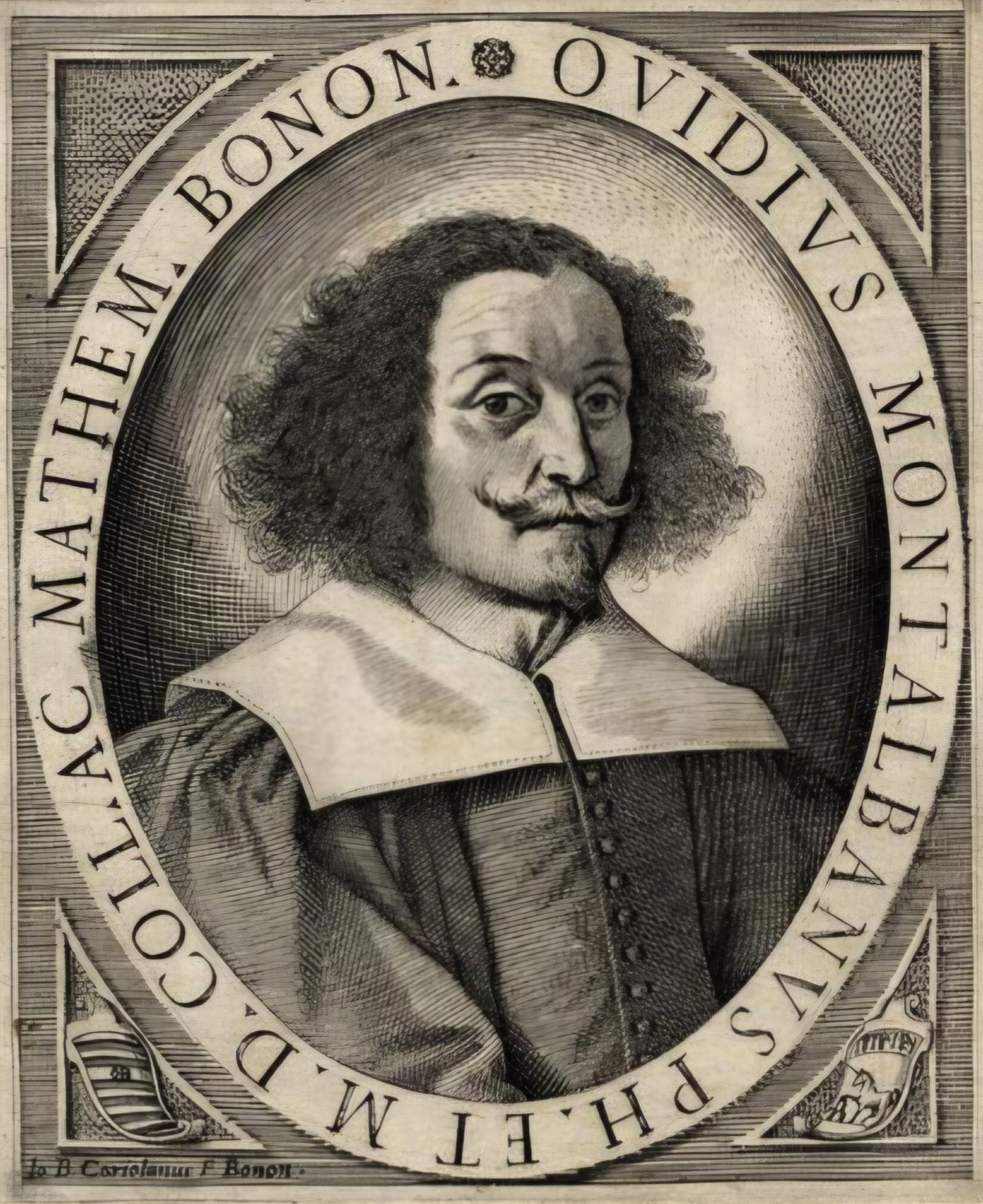
- Engraved portrait of Ovidio Montalbani by Giovanni Battista Coriolano
- Born: 18 November 1601; Bologna, Papal States
- Died: 20 September 1671 (aged 69); Bologna, Papal States
- Resting place: San Francesco, Bologna
- Other name: Giovanni Antonio Bumaldi
- Occupations: mathematician, physicist, astronomer, historian, dialectologist
- Spouses: Pantasilea Canonici (m. 1632, died) Giulia Banzi (m. 1649, died) Ginevra Gessi (m. 1650)
- Parent(s): Bartolomeo Montalbani and Giulia Montalbani (née Gibetti)

Academic background
- Education: University of Bologna
- Doctoral advisor: Vincenzo Montecalvi; Bartolomeo Ambrosini
- Influences: Ulisse Aldrovandi; Fortunio Liceti

Academic work
- Discipline: Physician, botanist, astronomer, astrologist
- Institutions: University of Bologna
- Doctoral students: Lorenzo Legati
- Influenced: Jean-François Séguier

Ovidio Montalbani (18 November 1601 – 20 September 1671), also known by his pseudonym Giovanni Antonio Bumaldi, was an Italian polymath. He was a professor of logic, mathematics, astronomy, and medicine at the University of Bologna.

== Life ==
Ovidio Montalbani studied philosophy with Vincenzo Montecalvi and medicine with the famous physician Bartolomeo Ambrosini. In 1625 at a very young age he became a lector at the University of Bologna, teaching first logic, then the theoretic medicine, mathematics and astronomy and later moral philosophy. In 1657, he became custodian of the Aldrovandi Museum - succeeding Bartolomeo Ambrosini, who had been custodian since 1642. He was the doyen of the Collegio Medico of Bologna and its prior from 1664 onwards.

Montalbani was a member of several academies, including the Accademia dei Gelati (with the alias "l'Innestato"), the Accademia degli Indomiti (as "lo Stellato"), and the Accademia della Notte (as "il Rugiadoso"). He was also a member of the free-thinking Venetian Accademia degli Incogniti, as well as one of the founders of the Accademia dei Vespertini, which held its first Assemblies in his house.

A politically involved citizen of the city of Bologna, he held several magistrates, such as those of the court of the merchant forum and Tribune of the Plebs. As a censor for the Bolognese Inquisition he was charged of reviewing the first edition of Galileo’s Complete Works, published in Bologna by Carlo Manolessi, in 1655–1656.

Montalbani died in Bologna on 20 September 1671. He was buried in his family chapel in San Francesco, Bologna.

== Works ==
Ovidio Montalbani was one of the most prolific polymaths of his day. Among his many publications can be found works on archaeology, linguistics, medicine and botany. In 1629 he was given the task of writing the Tacuino, a sort of annually produced astrological calendar for doctors indicating the best and worst days for blood-letting, purges and surgery. Montalbani often enriched this medical «almanac» with essays on subjects as diverse as the grafting of plants and the Bolognese and Lombard dialects. Montalbani's tacuinum of 1661, entitled, Antineotiologia, an attack on innovations in the practice of medicine, was harshly criticized by Marcello Malpighi and Giovanni Alfonso Borelli.

In his “De Illuminabili Lapide Bononiensi Epistola” (1634), Montalbani discussed the properties of the “Bologna stone” a piece of barium sulfate (baryte) found on Mount Paderno. Montalbani's treatise was one of the first studies on the subject of inorganic phosphorescence. In 1668 Montalbani edited the previously unprinted Dendrologia by Ulisse Aldrovandi.

Montalbani published a number of scientific works under the pseudonym of Giovanni Antonio Bumaldi. Carl Peter Thunberg gave the name of Bumalda to a genus of Japanese plants.

A close friend of Thomas Dempster, he pronounced his funeral oration, which was published in Bologna in 1626, a year after Dempster's death.

Montalbani is an ambivalent figure in the early seventeenth-century Scientific Revolution. While he was a proponent of empirical observation in natural philosophy, he was also a staunch opponent of Marcello Malpighi’s medical ideas and a proponent of the Ptolemaic system.

== Main works ==
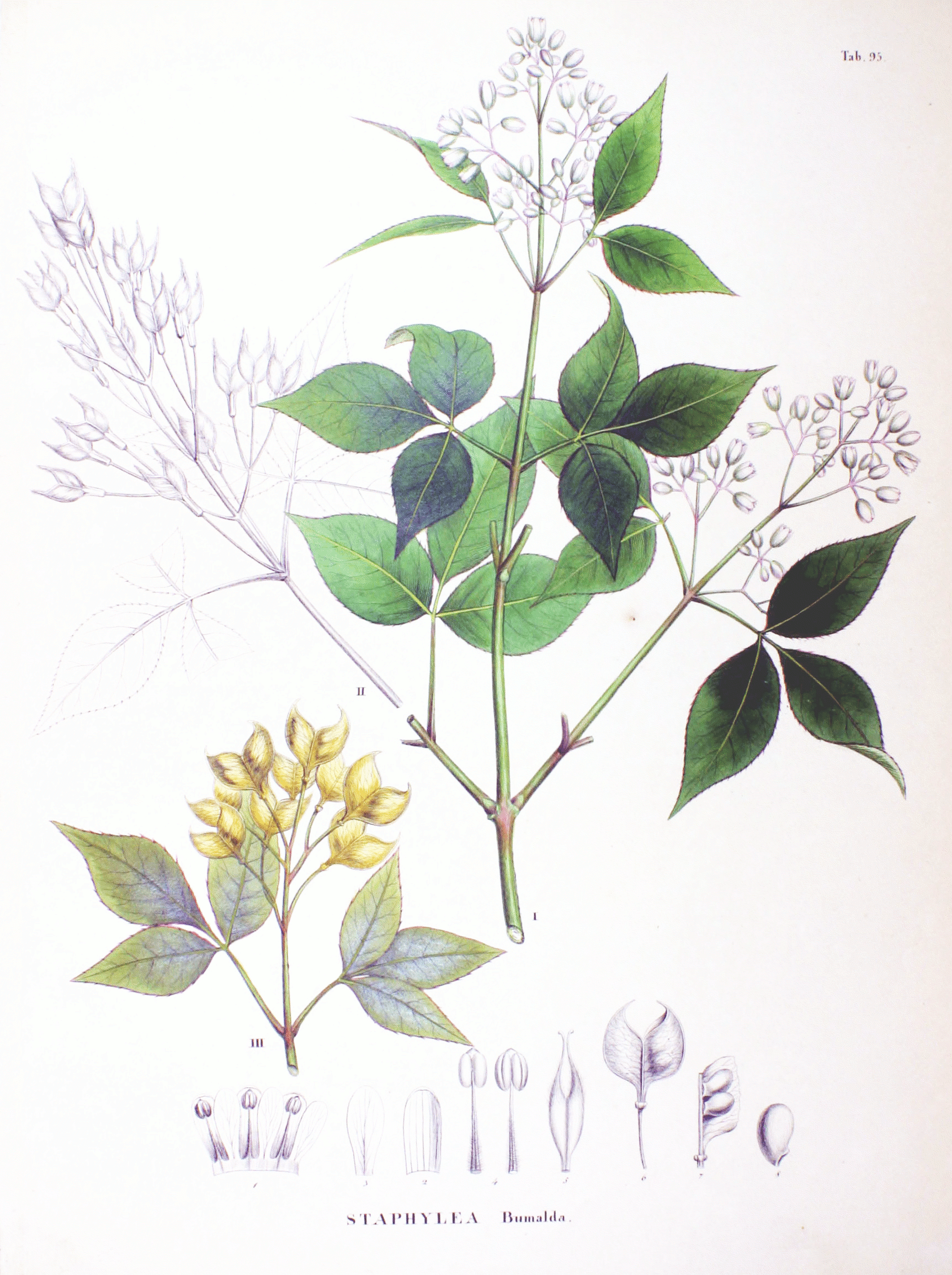
An engraved plate of Bumalda, the genus of plants named after Ovidio Montalbani, aka Johannes Antonius Bumaldus, by the Swedish naturalist Carl Peter Thunberg

=== Aldrovandine ===
- (Editing), Dendrologiae naturalis scilicet arborum historiae libri duo, Bologna 1668 (online).

=== Miscellaneous ===
- Index omnium plantarum exsiccatarum et cartis agglutinatarum, quæ in proprio musæo conspiciuntur (in Latin). Bononiae. 1624.
- Speculum Euclidianum (in Latin). Bononiae: Clemente Ferroni. 1629.
- De illuminabili lapide Bononiensi epistola (in Latin). Bononiae. 1634.
- Epistolæ variæ ad eruditos viros de rebus in Bononiensi tractu indigenis, ut est lapis illuminabilis et lapis specularis (in Latin). Bononiae. 1634.
- Clarorum aliquot doctorum Bononiensium elogialia cenotaphia (in Latin). Bononiae. 1640.
- Drosilogia (in Italian). Bologna: Giovanni Battista Ferroni. 1641.
- Helioscopia (in Latin). Bologna: Carlo Zenero. 1650.
- Formulario economico cibario e medicinale di materie più facili, e di minor costo, altretanto buone e valevoli quanto le più pretiose (in Italian). Bologna. 1654.
- Diceosilogia (in Italian). Bologna: Giacomo Monti. 1655.
- Bibliotheca botanica seu herbaristarum scriptorum promota synodia (in Latin). Bononiae. 1657. The French botanist Jean-François Séguier highly praised this book and included a reprint of it as an appendix to his own Bibliotheca botanica of 1740.
- Agatochnea (in Italian). Bologna: Giacomo Monti. 1658.
- Hortus botanographicus herbarum ideas, et facies supra bis mille Autotatas Perpetuam, & facillimam immense cognitionis botanicarum differentiarum ad memoriam (in Latin). Bologna: Giacomo Monti. 1660.
- Vocabolista Bolognese; nel quale, con recondite historie e curiose eruditioni, si dimostra il parlare più antico della madre de studj come madrelingua d'Italia (in Italian). Bologna. 1660.

== Bibliography ==
- «Ovidio Montalbani Bolognese». In : Le glorie de gli Incogniti: o vero, Gli huomini illustri dell'Accademia de' signori Incogniti di Venetia, In Venetia : appresso Francesco Valuasense stampator dell'Accademia, 1647, pp. 356–359 (on-line).
- Ghilini, Girolamo (1647). Teatro d'huomini letterati (in Italian). Vol. II. Venice: Guerigli. p. 206.
- Zani, Valerio (1672). Memorie imprese, e ritratti de' signori Accademici Gelati di Bologna (in Italian). Bologna: Manolessi. pp. 350–353.
- Orlandi, Pellegrino Antonio (1714). Notizie degli scrittori bolognesi (in Italian). Bologna: Costantino Pisarri. pp. 222–223.
- Fantuzzi, Giovanni (1786). Notizie degli scrittori bolognesi (in Italian). Vol. VI. Bologna: Stamp. di San Tommaso d'Aquino. pp. 57–64.
- Muzzi, S. (1844). "Memorie dei Montalbani in S. Francesco e specialmente del famosissimo Ovidio". Eletta dei monumenti più illustri e classici, sepolcrali ed onorari di Bologna e suoi dintorni compresi gli antichi del cimitero. IV. Bologna.
- Antonio Neviani, Le Curae analyticae di Ovidio Montalbani Spigolatura aldrovandiana, in Atti della Pontificia Accademia delle scienze nuovi Lincei, LXXXVII, sess. IV, Civitate Vaticana [1934], pp. 267–272;
- Sorbelli, Albano (1938). "Il "tacuinus" dell'Università di Bologna e le sue prime edizioni". Gutenberg Jahrbuch: 109–114.
- Bignardi, Agostino (1967). "Per la storia dell'agricoltura bolognese. Gli almanacchi rurali di Ovidio Montalbani". Economia e Storia. XIV: 167–184.
- Foresti, Fabio (1981). "Il "Vocabolista bolognese" di Ovidio Montalbani e l'etimologia dialettale nel '600". Etimologia e lessico dialettale. Atti del XII Convegno per gli studi dialettali italiani, Macerata … 1979. Pisa: 237–246.
- Scappini, Cristiana; Torricelli, Maria Pia (1993). Sandra Tugnoli Pattaro (ed.). Lo studio Aldrovandi in Palazzo Pubblico (1617-1742) (in Italian). Bologna: CLUEB. p. 206.
- Marchi, Roberto (2000). "Ovidio Montalbani e Giordano Bruno, teoria del minimo e aspetti della cultura matematica, medica e astrologica nella Bologna del '600". Bruniana e Campanelliana: Ricerche Filosofiche e Materiali Storico-testuali. VI (2): 554–560. JSTOR 24331747.
