= Andrea Barbazza =

Italian Marinist poet and literary critic

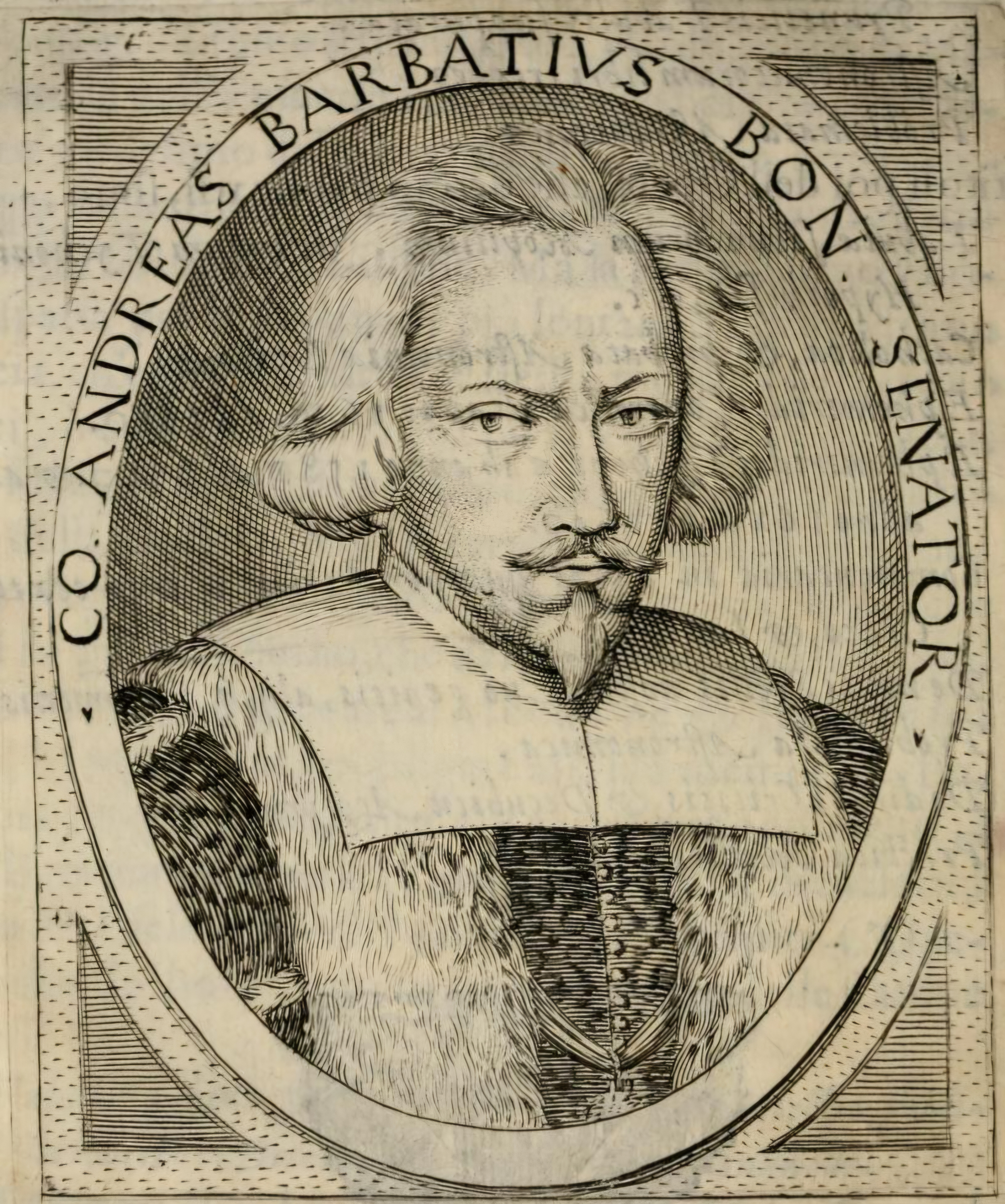
- Portrait of Andrea Barbazza from the book "Le glorie degli Incogniti", 1647
- Born: c. 1582; Bologna, Papal States
- Died: 7 August 1656 (aged 73–74); Bologna, Papal States
- Occupations: Poet; intellectual; civil servant
- Spouses: Bianca Bentivoglio (m. 1614; died 1629) Silvia Boccaferri (m. 1648)
- Children: 3
- Father: Bartolomeo Barbazza
- Writing career
- Pen name: Robusto Pogomega
- Language: Italian language
- Period: 17th century; Baroque
- Genres: Poetry; drama; treatise
- Literary movement: Baroque; Marinism

Andrea Barbazza (1581/2 – 7 August 1656) was an Italian Marinist poet and literary critic.

== Biography ==
He was born of a noble family in Bologna between 1581 and 1582. Between 1611 and 1613, Barbazza was first ‘maestro di camera’ and after ‘primo cameriere’ of cardinal Ferdinando Gonzaga. After a long stay in Rome (1624-1632), he settled permanently in his native Bologna, where he occupied important legal and administrative offices. He was an expert on the code of chivalry and on questions of honour.

On 26 April 1614 he married Countess Bianca Bentivoglio, granddaughter of Bianca Cappello, by whom he had a son, Ferdinando. In 1648, after the death of his first wife, he married Countess Silvia Boccaferri, by whom he had two sons, Filippo and Bartolomeo.

Barbazza was a member of the Accademia dei Gelati of Bologna, the Accademia degli Incogniti of Venice and the Accademia degli Umoristi of Rome. He was decorated with the Order of Saint Michael by Marie de' Medici in 1612.

== Works ==
Barbazza was a friend and correspondent of Claudio Achillini, Angelico Aprosio, Pietro Della Valle, Giambattista Basile and Giambattista Marino. Marino stayed often with him during his stays in Bologna. Barbazza defended the poetry of Marino against the attacks of Tommaso Stigliani in his Strigliate (Scoldings), published in 1629 with the jocular pseudonym of Robusto Pogomega. He wrote also the pastoral dramas L'Amorosa Costanza and L'Armidoro (1646), and a number of lyrics published in contemporary anthologies.

== List of works ==
- Le Strigliate a Tommaso Stigliani del Signor Robusto Pogommega, dedicate all'Eminentiss. e Reverendiss. Sig. Cardinale Piermaria Borghese. In Spira: appresso Henrico Starckio. 1629.
- Canzone in morte della Contessa Bianca Bentivoglj. In Bologna. 1631.
- L'Amorosa Costanza fauola tragicomica boschereccia del co. Andrea Barbazzi senatore in Bologna. In Bologna: per Giacomo Monti. 1646.
- L'Armidoro, Favola Pastorale. In Bologna. 1646.

== Bibliography ==
- Mazzucchelli, Giammaria (1758). Gli Scrittori d'Italia. Vol. II, 1. Brescia. pp. 287–289.
- Albertazzi, Adolfo (1923). "Il cav. Barbazza poeta e marito". Il Secolo. XX, XXII (6): 410–414.
- De Blasi, Nicola (1964). "BARBAZZA, Andrea". Dizionario Biografico degli Italiani (in Italian). Vol. 6: Baratteri–Bartolozzi. Rome: Istituto dell'Enciclopedia Italiana. OCLC 883370.
- Slawinski, M. (2002). "Barbazza, Andrea". The Oxford Companion to Italian Literature. Oxford University Press. ISBN 978-0-19-818332-7.
- Riga, Pietro Giulio (2015). "Polemiche e sodalità intorno a Marino. Le "Strigliate" di Andrea Barbazza". Studi secenteschi. LVI: 103–116.
