= Girolamo Preti =

Italian Baroque poet (1582–1626)

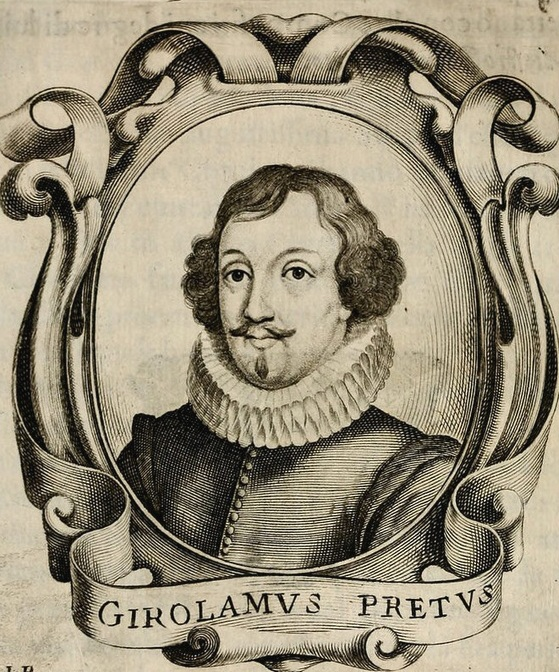
- Portrait of Girolamo Preti. From the book "Le glorie degli Incogniti", 1647
- Born: 1582; Bologna, Papal States
- Died: 6 April 1626 (aged 43–44); Barcelona, Kingdom of Spain
- Education: University of Bologna
- Occupations: Poet; Intellectual
- Writing career
- Language: Italian language
- Period: 17th century; Baroque literature
- Genres: Poetry; treatise
- Notable work: La Salmace
- Literary movement: Baroque; Marinism

Girolamo Preti (1582 — 6 April 1626) was an Italian Baroque poet. He is considered one of the most accomplished of early 17th-century poets.

== Biography ==
Born in Bologna in 1582, he was destined for a legal career, but broke off his studies to devote himself to literature. He became a member of the Bolognese Accademia dei Gelati, founded in 1588 by Melchiorre Zoppio, and became friends with the poet Cesare Rinaldi. In 1609, he was made member of the Accademia degli Umoristi. He became friends with Girolamo Aleandro, Antonio Bruni, Alessandro Tassoni and other members of the Academy. In 1611 Preti was charged by cardinal Federico Borromeo to purchase volumes for the newly founded Biblioteca Ambrosiana. Later he put himself at the service of Cardinal Carlo Emanuele Pio di Savoia and then of Alessandro Ludovisi (the future Pope Gregory XV). Preti was one of the few concettisti to find favour in the Rome of Pope Urban VIII; he served as secretary to Cardinal Francesco Barberini, and was accompanying him on a Spanish embassy when he died suddenly in the spring of 1626.

== Works ==
Preti was a very successful poet. His poems, which were first printed in Venice in 1614, were reprinted eight times during the first half of the 17th century (Venice 1624 and 1656; Bologna 1618, 1620, 1631 and 1644; Milan 1619; Rome 1625; Macerata 1646). His idyll La Salmace was translated into French, Spanish, English and Latin. In 1647 a translation into English of Oronta di Cipro was made by Thomas Stanley as Oronta, the Cyprian Virgin. It was published in several editions through 1651. He is best known for his idylls, a genre which he established with the mythological Salmace of 1609, inspired by a story in the fourth book of Ovid's Metamorphoses, and then extended to more straightforwardly amorous subjects. His lyric Poesie (1614) is characterized by a cautious yet original adaptation of the models offered by Giambattista Marino, whom he knew from the early 1600s, when Marino was a frequent visitor to Bologna. He makes moderate use of complex metaphors and acutezze, inclining to a gently sensuous style, which captures physical detail (his description of the nymph Salmacis bathing is exemplary), while avoiding the more intense and disturbing erotic charge to be found in Marino. His ideas were similarly conservative: in his brief treatise Intorno all’onestà della poesia (1618) he reasserts the Renaissance Neoplatonist view of the moral functions of love poetry. Like many other of Marino’s friends, he was perplexed by L’Adone.

== Preti and Marino ==
Preti's sonnet, 'Penna immortal...', proclaims his poetic debt to Marino, and his description of the mechanism of a clock is a famous example of the Marinist liking for difficult and unconventional subjects. But despite some stylistic flamboyance, he deplored the voluptuous tone in Marino and cultivated instead a more sentimental strain. His tenuous spirituality has made him appear to some as a precursor of the Arcadian reaction against Baroque excesses.

== Bibliography ==
- Slawinski, M. (2002). "Preti, Girolamo". The Oxford Companion to Italian Literature. Oxford University Press. ISBN 978-0-19-818332-7.
- Riga, Pietro Giulio (2011). "Un esempio secentesco di moralità letteraria: il Discorso intorno all'onestà della poesia di Girolamo Preti". Studi (E testi) italiani: Semestrale del Dipartimento di Italianistica e Spettacolo. 27 (1): 75–91. doi:10.1400/202535.
- Ferro, Roberta (2012). "Girolamo Preti a Roma: le lettere a Federico Borromeo (1611-1612)". Aevum. 86 (3): 1031–1070. JSTOR 23414273.
- Arnaudo, Marco (2012). "Il doppio e lo specchio nella "Salmace" di Girolamo Preti". Italica. 92 (2): 484–495. JSTOR 43895978.
- Ferro, Roberta (2016). "PRETI, Girolamo". Dizionario Biografico degli Italiani (in Italian). Vol. 85: Ponzone–Quercia. Rome: Istituto dell'Enciclopedia Italiana. ISBN 978-88-12-00032-6.
