= Ridolfo Campeggi =

Italian poet, librettist, and playwright (1565–1624)

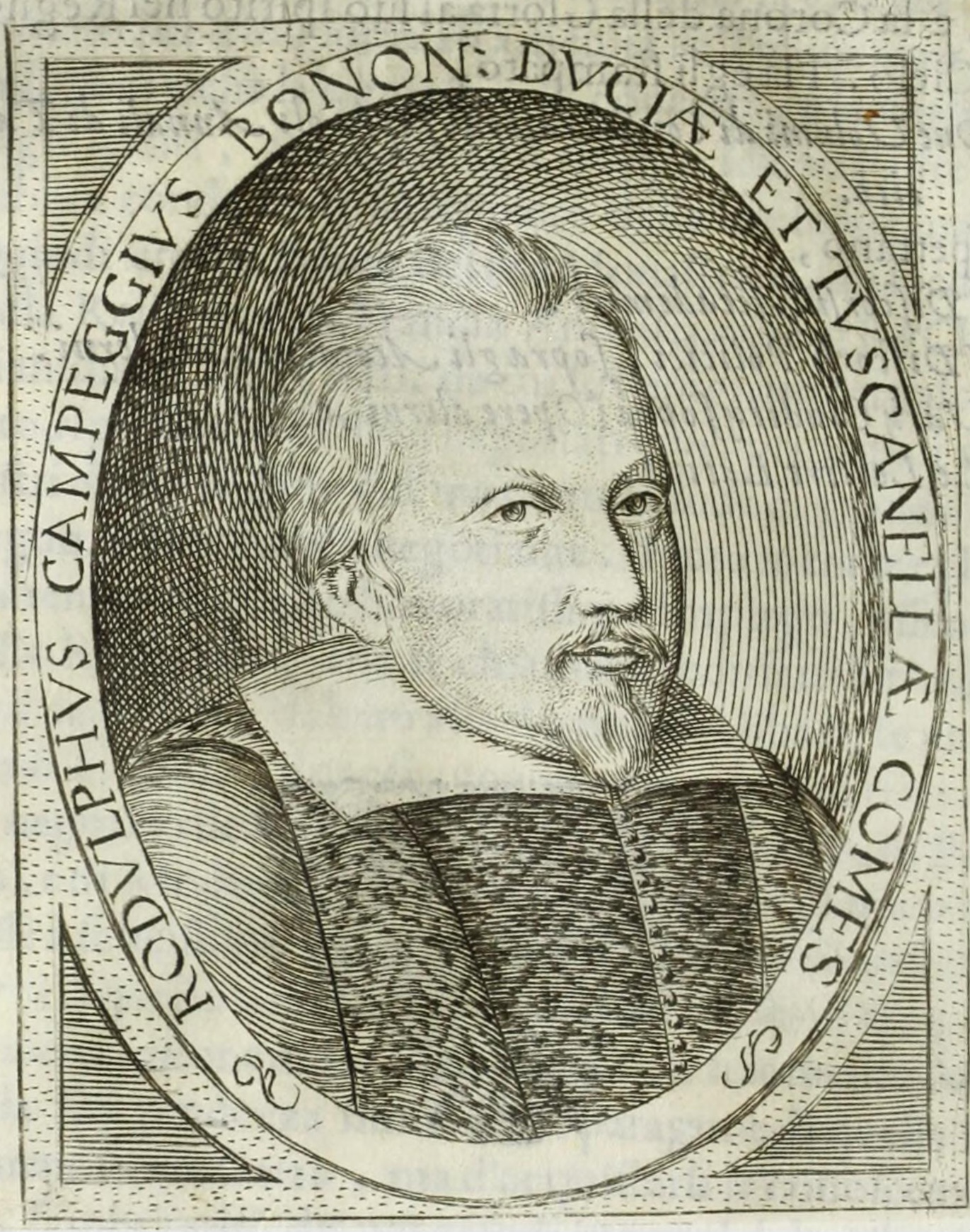
- Portrait of Ridolfo Campeggi from the book "Le glorie degli Incogniti", 1647
- Born: 1565; Bologna, Papal States
- Died: 28 June 1624 (aged 58–59); Bologna, Papal States
- Resting place: Chiesa della Santissima Annunziata (Bologna)
- Occupations: Poet; Intellectual
- Spouse: Pentesilea Cattanei
- Writing career
- Pen name: Rugginoso
- Language: Italian
- Period: 17th century; Baroque
- Genres: Poetry; drama
- Notable work: Le Lagrime di Maria Vergine
- Literary movement: Baroque; Neoclassicism

Count Ridolfo Campeggi (1565 – 28 June 1624) was an Italian nobleman, Marinist poet, librettist, and playwright.

== Biography ==
Ridolfo Campeggi was born in Bologna, the scion of a noble family. He was a member of the prestigious Accademia dei Gelati, assuming the pseudonym of Rugginoso (the "rusty" or "stained" one). He headed the Academy in 1598 and 1614. His pastoral play Il Filarmindo was performed in 1605, at the Casa Zoppio in Bologna where the accademia had its own private theatre. Filarmindo was a popular work in its day and brought Campeggi his first success.

Campeggi wrote the libretto of Girolamo Giacobbi's Andromeda, the first opera to be performed in Bologna (1610). He wrote also the interludes of L’Aurora disingannata, set to music by Giacobbi, and the musical drama Il Reno sacrificante (1617).

Besides musical dramas, Campeggi wrote plays and lyric and sacred poetry. His tragedy Tancredi (1614), based on the tale of Tancred and Ghismonda (Decameron IV, 1) had a notable success. Following the lead of Federico Asinari and Pomponio Torelli, Campeggi tried to elevate Italian tragedy to the plane of Seneca and ancient Greek theatre. A translation in Bolognese dialect of Michelangelo Buonarroti the Younger's La Tancia has been attributed to him. Also worthy of mention is the one hundred octaves poem L’Italia consolata [Italy comforted], composed by Campeggi in the occasion of the wedding between Victor Amadeus I, Duke of Savoy and Christine of France.

Campeggi was highly praised by Marino, who, in a letter to Claudio Achillini published in the preface of his poetry collection La Sampogna, called him “one of the freest quills that soar in our days in the Italian ether” (una delle più franche penne, che oggidì volino per lo cielo italiano). He was a member of the Accademia degli Incogniti of Venice and of the Accademia degli Umoristi of Rome. His correspondence with some of the most important Italian men of letters of the day has been only recently discovered in the Fondo Malvezzi-Campeggi. Campeggi's most important work is his sixteen-cantos poem Le Lagrime di Maria Vergine (1617), one of the most popular religious epics of the day. Subsequent editions of the poem appeared in 1618 (Cochi) and 1643.

Campeggi died in Bologna on 28 June 1624 and was buried in the church of the Annunziata.

== Works ==
- Filarmindo favola pastorale del Rugginoso Gelato il co. Ridolfo Campeggi, Bologna, presso gli heredi di Gio. Rossi, 1605.
- Rime del Conte Ridolfo Campeggi nell'Accademia dei Gelati il Rugginoso ..., Parma, appresso Simone Parlasca, 1608.
- L'aurora ingannata, fauoletta del co. Ridolfo Campeggi, Bologna, per gli heredi di Gio. Rossi, 1608.
- Quattro pianti delle lagrime di Maria Vergine del co. Ridolfo Campeggi, Bologna, per Simone Parlasca, 1609.
- Andromeda tragedia del co. Ridolfo Campeggi da recitarsi in musica in Bologna, Bologna, appresso Bartolomeo Cocchi, 1610.
- Il Tancredi tragedia di Ridolfo Campeggi nell'Academia de i Gelati il Rugginoso. Bologna: appresso Bartolomeo Cochi. 1614.
- Idilli del molto ill.re sig. conte Ridolfo Campeggi. L'amante schernito. La morte di Procri. La morte di Florigella ..., Venezia, presso Giovanni Battista Ciotti, 1614.
- Le lagrime di Maria Vergine poema heroico del sig. co. Ridolfo Campeggi nell'Academia dei Gelati il Rugginoso. Bologna: appresso Sebastiano Bonomi. 1617.
- Il Reno sacrificante, attione dramatica in musica del sig. co. Ridolfo Campeggi, Bologna, per Sebastiano Bonomi, 1617.
- La Italia consolata epitalamio per le reali nozze del sereniss. Vittorio Amadeo ..., Bologna, presso Bartolomeo Cochi, 1619.
- Delle poesie del signor conte Ridolfo Campeggi, Venetia, appresso Uberto Faber et compagni, 1620.
- La nave panegirico delle lodi della santità di N.S. papa Gregorio XV, Bologna, presso gli heredi di Bartolomeo Cochi, 1621.
- Racconto de gli heretici iconomiasti giustiziati in Bologna a' gloria di Dio della B. Vergine et per honore della patria, Bologna, ad instanza di Pelegrino Golfarini, 1622.
- La destruttione di Gierusalemme del sig. conte Ridolfo Campeggi, ..., Roma, per Lodovico Grignani, 1628.

== Bibliography ==
- «Ridolfo Campeggi conte». In : Memorie imprese, e ritratti de' signori Accademici Gelati di Bologna, In Bologna : per li Manolessi, 1672, pp. 370–375 (on-line).
- Crasso, Lorenzo (1666). Degli elogi degli uomini letterati. Venice: Combi e La Naù. pp. 127–130.
- Mutini, Claudio (1974). "CAMPEGGI, Ridolfo". Dizionario Biografico degli Italiani (in Italian). Vol. 17: Calvart–Canefri. Rome: Istituto dell'Enciclopedia Italiana. ISBN 978-88-12-00032-6.
- Fogagnolo, Barbara (1996). "Quattro lettere inedite di Giovan Battista Marino a Ridolfo Campeggi". Aevum. 70 (3): 637–656. JSTOR 20860667.
- Chiarelli, Francesca (2002). "Campeggi, Ridolfo". The Oxford Companion to Italian Literature. Oxford University Press.
