= Carlo Emmanuele Vizzani =

Italian classical scholar, translator, and canonist (1617–1661)

Doctor Carlo Emmanuele Vizzani
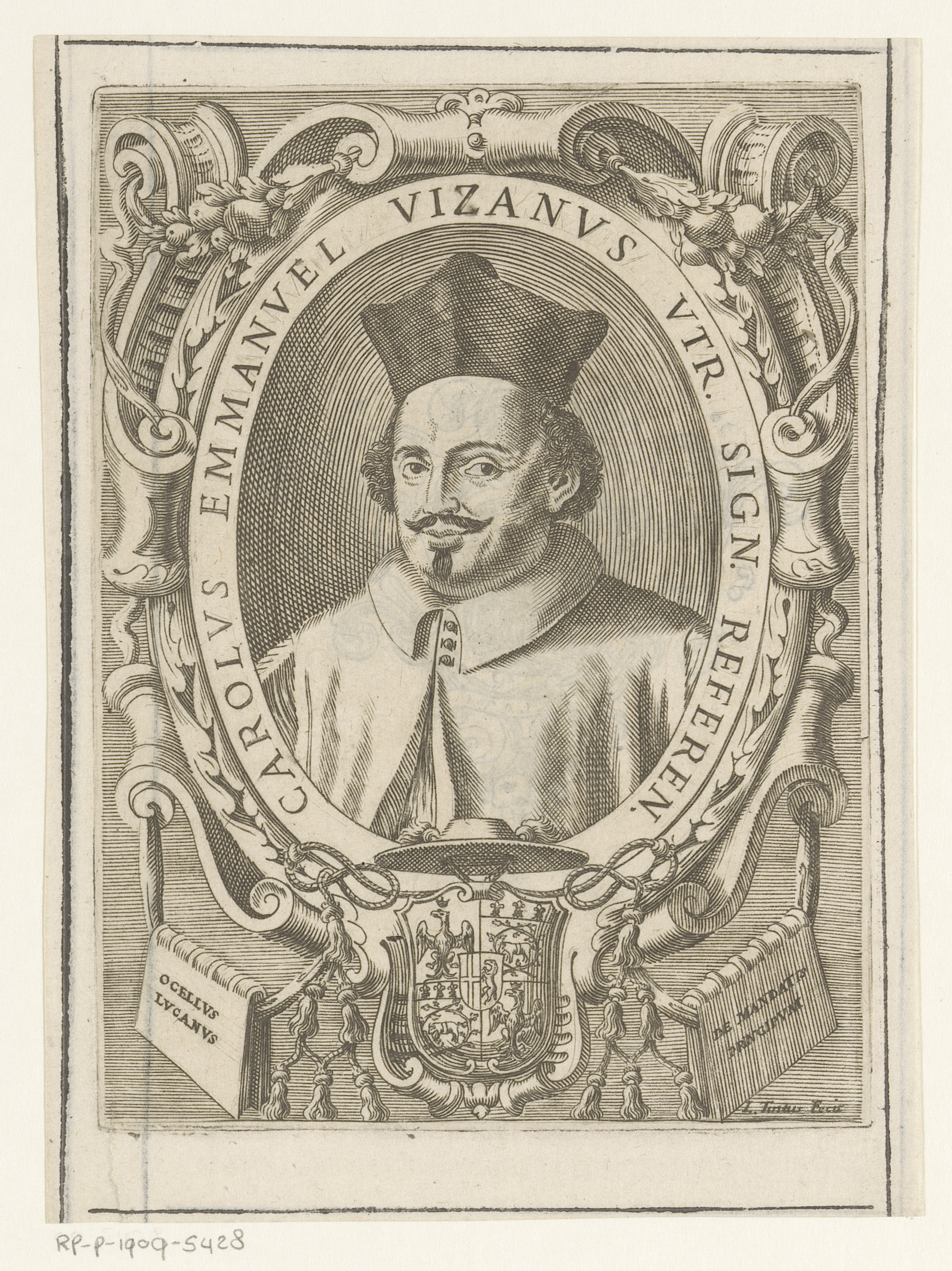
- Carlo Emmanuele Vizzani
- Born: 1617; Bologna, Papal States
- Died: 29 October 1661 (aged 43–44); Rome, Papal States
- Resting place: Santa Maria sopra Minerva
- Occupations: Classical scholar, university teacher, canon lawyer
- Parent(s): Giasone Vizzani and Plautilla Vizzani (née Ghiselli)

Academic background
- Education: University of Bologna; Sapienza University of Rome
- Influences: Pythagoreans; Ocellus Lucanus

Academic work
- Discipline: Ancient Greek Scholar, jurist
- Institutions: University of Padua; Sapienza University of Rome
- Notable students: Annibale Ranuzzi

Carlo Emmanuele Vizzani (1617 – 29 October 1661) was an Italian classical scholar, translator, and canonist.

== Biography ==
Carlo Emmanuele Vizzani was born in Bologna in 1617. He obtained his doctorate in philosophy and jurisprudence from the University of Bologna in 1634. He was a professor of logic at the University of Padua, but his knowledge in the classics drew him to Rome, where he occupied a variety of positions: consistorial lawyer, secretary of the Roman Inquisition, Referendary of the Apostolic Signatura, and canon of St. Peter. In 1646, he published a critical edition of Ocellus Lucanus' De universi natura with his own Latin translation. This important work was reissued by Joan Blaeu in 1661. In 1658, Vizzani became rector of the Sapienza University of Rome. He died in 1661 and was buried in the Dominican church of Santa Maria Sopra Minerva. His funeral monument was designed and sculpted by Domenico Guidi. Vizzani was a member of the Accademia degli Incogniti of Venice and the Accademia dei Gelati of Bologna.

== Works ==
- Epistola græco-latina super raptum Helenæ a Guidone Rheno depictum. Bononiae, typ. Ferronii, 1633.
- Pseudo-Ocellus Lucanus (1646). Carlo Emmanuele Vizzani (ed.). Περὶ τῆς τοῦ παντὸς φύσεως/De Universi natura (in Latin and Greek). Bologna: ex typographia Ferroniana.
- De mandatis principum, seu de officio eorum, qui in provincias cum imperio mittuntur. Amsterdam: Joan Blaeu. 1656.

== Bibliography ==
- «Carlo Emanuel Vizzani Bolognese». In : Le glorie de gli Incogniti: o vero, Gli huomini illustri dell'Accademia de' signori Incogniti di Venetia, In Venetia : appresso Francesco Valuasense stampator dell'Accademia, 1647, pp. 88–91 (on-line).
- «Carlo Emanuelle Vizzani». In : Memorie imprese, e ritratti de' signori Accademici Gelati di Bologna, In Bologna : per li Manolessi, 1672, pp. 98–102 (on-line).
