= Luigi Crespi =

Italian painter (1708–1779)

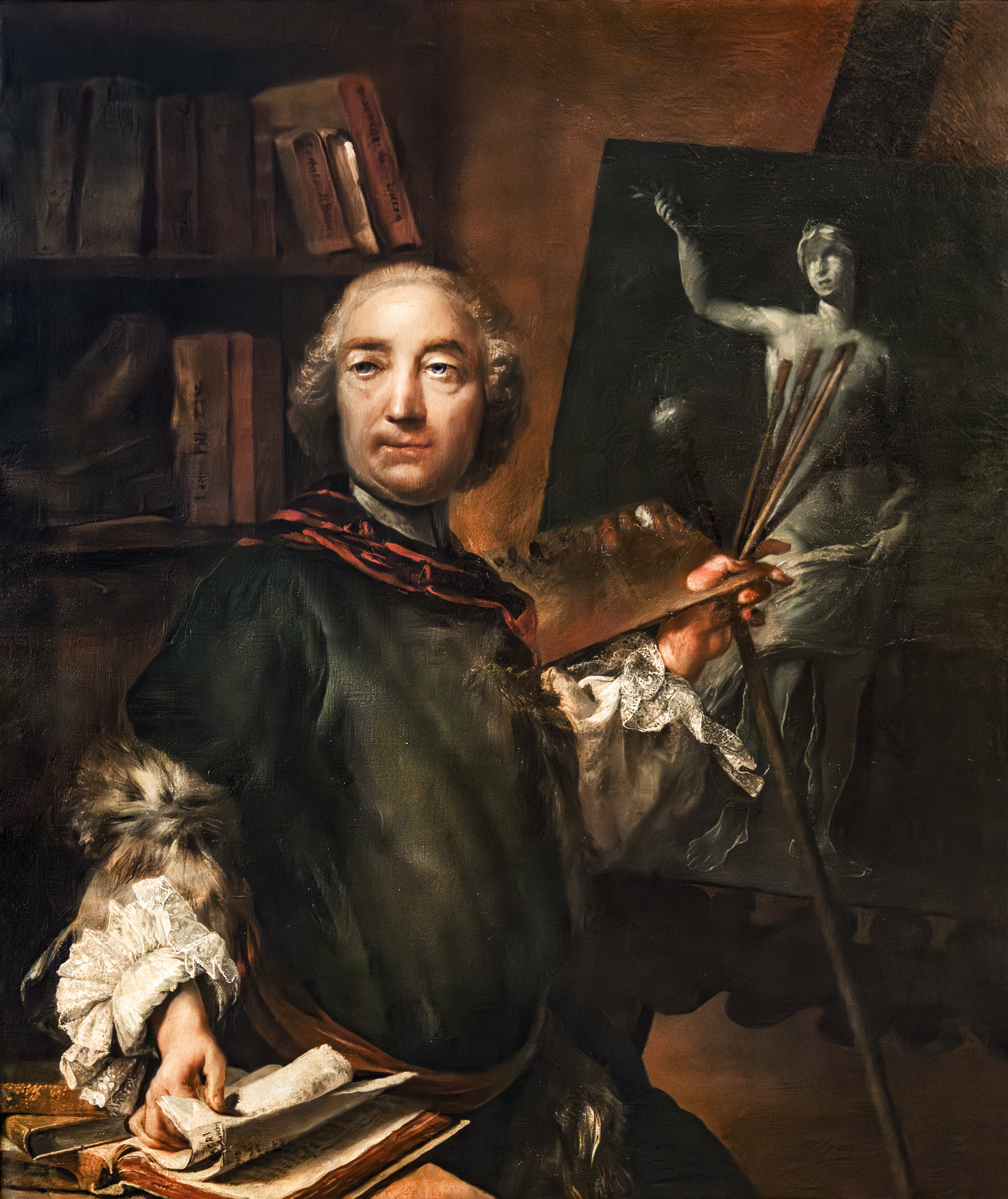
- Paitning of Crespi, 1775 in Gallerie dell'Accademia
- Born: 23 January 1708; Bologna, Papal States
- Died: 2 July 1779 (aged 71); Bologna, Papal States
- Occupations: Painter; art merchant; historian
- Style: Neoclassicism
- Father: Giuseppe Crespi

Luigi Crespi (23 January 1708 – 2 July 1779) was an Italian painter, and art merchant and historian. He was the son of the prominent Bolognese painter, Giuseppe Crespi.

== Early life ==
Crespi was born on 23 January 1708 in Bologna.

== Career ==
He trained with his father and completed a few altarpieces, including for the churches of San Sigismondo in Bologna, San Bartolomeo della Buona Morte in Finale Emilia, the parish church of Bastiglia in the Province of Modena, and a "Madonna del Rosario" for the Sanctuary of Valdibrana in Pistoia.

In 1748, he was nominated canon of the Collegiata di Santa Maria Maggiore in Bologna. Two years later he became an assistant to Cardinal Lambertini, later Pope Benedict XIV. he traveled to Dresden in 1751–1753. upon returning to Bologna, he worked in the re-issuing and editing of the Carlo Cesare Malvasia's Biographies of Bolognese artists, published in 1753, and titled Felsina pittrice.

In the 1760s, he began a career as portraitist in a Neoclassical style. He accumulated a number of honors and appointments, including an appointment as associate professor of the Academy of Fine Arts of Florence in 1770; honorary academic of the Academy of Parma (1774) and of Venice (1776).

== Death ==
He died on 2 July 1779 in Bologna.

== Bibliography ==
- Alessandro Cont, "Ove pennello industre l'imagin tua ritrasse": i gusti e gli studi del Giovin Signore nell'Italia del Settecento, "Rivista storica italiana", 128, 1 (aprile 2016), pp. 106–148
