= Guido Casoni =

Italian Baroque poet, jurist, and writer (1561–1642)

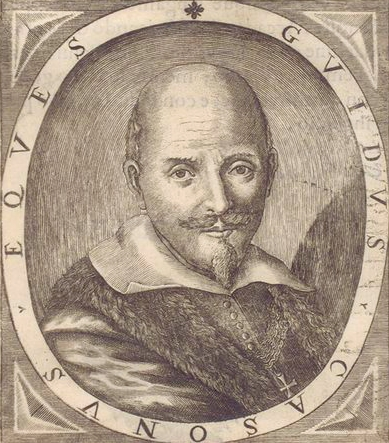
- Portrait of Guido Casoni. From the book "Le glorie degli Incogniti", 1647
- Born: 1561; Serravalle, Republic of Venice
- Died: 30 May 1642 (aged 80–81); Serravalle, Republic of Venice
- Resting place: Church of S. Giustina, Vittorio Veneto
- Occupations: Poet; Intellectual; Jurist
- Spouse: Benedetta Minucci (m. 1582)
- Children: 16
- Writing career
- Language: Latin; Italian
- Period: 17th century; Baroque
- Genres: Poetry; treatise
- Notable works: De la magia d'amore Ode; Emblemi politici
- Literary movement: Late Renaissance; Baroque

Guido Casoni (1561 — 30 May 1642) was an Italian Baroque poet, jurist, and writer. He was a forerunner of Marinism, anticipating the tastes and values of the Baroque years before Seicentismo became the leading fashion in Italian literature.

== Biography ==
Guido Casoni was born in Serravalle (Treviso) in 1561. He worked as a notary in Serravalle and practised as a lawyer first in Treviso and then in Venice. In 1582 he married in Serravalle Benedetta Minucci, sister of Minuccio Minucci, the future bishop of Zara. One of the founding members of the Accademia degli Incogniti, Casoni was a close friend of Giovanni Francesco Loredan and Tommaso Garzoni. Garzoni's Piazza Universale influenced Casoni's De la magia d'amore (1591).

Casoni is generally held to be one of the earliest exponents of Italian conceptismo. According to Loredan's Vita del Cavalier Marino, Casoni was the single individual Marino longed to meet once he set foot in the Serenissima in 1602. Casoni soon became close to Marino with whom he maintained a lifelong friendship. Casoni became famous above all for his Ode (1602) and for the poetry collection Teatro poetico (1615).

After declining an invitation to reside at the court of the Duke of Savoia, Casoni was named dogal ambassador to Serravalle, and elected Knight of the Order of Saint Mark by Doge Antonio Priuli on 7 March 1619, in recognition of his consistent contribution to the Republic through his literary publications. This last honour probably occasioned the two editions of Opere del signor caualier Guido Casoni (1623 and 1626), as well as his new richly illustrated edition of Tasso's Jerusalem Delivered, for which Casoni composed a new biography of the author, Vita di Torquato Tasso (1625).

Finally in 1632, in addition to the Incogniti Ode, Casoni published his last poetic work, a twenty-two canto illustrated poem on the ideal state (praised by Angelo Grillo as «vera filosofia di stato»), Gli emblemi politici. Casoni died in Serravalle in 1642. He was buried in the church of Santa Giustina of Ceneda (now Vittorio Veneto).

== Works ==
- L'opere del sig. caualier Guido Casoni. Venice: presso Tomaso Baglioni. 1626.
- Vita della gloriosa vergine e martire Augusta Serravallese composta in ottava rima. Venice: Fabio e Agostino Zoppini. 1582.
- Della Magia d'Amore. Venice: Fabio e Agostino Zoppini. 1591.
- La Passione di Christo, 1626.
- Vita di Torquato Tasso (1625).
- Emblemi Politici. Venice: Paolo Baglioni. 1632.
- "La miseria humana; La umana infelicità". Discorsi Academici De' Signori Incogniti. Venise: Sarzina: 3–20. 1635.
- Meditazioni divote applicate ai misteri divini e ai Santi, de' quali si celebra la festa di giorno in giorno per tutto l'anno, del cavalier Guido Casoni. Venice: Paolo Baglioni. 1636.

== Bibliography ==
- Media related to Guido Casoni at Wikimedia Commons
- Slawinski, M. (2002). "Casoni, Guido". The Oxford Companion to Italian Literature. Oxford University Press. ISBN 978-0-19-818332-7.
- Mutini, Claudio (2004). "CASONI, Guido". Dizionario Biografico degli Italiani (in Italian). Vol. 63: Labroca–Laterza. Rome: Istituto dell'Enciclopedia Italiana. ISBN 978-88-12-00032-6.
- «Guido Casoni Serravallese». In : Le glorie de gli Incogniti: o vero, Gli huomini illustri dell'Accademia de' signori Incogniti di Venetia, In Venetia : appresso Francesco Valuasense stampator dell'Accademia, 1647, pp. 293–295 (on-line).
- Corradini, Marco (1987). "La ricerca metaforica di Guido Casoni". Aevum. 61 (3): 503–516. JSTOR 20858243.
- Marco, Elena (1987). "Un marinista veneto e la musica nel primo Seicento: Guido Casoni, le «veglie d'ingegno» e il trattato Della magia d'Amore". Il Flauto Dolce (16): 8–13. JSTOR 41700372.
- Harrán, Don (2001). "Guido Casoni on Love as Music, a Theme "For All Ages and Studies"". Renaissance Quarterly. 54 (3). Cambridge University Press: 883–913. doi:10.2307/1261927. JSTOR 1261927.
- Cannizzaro, Nina, “Studies on Guido Casoni (1561–1642) and Venetian Academies”, PhD thesis (Cambridge, MA: Harvard University, 2001).
- Cannizzaro, Nina (2003). "Surpassing the Maestro: Loredano, Colluraffi, Casoni and the Origins of the Accademia degli Incogniti". Annali di Storia Moderna e Contemporanea. IX: 369–397.
