= Girolamo Giacobbi =

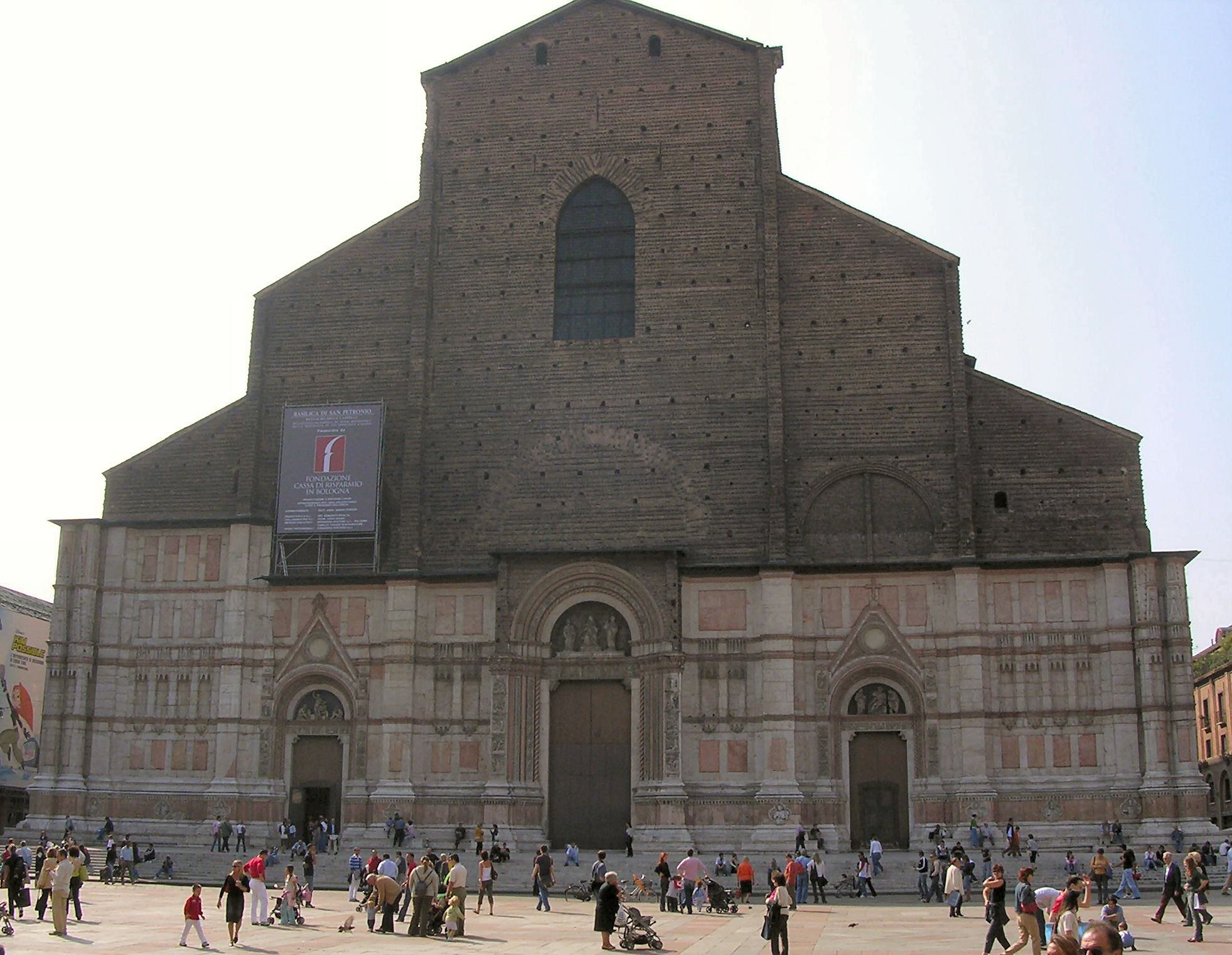
- Basilica of San Petronio, where he was a choir boy

Background information
- Born: 1567; Bologna
- Origin: Italian
- Died: 1628; Bologna
- Occupation(s): choirmaster, conductor, and composer
- Years active: 1590-1628

Girolamo Giacobbi (baptized on 10 August 1567 – 23 December 1628) was an Italian choirmaster, conductor, and composer.

== Life ==
Giocobbi was born in Bologna in 1567. He had been a choir boy at the Basilica of San Petronio in Bologna and became the Director of Music there from 1604 to 1628. He founded the "Accademia dei Filomusi" dedicated to the cultivation of music in Bologna.

He wrote a significant number of sacred works and was especially active in the field of opera. Giacobbi was a composer of high esteem during his time.

== Operas ==
- L'Aurora ingannata - libretto by Ridolfo Campeggi, performed in Bologna in 1605.
- L'Andromeda - a tragic opera in five acts with a libretto by Campeggi, performed in Bologna in the carnival of 1610.
- Proserpina rapita - libretto by Campeggi performed in Bologna in 1613.
- Amor prigioniero - libretto by Silvestro Branchi, performed in Bologna in 1615.
- Il Reno sacrificante - libretto by Campeggi, performed in Bologna in 1617.
- Ruggiero liberato - performed in Bologna in 1620.
- La selva dei mirti - libretto by Bernardino Marescotti, performed in Bologna in 1623.
- La montagna fulminata - libretto by Marescotti, performed in Bologna in 1628 and probably his last work.
