= Giambattista Roberti =

Venetian Jesuit, poet, and writer (1719–1786)

Reverend Giambattista Roberti SJ
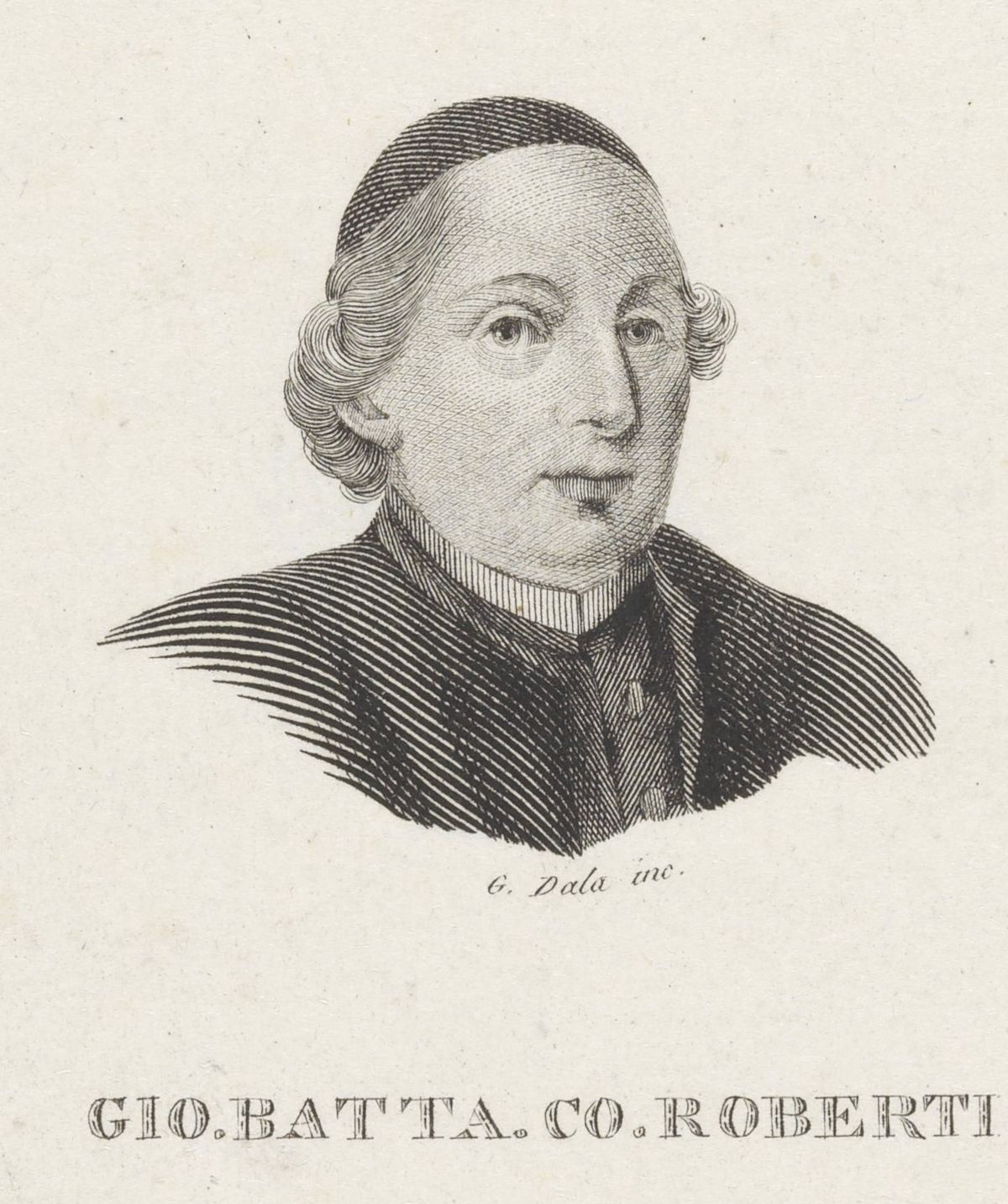
- Giambattista Roberti
- Born: 4 March 1719; Bassano del Grappa, Republic of Venice
- Died: 29 July 1786 (aged 67); Bassano del Grappa, Republic of Venice
- Occupations: Poet; Intellectual; Writer
- Parent(s): Roberto Roberti and Lucrezia Francesca Roberti (née Fracanzani)
- Writing career
- Language: Venetian
- Notable works: Del leggere i libri di metafisica e di divertimento Lettera di un ufficiale portoghese ad un mercante inglese sopra il trattamento de’ negri
- Literary movement: Counter-Enlightenment

Giambattista Roberti SJ (4 March 1719 – 29 July 1786) was a Venetian Jesuit, poet and writer.

== Biography ==
Born in Bassano del Grappa, on 20 May 1736, Roberti entered the Society of Jesus and in 1743 he was ordained a priest. He taught in the Jesuit colleges of Piacenza, Brescia, Parma and Bologna.

In Brescia, he befriended Saverio Bettinelli and wrote his first works. He displayed a moderately progressive outlook in his didactic poems Le fragole (1752) and La commedia (1756), which praises Carlo Goldoni's theatrical reforms. A close friend of Giampietro Zanotti, Roberti was a member of the Accademia dei Gelati of Bologna. In his essay Del leggere i libri di metafisica e di divertimento (1769), Roberti refuted the anonymous pamphlet De la prédication, attributed to Voltaire, and denounced the irreligiosity and licentiousness of contemporary literature. The work was translated into German and published in Augsburg in 1788.

After the suppression of the Society of Jesus (1773), Robert left Bologna and moved to his native in Bassano, where he met the famous astronomer Roger Joseph Boscovich. In 1782, he published the Favole esopiane, a sharp criticism 18th century moral decadence. In his pamphlet Lettera di un ufficiale portoghese ad un mercante inglese sopra il trattamento de’ negri (1786) Roberti condemned slavery and advocated abolition of the international slave trade. He died in Bassano on 29 July 1786.

== Works ==
- Raccolta di varie operette, VIII, Bologna, 1767–1795;
- Rime di Giacomo Vittorelli con una lettera dell’abate Giambatista Conte Roberti, Bassano, 1784;
- Opere [...] coll’aggiunta degli Opuscoli postumi dello stesso Autore, e colle notizie intorno alla sua Vita, XIV, Bassano, 1789;
- Saggio di lettere famigliari dell’abate Giambatista Conte Roberti. Opera Postuma, Bassano, 1797;
- Opere [...] seconda edizione veneta coll’aggiunta degli Opuscoli postumi dello stesso Autore, colle notizie intorno alla sua Vita, XV, Bassano, 1797;
- Opere, nuova edizione, XIX, Venice, 1830–1831;
- S. Baragetti, ed. (2014). Lettera sopra l'uso della fisica nella poesia (1765). Milan: LED Edizioni Universitarie. ISBN 978-88-7916-652-2.

== Bibliography ==
- Media related to Giambattista Roberti at Wikimedia Commons
- Fido, Franco (2002). "Roberti, Giovanni Battista". The Oxford Companion to Italian Literature. Oxford University Press. ISBN 978-0-19-818332-7.
- Galtarossa, Massimo (2016). "Roberti, Giambattista". Dizionario Biografico degli Italiani (in Italian). Vol. 87: Renzi–Robortello. Rome: Istituto dell'Enciclopedia Italiana. ISBN 978-88-12-00032-6.
- Tuccillo, Alessandro (2020). Umanità contesa. L'apologetica di Giambatista Roberti contro il «filosofismo». Rome: Edizioni di Storia e Letteratura. ISBN 9788893594844.
