= Carlo Cesare Malvasia =

Italian scholar and art historian (1616–1693)

Doctor Carlo Cesare Malvasia
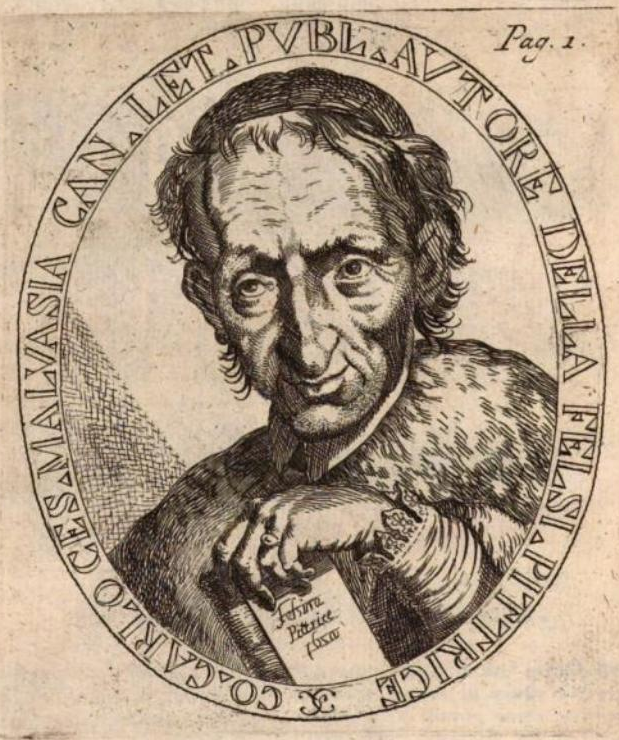
- Portrait by Luigi Crespi
- Born: 18 December 1616; Bologna, Papal States
- Died: 9 March 1693 (aged 76); Bologna, Papal States
- Other name: Ascoso
- Occupations: Catholic priest; historian; university teacher; epigraphist
- Known for: Felsina pittrice
- Parents: Anton-Galeazzo Malvasia; Caterina Lucchini
- Family: Malvasia family

Academic background
- Education: University of Bologna
- Doctoral advisor: Claudio Achillini
- Influences: Vasari; Boschini; Papebroch; Cureau de La Chambre

Academic work
- Discipline: History; archaeology
- Sub-discipline: Art history; epigraphy
- Influenced: De Piles; Zanotti; Dezallier d'Argenville; Lanzi

Carlo Cesare Malvasia (18 December 1616 – 9 March 1693) was an Italian scholar and art historian from Bologna, best known for his biographies of Baroque artists titled Felsina pittrice, published in 1678. Together with his contemporary Giovanni Pietro Bellori, Malvasia is considered "among the best informed and most intelligent historians and critics of art who ever lived."

== Early life ==
Carlo Cesare Malvasia was born on 18 December 1616 to Anton-Galeazzo Malvasia, a member of the lesser nobility who held the title of count (which his son was to inherit), and a certain Caterina, described only as "a woman of low degree but his legitimate wife." The young man studied poetry under Cesare Rinaldi, a renowned baroque poet, and he also studied music. He wrote poetry while still a boy and learned to play several musical instruments. He received cursory training in painting under Giacinto Campana and Giacomo Cavedone. Later, under the guidance of a noted jurist, Claudio Achillini (1575–1640), he studied law and took his degree at the University of Bologna in December 1638.

== Career ==
Shortly after graduating he moved to Rome where he remained active in both law and literature. He belonged to two literary societies, the Accademia degli Umoristi and the Accademia dei Fantastici. In this last he served as principe or president. He became friends with Cardinal Bernardino Spada and the sculptor Alessandro Algardi.

While he was still in Rome a small-scale war broke out between the Farnese, one of Italy's most powerful families, and the Barberini, whose family was headed by Urban VIII, the reigning pope. Both sides contested for Castro, the largest dukedom inside the boundaries of the Papal States. Malvasia at once enlisted on the side of the pope. He fought with valor in a brigade commanded by his cousin, the Marchese Cornelio Malvasia, leader of the Papal Army cavalry.

After the end of the War of Castro, Malvasia became gravely ill. Probably about this time, in the early 1640s, he returned to Bologna, where he was to remain for the rest of his life. On his recovery from his unnamed illness he studied for and entered the priesthood. He obtained a theology degree in 1653, and in 1662 was appointed a canon of the Cathedral of Bologna, a position of considerable prestige. He also continued his interest in literary matters and was an active member of the Accademia dei Gelati, the most important Bolognese literary society. Nevertheless, his principal career was to be in the law. In 1647, when he was only thirty-one years old, he was made professor of law at the University of Bologna, a post he held for forty years. The many tracts he published on legal matters spread his fame and brought him offers to join the faculties of other universities, those of Padua and Pavia included, but he preferred not to leave his native city.

To the already considerable list of his skills should be added an ability to paint and draw. These arts he studied under Giacomo Cavedone (1577–1660), a pupil of the Carracci, and while he practiced them for his diversion only, we know that he painted a number of frescoes, apparently landscape scenes and "perspectives," both in his own villa and in those of friends.

He reportedly knew many artists. Guido Reni, whom he reportedly admired enormously, was an especially close friend.

For younger artists, he was known as a benefactor. At his own expense, he set up an art academy to teach aspiring painters to draw from nude. Luigi Crespi tells us of his help for struggling young artists, some of whom would otherwise have had to leave the profession. He also recognized the talent of Elisabetta Sirani (1638–1665) and, overcoming the resistance of her father, saw to it that she received training as a painter. As a result, despite the fact that death ended her career when she was only twenty-seven years old, she enjoys a secure place in the history of Bolognese art.

Malvasia was also a collector and acted as an agent for Louis XIV in acquisition of Bolognese artworks for the royal collections. He dedicated the Felsina pittrice to Louis XIV. Sun King did not fail to show his gratitude to Carlo Cesare by sending him the famous “Gioiello della Vita”, a small but very precious jewel. Written in the tradition of Giorgio Vasari's Vite (1550) but without Vasari's belief in the supremacy of Florentine and Tuscan painting, Malvasia's Felsina promotes a new and passionate appreciation of Bolognese art, championing the originality and diversity of Bolognese painters on the basis of painstakingly collected data and documents. Malvasia died in Bologna on 9 March in 1693.

== Works ==
The vast body of his writings includes many legal studies and much poetry. In his youth, Malvasia enjoyed considerable success as a Marinist poet active both in Bologna and in Rome. One of the best examples of the poetry, Il fiore coronato, published in 1647, is an ode in honour of Cardinal Marzio Ginetti. Then there is the curious Aelia Laelia Crispis non nata resurgens, which was published in Bologna in 1683. It deals with an enigmatic ancient Roman inscription that Malvasia studied and claimed to have deciphered, although his explanation, in the words of one writer, "was not among the most felicitous of the attempts" made by various scholars. The opposite can be said of Le pitture di Bologna, an essential guide book to Bologna and its treasures, first published in 1686. Enthusiastically received, it was reprinted four times before 1704. A new edition revised and enlarged by Giampietro Zanotti appeared in 1706, and was reprinted in 1732, 1755 and 1766. The latest edition, edited by Carlo Bianconi, Marcello Oretti and Francesco Maria Longhi, was published in Bologna in 1776. Other significant works by Malvasia are Il Claustro di S Michele in Bosco di Bologna (1694), and the Lettera a Monsignor Albergati, a perceptive description of the Supper in the House of the Pharisee (1652; Bologna, Certosa) by Giovanni Andrea Sirani.

== Felsina pittrice, vite de’ pittori bolognesi ==
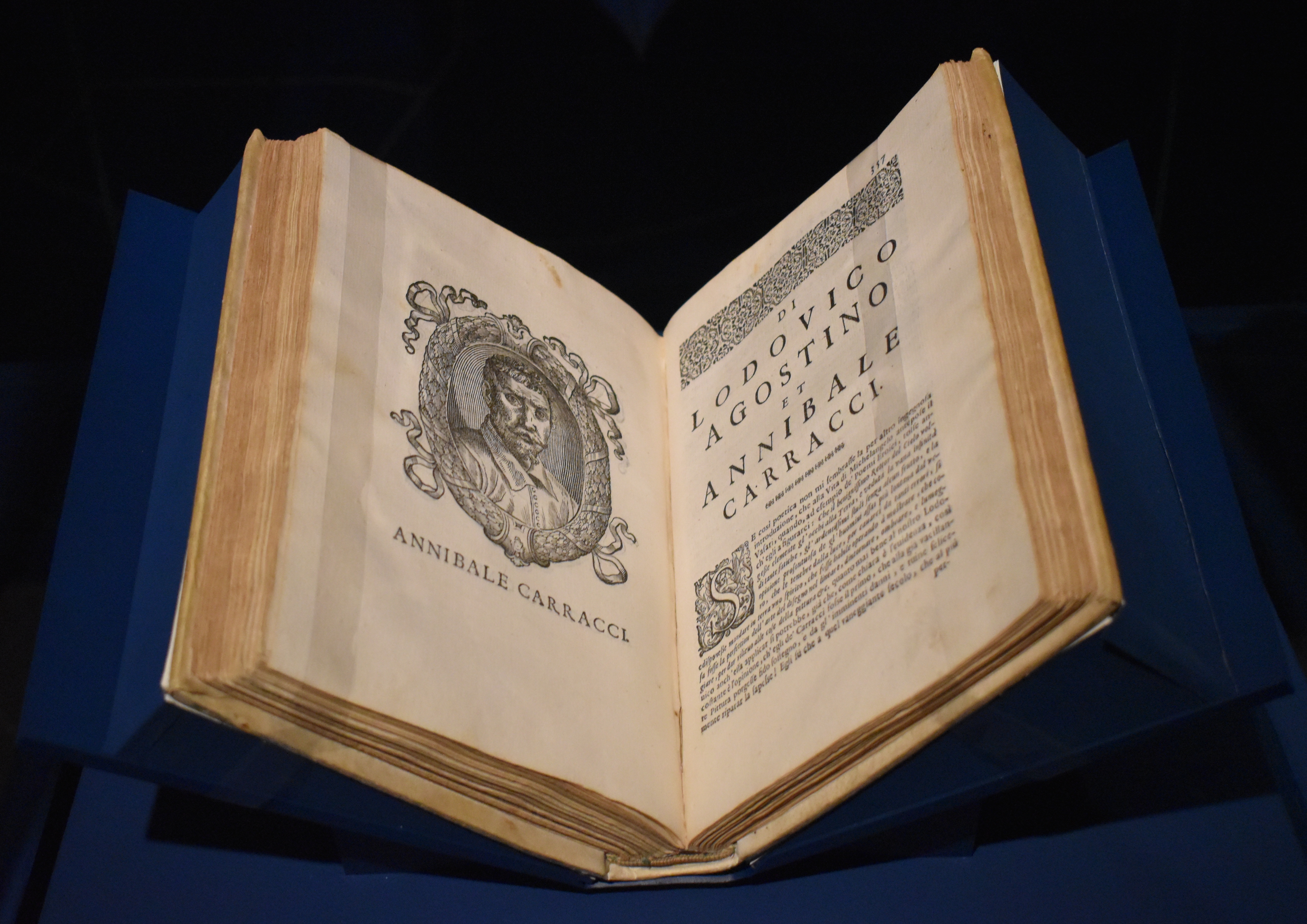
Malvasia's biography of the Carracci in the Felsina pittrice of 1678. This particular copy belonged to Antonio Canova

Malvasia is the Bolognese equivalent of Giorgio Vasari, and saw his native city surpassing Florence in the artistic supremacy of his time. Felsina pittrice, vite de’ pittori bolognesi is a primary source of information about the Bolognese school of painters of the 14th – 17th centuries, and for some of the artists included, the only source of information. The text is divided into four historical sections, with the first on the trecento painters, the second focusing on Francesco Francia, the third devoted to the Carracci, and the fourth (and most valued today) providing detailed, firsthand accounts of the lives and careers of the artists who rose to pre-eminence during the 17th century in the wake of the Carracci reform, including Guido Reni, Guercino, Domenichino, Lanfranco, Lavinia Fontana and Elisabetta Sirani.

In the years since its first publication, the Felsina pittrice has been used continually and cited endlessly by writers interested in Bolognese art. The book was reissued in an abundantly annotated two-volume edition that was edited by Giampietro Zanotti and published in Bologna in 1841. Luigi Crespi, the son of the leading painter of the late Baroque in Bologna, Giuseppe Maria Crespi, continued Malvasia's massive undertaking with the addition of a third volume, Vite de' pittori bolognesi non descritte nella Felsina pittrice, which was printed in Rome in 1769. Malvasia's book enjoyed considerable success outside of Italy too. On 4 October 1710, the painter Charles de La Fosse began a public reading of his translation of Malvasia's Lives of the Carracci at the Royal Academy of Painting and Sculpture of Paris. A small group of Malvasia's biographies that remained in manuscript after the Felsina pittrice was printed were published in 1961, with an important and substantial introduction by Adriana Arfelli dealing with Malvasia and his work. A new edition of the Felsina pittrice, with an abridgement of the original text and an introduction by Marcella Brascaglia, was brought out in Bologna by Alfa in 1971. A part of the vast accumulation of working notes that Malvasia used for his Felsina pittrice still survives and can be found, bound in two large manuscript volumes, in the Archiginnasio Municipal Library.

Felsina pittrice has been criticized for its inaccuracies and unfavorably compared to Le vite de' pittori, scultori et architetti moderni (1672) by Malvasia's contemporary, Giovanni Pietro Bellori, on the grounds of that Malvasia's text is a mere compilation of facts embellished with poetic language, lacking in critical assessments and governed by no theoretical framework other than a provincial attachment to his native city. Recent scholarship has taken Malvasia more seriously as an art historian and the Center for Advanced Study in the Visual Arts is preparing the first scholarly, critical edition since 1841, accompanied by the first English translation, of the complete text of the Felsina pittrice (three of the planned sixteen volumes of which have been published by 2017).

Malvasia also published Le pitture di Bologna (1686), a companion gallery guide of works by the artists discussed in the Felsina pittrice, and Marmora Felsinea, an extended study of the ancient epigraphic material to be found in the environs of Bologna.
