= Melchiorre Zoppio =

Italian doctor and scholar

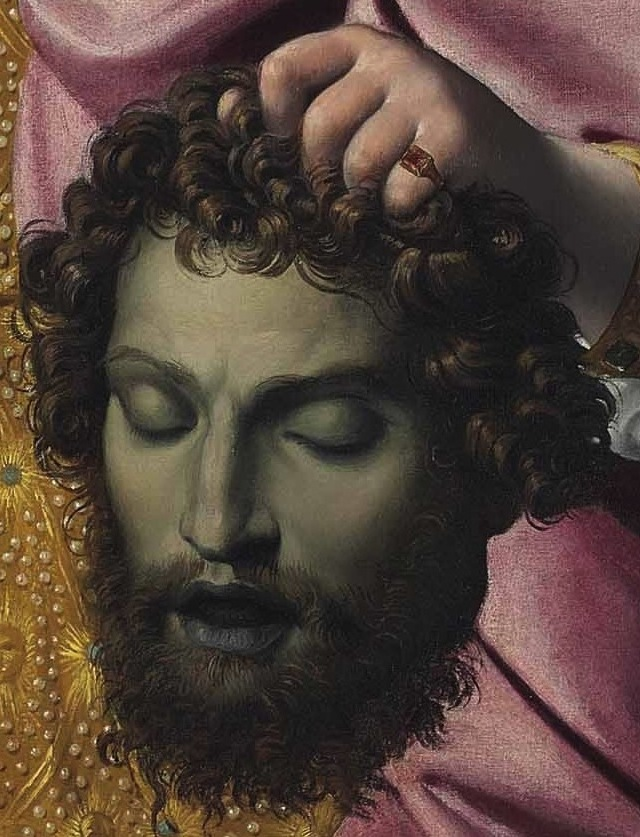
- Born: 1544; Bologna, Papal States
- Died: 1634 (aged 89–90); Bologna, Papal States
- Resting place: Santa Maria dei Servi, Bologna
- Occupations: University teacher; Doctor; Scholar
- Spouse: Olimpia Luna (m. 1591; died 1592)
- Parent(s): Girolamo Zoppio and Dorotea Zoppio (née Ercolani)

Academic background
- Education: University of Bologna
- Doctoral advisor: Ulisse Aldrovandi

Academic work
- Era: Late Renaissance
- Discipline: Philosophy, Medicine
- Institutions: University of Macerata; University of Bologna

Melchiorre or Melchior Zoppio (c. 1544–1634) was an Italian doctor and scholar.

== Life ==
Born in Bologna, a son of Girolamo Zoppio, Melchiorre Zoppio followed his father's dual career in medicine and education. He taught philosophy in Macerata then Bologna, where in 1588 he was one of the founders of the Accademia dei Gelati. He was one of that society's keenest members, adopting the name Caliginoso within it and leaving it a room for its meetings in his will. Over the fifty years he served as a professor in Bologna Melchiorre acquired such a reputation that his colleagues honoured him with a public inscription during his lifetime. His funeral involved an elaborate procession to the Basilica di Santa Maria dei Servi, where he was buried, and a eulogy by his colleague André Torelli.

== Works ==
Among many treatises on scholastic philosophy and some pamphlets, whose titles can be found in the Scrittori bolognesi by Orlandi, Melchior also wrote two comedies and four tragedies. The comedies were Diogene accusato (Venice, 1598, in-12), written in verses of five, seven and nine syllables, and Il Giuliano, whilst the tragedies were Admeto, Medea, Creusa and Meandro (all Bologna, 1629, in-12). He also left behind many works in manuscript form, including six large folio volumes on philosophical matters. Ghilini called Melchior a microcosm of sciences and letters and gave him and his father pieces in his Teatro d'uomini letterati.
