= Conceptismo =

Spanish literary movement

Conceptismo (literally, conceptism) is a literary movement of the Baroque period in the Spanish literature. It began in the late 16th century and lasted through the 17th century, also the period of the Spanish Golden Age.

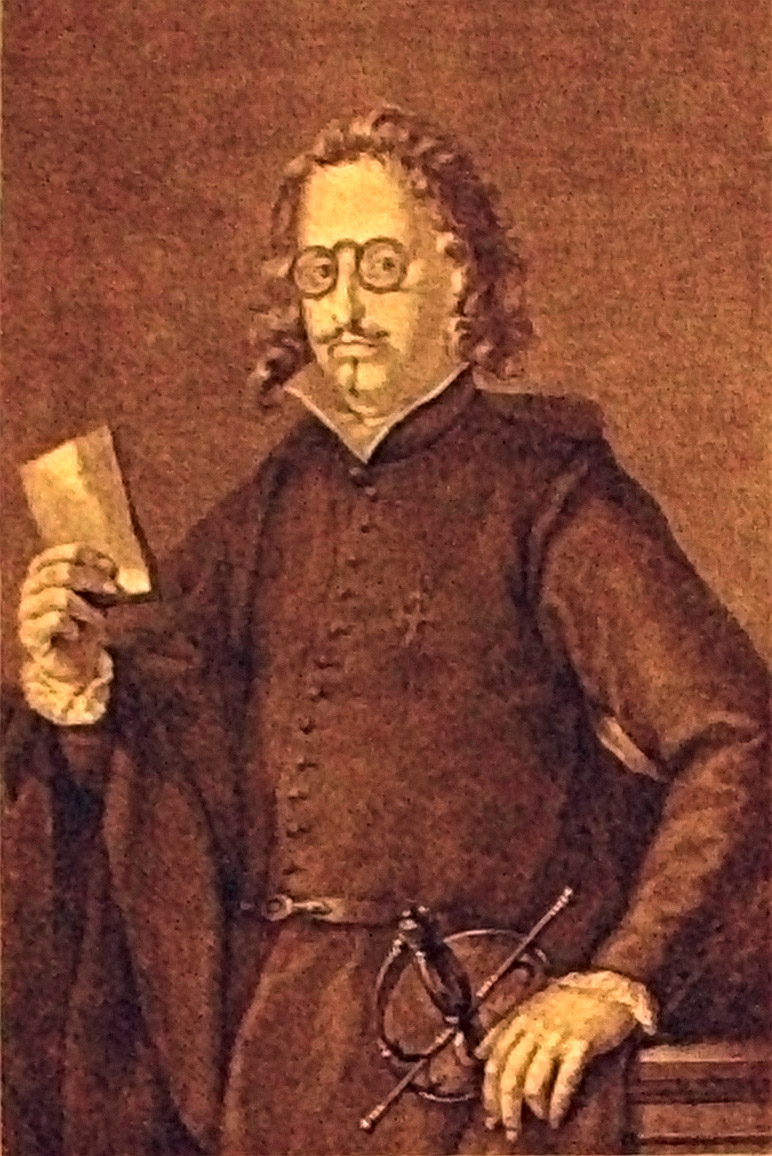
Francisco de Quevedo y Villegas, the most significant representative of Baroque conceptismo

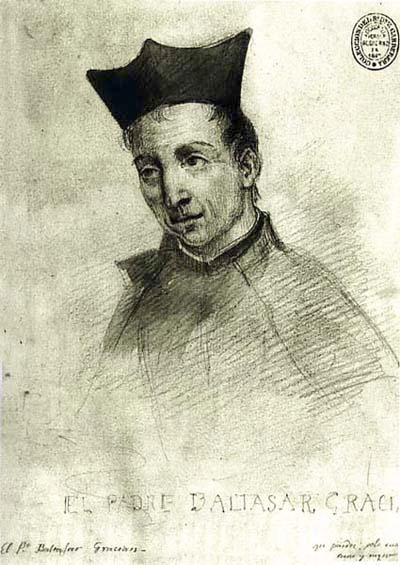
Baltasar Gracián

Conceptismo is characterized by a rapid rhythm, directness, simple vocabulary, witty metaphors, and wordplay. In this style, multiple meanings are conveyed in a very concise manner, and conceptual intricacies are emphasised over elaborate vocabulary.

== Definition ==
A major theorist of the movement, Baltasar Gracián, in his work Agudeza y arte de ingenio, defined "concept" as "an act of the understanding that expresses the correspondence between objects". Conceptismo is characterized by a search for conciseness of expression with maximum significance in as few words as possible (mot juste), especially in a way that suggests various meanings, as long as it is relevant to the theme of the work.

Conceptismo works with the meanings of words and their relationships, often in the service of rhetoric. The most common means of achieving this are ellipsis, zeugma, amphibology, polysemy, antithesis, equivocation, parody, or puns.

In line with other baroque styles, conceptismo upheld the aesthetic value of the difficulties of language, thus Gracián declared:

"La verdad, cuanto más dificultosa, es más agradable, y el conocimiento que cuesta es más estimado." "Truth, when it is more difficult, is more pleasant, and knowledge that costs is more valued."

The most prominent writer of Castilian conceptismo is Francisco de Quevedo, who wrote with an ironic style and satirical wit. Other adherents of this style include Baltasar Gracián.

== Contrast with culteranismo ==
Conceptismo contrasts starkly with culteranismo, another movement of the Baroque period, which is characterized by ostentatious vocabulary, complex syntactical order, multiple, complicated metaphors, but highly conventional content.

To rephrase, where conceptismo values few words with high significance, culteranismo values elaborate vocabulary with relative significance. They both are concerned with what Gracián identified as the value of the difficulty of language.

One should not assume conceptismo is simpler than culteranismo because of its simpler vocabulary—conceptismo disguises its complexity through a variety of techniques, some of which are listed above. Likewise, one should not assume culteranismo is less meaningful or profound than conceptismo because it emphasizes the "exterior" of the work—it can be equally as meaningful as conceptismo, and it is simply a matter of whether the meaning is revealed in the "exterior" or "interior" of the work.

The best-known representative of Spanish culteranismo, Luis de Góngora, had an ongoing feud with Francisco de Quevedo in which they each criticized the other's writing and personal life.

== Italian concettismo ==
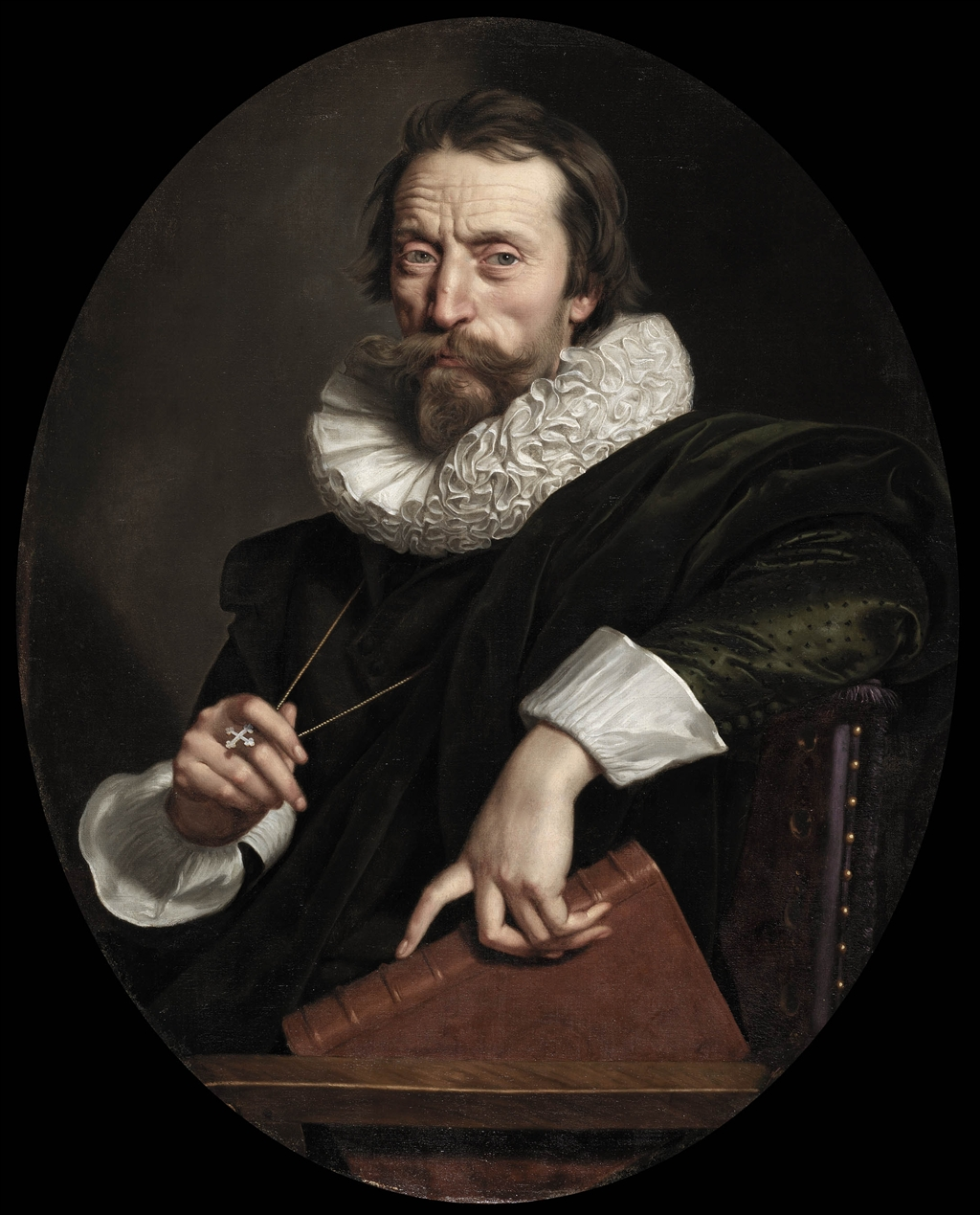
Portrait of Giovanni Battista Marino by Frans Pourbus the Younger

Italian concettismo deployed complex, far-fetched comparisons, paradoxes, and paralogical statements (acutezze) in order to exhibit the writer's genius and ingenuity (ingegno), and provoke wonder (meraviglia) in the reader. The term, which derives from concetto (from the Latin concipere, 'to conceive'), had been used since Petrarch to denote the idea behind a work of art. Increasingly in late Renaissance poetics, and most notably in Camillo Pellegrino's Del concetto poetico of about 1592, it indicated a novel insight into the nature of things and the hidden relation between them, particularly as captured by expanded metaphors or chains of metaphors. The theory of the concetto thus promised to resolve the conflicting claims of ornament and edification, which was also increasingly a conflict between individuality of expression and adherence to the cultural norms of the day. The actual practice originates in stylistic traits found in Petrarch. These were played down by Pietro Bembo and his followers, then rediscovered and developed in the commercialized, competitive climate of late 16th-century letters. Some scholars assign a pivotal role to Luigi Tansillo, or, more frequently, to Torquato Tasso, while others emphasize the influence of Counter-Reformation church oratory. In any event, by the 1590s poets like Guido Casoni and Cesare Rinaldi were producing verse characterized by extended metaphors which went well beyond the orthodox Petrarchist canon. They were rapidly followed (in some cases parodied) by poets of the next generation, most notably Tommaso Stigliani and Giambattista Marino. The success of the latter's Rime (1602, with over thirty further editions in the next seventy years) led to his identification as the leader of the new poetic style, which has consequently been dubbed Marinism, a term unknown in the 17th century, though Stigliani derogatively described his rival's supporters as 'marineschi'. Marino's importance should not be underestimated, particularly his role in fostering a new self-consciousness among writers, but recent studies have suggested that far from being the inventor of the new style, he may not even be its most representative exponent, and that the term marinista is probably best reserved for a restricted group of partisans and imitators of his peculiar combination of rhetorical moderation and ideological radicalism. In fact, by the 1620s concettismo involved ever more complex, far-fetched metaphors, as well as a use of antithesis, oxymoron, paronomasia, and chiasmus far more elaborate than anything Marino had produced. These formal excesses prompted a wave of criticism, as well as attempts, notably by the poet Girolamo Preti and the theorist Matteo Peregrini, to tread a safer middle ground. A greater challenge came from the Jesuits, who were once mistakenly seen as the promoters or even the originators of concettismo. From 1623 the censors of the order, to whom all members had to submit their work, were instructed to refuse permission to publish for reasons of convoluted style, as well as content. In the years following the reaction to concettismo gained further momentum thanks to official encouragement by Pope Urban VIII of an alternative, grandiloquently classical manner, often designated Baroque classicism. The issues at stake were as much political as stylistic, with classicism increasingly the expression of religious and political absolutism, while many practitioners of concettismo, especially in its more full-blooded forms, were variously identified with religious heterodoxy, republicanism, opposition to Spanish hegemony in Italy, and the interests and aspirations of the provincial petty nobility and professional middle classes. By the 1650s concettismo was no longer the dominant literary style, and, though it continued to be practised in provincial literary circles, it had lost almost all its initial radical charge. Paradoxically, in view of its heterodox origins, it survived longest in the precious, erudite verse of late 17th-century conservative-aristocratic Naples, and the elaborate homilies of Jesuit preachers like Giacomo Lubrano.
