= Girolamo Ghilini =

Italian writer and scholar (1589–1668)

Reverend Girolamo Ghilini
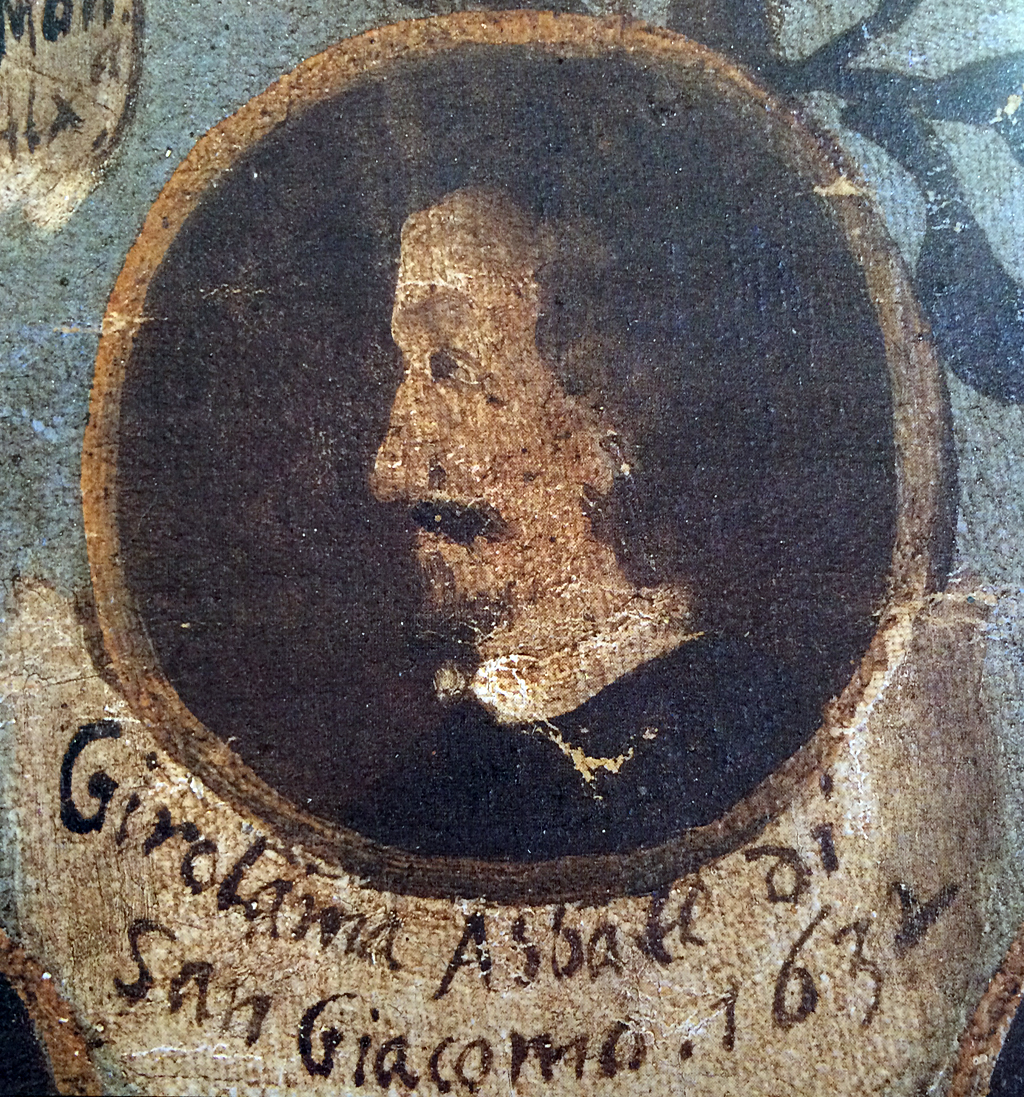
- Girolamo Ghilini
- Born: 19 May 1589; Monza, Duchy of Milan
- Died: 12 December 1668 (aged 79); Alessandria, Duchy of Milan
- Occupations: Catholic priest; Writer; Scholar
- Known for: Teatro d'huomini letterati
- Title: canon
- Spouse: Giacinta Bagliani (m. 1614; died 1630)
- Children: 7
- Parent(s): Gian Giacomo Ghilini and Vittoria Ghilini (née Omati)
- Family: Ghilini

Academic background
- Education: University of Parma

Academic work
- Discipline: History of literature, statistics

Girolamo Ghilini (19 May 1589 – 12 December 1668) was an Italian writer and scholar of the Seicento. Ghilini was the first who used the term statistics in his unpublished treatise Ristretto della civile, politica, statistica e militare scienza (Alessandria, Bibl. civica, ms. n. 7).

== Biography ==
Girolamo Ghilini was born in Monza, in the Duchy of Milan, in 1589. He studied literature and philosophy at Brera, Milan's Jesuit College. He went afterwards to Parma, where he applied himself to the study of civil and canon law; but was obliged to desist on account of ill health. He returned home, and upon the death of his father he married Giacinta Bagliani. After the death of his wife he embraced the ecclesiastical life and resumed his studies, receiving a degree in canon law and theology. Later he became protonotary apostolic and titular of Saint James Abbey in the village of Cantalupo nel Sannio in southern Italy, but he probably never went there. In 1637 he was made canon of the Collegiate of the Basilica of Sant'Ambrogio, in Milan. Ghilini was a member of the Accademia degli Incogniti of Venice. He died in Alessandria in December 1668. He was buried in the church of San Bernardino.

== Works ==
Ghilini's most important work is his Teatro d'huomini letterati (Theatre of Men of Letters), a biographical dictionary illustrious men. The first part of this work was printed at Milan in 1633. A second enlarged edition was published in Venice, in 1647, in two volumes. Ghilini used sources available to him in Latin, including John Pitts' Relationum historicarum de rebus anglicis, published in paris in 1619. Ghilini's work was praised by Adrien Baillet for its accuracy but harshly criticized by Bernard de la Monnoye for its lack of critical judgement. The Theatro is an important source of knowledge on Italian XVII century writers, and is still quoted to this day. Ghilini was the first to give a literary profile of many English writers unknown in Italy in his day, including Geoffrey Chaucer.

== Main works ==
- Teatro d'huomini letterati (in Italian). Venice: per il Guerigli. 1633.
- Annali di Alessandria (in Italian). Milan: Gioseffo Marelli. 1666.

== Bibliography ==
- Media related to Girolamo Ghilini at Wikimedia Commons
- «Girolamo Ghilini Alessandrino». In : Le glorie de gli Incogniti: o vero, Gli huomini illustri dell'Accademia de' signori Incogniti di Venetia, In Venetia : appresso Francesco Valuasense stampator dell'Accademia, 1647, pp. 268–271 (on-line).
- Picinelli, Filippo (1670). Ateneo dei letterati milanesi. Milan: Vigone. pp. 341–2.
- Chalmers, Alexander (1814). "Ghilini, Jerome". General Biographical Dictionary. Vol. 15. London: J. Nichols. pp. 440–441.
- Madaro, Luigi (1927). "Girolamo Ghilini accademico degli Incogniti e la bibliografia dei suoi scritti editi ed inediti". Rivista di storia, arte, archeologia per la provincia di Alessandria ed Asti. XXXVI: 99–106.
- Viora, Mario E. (1947). "Per una biografia di Girolamo Ghilini". Rivista di storia, arte, archeologia per la provincia di Alessandria ed Asti. LVI: 115–116.
- Cherchi, Paolo (1985). "Girolamo Ghilini e le sue fonti per le biografie di letterati stranieri". Studi Secenteschi. XXVI: 209–222.
- Cioffi, Caron (1987). "The First Italian Essay on Chaucer". The Chaucer Review. 22 (1): 53–61. JSTOR 25094030.
- Merlotti, Andrea (2000). "GHILINI, Girolamo". Dizionario Biografico degli Italiani (in Italian). Vol. 53: Gelati–Ghisalberti. Rome: Istituto dell'Enciclopedia Italiana. ISBN 978-88-12-00032-6.
