= Luigi Manzini =

Italian painter (1805–1866)

Luigi Manzini (1805–1866) was an Italian painter of the Neoclassic and Romantic periods, active mainly in and around his native Modena.

== Biography ==
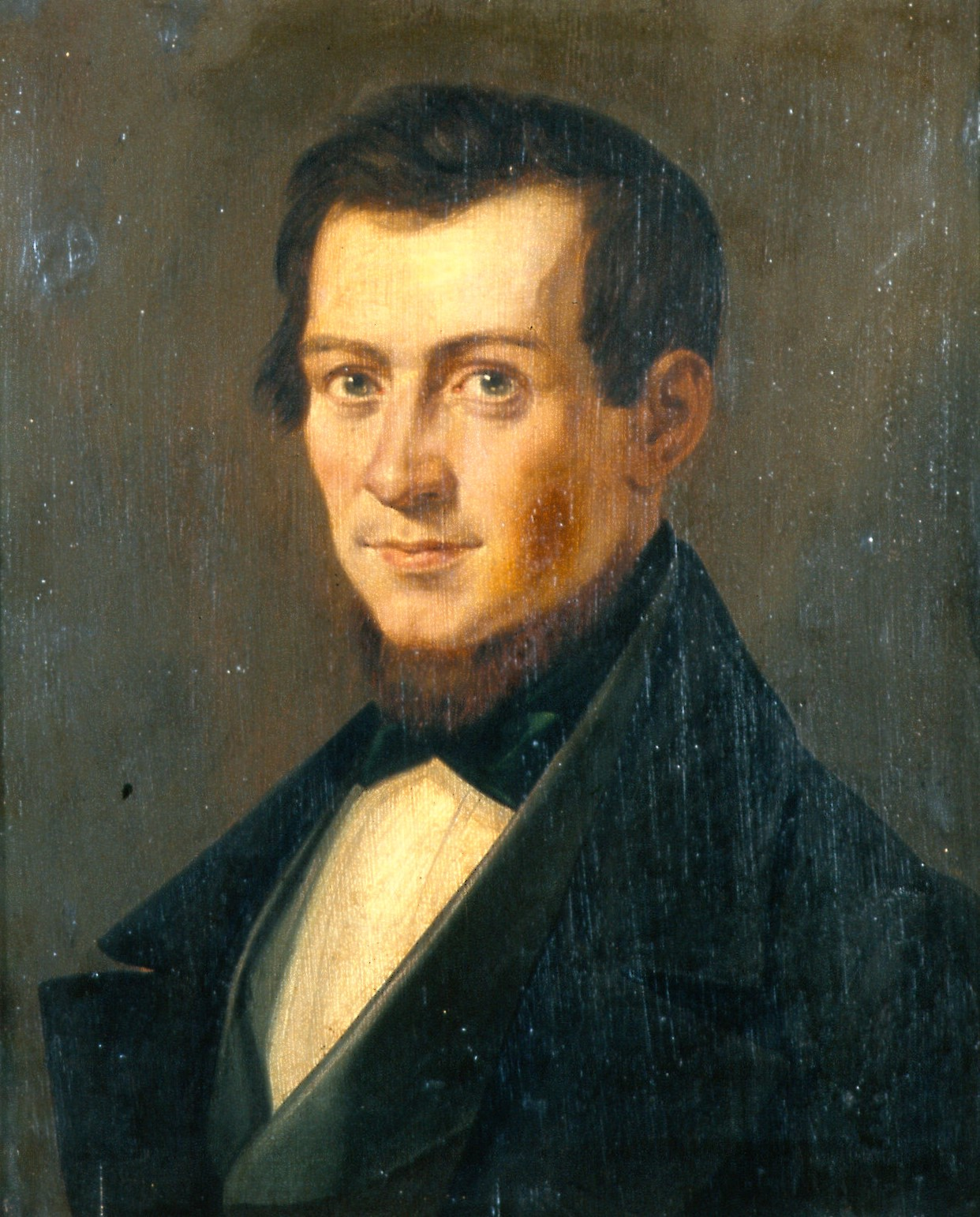
Luigi Manzini, Portrait of Tommaso Rinaldi, oil on canvas, 1850 ca

He painted portraits, sacred subjects, and scenic designs. He studied at the Accademia Atestina and the Collegio San Carlo di Modena. He painted portraits of Francesco IV d'Este for the Palazzo Ducale. He painted altarpieces for the churches of San Barnaba, the Carmine, the Terziarie of San Domenico, and San Pietro in Modena. He also painted for churches in Carpi, Pievepelago, Portile, Castelvetro, and Fiorano. He painted two large canvases, Saints Liborio and Geminiano offer the city of Modena to the Virgen and the Redeemer, and Saints Agatha and Liberata kneeling before a child with Redeemer (1846) for the church of the Santissima Annunciata in Formigine.

He also frescoed a number of palaces. He painted for the church of San Antonio in Buenos Aires, Argentina.

He decorated the ceilings and theatre curtain (sipario) for the Teatro Comunale of Modena, now known as the Teatro Comunale Luciano Pavarotti.
