= Claudio Achillini =

Italian Baroque poet (1574–1640)

Doctor utriusque juris Claudio Achillini
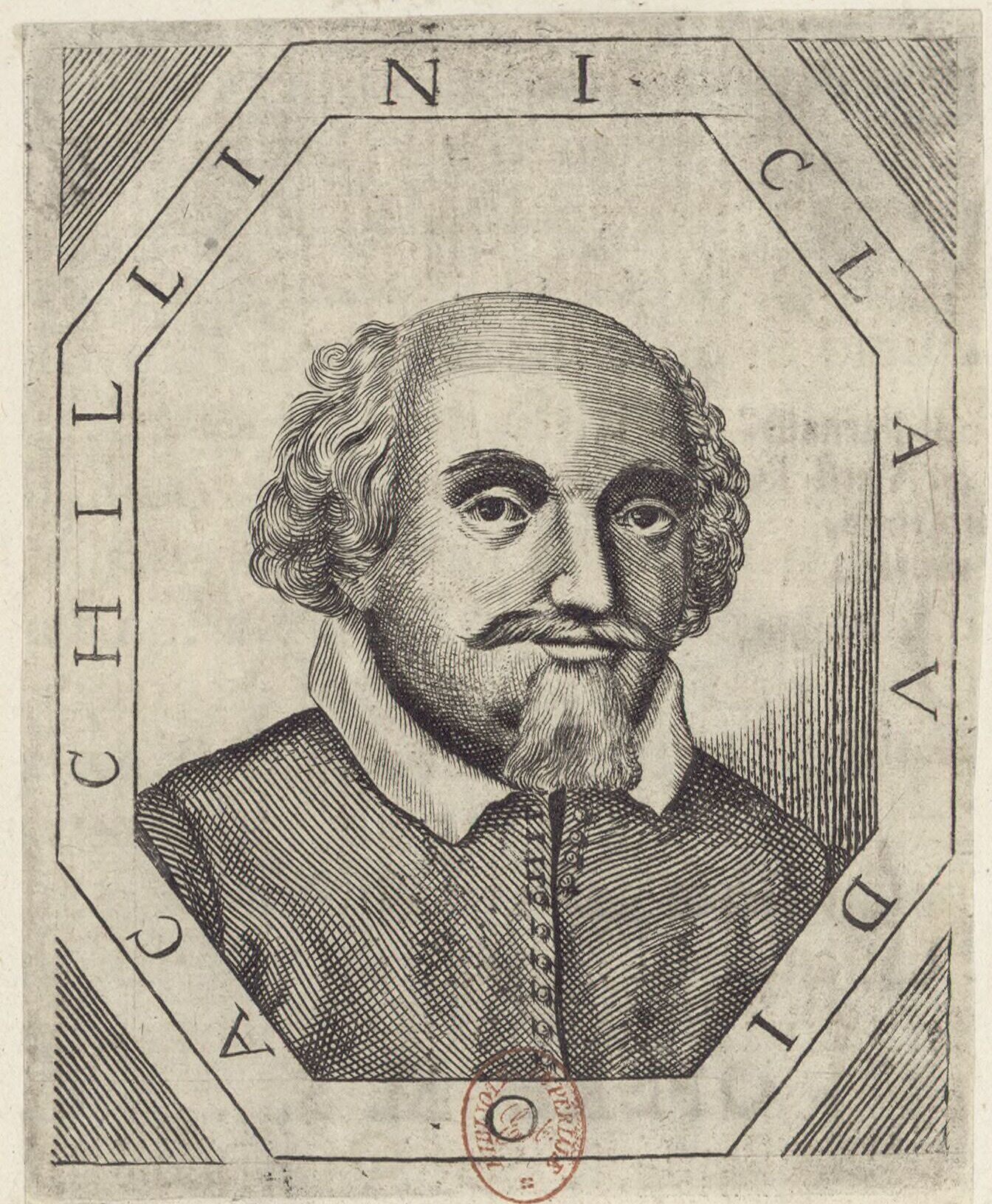
- Line engraving of Claudio Achillini
- Born: 18 September 1574; Bologna, Papal States
- Died: 1 October 1640 (aged 66); Bologna, Papal States
- Resting place: San Martino, Bologna
- Occupations: Jurist; Writer; Poet; Diplomat; University teacher
- Parents: Clearco Achillini; Polissena Achillini (née de' Buoi)

Academic background
- Education: University of Bologna
- Influences: Cesare Cremonini; Giambattista Marino

Academic work
- Institutions: University of Bologna; University of Ferrara; University of Parma
- Notable students: Carlo Cesare Malvasia
- Writing career
- Language: Latin; Italian
- Period: 17th century; Baroque
- Genres: Poetry; libretto; drama
- Movements: Baroque; Marinism

Claudio Achillini (Latin: Claudius Achillinus; 18 September 1574 – 1 October 1640) was an Italian philosopher, theologian, mathematician, poet, and jurist. He is a major figure in the history of Italian Baroque poetry.

== Biography ==
Born in Bologna, he was a grandson to Giovanni Filoteo Achillini and grand-nephew of Alessandro Achillini. He was professor of jurisprudence for several years at his native Bologna, Parma, and Ferrara, with the highest reputation. So much admiration did his learning excite, that inscriptions to his honour were placed in the schools in his lifetime. He was a member of a number of learned and literary societies, including the Accademia dei Lincei.

On 9 February 1621, Achillini went to Rome, where he obtained great promises of preferment from popes and cardinals, but they proved only promises. Odoardo Farnese, duke of Parma, engaged him however on very liberal terms, to occupy the chair of law in his university. He wrote the text for a play with music by Monteverdi presented during wedding celebrations at the Farnese court in Parma in 1628. As Jaynie Anderson has suggested, Achillini may have devised the program for Agostino Carracci's frescoes in the Palazzo del Giardino.

Achillini ended his career in Bologna, returning to a chair at the university, where he was one of Carlo Cesare Malvasia's teachers. Achillini was a particular friend of Giambattista Marino, whose style in poetry he imitated, occasionally lapsing into the excesses of extravagant metaphors. He championed Marino's primacy, particularly in two letters, included respectively in the preface to the latter's Sampogna (1620) and in the postface to his first biography (1625). In the controversies that broke out after the publication of Marino's Adone (Paris, 1623), Achillini apparently encouraged Girolamo Aleandro to write his Difesa (1629) in response to Stigliani's attack on the poem in the Occhiale (1627). Though a strong partisan of Marino, even Achillini tempered some of the more extravagant elements in his own writing in the later years. Twentieth-century critics have in part overturned the terms of the relationship between Achillini and Marino, making evident instead Marino's debt to the former.

His first collection of poems and prose was published in 1632, although he had published many poems in the preceding decades. A canzone, which he addressed to Louis XIII on the birth of the dauphin, is said to have been rewarded by Cardinal Richelieu with a gold chain or collar worth 1000 crowns; this reward was not given, as some have asserted, for the famous sonnet Sudate o fuochi, a preparar metalli (Sweat, fires, in order to forge metal), which was severely criticized by Manzoni.

Achillini's poems were first published at Bologna and were reprinted several times (1633, 1650, 1651,1656, 1662, 1673, 1677 and 1680). He also printed a volume of Latin letters and an exchange of letters with his friend Agostino Mascardi on the plague of 1630, published in Bologna in 1630 and in Rome in 1631.

== Works ==
- Achillini, Claudio (1628). Teti e Flora. Parma: appresso Seth, & Erasmo Viotti.
- Achillini, Claudio (1628b). Mercurio e Marte. Parma: appresso Seth, & Erasmo Viotti.
- Achillini, Claudio (1632). Poesie (1 ed.). Bologna: presso Clemente Ferroni.
- Achillini, Claudio (1633). Poesie (2 ed.). Venezia: presso Clemente Ferroni.
- Achillini, Claudio (1673). Rime e prose. Venezia: per Nicolo Pezzana.

== Bibliography ==
- «Claudio Achillini Bolognese». In : Le glorie de gli Incogniti: o vero, Gli huomini illustri dell'Accademia de' signori Incogniti di Venetia, In Venetia : appresso Francesco Valuasense stampator dell'Accademia, 1647, pp. 108–111 (on-line).
- Asor Rosa, Alberto (1960). "ACHILLINI, Claudio - Enciclopedia". Dizionario Biografico degli Italiani (in Italian). Rome: Istituto dell'Enciclopedia Italiana. OCLC 883370.
- Colombo, Angelo (1985). "Tra "Incogniti" e "Lincei": per la biografia di Claudio Achillini". Studi Secenteschi (in Italian). 26: 141–176.
- Bellini, Eraldo (2013). "Due lettere sulla peste del 1630 Mascardi Achillini Manzoni". Aevum. 87 (3): 875–917. JSTOR 43824619.
- Raimondi, Ezio (1988). "Literature in Bologna in the Age of Guido Reni". Guido Reni, 1575-1642. Exhibition Catalogue, Los Angeles County Museum of Art. Los Angeles and Bologna.
- Slawinski, M. (2002). "Achillini, Claudio". The Oxford Companion to Italian Literature. Oxford University Press. ISBN 978-0-19-818332-7.
- Samarini, Francesco (2019). "Storia dell'endecasillabo infame. "Sudate, o fochi, a preparar metalli"". Parole Rubate (19): 147–165. hdl:1889/4994.
