= Accademia degli Incogniti =

Italian learned society

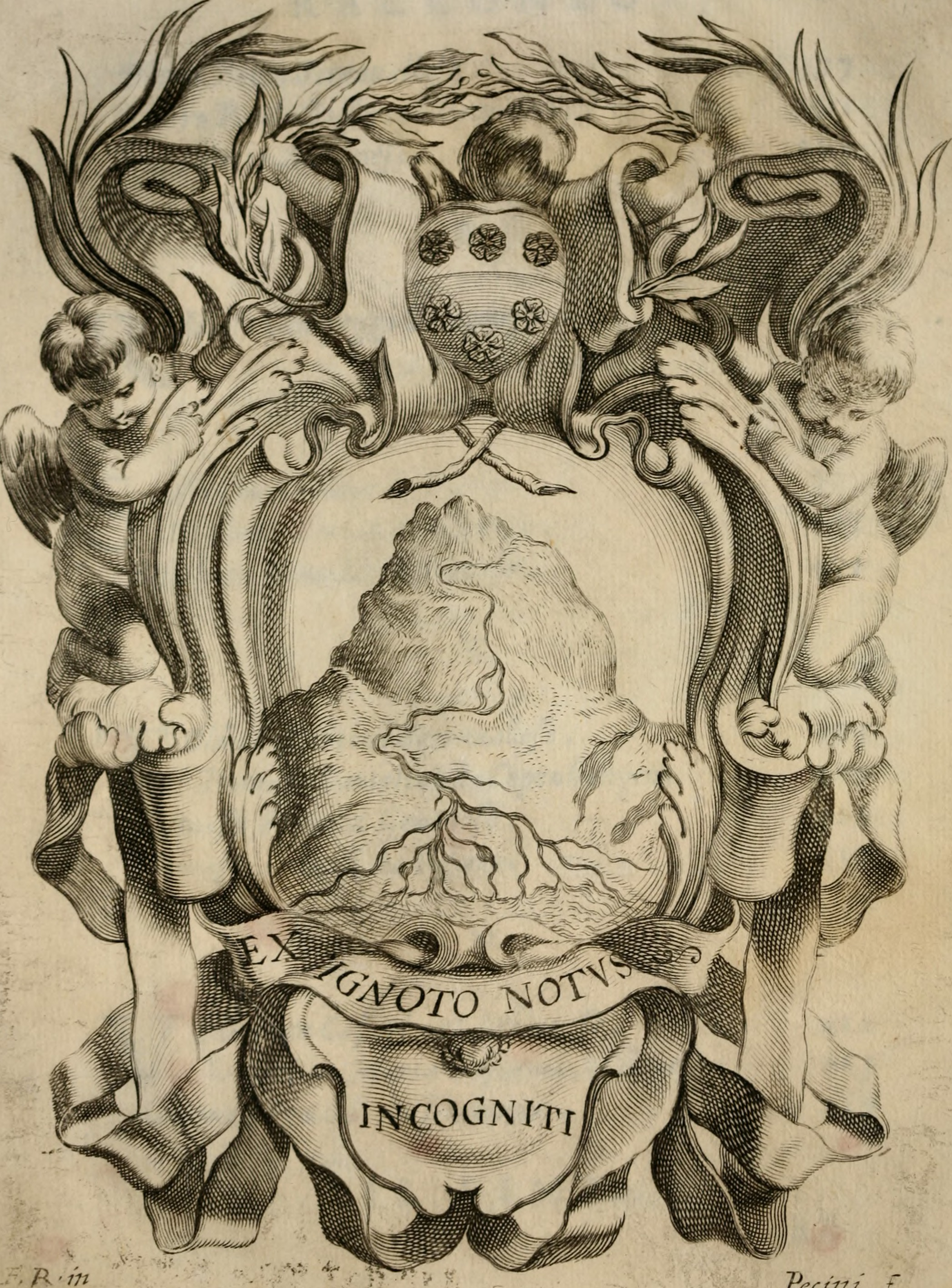
- Coat of arms of the Accademia, featuring the crest of the Loredan family.
- Nickname: Loredanian Academy
- Named after: House of Loredan
- Formation: 1630
- Founder: Giovanni Francesco Loredan; Guido Casoni
- Founded at: Venice, Republic of Venice
- Dissolved: 1661
- Headquarters: Palazzo Priuli Ruzzini Loredan

The Accademia degli Incogniti (Academy of the Unknowns), also called the Loredanian Academy, was a learned society of freethinking intellectuals, mainly noblemen, that significantly influenced the cultural and political life of mid-17th century Venice. The society was founded in 1630 by Giovanni Francesco Loredan and Guido Casoni, and derived its basic Aristotelian philosophy from Cesare Cremonini, a Peripatetic who was a professor of philosophy at the University of Padua. The society included historians, poets, and librettists.

== History ==
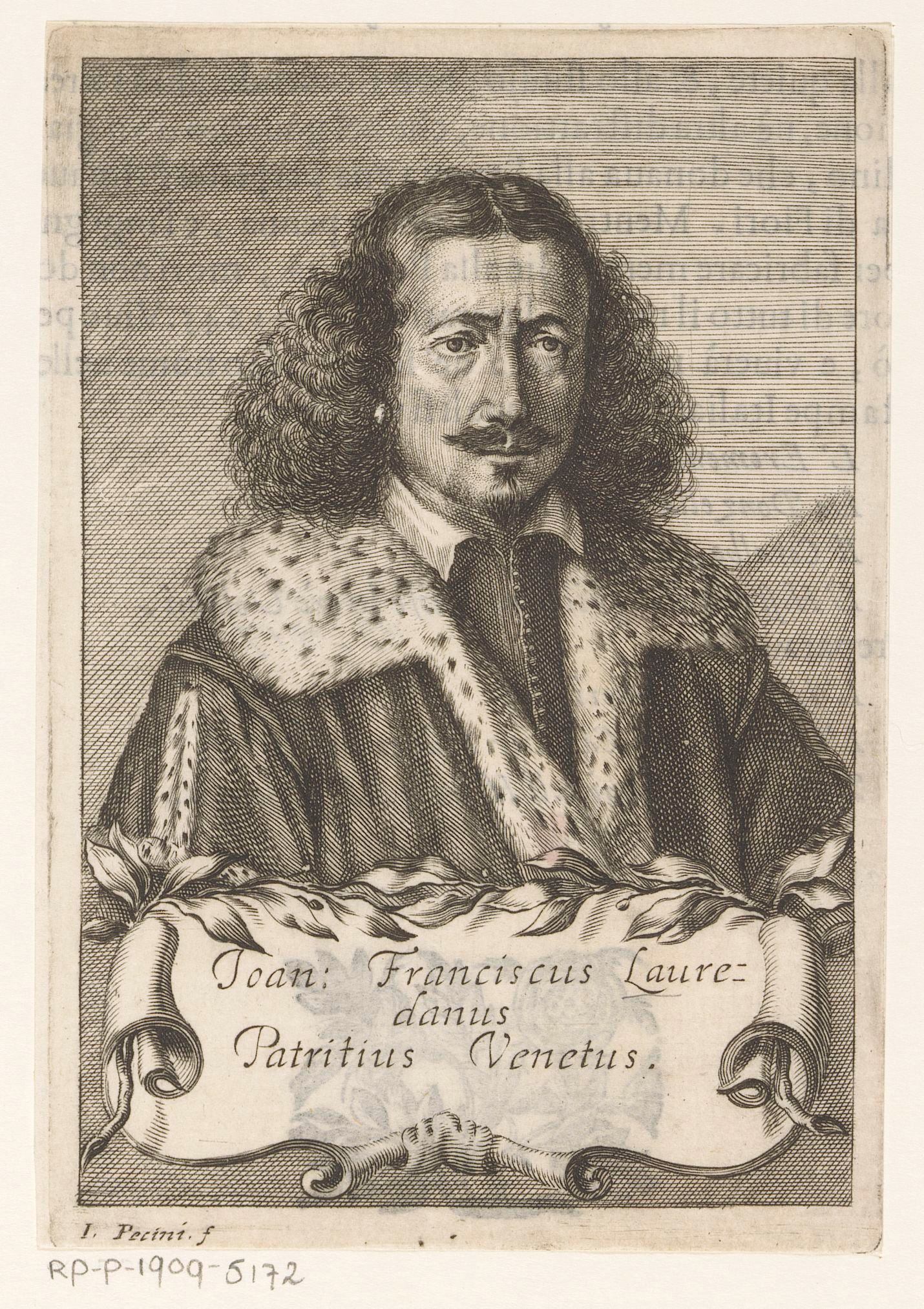
Giovanni Francesco Loredan, Venetian senator and writer, and founder of the Accademia.

The academy drew to itself the main literary figures of Venice and others from outside who were sympathetic to a libertine programme and to Venice's political and cultural independence, such as Girolamo Brusoni, Ferrante Pallavicino, Angelico Aprosio, Pietro Michiel, and Francesco Pona. The name ‘Incogniti’ alludes to members' use of subterfuges like paradox, allegory, and irony in order to deflect censure. According to historian Ellen Rosand, the academy, in keeping with its name, usually operated behind the scenes. Members often wrote in a secret language and frequently published their works anonymously.

The academy nurtured the political and cultural values of Trajano Boccalini, as expressed in his Ragguagli di Parnaso (1612–15). Its libertinism was fortified by the Aristotelian naturalism (linked with skeptical and Epicurean currents) taught at the University of Padua, which was attended by the Venetian upper classes. Its general philosophy was that nothing is knowable beyond the world of nature to which we have access by reason alone, that the soul is mortal, and that the pleasures of the senses and the satisfaction of sexual instincts are part of natural life. Machiavelli was an influence through formulating a view of religion as a product of human history rather than divine revelation, exercised by an elite for the purpose of social control.

Hardly surprisingly, the censors often placed Incogniti works on the Index. These works included satirical prose and verse compositions imitating pasquinate, biblical stories turned into erotic adventure romances, collections of novelle praising natural instincts and pleasure, historical narratives (often anti-Spanish or anti-papal), and an array of often hybrid genres, mixing historical, allegorical, epistolary, and picaresque elements. Continuing a practice set by Aretino and the poligrafi in the mid-16th century, Incogniti authors wrote in a lively, contemporary idiom, usually bereft of classical baggage and archaic vocabulary. They wrote quickly on themes of contemporary interest for as wide a readership as possible. Many of their satirical writings were anonymous, with false dates and places of publication, and hence knowingly clandestine. The academy's historical writings were inspired by Paolo Sarpi, as well as Machiavelli and Guicciardini, all of whom were viewed as exposing the workings of tyranny, and so as alerting readers to the abuses of power, both political and religious.

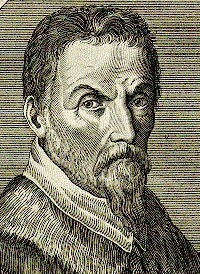
Cesare Cremonini, whose teachings inspired the Accademia degli Incogniti.

The Accademia degli Incogniti was particularly active in the promotion of musical theatre in Venice from the 1630s onward, founding its own theatre, the Teatro Novissimo, which flourished briefly between 1641 and 1645. In their librettos for musical dramas, the iconoclastic intellectuals of the academy set a tone that was "[often] shockingly frank and frequently amoral". Among these librettists were Giacomo Badoaro, who wrote Il ritorno d'Ulisse in patria for Claudio Monteverdi, and Giovanni Francesco Busenello, who provided Monteverdi with the libretto for the composer's final and arguably greatest operatic work, L'incoronazione di Poppea. Although the academy is often depicted as a group of "sceptical libertines extolling a peculiarly Venetian brand of (im)morality", Loredan was a respected senator of the Venetian Republic; other members likewise served the Republic as senators or councillors, and the academy remained an unofficial centre of political power for several decades. Its influence began to wane in the late 1650s, and by 1661, the academy had ceased to meet.

Le glorie degli Incogniti, a Who's Who of the Academy, with a biographical sketch, list of works to date, and a fine portrait engraving for each of the one hundred and two members, was compiled by Girolamo Brusoni with the help of Loredan and published in Venice in 1647.

== Sources ==
- Carter, Tim (2002). Monteverdi's Musical Theatre. New Haven: Yale University Press. ISBN 0-300-09676-3.
- "Operas and Oratorios in Early Baroque Music". Columbia University. 2000. Archived from the original on 18 March 2009.
- Ringer, Mark (2006). Opera's First Master: The Musical Dramas of Claudio Monteverdi. Newark N.J.: Amadeus Press. ISBN 1-57467-110-3.
- Rosand, Ellen (1991). Opera in Seventeenth-Century Venice: the Creation of a Genre. Berkeley: University of California Press. ISBN 9780520934566.
