= List of Marinist poets =

This is a list of people who have been identified as Marinist poets, or marinisti — largely 17th century followers of Giambattista Marino (1569–1625). It comes from the Italian Wikipedia article.

== A ==
- Bartolomeo Abbati
- Cesare Abbelli
- Antonio Abbondanti
- Paolo Abriani
- Claudio Achillini
- Alessandro Adimari
- Agostino Agostini
- Carlo Agudi
- Giovanni Albano
- Lorenzo Alberti
- Girolamo Aleandro, the younger
- Ludovico Aleardi
- Alessandro Aligieri
- Michelangelo Angelico il Vecchio
- Gherardo Ansaldi
- Ciro Anselmi
- Alessandro Arcadio
- Vincenzo Pio Arcadio
- Angelo Maria Arcioni
- Antonio Arcoleo
- Giovanni Argoli
- Antonio Armanini
- Francesco Arnassini
- Giuseppe Artale
- Tommaso Aversa

== B ==
- Arcangelo Michele Baccaretti
- Camillo Badovero
- Antonio Bagatti
- Marc'Antonio Balcianelli
- Francesco Balducci
- Ottavio Ballada
- Bartolomeo Barbato
- Andrea Barbazza
- Bartolo Bartolini
- Andrea Baruzzi
- Giambattista Basile
- Antonio Basso
- Giuseppe Battista
- Ascanio Belforti
- Giovanni Antonio Bellavite
- Francesco Belli
- Guido Ubaldo Benamati
- Giovanni Battista Bergazzano
- Pietro Antonio Bernardoni
- Giovanni Battista Bertani
- Giacinto Bertano
- Fausto Bertoldi
- Giovanni Daniele Bertoli
- Giovanni Bertucci
- Giuliano Bezzi
- Camaleonte Biancardi
- Bartolomeo Bilotta
- Bellino Bisellini
- Pietro Paolo Bissari
- Camillo Boccaccio
- Domizio Bombarda
- Baldassarre Bonifacio
- Giovan Francesco Bonomi
- Giulio Cesare Bordoni
- Giovanni Battista Brati
- Anton Giulio Brignole-Sale
- Antonio Bruni
- Girolamo Brusoni
- Bartolomeo Burchelati
- Giovan Francesco Busenello

== C ==
- Vito Cesare Caballoni
- Francesco Maria Caccianemici
- Scipione Caetano
- Giovanni Battista Calamai
- Giuseppe Campanile
- Annibale Campeggi
- Ridolfo Campeggi
- Giovanni Canale
- Porfirio Canozza
- Francesco Antonio Cappone
- Giovanni Capponi
- Giovanni Battista Capponi
- Lorenzo Casaburi Urries
- Pietro Casaburi Urries
- Giacomo Castellani
- Settimio Castellari
- Francesco Cavalli
- Giovanni Paolo Cechini
- Pietro Martire Colla
- Francesco Contarini il Giovane
- Nicolò Coradini il Vecchio
- Elena Lucrezia Cornaro Piscopia
- Antonio Costantini
- Toldo Costantini
- Lorenzo Crasso
- Nicolò Crasso
- Biagio Cusano

== D ==
- Giovanni Pietro D'Alessandro
- Domenico David
- Ludovico Della Chiesa
- Francesco Della Valle
- Camillo De Notariis
- Francesco Dentice
- Gasparo De Simeonibus
- Agazio di Somma
- Francesco Dolci
- Giuseppe Domenichi
- Ferdinando Donno
- Bartolomeo Dotti

== E ==
- Filocritilo Elpizi
- Scipione Errico

== F ==
- Giovanni Stefano Fachinelli
- Francesco Ferrari
- Mario Fiorentini
- Girolamo Fiumagioli
- Girolamo Fontanella
- Antonio Fortini
- Francesco Fresco Di Cucagna
- Agostino Fusconi

== G ==
- Jacopo Gaddi
- Antonino Galeani
- Paganino Gaudenzio
- Tommaso Gaudiosi
- Giulio Cesare Gigli
- Marcello Giovanetti
- Domenico Gisberti
- Riniero Grillenzoni
- Gennaro Grosso
- Hermete de' Gualandi
- Francesco Maria Gualterotti
- Giuseppe Guerrieri

== I ==
- Giovanni Vincenzo Imperiale
- Gabriele Giovanni Irnei
- Cristoforo Ivanovich

== L ==
- Giovanni Giacomo Lavagna
- Fabio Leonida
- Giacomo Litegato
- Giovanni Battista Lopez Visconte
- Giovanni Francesco Loredano
- Giacomo Lubrano
- Martino Lunghi

== M ==
- Marcello Macedonio
- Benedetto Maia
- Giovan Francesco Maia Materdona
- Giovanni Battista Mamiani
- Giovanni Battista Manso
- Filippo Marcheselli
- Paolo Marchesi Vedoa
- Bernardino Mariscotti
- Francesco Martinello
- Francesco Melosio
- Federico Meninni
- Leonardo Miari
- Pietro Michiele
- Faustino Moisesso
- Bernardo Morando
- Giovanni Battista Moroni
- Liberale Motense
- Gaspare Murtola
- Antonio Muscettola

== N ==
- Anton Maria Narducci

== O ==
- Giovanni Battista Oddoni
- Cesare Orsini
- Pietro Francesco Orsini

== P ==
- Arrigo Palladio
- Pier Francesco Paoli
- Giovanni Battista Paolucci
- Pace Pasini
- Giovanni Pasta
- Andrea Perrucci
- Ciro di Pers
- Pier Matteo Petrucci
- Giulio Piccolomini
- Baldassarre Pisani
- Giovanni Pomo
- Francesco Pona
- Girolamo Preti
- Giovanni Battista Pucci

== Q ==
- Leonardo Quirini

== R ==
- Licinio Racani
- Giovanni Paolo Rainaldi
- Giovanni Giacomo Ricci
- Cesare Rinaldi
- Marc'Antonio Romagnesi
- Michelangelo Romagnesi
- Marc'Antonio Romiti
- Ottavio Rossi
- Giovanni Andrea Rovetti

== S ==
- Giuseppe Salomoni
- Scipio Sambiasi
- Gentile Albertino principe di Sanseverino
- Andrea Santamaria
- Francesco Maria Santinelli
- Fortuniano Sanvitale
- Giovanni Matteo Savio
- Giovanni Battista Sbroiavacca
- Lorenzo Scoto
- Giuseppe Girolamo Semenzi
- Giovan Leone Sempronio
- Bartolomeo Sereni
- Pari Severini
- Domenico Antonio Speranza
- Ermes Stampa
- Tommaso Stigliani
- Francesco Stradiotti
- Giulio Strozzi

== T ==
- Crisostomo Talenti
- Antonio Francesco Tempestini
- Emanuele Tesauro
- Ludovico Tingoli
- Michelangelo Torcigliani
- Filippo Antonio Torelli
- Domenico Torricella
- Bartolomeo Tortoletti
- Domenico Treccio
- Ottavio Tronsarelli

== V ==
- Giovanni Francesco Valloni
- Adriano Verdizzotti
- Giambattista Vidali
- Nicola Villani
- Matteo di Stefano Vitale

== Z ==
- Marc'Antonio Zambeccari
- Cesare Zarotti
- Paolo Zazzaroni
- Gabriele Zinani
- Vincenzo Zito
