= Girolamo Aleandro (1574–1629) =

Italian Renaissance scholar

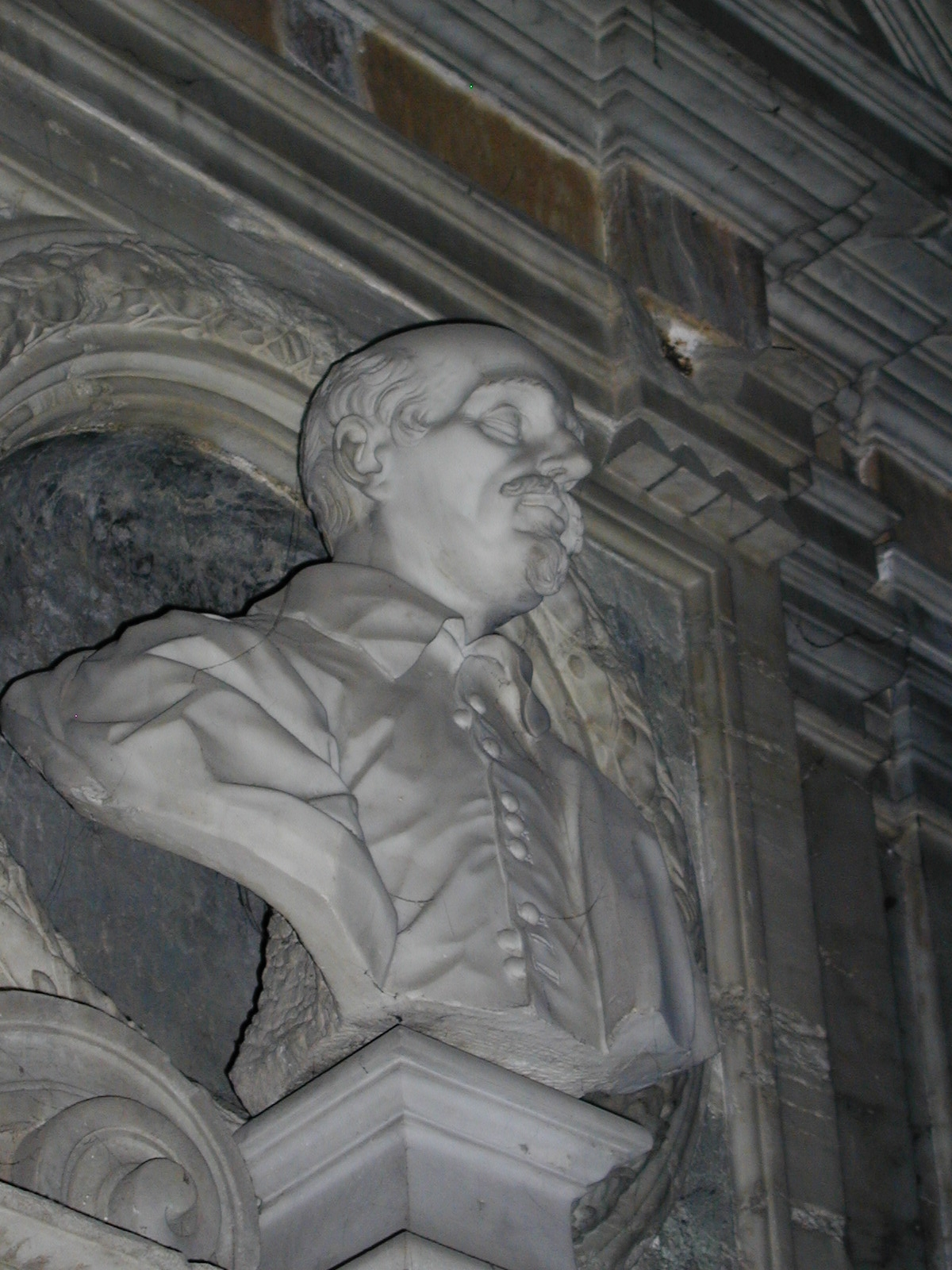
- Antonio Giorgetti, Busto di Girolamo Aleandro
- Born: July 29, 1574; Motta di Livenza, Republic of Venice
- Died: 9 March 1629 (aged 54); Rome, Papal States
- Resting place: San Lorenzo fuori le mura
- Occupations: Scholar; Poet; Diplomat
- Relatives: Girolamo Aleandro (great-uncle)

Academic background
- Education: University of Padua
- Doctoral advisor: Guido Panciroli

Academic work
- Era: Italian Renaissance
- Discipline: Classics, Roman law
- Notable works: Difesa dell'Adone, poema del Cav. Marini, per risposta all'Occhiale del Cav. Stigliani

Girolamo Aleandro, the younger (29 July 1574 – 9 March 1629) was a distinguished Venetian scholar and writer. He was the grand-nephew of Girolamo Aleandro, the elder (1480–1542), the first cardinal appointed in pectore.

== Biography ==
Girolamo Aleandro was the son of Scipio Aleandro and Amaltea Amaltei, the daughter of the celebrated poet Girolamo Amaltei, and was born at Motta di Livenza in Friuli, on the twenty ninth of July, 1574. Like the cardinal, he displayed great precocity of intellect, and at the age of sixteen he composed seven beautiful odes in the form of paraphrases on the seven penitential psalms, which were afterwards printed at Rome under the title of Le Lagrime di Penitenza: he had previously written a paraphrase of the same psalms in Latin elegiac verse. The epigram upon the death of Camillo Paleotto, printed among his Latin poems, is stated to have been composed in his sleep.

Being designed for the church, he was sent at the age of twenty to the University of Padua, where, under the guidance of Guido Panciroli, he applied himself with great ardour to the study of belles-lettres, jurisprudence, philosophy and theology. At the age of twenty six he published his Commentary upon the Institutes of Gaius, which was well received, and the public professorship of jurisprudence was offered to him by several universities. These invitations he declined, and went to Rome on the suggestion of his uncle, Attilio Amalteo, who speedily obtained for him the office of preposito of Saint Philip and Saint James of Brescia.

He joined the Accademia degli Umoristi, just then instituted at Rome, and embracing all the most learned men in that city, and became one of its most active members; his academical name was Aggirato. He had not long resided at Rome when Cardinal Ottavio Bandini appointed him his secretary, in which post he continued twenty years, notwithstanding the numerous solicitations from other cardinals who were anxious to obtain his services. During this long period he devoted all his leisure to the pursuit of literature and antiquities.

In 1624 Pope Urban VIII succeeded in drawing him from Cardinal Bandini, and made him his own secretary: he also acted as secretary for his nephew Cardinal Barberini, and accompanied him in this capacity and as councillor upon his being sent, in 1625, as legate a latere to France for the purpose of negotiating a peace between France, Spain and Genoa. Up to this period Aleandro, whose constitution was naturally delicate, had accustomed himself to great regularity and simplicity of life; but in France the necessity to which he was subjected of living more freely, threw him into an ill state of health, which compelled him, instead of accompanying the cardinal, who proceeded into Spain, to return to Rome, where he died on the ninth of March 1629.

His loss was deeply felt by Cardinal Barberini, who was greatly attached to him, and, as a mark of respect, ordered him a splendid funeral. His funeral oration was pronounced by Gaspar de Simeonibus. Aleandro was buried in the Basilica of San Lorenzo fuori le Mura. Cardinal Barberini paid for his grave monument; the bust is a work by Antonio Giorgetti.

Baillet, on account of his early proofs of genius, has placed him among his Enfans célèbres par leurs Études. He was one of the most learned men of his time, and his style is commended by Rossi as pure and elegant.

== Works ==
Aleandro's main works are:

- Psalmi poenitentiales versibus elegiacis expressi, Tarvisii 1593;
- Caii Institutionum fragmenta, & epitome cum Hieronymi Aleandri iunioris commentario, Venetiis, apud Franciscum Bolzetam Bibliopolam Patauinum, 1600;
- Sopra l'impresa degli Accademici Humoristi, Roma, 1611;
- Hieronymi Aleandri Antiquae tabulae marmoreae solis effigie symbolisque exculptae accurata explicatio. Roma, Zannetti, 1616 (republished: Lutetiae Paris. 1617, and in Johann Georg Graevius, Thesaurus Antiquitatum Romanarum, Lugduni Batav. 1696, V, ff. 702 ss.);
- Effigies Sistri Ægyptii quod servatur in Musaeo Francisci Gualdi, explicata;
- In Nuptiis M.A. Burghesii Carmen, Roncilioni, 1619;
- Hieronymi Aleandri iunioris Refutatio coniecturae anonymi scriptoris de suburbicariis regionibus et dioecesi Episcopi Romani. Parigi, Cramoisy, 1619;
- In Obitum Catellae Aldinae Lachrymae poeticae, Parisiis, 1622;
- Le Lagrime di Penitenza ad Imitazione de' sette Salmi penitenziali, Roma, 1623;
- Navis ecclesiam referentis symbolum in veteri gemma annulari insculptum. Roma, Francesco Corbelletti, 1626;
- Difesa dell'Adone, poema del Cav. Marini, per risposta all'Occhiale del Cav. Stigliani. Venezia, Scaglia, 1629;
- Additiones ad Ciacconium de Vitis Pontificum. Urban VIII having determined that a new edition of Ciacconius' work should be published, deputed Aleandro and Andrea Vittorelli to the task of editors: Aleandro died before the completion of the work, but his additions, comprising vol ii were printed at Rome in 1630;
- Additamentum ad Explanationem antiquae Inscriptionis Scipionis Barbati, published in tom. IV, p. 597 of the works of Jacques Sirmond.
- The greater part of his Latin poems were published with those of Girolamo, Giambattista and Cornelio Amalteo, his maternal grandfather and uncles, at Venice, in the year 1627.
- His letters addressed to Jean Morin, were published posthumously by Richard Simon in his edition of Morin's Antiquitates Ecclesiae Orientalis (London in 1682, pp. 140 ss.). The greater part of his correspondence with Lucas Holstenius was published by Pélissier.

He also left in manuscript Commentarius in Legem de Servitutibus, various treatises on antiquarian subjects, poems in Latin and Italian, a particular account of which is given by Mazzucchelli.

== Bibliography ==
- Simeonibus, Gasparo de (1636). In morte di Girolamo Aleandro. Parigi: Appresso Sebastiano Cramoisy, stampatore ordinario del Re. OCLC 812069326.
- Mascardi, Agostino (1639). "In Hieronymi Aleandri funere extemporalis eiulatio". Romanae dissertationes. Parisiis: apud Sebastianum Cramoisy. pp. 71–76.
- Gaudenzio, Paganino (1639). Excussio duplex. Prima in obitum V. Cl. Hieronymi Aleandri. Altera politico-literaria. Pisis.
- Liruti, Gian Giuseppe (1760). Notizie delle vite ed opere scritte dai letterati del Friuli. Vol. I. Venezia. pp. 506–536.
- Rossi, Gian Vittorio (1643). Pinacotheca Imaginum illustrium Virorum. Vol. 1. Colon. Agrippinae: apud C. ab Egmond. pp. 45–7.
- Mazzucchelli, Giammaria (1753). Gli Scrittori d'Italia. Vol. I, 1. Brescia: Giambattista Bossini. pp. 424–431.
- Fontanini, Giusto (1730). Aminta di Tasso difeso. Venezia: per Sebastiano Coleti. pp. 136, 169, 292.
- Pélissier, Léon Gabriel (1888). "Les amis d'Holstenius". Mélanges d'archéologie et d'histoire. VIII: 323–402, 521–608.
- Franco Croce, I Critici moderato-barocchi, I, La discussione sull'Adone, in La Rassegna della letteratura italiana, LIX (1955), pp. 422–427.
- Ruth Saunders Magurn, ed. (1955). The Letters of Peter Paul Rubens. Cambridge (MA): Harvard University Press. pp. 450 and passim.
- Benedetti, Andrea (1966–69). "Cornelio Paolo Amalteo, umanista pordenonese". Atti dell'Accademia di Udine. VIII: 97–182, in particular 98 sqq.
- Besomi, Ottavio (1972). "Tommaso Stigliani: tra parodia e critica". Studi Seicenteschi. 13: 3–73, in particular 4 n.
- Slawinski, Maurizio (1988). "Agiografie mariniane". Studi Seicenteschi. 29: 19–79, in particular 40 sqq., 50.
- Jean-François Lhote; Danielle Joyal, eds. (1995). Correspondance de Peiresc et Aleandro. 2 vols. Clermont-Ferrand: Editions Adosa.
- Chiurlo, Bindo (1929). "ALEANDRO, Girolamo, il giovane". Istituto dell'Enciclopedia Italiana. Rome.
- The Biographical Dictionary of the Society for the Diffusion of Useful Knowledge. Longman, Brown, Green, and Longmans. 1842. This article incorporates text from this source, which is in the public domain.

Attribution
