= Accademia degli Umoristi =

Italian academy founded in 1603

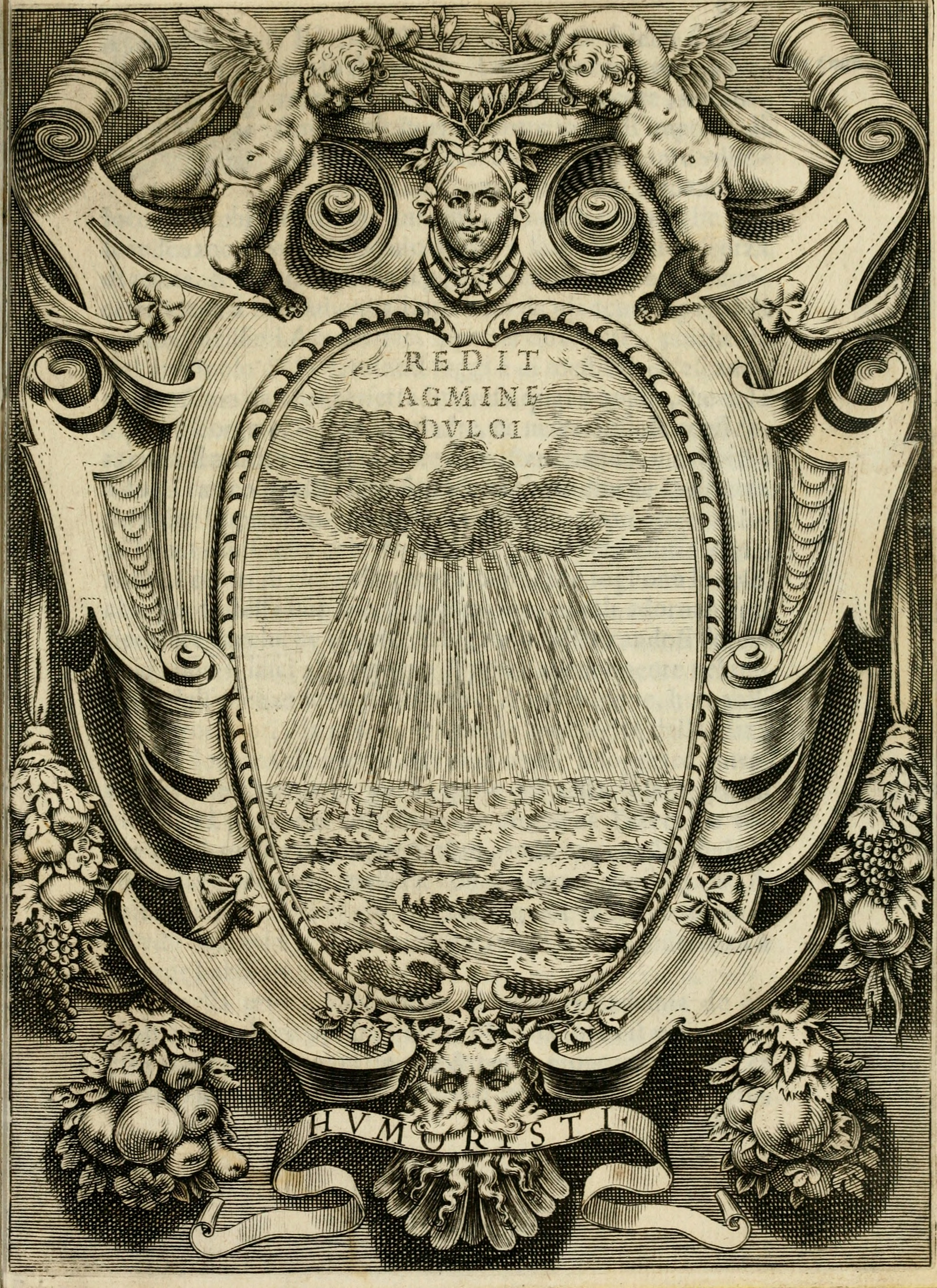
- Coat of Arms
- Abbreviation: Gli Umoristi
- Formation: 1603
- Dissolved: c. 1670
- Headquarters: Rome, Papal States
- Official language: Italian
- Remarks: Motto: Redit agmine dulci ("Returns from the battlefield to sweetness")
- Formerly called: Accademia dei Begli Umori

The Accademia degli Umoristi (Academy of the Humorists) founded in 1603 was a learned society of intellectuals, mainly noblemen, that significantly influenced the cultural life of 17th century Rome. It was briefly revived in the first half of the eighteenth century by Pope Clement XI.

== History ==
The Accademia degli Umoristi, together with the Academy of Arcadia and the ephemeral Academy of the "Notti Vaticane", or "Vatican Nights", founded by St. Charles Borromeo, was one of the main Roman literary academies of the seventeenth century. The society was founded in 1603 by Paolo Mancini and Gaspare Salviani. It began as place for writers and intellectuals to celebrate burlesque and mock-heroic poetry, but soon attracted some of the most prominent literary figures and patrons of the arts in Rome. Thanks to the support and protection that it obtained from Cardinal Francesco Barberini, it became a semi-official institution.

Like all the academies of the 15th-17th centuries, the Accademia degli Umoristi was chaired (or governed) by a Prince, who organized the sessions, directed the work, represented it in other Academies or before the authorities. The office had an annual duration, but could be repeated. The Princes of the Accademia degli Umoristi were among the most prestigious and innovative writers of late Renaissance and early Baroque Italy: Giovanni Battista Guarini (1611), Alessandro Tassoni (1606-1607), Giambattista Marino (1623).

The laws of the Accademia degli Umoristi also allowed for limited female participation. "Feminis primariis ætate et forma prestantibus earumque viris eam frequentandi veniam dabant leges". The Naples-born writer Margherita Sarrocchi was the first woman to be a regular member of the academy. The Coat of arms of the Academy was born on the insistence of Giovanni Battista Guarini (then Prince of the Academy) in 1611: there were numerous proposals and finally what became definitive was accepted: a cloud from which rain falls on the waves of the sea and below towards Lucretian motto «Redit Agmine Dulci» (Returns from the battlefield to sweetness).

The academy did not remain unified for long: in 1608 a dissenting faction founded the Accademia degli Ordinati, and in 1614 another faction founded the Accademia dei Melinconici. The Accademia degli Umoristi became defunct around 1670. In 1717 Pope Clement XI wanted to restore it and appointed Alessandro Albani as prince, not yet a cardinal. However, the attempt was unsuccessful and shortly thereafter the Academy finally disappeared.

== Members ==
- Alexander VII
- Alessandro Albani
- Girolamo Aleandro
- Tommaso Aversa
- Andrea Barbazza
- Sigismondo Boldoni
- Marco Antonio Bonciari
- Baldassarre Bonifacio
- Francesco Bracciolini
- Antonio Bruni
- Giovanni Francesco Busenello
- Jacopo Cicognini
- Clement VIII
- Clement XI
- Cassiano dal Pozzo
- Pietro Della Valle
- Francesco Della Valle
- Giovanni Battista Doni
- Nicolas-Claude Fabri de Peiresc
- Porfirio Feliciani
- Paganino Gaudenzio
- Vincenzo Gramigna
- Giovanni Battista Guarini
- Pierre Hévin
- Lucas Holstenius
- Secondo Lancellotti
- Giovan Francesco Maia Materdona
- Giulio Mancini
- Paolo Mancini
- Prospero Mandosio
- Giovanni Battista Manna
- Giovanni Battista Marino
- Agostino Mascardi
- Gabriel Naudé
- Pietro Sforza Pallavicino
- Girolamo Preti
- Antonio Querenghi
- Gian Vittorio Rossi
- Margherita Sarrocchi
- Agazio di Somma
- Tommaso Stigliani
- Alessandro Tassoni
- Bartolommeo Tortoletti
- Nicola Villani
- Vincent Voiture
- Gabriele Zinani
