= Margherita Sarrocchi =

Italian poet

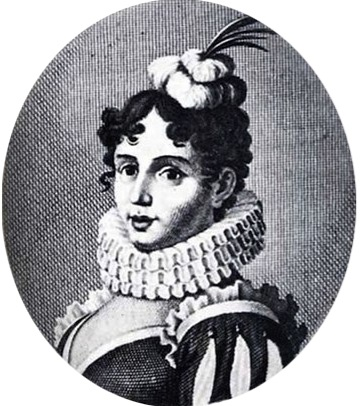
Margherita Sarrocchi

Margherita Sarrocchi (c. 1560, Naples – 29 October 1617, Rome) was an Italian poet and a supporter of the theories of Galileo. She was also a mathematics student with a vast variety of interests in other sciences. Sarrocchi had numerous other scientific interests like geometry, astronomy, and natural philosophy. However, her writings in these fields have been lost or destroyed. Sarrochi's works have been forgotten and left behind like many other female scientists. Margherita Sarrocchi was first friend and potential lover, then rival and enemy of Giambattista Marino, and wrote an epic poem in twenty-three cantos, the Scanderbeide, celebrating the heroic exploits of Scanderbeg against the Ottoman Turks.

== Education and marriage ==
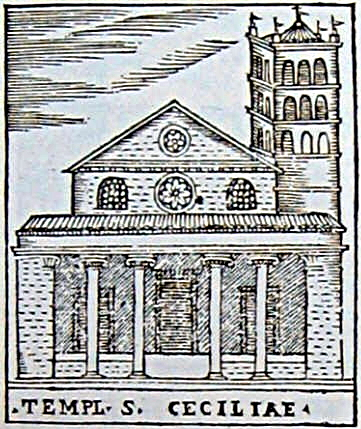
Girolamo Francino, S. Ceciliæ (1588)

Margherita Sarrocchi was born in Gragnano in the Neapolitan area around 1560. Her father was one Giovanni; the name of her mother is not known.

After the death of her father, she was educated in Rome, first at the monastery of Santa Cecilia in Trastevere, then by Guglielmo Sirleto, the Vatican librarian, the scholar Rinaldo Corso, and finally by Luca Valerio, the mathematician and Greek scholar. Valerio, like Sarrocchi later in life, also had connections to Galileo.

At Santa Cecilia, Sarrocchi was implored by her guardian, Cardinal Guglielmo Sirleto, to be educated in the sciences and the arts. Thus she began her journey as an early woman in science. By the age of 15, she published her first poem.

In 1599, she married Carlo Birago, a Piedmontese gentleman. She was widowed in 1613, as evidenced by a letter from Valerio to Galileo dated August of that year.

At the time of her life, women in the public forefront were often not respected. She faced much controversy and criticism during her life for her works. However, she earned the support of many others during her time, including Galileo.

== Academies ==
Sarrocchi joined the Accademia degli Umoristi around 1602, which made her the first woman to be a regular member of an academy. In total, she was a part of at least three formal academies. Additionally, she helped form an unofficial academy called Ordinati after leaving the Umoristi academy. She was very talented, as many intellectuals, such as Niccolò Toppi, reported how skilled she was. Although she had great talent, Sarrocchi was considered to be boastful and relentless to individuals who did not respect or agree with her positions, as she was aware that she was a woman who held great prestige. She was disliked by many, including Giambattista Marino. Initially, these two were close friends. However, Sarrocchi found fault with some of his work, which he took offense to. There is a theory that, initially, Marino and Sarrocchi were romantically involved, but when their relationship ended, Sarrocchi then became bitter with Marino. There is little evidence for this theory.

== Relationship with Galileo ==
Sarrocchi and Galilei probably met in person in 1611 in Rome, where the scientist stayed from 29 March to 4 June. She was there to demonstrate to the members of the Curia the validity of his scientific discoveries which had been made public with the publication of the Sidereus Nuncius. The direct correspondence occurred between 29 July 1611 and 9 June 1612. This handful of letters, together with an exchange of letters with Galileo's circle, testifies to the credit that Sarrocchi enjoyed among the intellectuals of her day, even for skills in astronomy, geometry and physics. Sarrocchi and Galileo continuously wrote to one another. She sought advice on The Scanderbeide as well as corresponding about his findings. Sarrocchi defended Galileo and his discoveries, not only in letters directly to Galileo, but also in her letters to others. Her correspondences with Galileo survived throughout the years, while many other of her works were less fortunate. Only seven of Sarrocchi and Galileo's letters corresponding to Scanderbeide exist today.

Sarrocchi was well known for her gatherings, or as they called them, "ridotto". She would gather great minds of the time and discuss literature and scientific findings. Most notably, Galileo attended these gatherings. Galileo and Sarrocchi became correspondents. They discussed Galileo's new scientific findings, including Jupiter's satellites. As they grew closer, Sarrocchi even sent Galileo a copy of her writing, The Scanderbeide.

Sarrocchi was concerned with the opinions of Galileo on the structure of The Scanderbeide. She knew that there would be many who criticized her work, so she sought the feedback of various intellectuals about The Scanderbeide. She wrote to Galileo and sent him numerous copies of The Scanderbeide until she would receive a copy with no annotations or suggestions. She even stated in one letter to Galileo that, "[she] will accept every criticism you make as a sign of your great kindness and great affection". She strived to make the style more "Tuscan." Together, they wrote to each other to enhance their works. Sarrocchi was looking for ways to enhance The Scanderbeide, while Galileo was looking for support for his accomplishments in order to gain additional connections. He sent Sarrocchi copies of Discourse on Floating Bodies (1612) and Letters on Sunspots for her input. Through her correspondence with Galileo, much is revealed about The Scanderbeide, such as its composition, linguistic characteristics, and writing style. Because Sarrocchi was an educated woman of the time, she sought support from Galileo, and in return, she supported Galileo's astronomical research.

With Galileo's help in writing The Scanderbeide, she offered him a spot in her book. She would use the names of his ancestors and even his own name as characters in the poem. However, his name was never edited into The Scanderbeide.

Sarrocchi was a member of the Roman academies of the Umoristi and Ordinati and of the Accademia degli Oziosi in Naples.

Although Sarrocchi and Galileo mainly wrote to one another about The Scanderbeide and possible edits the author should make to her poem, they also wrote about Galileo and his discoveries. Sarrocchi promised to defend him and his findings in return for his advice on her writing. However, after 1613, their letters stopped and there is no further evidence of their correspondence.

Sarrocchi ended up in Galileo's widespread group of friends due to their correspondence over their scientific and literary works. Galileo intended Sarrocci to be a liaison in his Copernican overtaking of Rome. However, Sarrochi was orthodox, and Galileo's intense Copernican views dissuaded her. The changes in her views of Galileo foiled his plans to use Sarrochi as a way to infiltrate Rome.

== Works ==
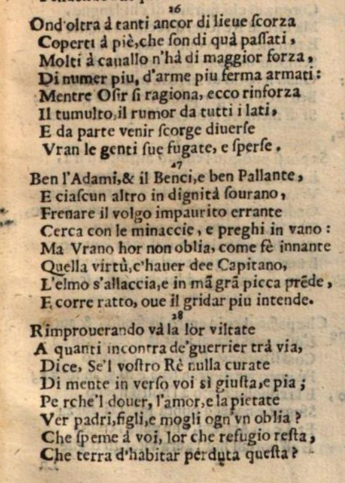
"What hope will be left for you, what refuge, and what land to inhabit, if you lose this land?" —Speech of Vrana (Canto 23) Sarrocchi portrays Vrana as the archetypal Renaissance knight.

=== The Scanderbeide ===
The Scanderbeide, inspired by the exploits of the Albanian freedom fighter Scanderbeg, was published in Rome by Lepido Faci in 1606, incomplete (eleven cantos out of the intended twenty-four) and with many errors. It did not appear again until 1623, when it was published, posthumously, in Rome, for Andrea Fei, in twenty-three cantos, in an almost complete state.

The main character, Scanderbeg, was born in 1405. Scanderbeg fought against the Turks, who were a part of the Ottoman Empire and were great enemies of the Roman Church. In 1443 at the Battle of Niš in Serbia, Scanderbeg and his nephew Hamza Kastrioti defected after the Hungarians overcame the Ottomans. Together Scanderbeg and Kastrioti took fortresses, including Kruja. He relinquished his Islamic faith and fought to maintain his lands and create alliances. These alliances were complex and, at times, unstable. The alliances were eventually called the League of the Albanian People.

Scanderbeg was a skilled leader and fighter, which allowed him to be successful politically and militarily. Scanderbeg attempted to crusade against the Ottomans by working with the church. However, these attempts were not fruitful. Scanderbeg died in Alessio from malaria during a time when his war was not looking favorable. His wife and son moved to Italy.

As well as Sarrocchi seeking advice from Galileo on The Scanderbeide, she also gave Galileo the ability to add a dedication. She stated that she wanted him to write a dedication after reading her writing, to give an educated dedication if it was appropriate.

==== Translation ====
Rinaldina Russell, professor emerita of European languages and literatures at the City University of New York, Queen's College, has produced a partial translation of the Scanderbeide into English prose for the University of Chicago Press: Scanderbeide: The Heroic Deeds of George Scanderbeg, King of Epirus (October 2006).

=== Additional works ===
Sarrocchi contributed to many additional works, some of which are no longer present. For instance, she published a geometry essay on the volume and gravity of solids titled "Ex geometria habentur aliquot eius demontrationes allata ab eodem Luca Valerio in suo Commentatio ad Euclidem." In addition, she wrote a theological treatise about Dominican and Jesuit grace and free will called De praedestinatione. Furthermore, she provided commentary on Hero and Leander, written by Giovanni Della Casa. Finally, she constructed a poem about Felice Orsini for the verse anthology at the age of fifteen and created sonnets written with Torquato Tasso that are believed to be concerned with a spiritual journey.

=== Additional interests ===
Sarrocchi was also well known for being interested in science, specifically astronomy. She was also very interested in astrology, specifically natal charts. However, her research and work in this area was diminished because she was a woman. She was frequently dismissed and her work was often manipulated by men.
