= Bernardo Morando (poet) =

Italian poet (1589–1656)

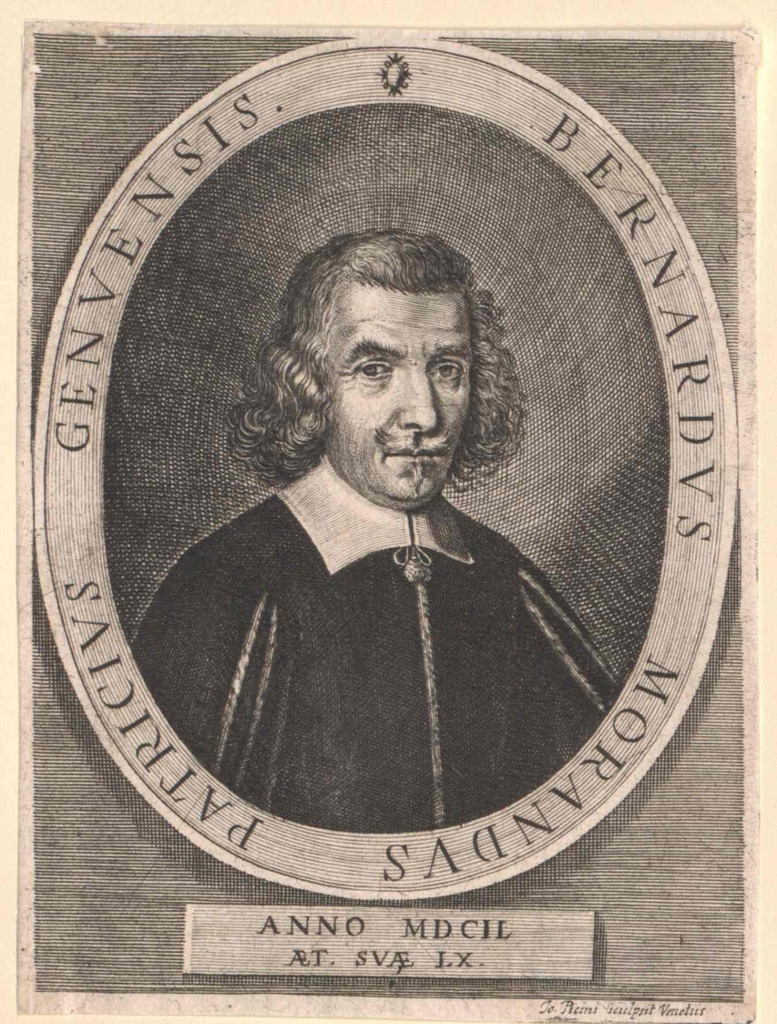
- Portrait of Bernardo Morando
- Born: 18 April 1589; Genoa, Republic of Genoa
- Died: 6 March 1656 (aged 66); Piacenza, Duchy of Parma and Piacenza
- Occupations: Poet; Novelist; Intellectual
- Spouse: Angelica Bignami (m. 1612; died 1651)
- Children: 13
- Writing career
- Language: Italian language
- Period: 17th century; Baroque literature
- Genres: Poetry; novel
- Notable work: La Rosalinda
- Literary movement: Baroque; Marinism

Bernardo Morando (18 April 1589 — 6 March 1656) was an Italian lyric poet, novelist and playwright.

== Biography ==
Born in Sestri Ponente into a wealthy family of merchants, he worked in commerce in Piacenza, where he had the Dukes of Parma as a patron. On 9 January 1612 he married Angelica Bignami, by whom he had 13 children, 4 of whom died in infancy. After his wife's death, he took holy orders. He had a major success, with his novel La Rosalinda (1650), which tells of Rosalinda, a young Catholic girl in London after fleeing religious persecution with other Catholics including Lealdo a man she is in love with. He also wrote about other Mediterranean adventures including shipwrecks, pirates and slavery. The novel, considered "a masterpiece of psychological penetration", was a huge success and enjoyed over twenty reprints. It was translated into French by Gaspard-Moïse-Augustin de Fontanieu (Grenoble 1730; Hague [Paris] 1732). An English translation of the French version was published in London in 1733.

Morando was a member of the Accademia degli Addormentati of Genoa and of the Accademia degli Incogniti of Venice and corresponded with Claudio Achillini, Anton Giulio Brignole-Sale, Gabriello Chiabrera, Angelo Grillo, Giovanni Vincenzo Imperiale, Agostino Mascardi and Fulvio Testi. He died in Piacenza on 6 March 1656.
