= Paolo Abriani =

Italian classical scholar, translator and poet (1607–1699)

- Born: 1607; Vicenza, Republic of Venice
- Died: 26 April 1699 (aged 91–92); Venice, Republic of Venice
- Occupations: Poet; Classical scholar; Translator
- Known for: Italian translation of Horace and Lucan
- Writing career
- Language: Latin, Italian
- Genres: Poetry; translation
- Literary movement: Baroque; Marinism

Paolo Abriani (1607 – 26 April 1699) was an Italian classical scholar, translator and Marinist poet.

== Biography ==
Paolo Abriani was a native of Vicenza, Italy. Little is known about his parents or early life. He entered the Carmelite Order at 20, taking the religious name Francesco. After completing his studies of Philosophy and Theology, he was actively employed in preaching. Afterwards he taught at Carmelite colleges in Genoa, Verona, Padua, and Vicenza. In 1654 he left the Carmelites and became a secular priest. He spent most of his later life in Venice, where he died in 1699, at the age of 92.

Abriani is best remembered for his translations of Horace's Ars Poetica and Odes (1663 and 1680). In his translations Abriani tries to adapt classical meters to a vernacular, thus anticipating Giosuè Carducci's Barbarian Odes. Abriani's translation were a great success, and were often reprinted.

== Works ==
Abriani's Poesie, first published in 1663, belong to the Venetian branch of Marinism, in which sensuality is strictly controlled by moral, even moralistic, considerations. He published a collection of academical discourses on literary and antiquarian topics, entitled Fonghi because they grew, as he said, like mushrooms in his uncultivated mind.

Among his other works are particularly important:

- Il Vaglio, a defence of Torquato Tasso's Jerusalem Delivered against the remarks of Matthew Ferchi (Venice, 1663; 1687);
- L'Arte poetica di Horatio tradotta in versi sciolti (ibid. 1663);
- Ode di Horatio con la ristampa della poetica (ibid. 1680);
- La guerra civile ovvero Farsaglia di M. Anneo Lucano, a translation of Lucan's Pharsalia (ibid. 1668).

== Bibliography ==
- Diffley, P. (2002). "Abriani, Paolo". The Oxford Companion to Italian Literature. Oxford University Press. ISBN 978-0-19-818332-7.
- This article incorporates public domain material from McClintock, John; Strong, James (1867–1887). Cyclopædia of Biblical, Theological and Ecclesiastical Literature. Harper and Brothers.
- Chalmers, Alexander (1812). "Abriani, Paul". General Biographical Dictionary. Vol. 1. London: J. Nichols. pp. 75–76.
- "Abriani (Paul)". Dictionnaire historique, critique et bibliographique. Vol. 1. Paris: Chez Ménard et Desenne. 1821. p. 57.
- "Abriani (Paul)". Encyclopédie Catholique. Vol. 1. Paris: Parent-Desbarres. 1839. p. 91.
- "Abriani (Paul)". La Grande Encyclopédie. Vol. 1. Paris: H. Lamirault. 1886. p. 140.
- Asor Rosa, Alberto (1960). "ABRIANI, Paolo". Dizionario Biografico degli Italiani (in Italian). Vol. 1: Aaron–Albertucci. Rome: Istituto dell'Enciclopedia Italiana. pp. 523–524. OCLC 883370.
