= Sigismondo Boldoni =

Italian writer, philosopher, and physician

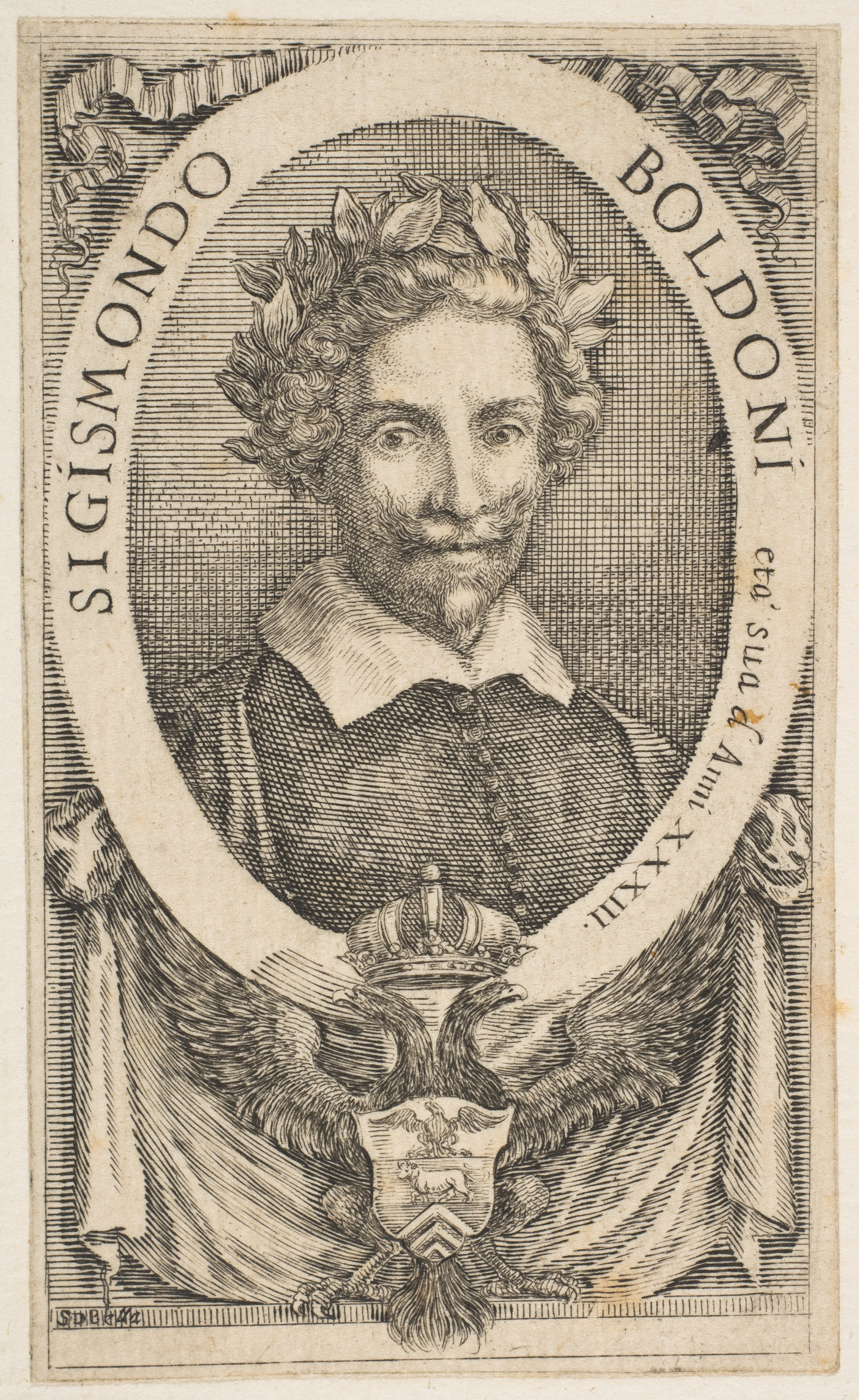
- Portrait of Sigismondo Boldoni, c. 1629
- Born: 5 July 1597; Bellano, Duchy of Milan
- Died: 3 July 1630 (aged 32); Pavia, Duchy of Milan
- Education: University of Padua
- Occupations: Writer; Philosopher; Physician; University teacher
- Parent(s): Ottavio Boldoni and Cecilia Boldoni (née Cattaneo)
- Writing career
- Language: Italian, Latin
- Genres: Poetry; treatise
- Notable works: Larius; La Caduta dei Longobardi
- Literary movement: Baroque

Sigismondo Boldoni (5 July 1597 – 3 July 1630) was an Italian writer, philosopher, and physician. Boldoni was born in Bellano and died in Pavia from the plague shortly before his 33rd birthday. At the time of his death he held the principal chair in philosophy at the University of Pavia. His literary works included a description of the geography and history of Lake Como entitled Larius and the epic poem La caduta de' Longobardi (The Fall of the Lombards). His letters of 1629 describing the advance of invading German armies in the region around Lake Como and the plague epidemic they brought in their wake were used by Manzoni as a source for his 1827 novel The Betrothed (I promessi sposi).

== Life ==
Boldoni was one of seven siblings born to a prominent family in Bellano on the shores of Lake Como. His brothers Giovanni Nicolò, Ottavio, Flavio, and Aurelio and his sisters Aurelia and Livia all later became writers of some note. (Note: Livia married into the House of Scotti and Aurelia into the House of Castiglione. Flavio became a noted jurist. Both Giovanni Nicolò and Ottavio became members of the Barnabite Order, while Aurelio served as the Provost of the Chiesa di San Stefano in Broglio in Milan.) Boldoni's mother was Cecilia Cattaneo di Primaluna. His father Ottavio was a jurist and the only son of Nicolò Boldoni, the Italian court physician of Philip II. Little is known about Boldoni's youth. He is thought to have been educated in Como and Milan, and then following in the footsteps of his grandfather he studied medicine and philosophy at the University of Padua.

It was the death of his father in 1615 that led to Boldoni enrolling in the University of Padua. A quarrel over their father's inheritance between Boldoni and his brothers Flavio and Aurelio led to Boldoni wounding Flavio with a sword. Although his brothers pardoned him, he remained subject to arrest for attempted fratricide and fled Milan for Padua where he completed his studies in 1618.

After leaving Padua, Boldoni spent time in Venice, Pesaro and Urbino before moving to Rome where he lived for the next four years. He became a member of the Accademia degli Umoristi and enjoyed the patronage of Cardinal Roberto Ubaldini and Maffeo Barberini (Pope Urban VIII). He was finally able to return to the Duchy of Milan in 1622. Several prominent members of the Roman Curia and the Milanese senator Giovanni Battista Arconati had successfully intervened with the authorities on his behalf over the incident with his brother. Boldoni was given a teaching position in philosophy at the University of Pavia and in 1623 was accepted into Milan's Noble College of Physicians.

By his own confession, Boldoni's passion for writing led to him to devote the minimal amount of his time to teaching in Pavia, and he began writing an epic poem La Caduta dei Longobardi (The Fall of the Lombards). In 1625 he also spent three months in Rome, having travelled there via Bologna and Florence, and continued working on La Caduta dei Longobardi with the encouragement of the poet Alessandro Tassoni. Nevertheless, in 1628 Boldoni was promoted to the most important chair of philosophy at Pavia despite competition from Nicola Sacco who had taught at the university for over thirty years and was considered a renowned authority on Aristotle. Boldoni's literary activity during this time included a lecture on Aristotle's De Caelo, editing Historiae patriae by Benedetto Giovio (the elder brother of Paolo Giovio), and efforts to complete La Caduta dei Longobardi.

Boldoni's letters of 1629 written while he was sojourning in Bellano describe the ravages of the advancing German armies in the region around Lake Como and the plague which the soldiers brought in their wake. Two centuries later, the letters would serve as a source for Manzoni's novel The Betrothed (I promessi sposi). When the plague approached Bellano, Boldoni returned to Pavia. He died there on 3 July 1630, two days before his 33rd birthday. According to the historian Cesare Cantù, he had contracted the plague from a contaminated suit of clothes brought to him by his tailor. Some 19th-century accounts of his life state that shortly before his death, Boldoni had been appointed to the principal chair of philosophy at the University of Padua. However, doubts have been cast on this because the previous holder of the chair, Cesare Cremonini, died a year later than Boldoni and there are no records of him having retired.

== Works ==
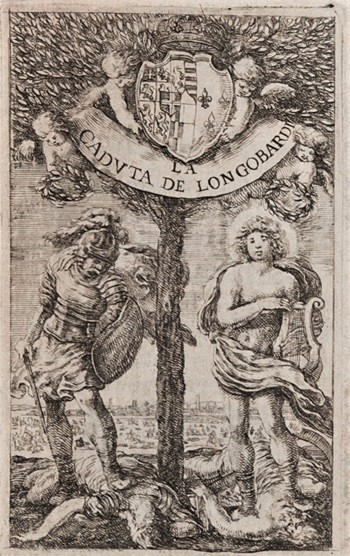
Frontispiece to the 1656 edition of Boldoni's La caduta de' Longobardi

- Larius (Lario). Written in Latin between 1613 and 1615, the book is a description of the geography of Lake Como and was modeled on Paolo Giovio's 1559 Descriptio Larii Lacus. It was first published in Padua in 1617 with a dedication to Ercole Sfondrati, Duke of Montemarciano whom Boldoni credited with having given him the idea for the book. The Sfrondati family also had the fiefdom of Bellagio on Lake Como and owned a large villa there. Boldoni's book had a considerable success and was re-published several times between 1617 and 1776. It was considered remarkable not only for its accurate, detailed descriptions of the geography and landscapes of the area but also for the historical and anthropological descriptions of the settlements and towns bordering the lake and the people who lived there. Larius was published in an annotated translation into modern Italian by Franco Minonzio in 2009 and republished in 2014 under the title Larius: uno sguardo sul Lario di straordinaria modernità.
- Orationibus Patavii (The Padua Orations). These were three Latin orations which Boldoni delivered while at the University of Padua. The first two were delivered in 1616. One of them was on the relation between art, science, and virtue. The other was a funeral oration for Samuele Geusuffio di Longeloy, the Vice-Rector of the university. Both of these were published in the same volume as Larius in 1617. The third oration, delivered on the departure of Nicolò Vendramin from the Captaincy of Padua in 1618, was published separately.
- Apotheosis in morte Philippi III (Apotheosis on the Death of Philip III). Written in Latin to commemorate the death of Philip III, it was published in two editions in 1621, one in Pavia and the other in Antwerp.
- Epistolarum Liber (Book of Letters). This was published posthumously in 1651 in a single volume edited and annotated by Boldoni's brother Giovanni Nicolò. It consists of 186 letters from Boldoni written in Latin and presented chronologically. It includes the letters written from Bellano in 1629 which served as one of the sources for I promessi sposi. A selection of those letters was translated into Italian by Cesare Cantù and published in 1831. Epistolarum Liber also contains several previously unpublished Latin poems and epigrams by Boldoni, some of which were recited at the meetings of the Accademia degli Umoristi during his sojourns in Rome, and a copy of his Apotheosis in morte Philippi III.
- La caduta de' Longobardi (The Fall of the Lombards). Written in Italian, this epic poem by Boldoni in twenty cantos was unfinished at the time of his death. It was published posthumously in 1656 with notes and additions by his brother, Giovanni Nicolò, who dedicated it to Cristina, Duchess of Savoy. Boldoni's feud with his brother Flavio which had led to his exile from Milan in 1616 is fictionalised in one of the episodes of the poem, although the name of the character representing his brother was changed to "Fulvio".
