= Tommaso Aversa =

Italian poet (1623–1663)

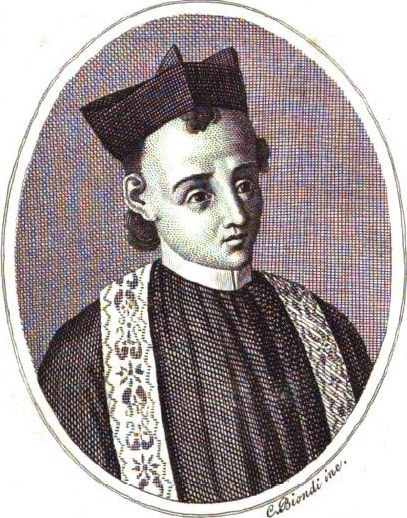
- Tommaso Aversa
- Born: 1623; Mistretta, Kingdom of Sicily
- Died: 3 April 1663 (aged 39–40); Palermo, Kingdom of Sicily
- Occupations: Poet; Playwright
- Writing career
- Pen name: L’Arido; L’Esaltato
- Language: Italian; Sicilian
- Notable work: L'Eneide di Virgiliu Siciliani di D. Tomasi Aversa e Castrunovu
- Movements: Baroque; Marinism

Tommaso Aversa (Italian: [tomˈmaːzo aˈvɛrsa]; 1623 – 3 April 1663) was an Italian Baroque poet and playwright.

== Biography ==
Tommaso Aversa was born in Mistretta, Sicily, in 1623. In his youth, he moved to Palermo where he studied classics. He became interested in poetry and drama under the guidance of Ortensio Scammacca.

He was still very young when the publication of Pyramus and Thisbe, an idyll in the Sicilian language, gained interest from the public, which greatly influenced his work. His most famous work Le notti di Palermu (1638), a comedy written in Sicilian, is considered one of the most important works of 16th-century theatre of the region. The play is also the oldest preserved text of theater in the Sicilian language. A few years before his death, between 1645 and 1660, he translated Virgil's Aeneid into Sicilian, turning it into octaves and publishing it in three volumes.

Aversa was a member of the “Accademia dei Riaccesi,” with the pseudonym of Arido (the Arid). He rapidly rose to prominence; both intellectuals and aristocrats respected him, and among his patrons and friends in Palermo, there were Cardinal Archbishop Giannettino Doria, Luigi Moncada, Duke of Montalto, and Diego of Aragon, Duke of Terranova. Aversa became so close to the latter that, at his particular request, he accompanied the Duke to Spain. From Spain, they traveled to Vienna and Rome. Don Diego acted as an ambassador of the King of Spain, and Aversa was immediately introduced to some of the most distinguished men in Europe. In Rome, he became a member of “Umoristi” and “Anfistili”, where he was known as L’Esaltato (the Exalted).

After his wife's death, Aversa took the holy orders. After his consecration, he immediately returned to Palermo and was designated chaplain of Santa Maria del Fornice by the new archbishop, Pietro Jerónimo Martínez y Rubio.

From that moment until the end of his life, he devoted himself to literary occupations. He died of apoplexy on April 3, 1663.

== Writings ==
Among Aversa's works, the greatest is a translation of the Aeneid of Virgil into Sicilian rhymes. Most of his remaining works are tragedies or comedies.

The following is a list of his works in order of date of composition:

- “Piramo e Tisbe,” an idyll in the Sicilian language, Palermo, 1617, 8vo.
- “Gli Avventurosi Intrichi, Commedia,” Palermo, 1637, 8vo.
- “La notti di Palermu” (Night in Palermo, 1638), later published in Italian as Notte, fato, e amore in la corte delle selve (1657), is considered to be the first comedy composed entirely in Sicilian dialect.
- “Il Pellegrino, overo la Sfinge debellata, tragedia sacra,” Palermo, 1641, 8vo.
- “Il Giorno di Messina, Comedia,” Messina 1644, 8vo.
- “Il Sebastiano, tragedia sacra Palermo,” 1645, 8vo.
- “Canzoni Siciliane,” inserted in vol. II part. 2 of the collection entitled “Muse Siciliane,” Palermo, 1647, 12mo, and 1662, 12mo.
- “In portento canzone panegirica all’Illustriss. et Eccel. Signore Conte Guglielmo Stavata, Consigliero di Stato, e Camariero di Sua Maestà Cesarea,” Vienna, 1647, 4to.
- “Il Bartolomeo, overo il Selim Costante, tragedia,” Messina, 1645, 8vo, and Trent, 1648, 8vo.
- “Il primo tomo dell’Eneide di Virgilio tradotta in rima Siciliana,” Palermo, 1654, 12mo. “Il secondo tomo,” Palermo, 1657, 12mo. “II terzo tomo,” Palermo 1660 12mo.
- “Il Padre Pietoso, comedia morale,” Rome, 1656, 12mo.
- “L’Alipio, overo la colomba fra le Palme, poema drammatico sopra il maraviglioso arrivo dell’osse benedette del P.F. Alipio di S. Giuseppe Agostiniano Scalzo Palermitano, alle Spiaggie di Palma in Sicilia, l’anno 1653,” Rome, 1657, 12mo.
- “La Corte nelle Selve, Trattenimenti modesti ed utili, distinti in più veglie per gli dì di Carnivale. Con gli discorsi di Tomino Amistrato (T. Aversa), ed osservationi di lui sopra la comedia titolata Notte, Fato ed Amore,” with the comedy itself at the end, Rome, 1657, 12mo.
- “Idea, overo ordine delle scene per la rappresentatione della tragedia del Sebastiano: con un discorso academico detto: Disinganno,” Rome, 1659.
- “L’Ormindo, tragicomedia reale per la felice nascita del Serenissimo Infante D. Carlo Giuseppe d’Austria, Prencipe della Spagne,” with a reprint of the “Disinganno” attached, Palermo, 1662, 12mo.

== Bibliography ==
- The Biographical Dictionary of the Society for the Diffusion of Useful Knowledge. Vol. 4. Longman, Brown, Green, and Longmans. 1844.
- Migliori, Anna (1962). "AVERSA, Tommaso". Dizionario Biografico degli Italiani (in Italian). Vol. 4: Arconati–Bacaredda. Rome: Istituto dell'Enciclopedia Italiana. OCLC 883370.
- Leo Allatius, Drammaturgia, Rome 1666, pp. 488, 627;
- Antonio Mongitore, Bibliotheca sicula, II, Panormi 1714, p. 254;
- Giuseppe Emanuele Ortolani, Biografia degli uomini illustri della Sicilia, II, Naples 1818, pp. 13–16;
- Rosalia La Porta-Parlato, Note sul teatro popolare siciliano, Palermo 1917, pp. 47–52;
- Concetta Pasculli, Il teatro in Sicilia nel Seicento, Reggio Calabria 1922, pp. 26–30, 57 s.;
- Enrico Di Marzo, La nuova scuola poetica dialettale siciliana, Palermo 1924, pp. 51 s.;
- Giuseppe Cocchiara, Tommaso Aversa e il teatro sacro in Sicilia, Palermo s. d.;
- Giuseppe Cocchiara, Le vastasate. Contributo alla storia del teatro popolare, Palermo 1926, pp. 25 s.;
- Giuseppe Sorge, I teatri di Palermo nei secoli XVI-XVII-XVIII, Palermo 1926, pp. 126 s., 137 s., 151 s., 176 s.;
- Diz. dei siciliani illustri, Palermo 1939, p. 52;
- Francesco De Felice, Storia del teatro siciliano, Catania 1956, p. 19;
- Teatro siciliano, a cura di A. Mango (con introduz. di V. Pandolfi), I, Palermo 1961, pp. XIV s., 23–61.
- O'Grady, D. (2002). "Aversa, Tommaso". The Oxford Companion to Italian Literature. Oxford University Press.
