= Pace Pasini =

Italian poet and novelist

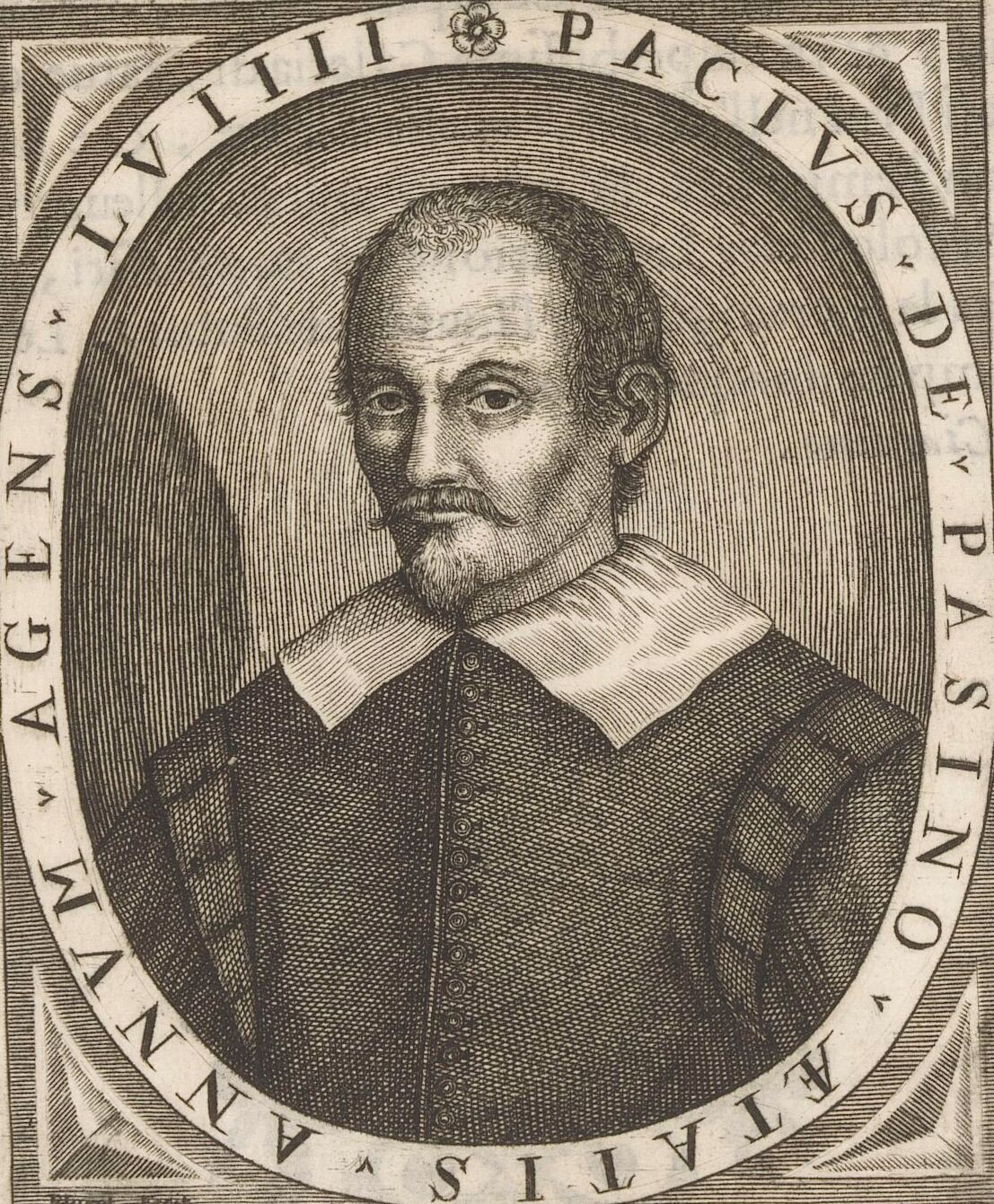
- Portrait of Pace Pasini. From the book "Le glorie degli Incogniti", 1647
- Born: 17 June 1583; Vicenza, Republic of Venice
- Died: 1644 (aged 60–61); Padua, Republic of Venice
- Education: University of Padua
- Occupations: Novelist; poet; civil servant
- Writing career
- Language: Italian
- Period: Seicento
- Genres: Poetry; novel
- Notable work: L'historia del cavalier perduto
- Literary movement: Marinism; Baroque

Pace Pasini (17 June 1583 – 1644) was an Italian marinist poet and novelist. He is best known as the author of the Baroque novel L'historia del cavalier perduto (1644), which may have been a source for Alessandro Manzoni's The Betrothed, and combines chivalric, picaresque, and political themes.

== Biography ==
Pace Pasini was the son of Pietro, a descendant of a family originally from Valle Sabbia, who had moved to Schio and then to Vicenza, where he was ascribed to the Noble Council of the city. In the mid-seventeenth century - around the time of Pace's death - a member of the Pasini family from Vicenza figured among the merchants of silk and thick cloths.

After completing his grammar studies in Vicenza, Pace attended the University of Padua, where he devoted himself to the study of law. He soon neglected his legal studies and took an interest in the new science - he corresponded with Galileo Galilei and Johannes Kepler - and above all in philosophy. He followed the university lessons of Cesare Cremonini, a follower of Pietro Pomponazzi's neo-Aristotelian rationalism who questioned the doctrine of the immortality of the soul and other Catholic dogmas.

Pace was a member of the Accademia degli Incogniti, one of the most active and lively Venetian Academies of the seventeenth century.

Following a dispute, Pace and his brother killed the lawyer Roberto Malo and seriously injured his brother. In March 1624 Pace was sentenced to five years of exile in Zara, later reduced by about half (he was acquitted and released on 28 January 1627).

On 25 July 1630 he was appointed vicar in Barbarano and on 8 July 1635 he was appointed vicar in Orgiano.

Pace Pasini died in Padua in the second half of 1644.

== Works ==
- Rime varie, et gli increduli, ouero De' rimedii d'amore dialogo. Dedicate al molto illustre ... Giacomo Godi. Vicenza: Francesco Grossi. 1612.
- Campo Martio ouero Le bellezze di Lidia, dedicato al clariss. sig. Giulio da Molino, dell'illustriss. sig. Marco. Vicenza: presso Francesco Grossi. 1614.
- Il sogno dell'illustrissimo sig. Pietro Memo. Dedicato all'illustrissimo signor Dominico Molino. Vicenza: Francesco Grossi. 1623.
- La Metafora. Il Trattato e le Rime. Trattato de' passaggi dall'vna metafora all'altra, et de gl'innesti dell'istesse nel quale si discorre secondo l'opinione, e l'vso de' migliori, se senza commetter diffetto, si possano vsare da' poeti, et da gli oratori. Dedicato all'illustrissimo, et eccellentiss. sig. Nicola Da Ponte. Vicenza. 1632.
- Rime di Pace Pasini diuise in errori, honori, dolori, verita, & miscugli. Vicenza: per gli heredi di Francesco Grossi. 1642. Pasini's Rime, characterized by a conventional conceptismo, have appended to them the Trattato de’ passaggi dall’una metafora all’altra e degli innesti dell’istesse, one of the earliest theoretical discussions of Baroque style.
- Historia del cavalier perduto. Venice: Francesco Valvasense. 1644. In a careful comparative study the critic Giovanni Getto analyzes points of contact between Pasini's Historia del Cavalier Perduto, and Manzoni's masterpiece. The similarities are striking. There is the story of a kidnapping: the gentlewoman Luciana Lucia's name may well be an echo) is carried off to the castle of the terrible Strappacuori. There is the description of a flight which bears some resemblance to Renzo's. There are several other analogies, both lexical and plot-related. A series of details, Getto correctly calls them, but sufficient to permit him to hazard the hypothesis that here at last is the anonymous manuscript Manzoni so often refers to.

== Bibliography ==
- «Расе Pasini vicentino». In : Le glorie de gli Incogniti: o vero, Gli huomini illustri dell'Accademia de' signori Incogniti di Venetia, In Venetia : appresso Francesco Valuasense stampator dell'Accademia, 1647, pp. 368–371 (on-line).
- Getto, Giovanni (1960). "Echi di un romanzo barocco nei "Promessi sposi"". Lettere Italiane. XII: 141–167.
- Mantese, Giovanni (1975). "Il Manzoni e Vicenza. Il "Cavalier Perduto" del vicentino Pace Pasini e i "Promessi sposi"". Manzoni, Venezia e Il Veneto. Florence: 89–124.
- Mantese, Giovanni (1976). Il Manzoni a Vicenza. Il Cavalier perduto del vicentino Pace Pasini e i Promessi Sposi. Florence: Leo S. Olschki Editore.
- Marini, Quinto (2014). "PASINI, Pace". Dizionario Biografico degli Italiani (in Italian). Vol. 81: Pansini–Pazienza. Rome: Istituto dell'Enciclopedia Italiana. ISBN 978-88-12-00032-6.
- Mazza, Antonia (1960). "Nota manzoniana". Aevum. 34 (5/6): 573–575. JSTOR 20859363.
- Mura Porcu, Anna (2005). "Note sulla lingua dell'"Historia del Cavalier Perduto"". Sentir e Meditar. Omaggio a Elena Sala di Felice. Rome: 99–108.
- Povolo, Claudio (2014). The Novelist and the Archivist. Fiction and History in Alessandro Manzoni's The Betrothed. Basingstoke: Palgrave Macmillan.
- Santoro, Marco (1981). "L'Historia del Cavalier Perduto di Pace Pasini". La più stupenda e gloriosa macchina". Il romanzo italiano del sec. XVII. Naples: 163–230.
- Slawinski, M. (2002). "Pasini, Pace". The Oxford Companion to Italian Literature. Oxford University Press.
