= Antonio Abbondanti =

Italian poet and writer

- Born: c. 1600; Imola, Duchy of Ferrara
- Died: May 17, 1653; Liège, Prince-Bishopric of Liège, Holy Roman Empire
- Occupations: Poet; Historian; Diplomat
- Writing career
- Language: Italian
- Notable works: Viaggio in Colonia; Gazzette Menippee di Parnaso
- Movements: Baroque; Marinism

Antonio Abbondanti (Latin: Antonius Abundantius; c. 1600 – 17 May 1653) was an Italian Baroque poet and historian.

== Biography ==
We know little of Abbondanti's life. His biography must largely be deduced from his writings. He was born in Imola around 1600, and in 1615 entered the service of Pier Luigi Carafa, pontifical governor of Fermo. In 1624, when Carafa was appointed Apostolic Nuncio to Cologne, Abbondanti followed him to Germany. He remained in Germany even after Carafa's return to Italy, working as secretary to his successors as nuncio. In 1630 Abbondanti made a journey through the Spanish Netherlands, and in Liège he published a narrative poem on the biblical figure of Judith and a panegyric of the Count of Tilly. As a result of his trip he later (1641) published his Breviario delle guerre dei Paesi Bassi, an account of the Eighty Years' War based on literary sources. In 1651–1652 he took on the role of nuncio ad interim. In 1652 he retired to Liège, where he held a canonry in the chapter of St Paul's minster (now Liège Cathedral). He died in Liège on 17 May 1653, and was buried in a side chapel of St Paul's. Abbondanti was a member of the Bolognese Accademia degli Innominati, assuming the pseudonym of Avvivato.

== Works ==
A devotee of marinism in the manner of those who fought for literary independence (Caporali, Boccalini, Tassoni), Abbondanti was a nonconformist disciple of the writers of satira regolare. He wrote in a hispanized Italian. His main work consisted of the ten Capitoli in terza rima of his Gazzette Menippee di Parnaso (Menippean journals of Parnassus, 1629), in which he revealed himself as a reactionary, an archenemy of Galileo, and a shrewd connoisseur of politics, princes, and prelates. His Viaggio in Colonia (Journey to Cologne, 1625) is considered one of the most brilliant satirical poems of the 17th century. Written in the style of Francesco Berni, it narrates in a caustic way the journey from Fermo to Cologne, which Abbondanti undertook in the service of Carafa. Combining real events with imaginary ones, the poem proved extremely popular. Abbondanti's Encomio di Napoli, published in the Venice edition of the Gazzette Menippee di Parnaso (1629), was reissued by Benedetto Croce in his Nuovi saggi sulla letteratura italiana del Seicento.

== List of works ==
- Viaggio in Colonia. Cologne. 1625.
- Gazzette Menippee di Parnaso. Venice: Francesco Baba. 1629.
- La Giuditta e le rime sacre, morali, e varie. Liège: Jean Ouwerx. 1630.
- L'Ercole cristiano rappresentante l'illustrissimo ... conte Giovanni di Tilli, generale dell'armi cesaree et della lega cattolica, panegirico di Antonio Abbondanti, da Imola. Liège: Jean Ouwerx. 1630.
- Breviario delle guerre dei Paesi Bassi. Cologne: Andreas Bingen. 1641.

== Bibliography ==
- Orlandelli, Gianfranco (1960). "Abbondanti, Antonio". Dizionario Biografico degli Italiani (in Italian). Vol. 1: Aaron–Albertucci. Rome: Institute of the Italian Encyclopaedia. pp. 39–40. OCLC 883370.
- Maquet, Albert (1999). "Abbondanti, Antonio" (PDF). Nouvelle Biographie Nationale. Vol. 5. pp. 11–12.
- Diffley, Paul (2002). "Abbondanti, Antonio". The Oxford Companion to Italian Literature. Oxford University Press.
