= Gabriele Zinani =

Italian writer (1557-c. 1634)

- Born: 1557; Reggio Emilia, Duchy of Ferrara
- Died: c. 1634
- Education: University of Ferrara
- Occupations: Poet; Playwright; Political theorist
- Parent(s): Bartolomeo Zinani and Lucrezia Zinani (née Calcagni)
- Writing career
- Language: Italian
- Notable works: L'Almerigo; L'Eracleide
- Movements: Baroque; Marinism

Gabriele Zinani (or Zinano) (1557 – after 1634) was an Italian poet, playwright, and political theorist.

== Biography ==
Gabriele Zinani was born in Reggio Emilia in 1557 to Bartolomeo Zinani and Lucrezia Calcagni. Between 1578 and 1581 he studied at the University of Ferrara, where Cesare Cremonini and Franciscus Patricius were among his professors. In 1581 he went back to his native Reggio Emilia, where he resided until 1591. After 1591 he moved away from Reggio Emilia in search of fortune, going as far as Hungary, where he fought in the Long Turkish War in 1596. Back in Italy, he initially settled in Rome, where he was admitted a member of the Accademia degli Umoristi. In 1598 he moved to Naples, where he remained until 1622. He then moved to Venice, where he directly supervised the publication of his works. Zinani was a close friend of Torquato Tasso, Giambattista Marino, and Angelo Grillo. He edited the second edition of Giovanni Battista Manso's Vita di Torquato Tasso (Rome 1634). He died shortly after 1634.

== Main works ==
Zinani's main work, the epic poem Eracleide, dealt with the struggles of the Byzantine emperor Heraclius against the Sasanian Empire. Among Zinani's works is Amerigo, (1590), which Tiraboschi ranked with the best Italian tragedies of the 16th century. Zinani was a close friend of Sara Copia Sulam. He regularly attended her salon and had a poetry exchange with her that was later included in his Rime diverse (Venice: Evangelista Deuchino, 1627). His political treatises Il Consigliere (Venice 1625) and Della Ragion di stato (Venice 1626) were translated into Latin by Ludwig von Hörnigk and published in Frankfurt in 1628.

== Works ==
- Il Caride fauola pastorale. Parma: Erasmo Viotti. 1582.
- L'Almerigo. Reggio Emilia: Ercoliano Bartoli. 1590.
- Le due giornate della ninfa. Reggio Emilia: Ercoliano Bartoli. 1590.
- Il sogno, ouero della poesia. Reggio Emilia: Ercoliano Bartoli. 1590.
- Sommarii di varie retoriche greche, latine, et volgari. Reggio Emilia: Ercoliano Bartoli. 1590.
- L'amante secondo, ouer'arte di conoscere gli adulatori. Parma: Erasmo Viotti. 1591.
- L'amata, ouero della virtù heroica. Reggio Emilia: Ercoliano Bartoli. 1591.
- L'amico, ouer del sospiro. Reggio Emilia: Ercoliano Bartoli. 1591.
- Il soldato, ouer della fortezza. Reggio Emilia: Ercoliano Bartoli. 1591.
- Conclusioni amorose di Gabriele Zinano. Parma: Erasmo Viotti. 1591.
- Delle rime et prose di Gabriele Zinano. Reggio Emilia: Ercoliano Bartoli. 1591.
- L'Eracleide. Venice: Evangelista Deuchino. 1623.

== Bibliography ==
- Diffley, P. (2002). Zinani, Gabriele. Oxford University Press. ISBN 978-0-19-818332-7.
- Tarzia, Fabio (2020). "ZINANO, Gabriele". Dizionario Biografico degli Italiani (in Italian). Vol. 100: Vittorio Emanuele I–Zurlo. Rome: Istituto dell'Enciclopedia Italiana. ISBN 978-88-12-00032-6.
- Tiraboschi, Girolamo (1784). Biblioteca modenese o Notizie della vita e delle opere degli scrittori natii degli stati del serenissimo signor duca di Modena. Vol. 5. Modena: presso la Società Tipografica. pp. 415–433.
- Michèle Gendreau, “Quevedo lecteur de l'Eracleide de Gabriele Zinano”, Mélanges offert à Charles Vincent Aubrun, Haïm Vidal Séphiha (ed.), (Paris: Editions Hispaniques, 1975), 2 vols., 1, 313–320.
