= Bartolomeo Dotti =

Italian satirical poet (1651 – 1713)

- Born: 1651; Brescia, Republic of Venice
- Died: 7 November 1713 (aged 61–62); Venice, Republic of Venice
- Occupations: Poet; Intellectual; Soldier
- Writing career
- Parent(s): Pasquino Dotti and Ottavia Dotti (née Vinacesi)
- Language: Italian language
- Period: 17th century; Baroque
- Genres: Poetry; satire
- Notable work: Satire
- Literary movement: Baroque; Marinism

Bartolomeo Dotti (Italian: [bartoloˈmɛːo ˈdotti]; 1651 – 7 November 1713) was an Italian satirical poet and adventurer of the Baroque age.

== Biography ==
Born in Brescia in 1651, Dotti led a turbulent life. He showed a literary inclination from an early age and devoted himself to the study of the Greek and Latin classics, especially Horace, Persius and Juvenal. Accused by the Venetian authorities of complicity in an assassination attempt, he fled to Milan, but he was imprisoned in 1685 in the fortress of Tortona. There he penned his self-defence, much praised at the time. In 1692 he managed to escape from prison and fled to Venice. Soon after, he enrolled in the Venetian army and he distinguished himself in the Morean War, earning a reprieve from his exile. But his troubles pursued him, and he was mysteriously assassinated in Venice on 7 November 1713.

== Works ==
His literary work includes Rime ("Rhymes") and Sonetti ("Sonnets"), published in 1689, and were subdivided like Giambattista Marino’s lyrics into the encomiastic, descriptive, and erotic. Dotti does not develop Marino’s insistence on nature and the senses; instead he strikes a more moralistic tone that has its roots in a Lombard poetic tradition later to flourish in the poetry of Giuseppe Parini and Vittorio Alfieri. He is most famous for his Satire, published posthumously in Paris n 1757, in which he rails against Venetian hypocrisy in a popular and semi-dialectal Italian. His satire is personal and Dotti frequently alludes to real persons, using their real names. Many of his lyrics are included in Benedetto Croce's influential anthology of Baroque poetry (Lirici marinisti, Bari, 1910).

== Bibliography ==
- Diffley, P. (2002). "Dotti, Bartolomeo". The Oxford Companion to Italian Literature. Oxford University Press. ISBN 978-0-19-818332-7.
- Levi, Ercole (1896). "Un poeta satirico: Bartolomeo Dotti". Nuovo Archivio Veneto. XII: 5–77.
- Filippini, Enrico (1906). "Una miscellanea poetica del secolo XVIII contenente parecchie satire di Bartolomeo Dotti". Rassegna della Letteratura Italiana. XIV: 326–339.
- Vovelle-Guidi, Claire (1994). "Démȇlés et pérégrinations d'un vénitien en marge à travers six lettres inédites de Bartolomeo Dotti". Cahiers d'études romanes. XVIII: 211–237.
- Vovelle-Guidi, Claire (1995). "Il fascino discreto della nobiltà. Bartolomeo Dotti tra esilio e compromesso". Trimestre. XXVIII (1–4): 157–219.
- Vovelle-Guidi, Claire (1997). "«Una vita adattata al romanzo»: Bartolomeo Dotti, poeta satirico". Quaderni Veneti. XXVI: 51–93.
- Boggione, Valter (1997). «Poi che tutto corre al nulla». Le Rime di Bartolomeo Dotti. Turin: Res.
- Vovelle-Guidi, Claire (1998). "Un regard sur la société vénitienne: Bartolomeo Dotti, un devancier de Goldoni?". La Venise de Goldoni, Actes du colloque en Aix-en-Provence (1-3 décembre 1993). Aix-en-Provence: Université de Provence: 281–294.
- Barberi Squarotti, Giorgio (2001). "Bartolomeo Dotti: l'arte del sonetto morale". Rivista di letteratura italiana. XIX (1): 79–104.
- Boggione, Valter (2002). "Dotti, Testi e l'idea della letteratura". Levia Gravia. IV: 181–192.
- Pellegrino, Angelo (2016). "DOTTI, Bartolomeo". Dizionario Biografico degli Italiani (in Italian). Vol. 85: Ponzone–Quercia. Rome: Istituto dell'Enciclopedia Italiana. pp. 523–524. ISBN 978-88-12-00032-6.
