= Cesare Orsini =

Italian poet and writer

- Born: 1572; Ponzano in Val di Magra, Republic of Genoa
- Died: c. 1640
- Occupations: Poet; intellectual; writer
- Writing career
- Pen name: Magister Stopinus
- Language: Latin; Italian
- Period: 17th century; Baroque
- Genres: Poetry
- Literary movement: Baroque; Marinism

Cesare Orsini (Latin: Cæsar Ursinus; 1572 – c. 1640) was an Italian Baroque poet. He is the best known macaronic Latin poet after Teofilo Folengo.

== Biography ==
Cesare Orsini was born in Ponzano in Val di Magra, in the Republic of Genoa, in 1572. He lost his parents at a young age and was raised and educated by his uncle Francesco Baldassarri, a learned cleric.

In his twenties, he left his native country in search of fortune and traveled among the courts of northern Italy, serving as secretary to several nobles and prelates. After a short stay at the Gonzaga court in Mantua, he was for about twenty years at the service of the Venetian patrician Marcantonio Memmo, whom he followed in Brescia when Memmo was appointed podestà of the city in 1601.

In 1612, Orsini moved to Ferrara, where he served as secretary to Cardinal Bonifazio Bevilacqua. After the death of Bevilacqua in 1627, Orsini moved to Padua, where he published his Capriccia macaronica in 1636. He died shortly after 1638.

== Works ==
Orsini composed three collections of love verses in Italian. Later in his life he turned to macaronic poetry. His macaronic compositions are gathered in the collection Capriccia macaronica, first published in Padua in 1636.

The Capriccia was published under the pseudonym Magister Stopinus. It was composed following the example of the works of Merlin Cocai. In his satirical introduction Orsini tells us that as the Muses were unwilling to receive him upon Parnassus, he traveled to the court of Bacchus in the land of Cockaigne, where he was welcomed by the Macaronic Muses, who gave him the name of Magister Stopinus. Under this assumed name he satirized some of the prevalent vices of the time by means of ironic praise. The collection consists of eight macaroneae, twelve elegies, one eclogue and several epigrams.

The macaroneae have a paradoxical character, following the Baroque tradition: five consist in the praise respectively of the art of stealing, of ignorance, of madness, of lies and of ambition; another deals bitterly with the tricks of whores; the final is a funeral lamentation for a pink cat killed by a soldier, and a lamentation for the gout that afflicted the author. Orsini's poems display considerable satiric talent and humor and were particularly popular in the 17th and 18th centuries. They were praised by French critic Charles Nodier, according to whom, "si Folengo est l'Homère de la poésie macaronique, César Ursinus en fut, plus de cent ans après, le Virgile. Ce fut un des esprits les plus brillants et les plus excentriques du XVII^{e} siècle." (transl. "If Folengo is the Homer of Macaronic poetry, Caesar Ursinus was, more than a hundred years later, its Virgil. He was one of the most brilliant and eccentric minds of the 17th century.")

== Editions ==
- Magistri Stopini Poetæ Ponzanensis Capriccia Macaronica. Padua: Gasparo Ganassa. 1636.
- Magistri Stopini Poetæ Ponzanensis Capriccia Macaronica cum Nova Appendice. Venice. 1653. This edition, which is considered the best, contains the following pieces: I. De Malitiis Putanarum. II. Laudes de Arte Robbandi. III. De Laudibus Ignorantiæ. IV. De Laudibus Pazziæ. V. De Laudibus Bosiæ. VI. De Laudibus Ambitionis. VII. Gattam Rosam a milite interfectam deplorat. VIII. Lamentatio de Podagra, et Chiragra. IX. Contentio Trium Poetarum Nizzus, Bertoldus, et Drias. X. Epigramata. XI. Elegiarum Liber. XII. Appendix.

== Bibliography ==
- Delepierre, Octave (1852). Macaronéana, ou Mélanges de littérature macaronique des différents peuples de l'Europe. Paris: G. Gancia. pp. 116–117.
- Boffito, Giuseppe (1898). "D'un imitatore del Cocai nel Seicento. Maestro Stopino (Cesare Orsini)". Giornale Storico della Letteratura Italiana. XVI: 331–342.
- Allodoli, Ettore (1957). "Orsini, Cesare". Dizionario Letterario Bompiani. Autori. Vol. III. Milan: Bompiani. p. 27.
- Pignatti, Franco (2013). "ORSINI, Cesare". Dizionario Biografico degli Italiani (in Italian). Vol. 79: Nursio–Ottolini Visconti. Rome: Istituto dell'Enciclopedia Italiana. ISBN 978-88-12-00032-6.
