= Giovan Francesco Maia Materdona =

Italian poet and priest (1590 – c. 1650)

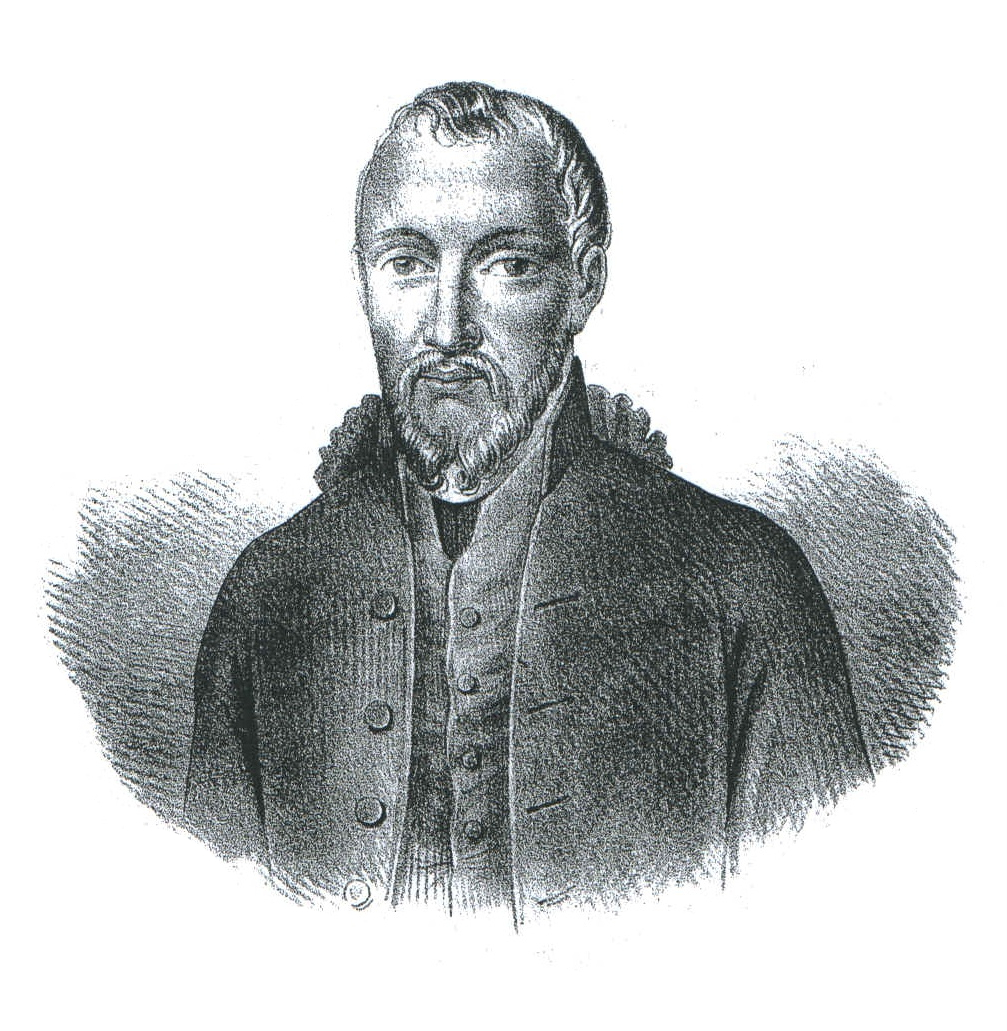
- Giovan Francesco Maia Materdona
- Born: 4 September 1590; Mesagne, Kingdom of Naples
- Died: c. 1650; Rome, Papal States
- Education: University of Naples Federico II
- Occupations: Poet; Catholic priest; Writer
- Parent(s): Pomponio Maia and Ippolita Materdona
- Writing career
- Language: Latin, Italian
- Literary movement: Baroque; Marinism

Giovan Francesco Maia Materdona (4 September 1590 – c. 1650) was an Italian Baroque poet and Roman Catholic priest.

== Biography ==
Giovan Francesco Maia Materdona was a native of Mesagne in the Terra di Otranto, near Brindisi. He graduated in law from the University of Naples in the early 1600s. He attended the Accademia degli Oziosi in Naples through his acquaintance with its founder Giovanni Battista Manso. In 1621 he moved to Rome where he was admitted to the Accademia degli Umoristi. Maia Materdona is considered one of the most original of the early followers of Giambattista Marino. His poetry is characterized by the use of complex metaphors, hyperboles, and conceits. He published most of his works between 1624 and 1629. His Rime, published at Venice in 1629, went through several reprints. In 1638, he was ordained a priest. After ordination to the priesthood he devoted himself to religious poetry. In 1644, he published the Latin poem Ad beatissimam Matrem Virginem canticum rhythmicum. He also published a devotional treatise, L'utile spavento del peccatore, overo la Penitenza sollecita (1649), which was highly successful, and went through several editions. He died in Rome shortly after 1649. 24 of his lyrics are included in Benedetto Croce's influential anthology of Baroque poetry.

== Works ==
- Gino Rizzo, ed. (1989). Opere. Lecce: Milella. ISBN 9788870481754.

== Bibliography ==
- Slawinski, M. (2002). "Maia Materdona, Gian Francesco". The Oxford Companion to Italian Literature. Oxford University Press.
- Russo, Emilio (2006). "Maia Materdona, Gianfrancesco". Dizionario Biografico degli Italiani (in Italian). Vol. 67: Macchi–Malaspina. Rome: Istituto dell'Enciclopedia Italiana. ISBN 978-88-12-00032-6.
- De Nunzio-Schilardi, Wanda (1973–74). "La "Vita" di Gianfrancesco Maia Materdona nell'inedito di Ortensio De Leo". Annali della facoltà di magistero dell'Università di Bari. XIII: 87–116.
- Forni, Giorgio (2013). "«Per gareggiar con Crisostomo e con Bernardo». L'Utile spavento del peccatore di Gian Francesco Maia Materdona". Prediche e Predicatori Nel Seicento. Bologna: il Mulino: 77–109. ISBN 978-8815246974.
