= Bartolomeo Tortoletti =

16th/17th-century Italian poet and writer

- Born: 1560; Verona, Republic of Venice
- Died: 1648 (aged 87–88); Rome, Papal States
- Other names: Filone Romano; Negletto
- Occupations: Poet; Intellectual
- Writing career
- Language: Italian, Latin
- Notable works: Agrippina la maggiore Il Tarquinio; Iuditha vindex e vindicata

Bartolomeo Tortoletti (1560–1648) was an Italian Baroque poet and writer.

== Life ==
Bartolomeo Tortoletti was born in Verona in 1560. His parents’ names are not known. After obtaining his doctorate in theology, he settled permanently in Rome, where he became a member of the Accademia degli Umoristi.

Until 1641 Tortoletti worked as secretary to Cardinal Carlo Emanuele Pio di Savoia. His links with the House of Savoy are also testified by the eulogy he delivered in 1624 upon Emmanuel Philibert's death (In obitu serenissimi principis Philiberti de Sabaudia, Romae 1624).

His most fertile period of literary activity occurred during the reign of Urban VIII. Member of the circle of Barberini's proteges, he enjoyed Papal favour and became a close friend of some of the major intellectual personalities of the time, such as Gabriel Naudè and Daniël Heinsius.

Tortoletti died in Rome in 1648. He wrote a Latin tragedy in five acts, Agrippina major, but he is best known for an epic on the Biblical character of Judith (Bartholomaei Tortoletti Iuditha vindex e vindicata, 1628). He also wrote in Italian the tragedies Gionata (1624), Il giuramento o'vero Il Battista santo, and La scena reale (1645), as well as Rime (1645). Leo Allatius' Apes Urbanæ contains a complete catalogue of all the published and unpublished works of Tortoletti.

== Main works ==
- Ossuniana conjuratio qua Petrus Ossunae regnum neapolitanum sibi desponderat (Venice, 1623 quarto);
- Iuditha Vindex et Vindicata. An epic poem with erudite commentary, it was first issued in Latin in 1628 by the Vatican press and again in 1648 in an expanded Italian edition, Giuditta Vittoriosa; both were lavishly illustrated.
- Academia Pompeiana, seu defensio magni Pompeii in administratione belli civilis, a series of erudite debates with Alessandro Guarini (Rome, 1639, octavo).

== Editions ==
- Bartolomeo Tortoletti (2017). Agrippina la maggiore. Biblioteca barocca. Argo. ISBN 978-88-8234-217-3.
