= Girolamo Fontanella =

Italian Baroque poet (c. 1612–c. 1644)

- Born: c. 1612; Reggio Emilia, Papal States
- Died: c. 1644 (aged 31–32); Naples, Kingdom of Naples
- Occupations: Poet; Writer
- Writing career
- Language: Italian
- Literary movement: Baroque; Marinism

Girolamo Fontanella (Italian: [dʒiˈrɔːlamo fontaˈnɛlla]; c. 1612 – c. 1644) was an Italian Baroque poet.

== Biography ==
Little is known of Girolamo Fontanella's short but active life until 1632, when his first book, L'Incendio rinovato del Vesuvio was printed in Naples. He was born probably in Reggio Emilia around 1612, but he spent most of his life in Naples. He was a member of the Accademia degli Oziosi, and worked as poet for the Viceregal Court, as suggested by his sonnet dedicated to Fernando Afán de Ribera, Spanish ambassador to the Holy See from 1625 to 1626 and future Viceroy of Naples and Sicily. Fontanella was a friend of the painter Artemisia Gentileschi, to whom he dedicated various poems. He died in Naples between March 1643 and April 1644.

== Works ==
Fontanella is considered one of the best writers of pastoral verse of the 17th century. Of all the Marinists he is the most original in his imagery and the most persistent in his search for new directions. His poems appeared in 3 volumes – Ode (1638), Nove cieli (1640) and Elegie (1645). His poetry collection Ode (1633; second edition, revised and expanded, 1638) is influenced both by the conceptismo of Giambattista Marino and Guido Casoni and by the neoclassic poetry of Gabriello Chiabrera and Fulvio Testi. His Nove cieli (1640), regarded by Benedetto Croce as akin to D'Annunzio's Laudi, uses the conventions of conceptismo to create graceful miniature portraits, frequently incorporating moral dicta, while the Elegie (1645) turn to declamatory pathos. Fontanella's verse is emotionally slight, but pictorially lively. Colours, shapes and movements he conveys in a dynamic language rich in striking imagery, with a penchant for the slightly exotic: the carnation, the glow-worm, coral, a beautiful girl swimming. Many of his lyrics are included in Benedetto Croce's influential anthology of Baroque poetry.

== Bibliography ==
- Contarino, Rosario (1997). "FONTANELLA, Girolamo". Dizionario Biografico degli Italiani (in Italian). Vol. 48: Filoni–Forghieri. Rome: Istituto dell'Enciclopedia Italiana. ISBN 978-88-12-00032-6.
- Slawinski, M. (2002). "Fontanella, Girolamo". The Oxford Companion to Italian Literature. Oxford University Press.
- De Lorenzo, Pierandrea (2008). "I Nove cieli di Girolamo Fontanella: Considerazioni sulla struttura del canzoniere". Il Nuovo Canzoniere. Esperimenti Lirici Secenteschi. Rome: Bulzoni. pp. 127–185. doi:10.1400/168089.
- Catelli, Nicola (2014). "L'invisibile compasso. Osservazioni sulla "dispositio" delle "Ode" di Girolamo Fontanella (1638)". Annali della Scuola Normale Superiore di Pisa. Classe di Lettere e Filosofia. 5. 6 (2): 811–843. JSTOR 43915814.
- Palmisciano, Vincenzo (2015). "Un ritrovamento per Domenico Basile e due per Girolamo Fontanella". Studi secenteschi. LVI: 417–420.
