= Francesco Della Valle =

Italian physician (born in 1858)

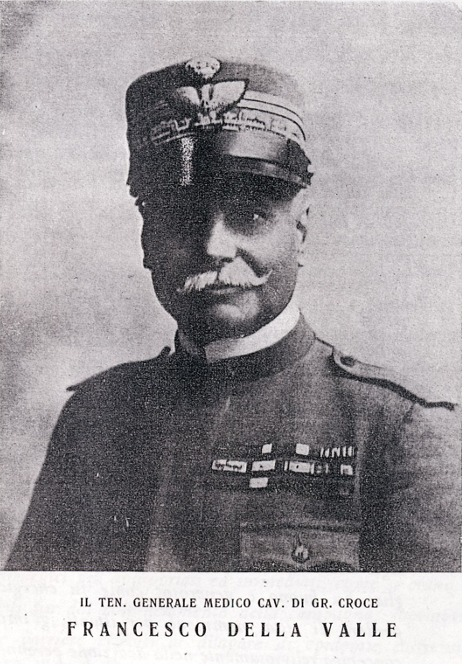
Francesco Della Valle from the Journal of Military Medicine

Francesco Della Valle (2 February 1858 in Puccianiello-Caserta – 27 July 1937) was an Italian physician and general who served as General Director of Military Health from 1920 to 1925.

== Life ==
=== Military career ===
After graduating in 1883, Della Valle joined the Military Health Service and in 1888, when he was a young lieutenant, he was assigned to the Ministry of War. Della Valle spent much of his career in the corps, acquiring extensive skills in the organization of the Royal Army's health system and preventive medicine among the troops.

=== Beginning of the War period ===
At the outbreak of the First World War, Della Valle was in charge of the Military Health Office of the Supreme Mobilized Command as a medical colonel, from where he led the effort to keep up with the dramatic daily increase in the needs of the forces at the front. According to him:

it was a matter of coordinating and directing the entire medical resources of the country for the war, of utilizing men and things as much as possible for the proper execution of the service, with sufficient guarantees of breadth and technical capacity.

From mid 1915, Della Valle was a member of the Vigilance Commission set up by the General Intendency of the Supreme Command for "the need to activate and integrate the prophylactic services", facilitating interaction between civil and military health authorities in the fight against infectious diseases in war zones. This interaction often resulted in so much difficulty Della Valle said; "it must be considered that no service was as much in contrast with the action of the Command as the health service because of its tyrannical requirements for war". He acknowledging the impossibility of making accurate diagnoses of unconfirmed types of tuberculosis during the expeditious medical examinations for recruitment.

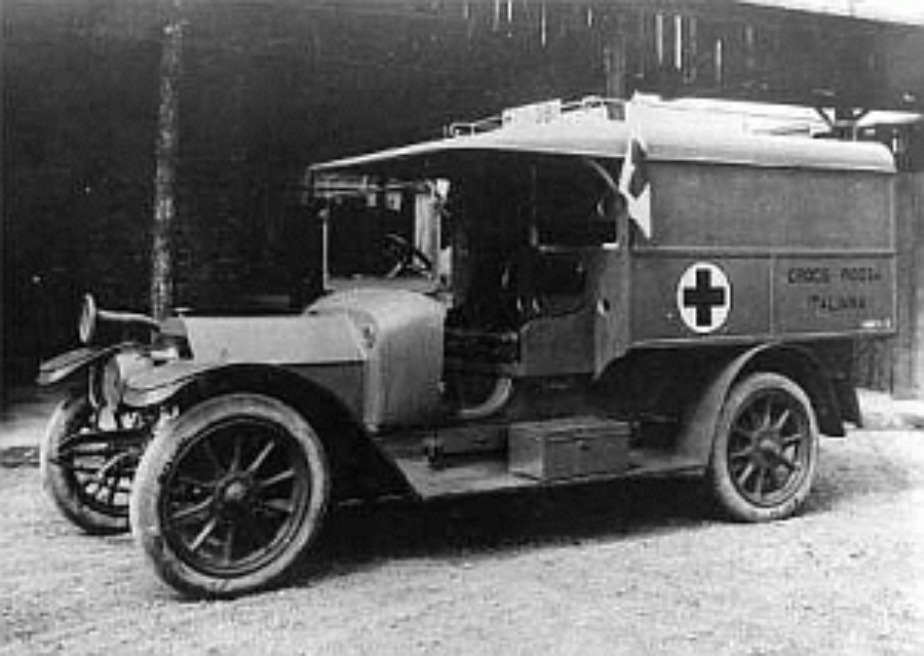
A surgical ambulance of the Army

=== War Period ===
On 9 September 1917, Francesco Della Valle was promoted to Major General for his outstanding merits. The Italian military medical system, under his coordination, "had to manage the transport, care and hospitalization of over two and a half million wounded and sick people, making use of the Military Health Corps and the Italian Red Cross apparatus (medical personnel and 'Dames of the Red Cross') assisted by voluntary nurses from welfare committees such as those of the Knights of Malta, the Order of Saints Maurice and Lazarus and the Jesuits" In 41 months of the war. In his role, Della Valle contributed to the development of the health chain for the triage and sorting of the wounded from the battlefront to the most-suitable hospitals of different capacities, to the introduction of surgical ambulances—mobile operating rooms of the army run by highly trained doctors, that were equipped with several tents and vehicles—to the interaction between the military and civilian health systems, and to the establishment of the Università Castrense in San Giorgio di Nogaro (UD) for the emergency training of a large number of military doctors needed to assist the wounded.

During the war period, in addition to the recalled organizational and innovative action, Francesco Della Valle contributed to encouraging the establishment of consultancies or specialized sections in military hospitals in the war zone, trying to overcome the vision of war medicine as capables à tout faire. He paid particular attention to the containment of castrensi epidemics and, more generally, to the problem of infectious diseases on the front line that would inevitably affect civil society and territorial public health.

Della Valle was active in fighting the cholera epidemic of the First World War; he was awarded the silver medal for public health merits in 1916; and in the use of hospitals and convalescence warehouses for the isolation of sick people suffering from or suspected of carrying infectious diseases despite considerable difficulties related to the frequent clearing of health facilities due to the needs of operations in war zones. In 1917, he introduced typhoid vaccinations for mobilized troops.

=== Post-war period ===
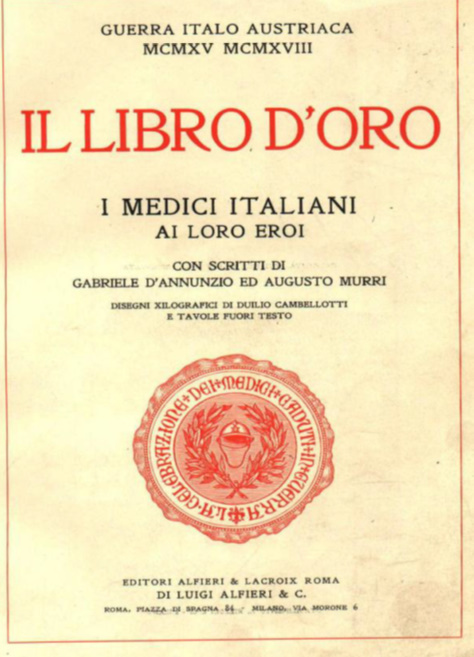
Libro d'oro. I medici italiani ai loro eroi

From 1920 to 1925, once Della Valle was promoted to lieutenant general, he headed the newly established General Directorate of Military Health promoting the reorganization of the Army's health system that emerged from the Great War. In this role position, Della Valle organized and chaired the 2nd International Congress of Military Medicine and Pharmacy in Rome in 1923, gaining an appreciation for the preparation of the event, and the quantity and quality of the scientific papers presented.

It was an emblematic review of how the war had pushed medicine to improve and experiment, intervention techniques, hygiene and organizational practices and vaccination practices. From 1920, Della Valle was an ordinary academician of the Royal Medical Academy of Rome, and from 1923 he was also the honorary president of the Permanent International Military Health Committee.

Della Valle paid attention and care, especially during and after the war, to bear witness to the activity and sacrifice of military doctors, career and complementary officers, and health assistants who died, were wounded and disabled in the war, including diseases contracted during military service. In the years following the end of the war, he was also the president of the Committee for the celebration of doctors who died in the war; in this position, Della Valle promoted and followed, entrusting the coordination to the Medical Captain Federico Bocchetti – a two-year project for the collection of documents and testimonies, which in 1924 resulted in the publication of the 'Libro d'oro. I medici italiani ai loro eroi'.

The last institutional position fulfilled by Francesco Della Valle was that of the president of the Superior Commission for War Pensions, which he held until 1 February 1933.

== Honors and awards ==
- War Merit Cross
- Grand Officer of the Order of Saints Maurice and Lazarus
- Knight of the Grand Cross of the Order of the Crown of Italy
- Commemorative medal of the Italo-Austrian War (1915-1918)
- Silver Medal for public health merits
- Maurician Medal of merit for fifty years of military career
- Magistral Knight of the Sovereign Military Order of Malta

=== Gallery ===
War Merit Cross

Grand Officer of the Order of Saints Maurice and Lazarus

Mauritian Medal of merit for fifty years of military career

Knight of the Grand Cross of the Order of the Crown of Italy

Commemorative medal of the Italo-Austrian War

Silver Medal for public health merits UP

Magistral Knight of the Sovereign Military Order of Malta

== Bibliography ==
- Boschi G., La guerra e le arti sanitarie, Milano, Mondadori, pp. 160, 166-167, 175-176.
- De Napoli D., La Sanità Militare in Italia durante la I Guerra Mondiale, Roma, editrice APES, pp. 70,78.
- Donelli G. e Di Carlo V., La sanità pubblica italiana negli anni a cavallo della Prima Guerra Mondiale, Roma, Armando editore, pp. 198–199.
- Formigine A. F., Chi è – Dizionario degli italiani d'oggi, https://catalog.hathitrust.org/Record/000528002, Roma, Formigine editore, 1936, p. 305.
- Galasso M., https://www.difesa.it/GiornaleMedicina/Pagine/LaSanitaMilitareNellaGrandeGuerra.aspx, 24 May 2015.
- Marmo F., Vincenzo Iura: l'uomo, il soldato, il medico, (La sanità Militare durante la Prima Guerra Mondiale), https://www.difesa.it/GiornaleMedicina/Pagine/PremioVincenzoIURA.aspx, 2013, p. 16.
- Relazioni del secondo Congresso Internazionale di Medicina e Farmacia militari, in Giornale di Medicina Militare, 1923, pp. 241–386.
- Tenente Generale Medico Francesco Della Valle, Giornale di Medicina Militare, 1937, pp. 684–688.
- Urbino F.G. e Urbino P., La sanità Militare nella Grande Guerra, in Relazione al XXXIX Congresso Nazionale della Società Italiana di Storia della Medicina, Firenze, 14 giugno 1998.
