= Giacomo Lubrano =

Italian Baroque poet (1619–1693)

- Born: 12 September 1619; Naples, Kingdom of Naples
- Died: October 1693 (aged 74); Naples, Kingdom of Naples
- Occupations: Jesuit; Poet; Preacher
- Writing career
- Language: Latin; Italian
- Period: 17th century; Baroque literature
- Genres: Poetry
- Notable work: Scintille poetiche
- Literary movement: Baroque; Marinism

Giacomo Lubrano SJ (12 September 1619 – October 1693) was an Italian Jesuit, Marinist poet and preacher.

== Biography ==
Giacomo Lubrano was born in Naples in 1619. He entered the Society of Jesus on 30 April 1635, at the age of fifteen. Apart from a two-year absence from his native city between 1658 and 1660, and his many preaching commitments in other Italian regions (he received invitations to deliver sermons in Rome, Palermo, Venice, and even Malta), he spent most of his life in and around Naples. Late in life, he was affected by a partial paralysis of the tongue. He died in Naples in 1693.

== Works ==
Lubrano was widely known during his lifetime as a preacher and poet. He preached before Pope Clement X in November 1670, and in 1671 gave a sermon at the celebration of the canonisation of St. Francis Borgia in the Church of the Gesù in Rome. Giambattista Vico, who cultivated poetry in his youth, called upon him for an opinion of his progress in poetry and submitted for his correction a canzone on the rose.

His copious production in Italian and Latin includes two collections of sacred and moral verse, Scintille poetiche (Poetic Sparks, 1674) and Suaviludia musarum ad Sebethi ripam (1690), as well as homilies, letters, and orations.

Lubrano's collection of Italian poems was published with the title of Scintille poetiche in 1690 and 1692 under the pseudonym of Paolo Brinacio. Both chronologically and stylistically, his Italian poetry represents one of the most extreme instances of late Neapolitan conceptismo. His wide range includes many moral and religious themes, with typically spectacular displays of stylistic pyrotechnics. He is most effective in the descriptive bravura of brief vignettes, where esoteric subject, bizarre verbal juxtapositions and audaciously dramatic imagery produce an exciting vision of a brilliant, moving world impinging on the senses.

Lubrano's poetic style was severely criticized by many of his contemporaries, especially his compatriots Nicola Capasso and Francesco Maria Casini. Despite his orthodoxy and piety, Lubrano was subject to criticism from within the Church itself by those who deplored the conceited and hyperbolic style of some religious writers and preachers of the day. His poetry was mocked as absurd for over two centuries, and has been reappraised only recently for those same extreme conceptismo which previously caused it to be dismissed. Many of his lyrics are included in Benedetto Croce's influential anthology of Baroque poetry (Lirici marinisti, Bari, 1910).

In his poetry, Lubrano expresses a troubled if deep faith and a view of the natural world more akin to that of Lucretius or Heraclitus than to the philosophy of Nature endorsed by Jesuit authorities of his day. In philosophy he supports Neoplatonism and opposes the subtleties of late Baroque Scholastic Aristotelianism.

== Bibliography ==
- Croce, Franco (1966). Tre momenti del Barocco letterario italiano. Florence. pp. 268–322.
- Pieretti, Piero E. (1969). "Testi inediti di Giacomo Lubrano". Studi secenteschi. X: 289–300.
- Sensi, Claudio (1976). "Giacomo Lubrano: contributi per una biografia". Italianistica. V (2): 238–259.
- Ortesta, Cosimo (1977). "Giacomo Lubrano: il tempo del verme". Paragone. 326: 18–27.
- Sensi, Claudio (1978). "Cultura barocca tra consenso e polemica: gli epigrammi latini di Giacomo Lubrano". Esperienze Letterarie. III (2): 31–54.
- Pieri, Marzio (1980). "Ritratto del Brinacio, ovvero: Le tentazioni di Padre Lubrano". Paragone. 366: 38–57.
- Sensi, Claudio (1982). "Gli emblemi dell'inconsistenza e l'«arcimondo» della fantasia". Lettere Italiane. 34 (2): 176–214. JSTOR 26260702.
- Kelly, Denzil (1996). "The Apex of the Poetics of Confidence and Orthodoxy: Heroes of the Church in the Odes and Sonnets of Giacomo Lubrano". Altro Polo. 12: Italian Studies in Honour of Frederick May: 125–143.
- Slawinski, M. (2002). Hainsworth, Peter; Robey, David (eds.). "Lubrano, Giacomo". The Oxford Companion to Italian Literature. Oxford University Press. doi:10.1093/acref/9780198183327.001.0001. ISBN 978-0-19-818332-7.
- Matt, Luigi (2006). "LUBRANO, Giacomo". Dizionario Biografico degli Italiani (in Italian). Vol. 66: Lorenzetto–Macchetti. Rome: Istituto dell'Enciclopedia Italiana. ISBN 978-88-12-00032-6.
- Izzi, Pierangela (2018). "Le Scintille poetiche di Giacomo Lubrano tra marinismo e cultismo". Esperienze letterarie. XLIII (4): 27–42. doi:10.19272/201807904002.
- Argurio, Silvia (2020). "Per un'edizione commentata delle Scintille poetiche di Giacomo Lubrano". Lettere Italiane. 3.
