= Nicola Villani =

Italian Baroque poet and literary critic (1590–1636)

- Born: 1590; Pistoia, Grand Duchy of Tuscany
- Died: 2 October 1636 (aged 45–46); Rome, Papal States
- Occupations: Poet; Literary critic; Writer
- Parent(s): Ottavio Villani and Giulia Villani (née Baldovini)
- Writing career
- Pen name: Aldeano
- Language: Italian; Latin; Greek
- Notable works: Ragionamento sopra la poesia giocosa de' Greci, de' Latini e de' Toscani; Della Fiorenza difesa
- Literary movement: Baroque; Classicism

Nicola (or Niccolò) Villani (1590 – 2 October 1636) was an Italian literary critic and Baroque poet.

== Biography ==
Nicola Villani was born in Pistoia in 1590, of a noble family. The famous Medieval chronicler Giovanni Villani was among his ancestors. He studied in Florence, Siena and Pisa, then entered the service of Cardinal Tiberio Muti in Rome. He became a member of the Accademia degli Umoristi under the pseudonym Aldeano. After a journey to Greece, he took up residence in Venice. Around 1630, he returned to Rome, where he died in 1636.

== Works ==
Nicola Villani is best known for his critical writings, in which he defended Giambattista Marino against the attacks of Tommaso Stigliani. Villani took up a moderate position in the Quarrel of the Ancients and the Moderns that developed in Italy in the second and third decades of the 17th century. While he ranked Marino above Dante and Petrarch, he considered Homer and Virgil superior to all modern poets. Villani's Fiorenza difesa (Florence Defended), a regular, neoclassic epic inspired by Trissino and Chiabrera, was left incomplete at his death and published posthumously in 1641. In 1634 Villani published the Ragionamento sopra la poesia giocosa de' Greci, de' Latini e de' Toscani, a detailed study on the comic poetry of the ancients. Villani was one of the foremost Dante scholars of his generation. He was a successful writer of Latin satires and Italian facetious compositions, highly appreciated during the 17th and 18th centuries.

== List of works ==
- De laudibus Gregorii XV Pont. ter Max. Carmen. Viterbii: apud eundem. 1621.
- Ad Nicolaum Ludovisium, Venusii principem, Isabellae Gesualdae sponsae epistola. Romae: apud Alexandrum Zannettum. 1622.
- Poesie sopra Venetia. In Venetia: appresso Antonio Pinelli. 1628.
- Ad Bonam Frugem, poematium ad Dominicum Molinum. Venetiis: apud Antonium Pinellum. 1629.
- L'Uccellatura di Vincenzo Foresi all'Occhiale del Cav. Fra Tomaso Stigliani contro l'Adone del Cav. Battista Marini, e alla Difesa di Girolamo Aleandro. In Venetia: presso Antonio Pinelli. 1630.
- Considerationi di Messer Fagiano sopra la seconda parte dell'Occhiale del Cav. Stigliano contro allo Adone del Cav. Marino; e sopra la Seconda Difesa di Girolamo Aleandro. In Venetia: presso Gio. Pietro Pinelli. 1631.
- Canzone alla Santita di N. S. Urbano VIII. Venetia: presso Gio. Pietro Pinelli. 1632.
- Ragionamento dello Academico Aldeano sopra la poesia giocosa de' Greci, de' Latini, e de' Toscani [Argument of the Academician Aldeano on the Playful Poetry of the Greeks, the Latins, and the Tuscans]. In Venetia: appresso Gio. Pietro Pinelli. 1634.
- Della Fiorenza difesa poema eroico, canti dieci. In Roma: appresso Antonio Landini. 1641.
- Umberto Cosmo, ed. (1894). Le osservazioni alla divina commedia di Dante Alighieri. Lapi: Città di Castello.

== Bibliography ==
- Tavani, Giuseppe (1976). Dante nel Seicento. Saggi su A. Guarini, N. Villani, L. Magalotti. Florence: Leo S. Olschki Editore. ISBN 978-8-82-222217-6.
- Accame Bobbio, Aurelia (1970). "Villani, Nicola". Enciclopedia Dantesca. Istituto dell'Enciclopedia Italiana.
- Diffley, P. (2002). "Villani, Niccola (or Niccolò)". The Oxford Companion to Italian Literature. Oxford University Press. ISBN 978-0-19-818332-7.
- Leone, Marco (2020). "VILLANI, Nicola". Dizionario Biografico degli Italiani (in Italian). Vol. 99: Verrazzano–Vittorio Amedeo. Rome: Istituto dell'Enciclopedia Italiana. ISBN 978-88-12-00032-6.
- Villani, Nicola entry (in Italian) in the Enciclopedia Treccani
