= Paganino Gaudenzio =

Swiss Renaissance scholar

- Born: 3 June 1595; Poschiavo, Three Leagues
- Died: 3 January 1649 (aged 53); Pisa, Grand Duchy of Tuscany
- Occupations: University teacher; Theologian; Scholar
- Father: Tommaso Gaudenzio

Academic background
- Education: University of Tübingen

Academic work
- Discipline: Christian theology, Classics
- Institutions: Sapienza University of Rome; University of Pisa

Paganino Gaudenzio or Gaudenzi (3 June 1595 – 3 January 1649) was a Swiss philosopher and Catholic theologian of the Renaissance.

== Biography ==
Born on 3 June 1595 in Poschiavo (Grisons), which was the main urban center in northeastern Valtellina. He enrolled at the University of Basel on 29 May 1612. He attended the Universities of Basel, Regensburg and Tübingen, where he graduated with a doctorate in law and theology. He was pastor in Mese and in his native Poschiavo. In 1616 he converted to Catholicism: for this reason he was imprisoned in Chiavenna in June 1617. He then went to Rome, and received a pension from the Pope. In 1625 he was appointed professor of Greek at the Sapienza University of Rome. In 1628 he was appointed Professor of humanities at the University of Pisa. He held this office until his death. He died in Pisa on 3 January 1649. A prolific author, he wrote nearly forty volumes both in Latin and Italian. He corresponded with important cultural personalities of his time, including Alessandro Tassoni, Gabriello Chiabrera, Giovanni Battista Doni and Francesco Sforza Pallavicino.

== Works ==
- De incertitudine doctrinae calvinianae tractatus. Rome: Facciotti. 1623.
- De Dogmatibus et ritibus veteris Ecclesiase haereticorum huius teporis, et praesertim Calvinianorum testimonia. Rome: Corbelletti. 1625.
- Paganini Gaudentii Declamationes octo: extra ordinem habitae anno MDCXXIX. Florence: apud S. Ciottum. 1630.
- In obitum sereniss.mæ reginæ Polonorum ode. Florence: ex officina Petri Nestij sub signo Solis. 1631.
- Contradizzione morale intorno al sospetto. Discorso di Paganino Gaudenzio, indrizzato al molt'illustre, e molt'eccellente sig.re il sig. Gio. Stefano Litta. Dottor di collegio, e gentilhuomo milanese. Pisa: nella stamperia di Francesco Tanagli. 1634.
- De Justinianaei saeculi moribus nonnullis. Florence. 1637.
- Multa mulctrae, apologeticon tyronis litterarii. Florence: Massa. 1638.
- De dogmatum Origenis cum philosophia Platonis comparatione, Salebrae Tertullianeae. De vita Christianorum ante tempora Constantini. Florence: typis nouis Amatoris Massae, & Soc. 1639.
- De Pythagorea animarum transmigratione. Pisa. 1641.
- Della Disunita Accademia accrescimento, operetta di Paganino Gaudentio, nella quale l'autore insieme difende alcuni istorici contra l'accuse d'Agostino Mascardi. Pisa: nella stamperia d'Amor Massi, e Lorenzo Landi. 1644.
- La Galleria dell'inclito Marino considerata vien dal Paganino con alcune composizioni dell'istesso Paganino. Pisa: per Ferdinando Chelli, e Francesco Stefanelli. 1648.

== Bibliography ==
This article incorporates public domain material from McClintock, John; Strong, James (1867–1887). Cyclopædia of Biblical, Theological and Ecclesiastical Literature. Harper and Brothers.

- Vieli, Franceso Dante (1936). "Un poeta laureato del Seicento: Paganino Gaudenzi di Poschiavo". Scrittori della Svizzera Italiana. I. Bellinzona: 537–541.
- Esposito, Enzo (1970). "Gaudenzio, Paganino". Enciclopedia Dantesca. Istituto dell'Enciclopedia Italiana.
- Ronza, Maria Cara (1994). "Il 'candore politico' di Paganino Gaudenzi". Cheiron. 11 (22): 125–147.
- Brunelli, Giampiero (1999). "GAUDENZI, Paganino". Dizionario Biografico degli Italiani (in Italian). Vol. 52: Gambacorta–Gelasio 2. Rome: Istituto dell'Enciclopedia Italiana. ISBN 978-88-12-00032-6.
- Negroni, Francesca (2007). "Gaudenzi, Paganino". Dizionario storico della Svizzera (DSS).
- Del Soldato, Eva (2022). "Between Past and Present: Paganino Gaudenzi (1595–1649) and the Comparatio Tradition". Harmony and Contrast: Plato and Aristotle in the Early Modern Period. Oxford University Press. pp. 172–188. doi:10.5871/bacad/9780197267295.003.0009. ISBN 978-0-19-726729-5.
