= Agostino Mascardi =

Italian rhetorician, historian and poet (1590–1640)

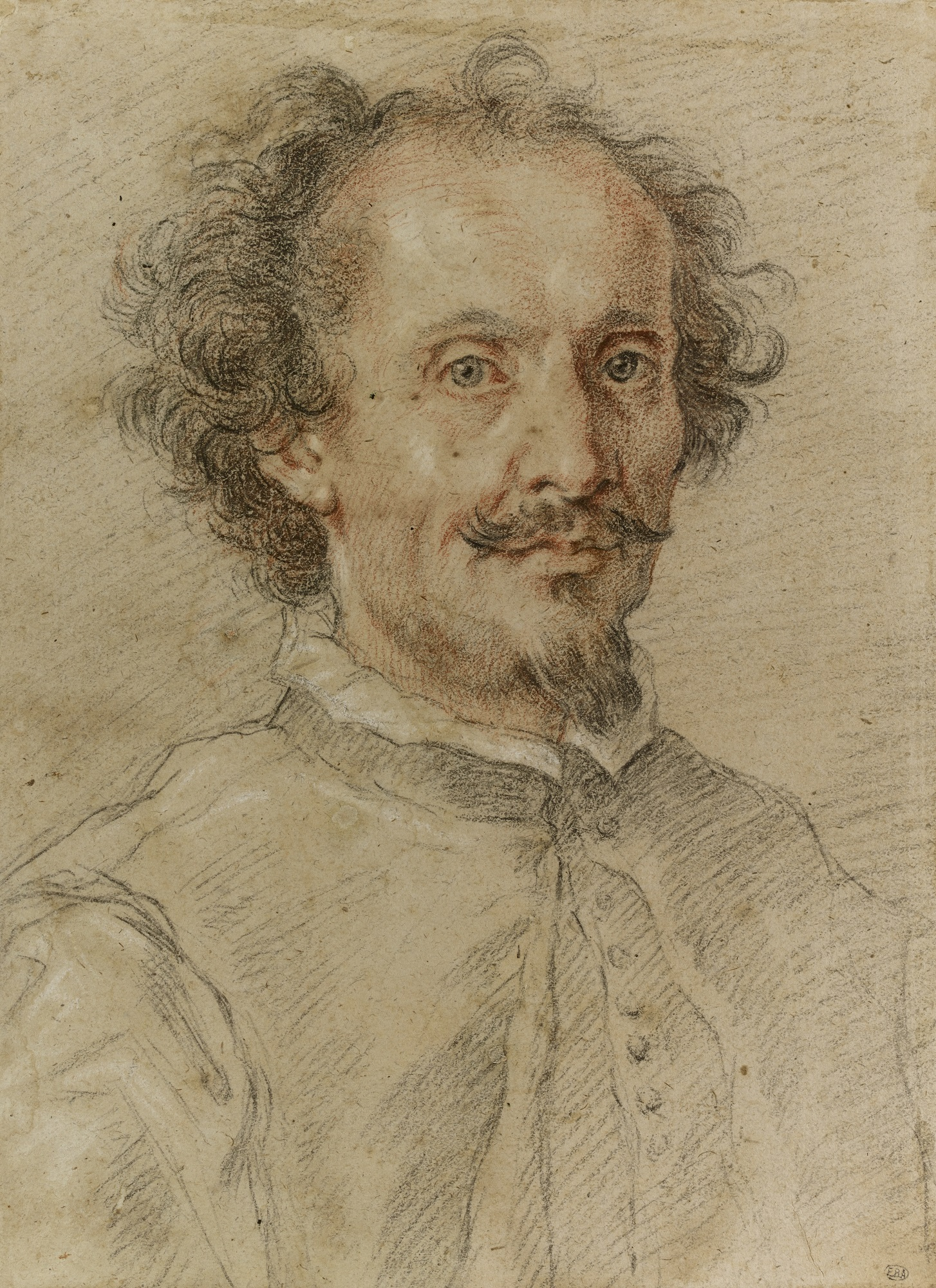
- Bernini, Portrait of Agostino Mascardi, Paris, École nationale supérieure des beaux-arts
- Born: September 2, 1590; Sarzana, Republic of Genoa (now Province of La Spezia, Liguria, Italy)
- Died: 1640 (aged 49–50); Sarzana, Republic of Genoa (now Province of La Spezia, Liguria, Italy)
- Occupations: Jesuit priest; Classical scholar; Historian; Rhetorician
- Parent(s): Alderano Mascardi and Faustina Mascardi (née de’ Nobili)

Academic background
- Education: Pontifical Gregorian University

Academic work
- Discipline: Rhetoric, Latin literature, Historiography
- School or tradition: Baroque
- Institutions: Sapienza University of Rome
- Notable works: Dell'arte historica (1636); Siluarum libri IV (1622)

Agostino Mascardi (Italian pronunciation: [aɡoˈstiːno maˈskardi]; 2 September 1590 – 1640) was an Italian rhetorician, historian and poet.

Expelled from the Jesuit Order by his superiors, Mascardi pursued a successful career as a secretary for various important figures, and became a renowned writer and professor of rhetoric at the Sapienza University of Rome. He was a member of several learned societies and wrote a seminal treatise, "Dell'arte historica" (1636) advocating history as a powerful instrument of ethical and religious persuasion and largely focusing on the interplay between truth and believability.

== Biography ==
Born in Sarzana in Liguria, Mascardi studied in Rome and was ordained a Jesuit, but was expelled from the Order in 1617. According to Mascardi, “the principal reason of such calamity has been my employment with the House of Este,” which his Jesuit superiors saw as a sign that Mascardi had decided to put his personal ambitions before the interests of the Jesuit order.

His fruitful career continued, however, with a degree in jurisprudence and several posts as secretary to important political and religious personalities including Cardinals Alessandro d'Este and Maurice of Savoy. Mascardi's writing attracted the attention of Pope Urban VIII who appointed him chamberlain and in 1628 gave him the position of Professor of Rhetoric at the University of Rome in the College of the Sapienza.

He was a member and later principe of the Accademia degli Umoristi and sopraintendente of the Accademia dei Desiosi, which started to be assembled by Prince Maurice of Savoy in 1625 and was officially founded in 1626, and which became one of the most intellectually vivacious venues in early seventeenth-century Rome.

In 1640, four years after the publication of his masterpiece Dell'arte historica, Mascardi decided to leave Rome and move back to his native Liguria. Old and sick, he died shortly after his arrival there.

Gian Lorenzo Bernini realized two portraits of Mascardi. One is a painting, now lost, which once belonged to Cassiano dal Pozzo. The other is a drawing of 1630, known through another conserved in Paris at the l'École des Beaux-Arts.

== Dell'arte historica ==
Mascardi was a foremost theorist for the new historiography, which grew out of the Counter-Reformation need to assimilate the goals of history with those of religious propaganda. He and Francesco Sforza Pallavicino promoted history as a major instrument of ethical and religious persuasion. Mascardi's treatise Dell'arte historica (1636) covers the origins, the ancient sources, the material and the goals of history. Much of the second and third books of the treatise investigate the relationship between truth (“vero”) and verisimilar (“verisimile”). The fourth and fifth books deal with technical matters, including a long discussion of style (“stile”). Mascardi taught his readers that history was essentially a problem of style and considered history as a branch of oratory – the opus oratorium maxime. Accordingly, at the beginning of Book V, Mascardi asserts the “convenienza dell'istoria con la poesia e con l'oratoria.” Underlying the entire work is the premise that history, using the methodology of rhetoric, can be a powerful persuasive means.

Gabriel Naudé lauds Mascardi's treatise on the art of history for its “matchless elegance in language and for its judicious treatment of its subject.”

== Siluarum libri IV ==
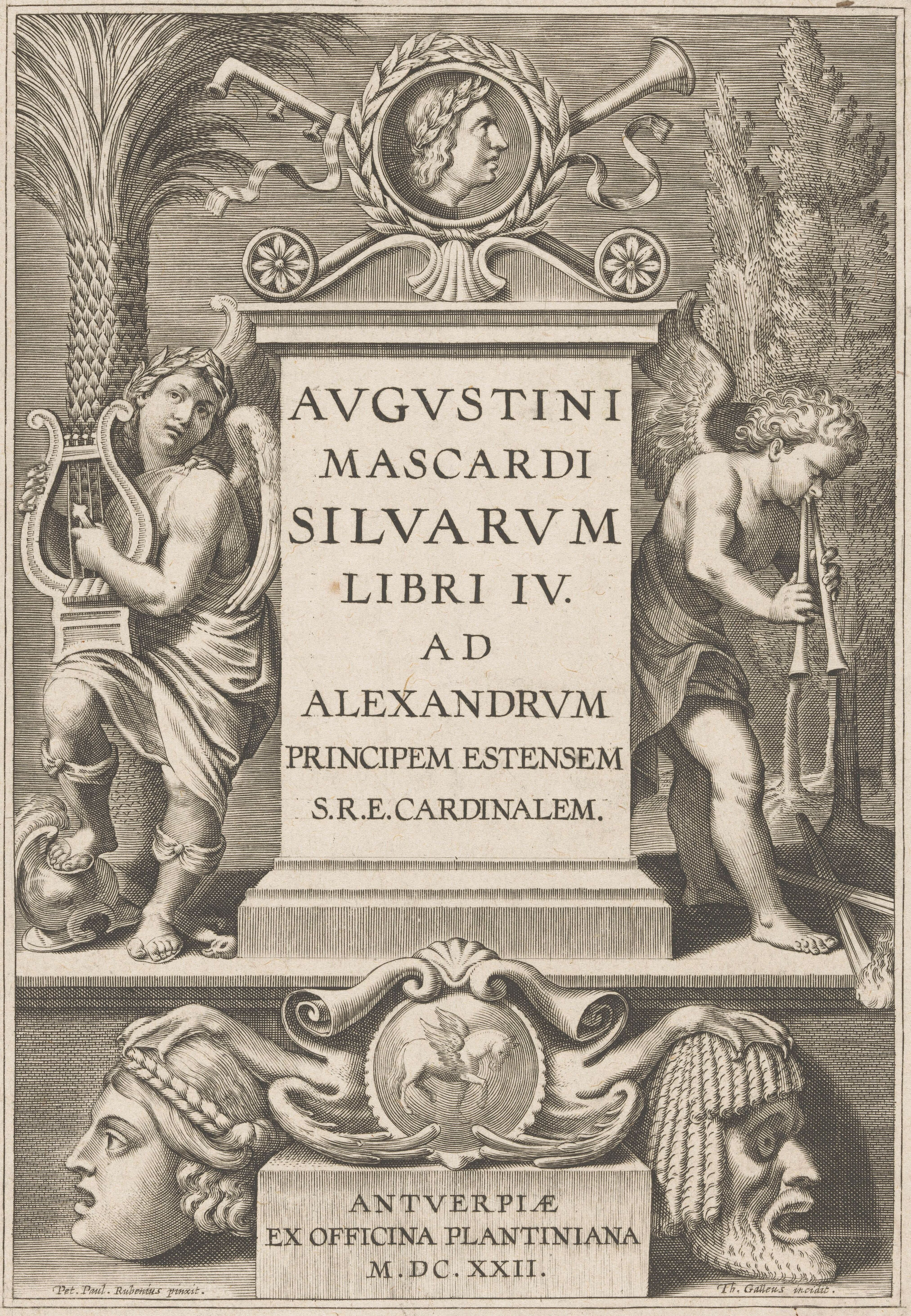
Silvarum libri IV, 1st edition, Antwerp: ex officina Plantiniana, 1622, engraved allegorical title-page after Peter Paul Rubens by Theodoor Galle

The title of Mascardi's publication was very likely inspired by the Silvae of Publius Papinius Statius (ca. 45-96 A.D.) which is a collection of topical poems (epigrams, letters, satires, poems for weddings, odes, funeral poems, etc. ) partly based on Virgil. Mascardi's Silvae also contained poems concerned with a variety of themes, and his publication is divided into four Books. Book I, De Rebus Heroicis (On heroic events), consists of poems honouring victories in battle, the achieving of peace, various heroic figures from antiquity (Romulus, Hannibal, Clelia, Cleopatra, etc.) and modern history (Cardinals Alessandro d'Este, Maffeo Barberini, Aloysius Capponius, etc.). The second Book has no subtitle and includes three elegies on Queen Dido, three poems on the seasons, two on poverty and others on varied subjects. Book III, De Rebus Tristibus (On mournful events), has several poems concerning funerals. For example, there is an eclogue which contains a dialogue between two shepherds who discuss the death of Margaret of Austria. Still other poems are devoted to the funerals of famous contemporaries or are concerned with the fugacity of time. The volume closes with Book IV, De Rebus Sacris (On sacred matters), which presents a variety of poems dealing with religious themes.

Mascardi's Silvae was the “first book [of] contemporary poetry illustrated with a title-page by Rubens”.

== Works ==
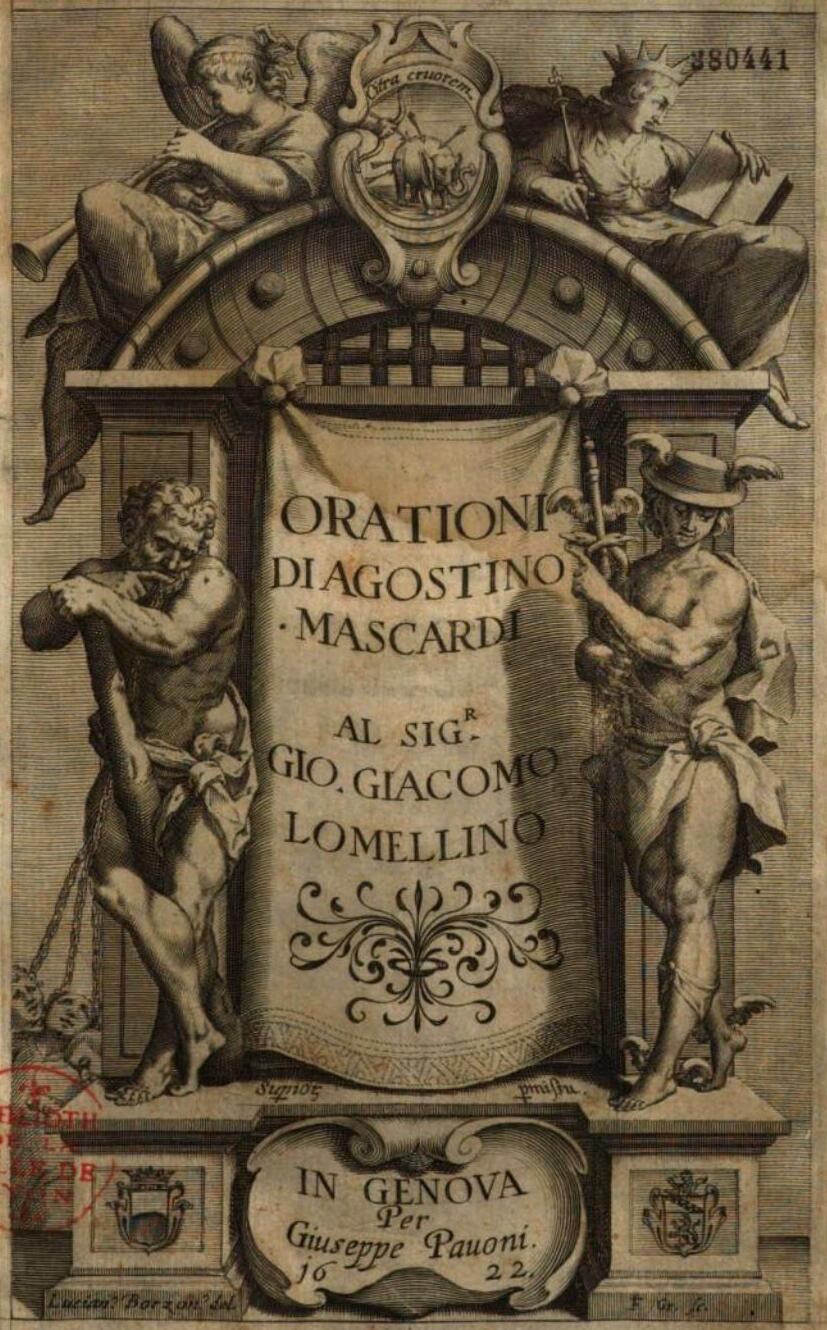
Title page of Agostino Mascardi's Orationi, Genoa, Giuseppe Pavoni, 1622. Engraving by Johann Friedrich Greuter after Luciano Borzone

- Agostino Mascardi (1622). Orationi (in Italian). Genua: Giuseppe Pavoni.
- Agostino Mascardi (1622). Augustini Mascardi Siluarum libri IV: ad Alexandrum principem Estensem S.R.E. Cardinalem (in Latin). Antwerp: ex Officina Plantiniana.
- Le pompe del Campidoglio per la Santità di Nostro Signore Urbano VIII quando pigliò il possesso, Rome, Erede di Bartolomeo Zannetti 1624.
- Agostino Mascardi (1625). Prose vulgari. Venice: per Bartolomeo Fontana.
- Agostino Mascardi (1627). Discorsi morali di Agostino Mascardi su la tauola di Cebete Tebano. Venice: ad instanza di Girolamo Pelagallo.
- Agostino Mascardi (1637). La congiura del conte Giovanni Luigi Fieschi. Venice: appresso Le Scaglie. Mascardi's Narrative was translated into English by Hugh Hare in 1693. It has been always regarded as very accurate in detail but lacking in impartiality. This unsuccessful conspiracy against Andrea Doria (Jan. 2, 1547), the restorer of Genoese Liberty, is the subject of one of Schiller's Tragedies.
- Agostino Mascardi (1630). Oppositioni, e difesa alla Congiura del conte Gio. Luigi de' Fieschi. Venice: appresso Domenico Ventura.
- Agostino Mascardi; Claudio Achillini (1631). Due lettere l'una del Mascardi all'Achillini, l'altra dell'Achillini al Mascardi sopra le presenti calamità. Rome: per Lodouico Grignani.
- Agostino Mascardi (1636). Dell'arte historica. Rome: appresso Giacomo Facciotti.
- Agostino Mascardi (1859). Dell'arte historica. Florence: Le Monnier.
- Agostino Mascardi (1639). Romanae dissertationes de affectibus, sive perturbationibus animi, earumque characteribus (in Latin). Paris: apud Sebastianum Cramoisy, typographum regis ordinarium.
- Agostino Mascardi (1639). Ethicae prolusiones (in Latin). Paris: apud Sebastianum Cramoisy, typographum regis ordinarium.

== Bibliography ==
- Burke, P. (2002). "Mascardi, Agostino". The Oxford Companion to Italian Literature. Oxford University Press. ISBN 978-0-19-818332-7.
- Bellini, Eraldo (2002). Agostino Mascardi tra "ars poetica" e "ars historica". Venezia: Vita e Pensiero. ISBN 9788834308967.
- Bellini, Eraldo (2006). Maarten Delbeke; Evonne Anita Levy; Steven F. Ostrow (eds.). "From Mascardi to Pallavicino: the Biographies of Bernini and Seventeenth-Century Roman Culture". Bernini's Biographies: Critical Essays. Penn State Press: 275–313. ISBN 9780271029016.
- Bellini, Eraldo (2008). "MASCARDI, Agostino". Dizionario Biografico degli Italiani (in Italian). Vol. 71: Marsilli–Massimino da Salerno. Rome: Institute of the Italian Encyclopaedia. ISBN 978-88-12-00032-6.
- Chabod, Federico (2018). Luigi Firpo (ed.). Lezioni di metodo storico. Laterza Editore. pp. 18, 22n, 24n, 38 e n, 41, 42n. ISBN 9788842000310.
- Tutino, Stefania (2014). Shadows of Doubt: Language and Truth in Post-Reformation Catholic Culture. OUP USA. ISBN 9780199324989.
- Vasillov, M. (1979–1980). "Rhetoric and Fragments of a High Baroque Art Theory". Marsyas (20): 17–31.
