= Marinism =

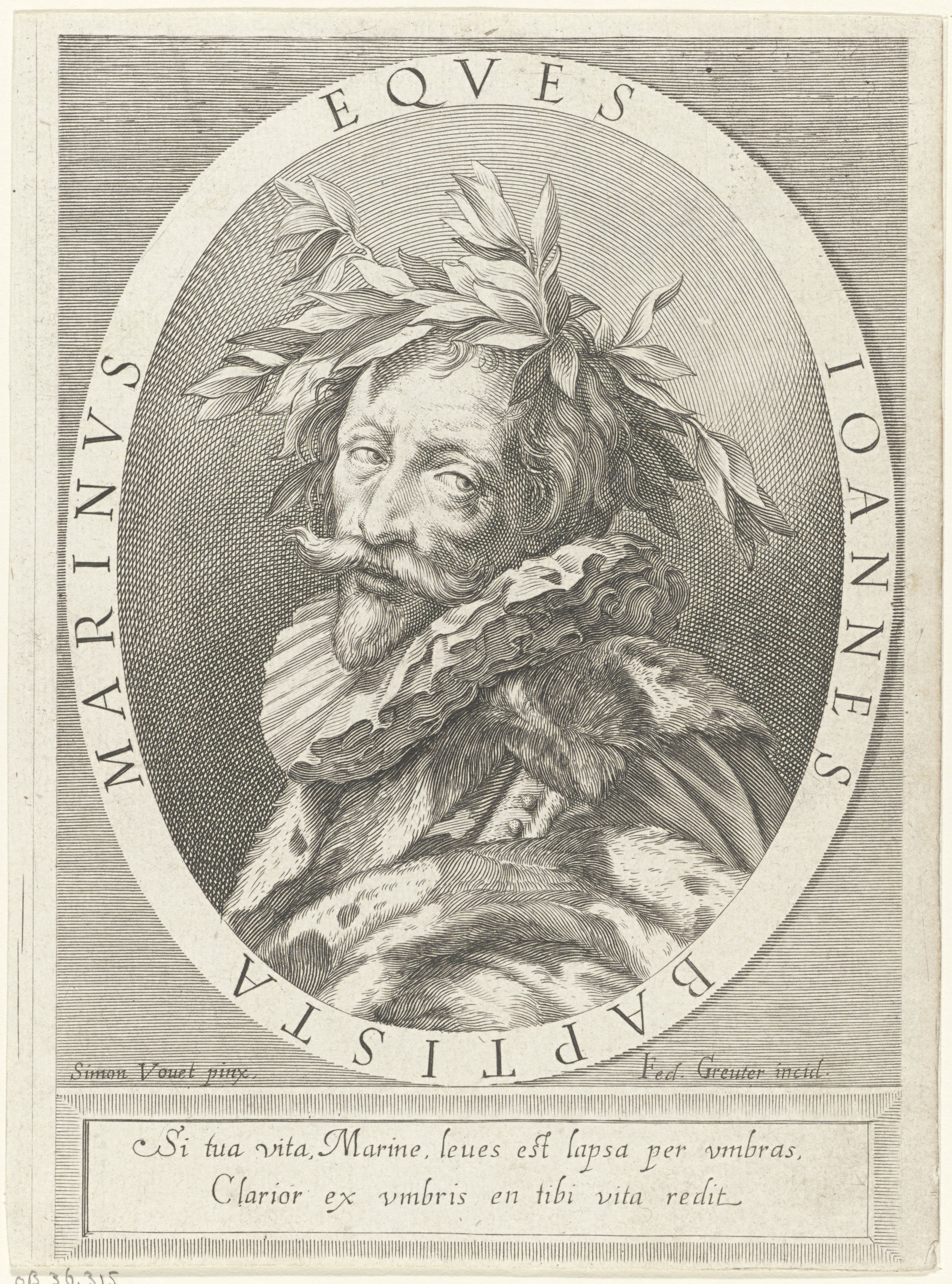
Giambattista Marino

Marinism (Italian: marinismo, or secentismo, "17th century") is the name now given to an ornate, witty style of poetry and verse drama written in imitation of Giambattista Marino (1569–1625), following in particular La Lira and L'Adone.

== Features ==
The critic James V. Mirollo, the author of the first monograph in English on the subject, distinguished the terms as follows:

Marinismo first appeared in the last [19th] century as a label for the themes and techniques of Marino and his followers. It continues to be used synonymously with secentismo and concettismo, although the former has more pejorative connotations as well as wider cultural implications, while the latter embraces the European practice of the witty style. Marinista and Marinisti go back to the seicento [17th century]: Stigliani [a detractor] refers [in 1627] to Marino's followers as i Marinisti (Occhiale, p.516). Elsewhere (Epist., II, p. 304) he speaks of la trama marinesca (the Marinesque intrigue).

The following discussion is based on Mirollo's analysis.

=== Themes ===
- "The activities of a Petrarchan lady who is designated simply as Donna or given the name Lilla." The lady is impossible, inaccessible, cruel, and yet fully occupied with walks, rides, games, and tourism, all of which Marino describes and comments on at length. "To sum up, the poet favoured material dealing with (1) the domestic and social activities of the beloved lady and any odd features of her appearance; (2) the variety of disguises under which she might be found, from socialite to sea nymph; (3) the talent or renown of famous women living at the time." The famous women include the Princess of Stigliano, Signora N. Biscia, Signora V. Spinola, and others.
- "Subjects that allow the poet to develop fully and richly the motif of sensual delight." This ranges from fantasies about kissing the beloved, to actual kissing, through to the sexual act itself.
- "Curious and bizarre subjects, sometimes bordering on the grotesque and ugly [...] capricci."

=== Ornament ===
- "Latinate inversion and displacement," which is used not for obfuscation but to place the vital elements of each sentence in prominent positions, either at the beginning of every couplet or at the end of a stanza.
- Non-standard syntax of various kinds, separating nouns from their adjectives, or putting a subject after its verb.
- Doubling and tripling, "when two words are similar but contribute to a single idea".
- Chiasmus and antithesis.
- Repetition of words, and echo effects.
- "Alliteration, assonance, and consonant."

=== Similitude and metaphor ===
The Marinist poet never hesitated to embark on a long string of comparisons with nature, most of them couched as metaphor rather than simile because this allowed for more striking statements. "There was hardly an area of human experience that could not be pressed into service for a comparison." Nevertheless, Marino leans heavily on both classical mythology and Christian imagery, adapting it freely to create a huge number of memorable word pictures: "gems, minerals, and precious metals [...] flowers (especially the rose and the lily), birds, fire, snow, the seasons, the sea, and, above all, sun and stars [...] milk, ivory, parturition, the arts and sciences, and a variety of actions and emotions useful for personification".

== Legacy ==
Although it has some similarities with other European Baroque movements, such as Euphuism, préciosité and Culteranismo, Marinism is essentially an Italian literary phenomenon. However its influence is detectable in English poets such as Richard Crashaw, who translated the first book of Marino’s religious poem La strage degli innocenti (The Massacre of the Innocents), William Drummond of Hawthornden, whose poetry bear marks of a close study of Marino, and Edward Sherburne. Apart from Marino himself, Marinists of note include Claudio Achillini, Giuseppe Artale, Ciro di Pers, Vincenzo da Filicaja, Girolamo Fontanella, Giacomo Lubrano, Marcello Macedonio, Giovan Francesco Maia Materdona, Bernardo Morando, Girolamo Preti, and Giovan Leone Sempronio.

== See also ==
- List of Marinist poets
- Culteranismo
- Euphuism
- Précieuses

== Bibliography ==
- Baldick, C. (2015). "Marinism". The Oxford Dictionary of Literary Terms. Oxford University Press.
- Maggi, A. (2017). "Marinism". The Princeton Encyclopedia of Poetry and Poetics. Princeton University Press.
