= Accademia degli Oziosi =

Italian academy founded in 1611

Accademia dei Gelati
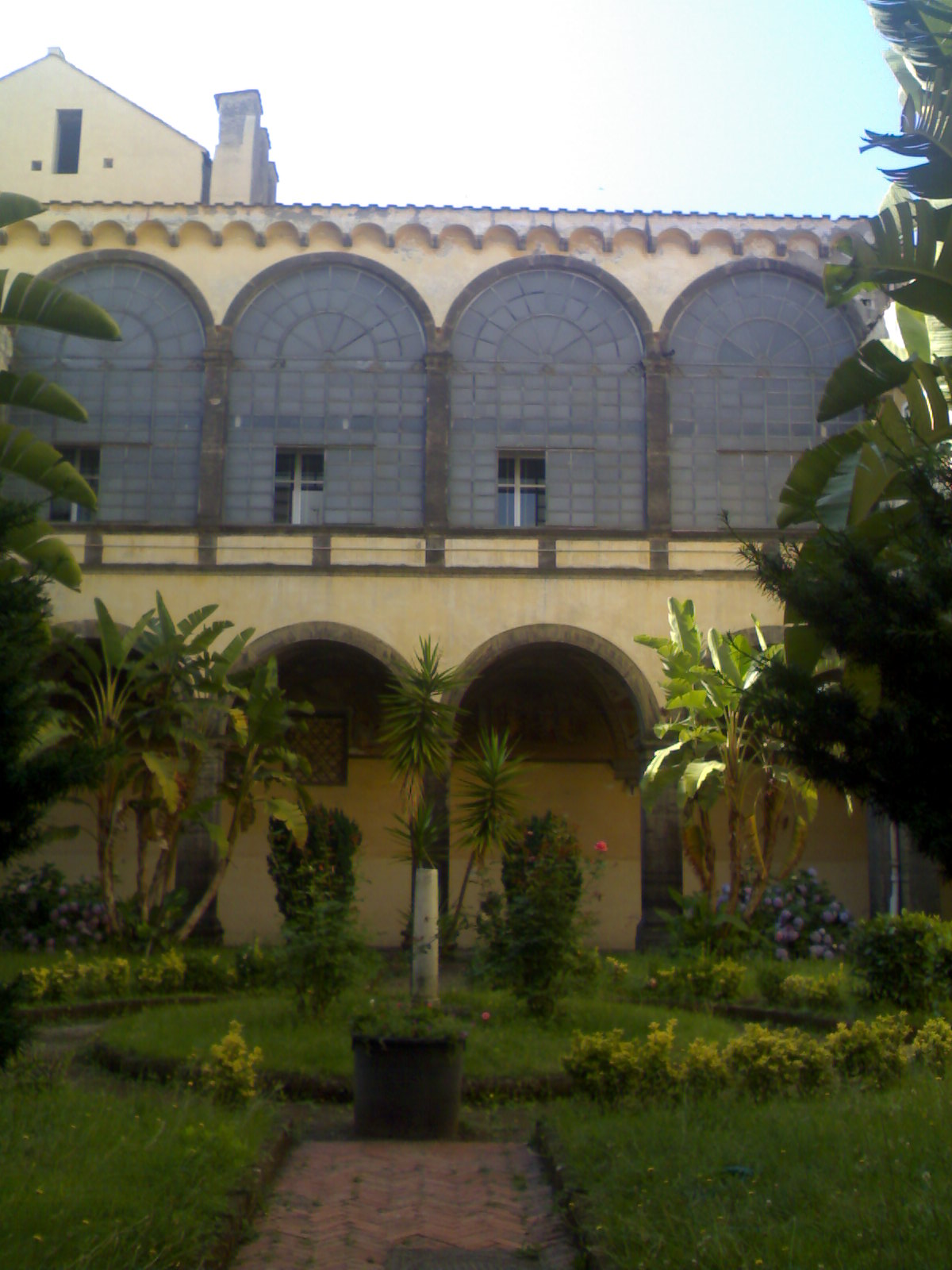
- The cloister of Santa Maria delle Grazie in Naples, where the Accademia degli Oziosi originally met
- Abbreviation: Gli Oziosi (“the Idle Ones”)
- Formation: 3 May 1611
- Founder: Giovanni Battista Manso
- Dissolved: c. 1700
- Headquarters: Naples, Kingdom of Naples
- Official language: Italian
- Remarks: Motto: Non pigra quies

The Accademia degli Oziosi (Academy of the Idle) was the most famous Neapolitan literary academies of the Renaissance.

== History ==
The Accademia degli Oziosi was founded in 1611 by Giovanni Battista Manso, Marquis of Villa. The Academy was officially inaugurated on May 3, 1611 in the cloister of Santa Maria delle Grazie. It played a key role in introducing conceptismo to Naples, where orthodox Petrarchism had displaced the richly experimental poetry produced there in the previous decades. The Academy soon became one of the places for the formation of the Neapolitan intellectual elite. When Giambattista Marino returned to his native city in 1624, he was elected the Academy's Principe. After the death of Marino in 1625 Manso himself became Principe of the Oziosi, a position which he was to hold until his own death on 28 December 1645.

The Academy originally met in the cloister of Santa Maria delle Grazie e Sant'Agnello. From 1615 onwards the meetings were held at San Domenico Maggiore. The Oziosi numbered many notable men of letters, including Angelo Grillo, Giambattista della Porta and Giovanni Vincenzo Imperiale. Among its foreign members the Academy numbered the brothers Bartolomé and Lupercio Leonardo de Argensola.

The Academy enjoyed patronage from the viceroy of Naples Pedro Fernández de Castro, Count of Lemos. In the early seventeenth century it was the most important cultural institution of the city outside the university. Manso introduced John Milton to the Accademia degli Oziosi in 1638. By the mid 1650s the Academy became the launching platform for the literary careers of a long series of poets who moved conceptismo towards ever more elaborate and ornately erudite forms, most notably Giuseppe Battista.

The Academy became defunct around 1700. The laws of the Oziosi are preserved in a manuscript in the Biblioteca Nazionale Vittorio Emanuele III.

== Members ==
- Torquato Accetto
- Bartolomé Leonardo de Argensola
- Lupercio Leonardo de Argensola
- Giuseppe Artale
- Giambattista Basile
- Giuseppe Battista
- Maiolino Bisaccioni
- Antonio Bruni
- Julius Capaccio
- Lorenzo Crasso
- Giambattista della Porta
- Girolamo Fontanella
- Angelo Grillo
- Giovanni Vincenzo Imperiale
- Giovanni Battista Manna
- Giovanni Battista Manso (Tardo)
- Giambattista Marino
- Vincenzo Mirabella
- Antonio Muscettola
- Francisco de Quevedo
- Margherita Sarrocchi
- Camillo Tutini

== Bibliography ==
- Comparato, V. I. (1973). "Società civile e società letteraria nel primo Seicento: l'Accademia degli Oziosi". Quaderni Storici. 8 (23): 359–389. JSTOR 43776461.
- Fernández Murga, Félix (1982). "Francisco de Quevedo, académico ocioso". In García de la Concha, Víctor (ed.). II Homenaje a Quevedo. Ediciones Universidad de Salamanca. pp. 45–52. ISBN 84-7481-195-3.
- Haan, Estelle (1998). From Academia to Amicitia. Milton's Latin Writings and the Italian Academies. American Philosophical Society. pp. 118–129. ISBN 9780871698865.
- De Miranda, G. (2000). Una quiete operosa. Forme e pratiche dell'Accademia napoletana degli Oziosi. Naples: Fridericiana Editrice Universitaria.
- Aurelio Musi, “‘Non pigra quies’. Il linguaggio politico degli Accademici Oziosi e la rivolta napoletana del 1647–48,” in Musi, L’Italia dei viceré. Integrazione e resistenza nel sistema imperiale spagnolo (Cava de’ Tirreni, 2000, pp. 129-147).
- Slawinski, M. (2002). "Oziosi, Accademia degli". The Oxford Companion to Italian Literature. Oxford University Press. ISBN 978-0-19-818332-7.
- Calitti, Floriana (2007). "MANSO, Giovan Battista". Dizionario Biografico degli Italiani (in Italian). Vol. 69: Mangiabotti–Marconi. Rome: Institute of the Italian Encyclopaedia. ISBN 978-88-12-00032-6.
