= Giuseppe Battista =

Italian baroque poet (1610-1675)

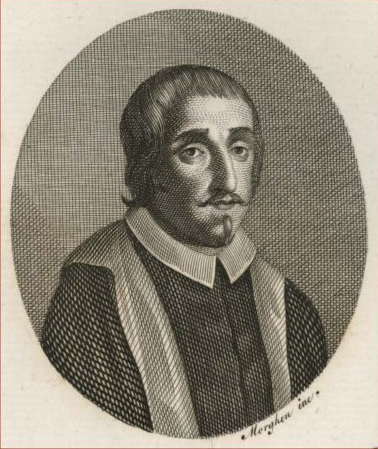
- Engraved portrait of Giuseppe Battista, by Raffaello Morghen
- Born: February 11, 1610; Grottaglie, Kingdom of Naples
- Died: 6 March 1675 (aged 65); Naples, Kingdom of Naples
- Resting place: San Lorenzo Maggiore, Naples
- Occupations: Poet; Writer; Scholar
- Parent(s): Cesare Battista and Macedonia Battista (née Fasano)
- Writing career
- Language: Latin; Italian
- Period: 17th century; Baroque
- Genres: Poetry; treatise
- Notable works: Delle poesie meliche Epicedi eroici
- Literary movement: Baroque; Marinism

Giuseppe Battista (Italian: [dʒuˈzɛppe batˈtista]; 11 February 1610 – 6 March 1675) was a prolific Italian marinist poet and writer.

== Biography ==
Giuseppe Battista was born in Grottaglie, between Brindisi and Taranto. When very young he lost his parents; but he was able to study both at his native place and later with the Jesuits in Naples. Here he came to the notice of Giovanni Battista Manso, who apparently took him to live at his own house. He joined the Oziosi Academy in 1633 and was appointed by Manso as his literary executor. Battista became a leading figure in the Oziosi's later revival in the mid-1600s. After the death of Manso (1645), he moved the household of Prince Francesco Caracciolo, and then withdrew to his native village, where he lived a simple literary life. Though greatly troubled by physical ailments, he made frequent journeys in southern Italy. He died at Naples, March 6, 1675.

== Critical assessment ==
Battista published extensive collections of verse, the Latin Epigrammatum centuriae tres (1653), and the Italian Poesie meliche (in four parts, 1653–70), and Epicedi eroici (1667). His poems were once admired; they fitted the taste of their day. Girolamo Tiraboschi finds Battista 'a bad poet, who united in himself all the faults of his age,' but admits that his treatise on Poetry (1676) was influential. According to Benedetto Croce Battista was, together with Giuseppe Artale, the founder of a school of poetry aiming at going further the baroque in its quest for novelty. 'Giuseppe Battista was the leader, Giuseppe Artale the second in command of that sort of "baroque of the baroque" which flourished in the second half of the seventeenth century.'

Battista is now generally held to be an imitator of Marino, but the extent of his debt may be doubted: Battista's elaborate concettismo alternates solemn moral reflections with explicitly autobiographical elements common in mid-seventeenth-century poetry, and the celebration of the ceremonies and pastimes of Neapolitan literary and aristocratic society.

Battista wrote several essays published in Venice in 1673, probably based on discussions within the Oziosi during the 1630s and 40s. He wrote also a biblical tragedy, Assalone (1676), and a collection of Lettere (1678). These latter posthumous publications, all printed in Venice, testify to his ambitions as a literary all-rounder, and to the importance attributed to his work throughout Italy.

Battista was a member of the Accademia dei Gelati of Bologna and the Accademia degli Oscuri of Lucca and was on friendly terms with several important literary figures of the time, including Antonio Muscettola, Angelico Aprosio, Lorenzo Crasso, Pietro Michiele, and Giovanni Francesco Loredano. He was a friend of Massimo Stanzione, who gifted him a painting depicting Hercules and Antaeus.

== Works ==
- Battista, Giuseppe (1653). Delle poesie meliche. Venice: Francesco Baba.
- Battista, Giuseppe (1659). Epigrammatum centuria prima (in Latin). Venice: apud Baba.
- Battista, Giuseppe (1667). Epicedi eroici. Venice: Combi, & La Noù.
- Battista, Giuseppe (1673). Le giornate accademiche. Venice: Combi, & La Noù.
- Battista, Giuseppe (1675). L'Assalone. Venice: Combi, & La Nou.
- Battista, Giuseppe (1676). La poetica. Venice: Combi, & La Nou.

== Bibliography ==
- Hutton, James (1935). The Greek Anthology in Italy to the Year 1800. Ithaca: Cornell University Press. p. 270.
- Girardi, Enzo Noè (1965). "BATTISTA, Giuseppe". Dizionario Biografico degli Italiani (in Italian). Vol. 7: Bartolucci–Bellotto. Rome: Istituto dell'Enciclopedia Italiana. ISBN 978-88-12-00032-6.
- Rizzo, Gino (1997). "Lettere di Giuseppe Battista al padre Angelico Aprosio". Studi secenteschi. XXXVIII: 267–318.
- Slawinski, M. (2002). "Battista, Giuseppe". The Oxford Companion to Italian Literature. Oxford University Press.
- Snyder, Jon R. (2005). "Truth and Wonder in Naples circa 1640". In Massimo Ciavolella; Patrick Coleman (eds.). Culture and Authority in the Baroque. Toronto: University of Toronto Press. pp. 85–105. ISBN 978-0802038388.
- Prinari, Marco (2008). "Che faci eterne alla mia gloria ho acceso: Giuseppe Battista e le Poesie Meliche". In Cristina Montagnani (ed.). Il nuovo canzoniere. Esperimenti lirici secenteschi. Rome: Bulzoni. pp. 187–261. doi:10.1400/168088.
- Riga, Pietro Giulio (2015). "Un'inedita censura bolognese alle Poesie meliche di Giuseppe Battista". Seicento e Settecento: Rivista di letteratura italiana. X (X). Pisa: Fabrizio Serra: 59–80. doi:10.1400/239267.
- Camerino, Giuseppe Antonio (2021). "Tracce di Dante in età barocca. Il caso di Giuseppe Battista". L'Idomeneo. 31: 9–16. doi:10.1285/i20380313v31p9.
- Riga, Pietro Giulio (2023). "Epistolografia e reti letterarie nel Seicento regnicolo: le "Lettere" di Giuseppe Battista". In P. Guaragnella; M. Leone; G. Dell’Aquila; R. Lavopa (eds.). Barocco meridiano. Studi per Gino Rizzo. Lecce: Argo. pp. 199–213.
