= Jean-Baptiste-Christophe Grainville =

French writer

Jean-Baptiste-Christophe Grainville (15 March 1760 in Lisieux – 13 December 1805 id.) was an 18th-century French poet.

Grainville was a lawyer at the Parlement de Rouen, but fatigue caused by the profession determined him to practised for a brief period only. He retired to his hometown and dedicated himself to literary works and the pleasure of hunting for which he had a passionate taste. He made himself known in literature. He contributed many articles to the Journal encyclopédique, the Magasin encyclopédique, Le Mercure de France, the Journal littéraire by François Clément, and the Courrier des Spectacles.

He was a member of the académies of Caen, Rouen, Bordeaux, and Accademia degli Arcadi. He died of a chest illness.

== Works ==
- 1784: le Carnaval de Paphos, poem, Paris, in-12
- 1785: Ismène et Tarsis, ou la Colère de Vénus, poetic novel followed by some pieces of verse by Métastase, translated into prose; London (Paris), in-12
- 1781–89: Les Étrennes du Parnasse, Paris, 2 vol
- 1789: Les Aventures d’une jeune Sauvage, écrites par elle-même, translation from Italian abbott Chiari; Turin and Paris, 3 vol. in-12
- 1790: Le Panthéon, ou les dieux de la fable représentés par des figures, avec leurs explications (with Sylvain Maréchal); Paris, in-8° et in-4°
- 1791: La Fatalité, poetic novel, in-12;(allegory inspired by the first days of the French Revolution and situated in Arcadia.)
- 1792: Le Vendangeur, poem translated from Tansillo; in-12
- 1797: Les Hymnes de Sapho nouvellement découvertes, translation of Giovanni Vincenzo Imperiale (Italian); Paris, an V, in-12
- 1797: Le Remède d’amour, translation of Ovid (Latin); Paris;
- 1800: La Musique, poème, translation of don Iriarte (Spanish), with notes by Langlé, Paris, in-12: work in five hymns which earned Grainville thanks from the Conservatoire de Paris.

According to Winkelmann, he had started the publication of a Choix de Monuments inédits, but only two installments were published (1789).

Grainville left some manuscripts:

- la Chasse prose poem in four hymns
- a translation of the Araucana, Spanish poem by Alonso de Ercilla
- L’Italie délivrée des Goths, Trissin translated from Italian
- Les Argonautes, poem by Valerius Flaccus translated from Latin
- Les Héraclides, opera, etc.

== Sources ==
- Ferdinand Hoefer, Nouvelle biographie générale, t. 21, Paris, Firmin-Didot, 1857, (p. 601–610).
