= Torquato Accetto =

Italian writer

- Born: c. 1580; Trani, Kingdom of Naples (now Province of Barletta-Andria-Trani, Apulia, Italy)
- Died: 1640
- Occupation: writer
- Writing career
- Language: Italian
- Period: Late Middle Ages
- Notable work: Della dissimulazione onesta (1641)
- Literary movement: Baroque

Torquato Accetto (1590/98 – 1640) was an Italian writer born in Trani. He is particularly remembered for his book on conformity and hypocrisy, titled Della dissimulazione onesta.

== Biography ==
"Born in the Apulian town of Trani in the 1580s to parents of modest means, Torquato Accetto served for most of his life in nearby Andria as secretary to the powerful Carafa clan, owners of the town, except for brief periods in Naples and Rome. His collected poems received three editions before mid-century and procured for him the acquaintance of Angelo Grillo, a follower of Giambattista Marino, as well as that of Giovanni Battista Manso, celebrated patron of the arts, founder and head of the most important cultural institution in the early seventeenth century outside the university - namely, the Accademia degli Oziosi. Though he never managed to make a full transition to a literary career, Honest Dissembling, published in Naples in 1641 and his only known treatise, contributed to a debate that has subsequently been called “one of the most important keys” for understanding seventeenth-century culture. The art of dissembling or dissimulation had already been explored, in the field of moral philosophy, by Niccolò Machiavelli and Baldassare Castiglione, who had analyzed, respectively, astuteness in princes and astuteness in courtiers.

"Accetto, drawing to some extent on Giovanni Bonifacio's Arte de' cenni (1616), set out to describe astuteness in any walk of life, and he produced the following full treatment of the theme several years before Spanish moralist Baltasar Gracián's more famous Art of Worldly Wisdom. In doing so, he contributed to yet another debate in the field of aesthetics concerning the limits of fictitious representation possible within the ideal of verisimilitude, exemplified in the poetry of Giambattista Marino. Writing far from the epicenter of the worst political and social discontent, he nonetheless reflected, in his nervous, probing pages, the dangerous climate of what was to be one of the most memorable decades in the history of the Kingdom of Naples, culminating in the Masaniello revolt of 1647, and registered his experiences of life, art and politics joined to a single cultural ideal."

== Bibliography ==
- Rime. Naples: nella stampa degli heredi di Tarquinio Longo. 1621.
- Rime del signor Torquato Accetto, divise in amorose, lugubri, morali, sacre, et varie. Naples: Giacomo Gaffaro. 1638. (revised and expanded edition)
- Della dissimulazione onesta. Naples: nella stamp. di Egidio Longo. 1641.
