= Ciane =

River in Southern Sicily, Ital

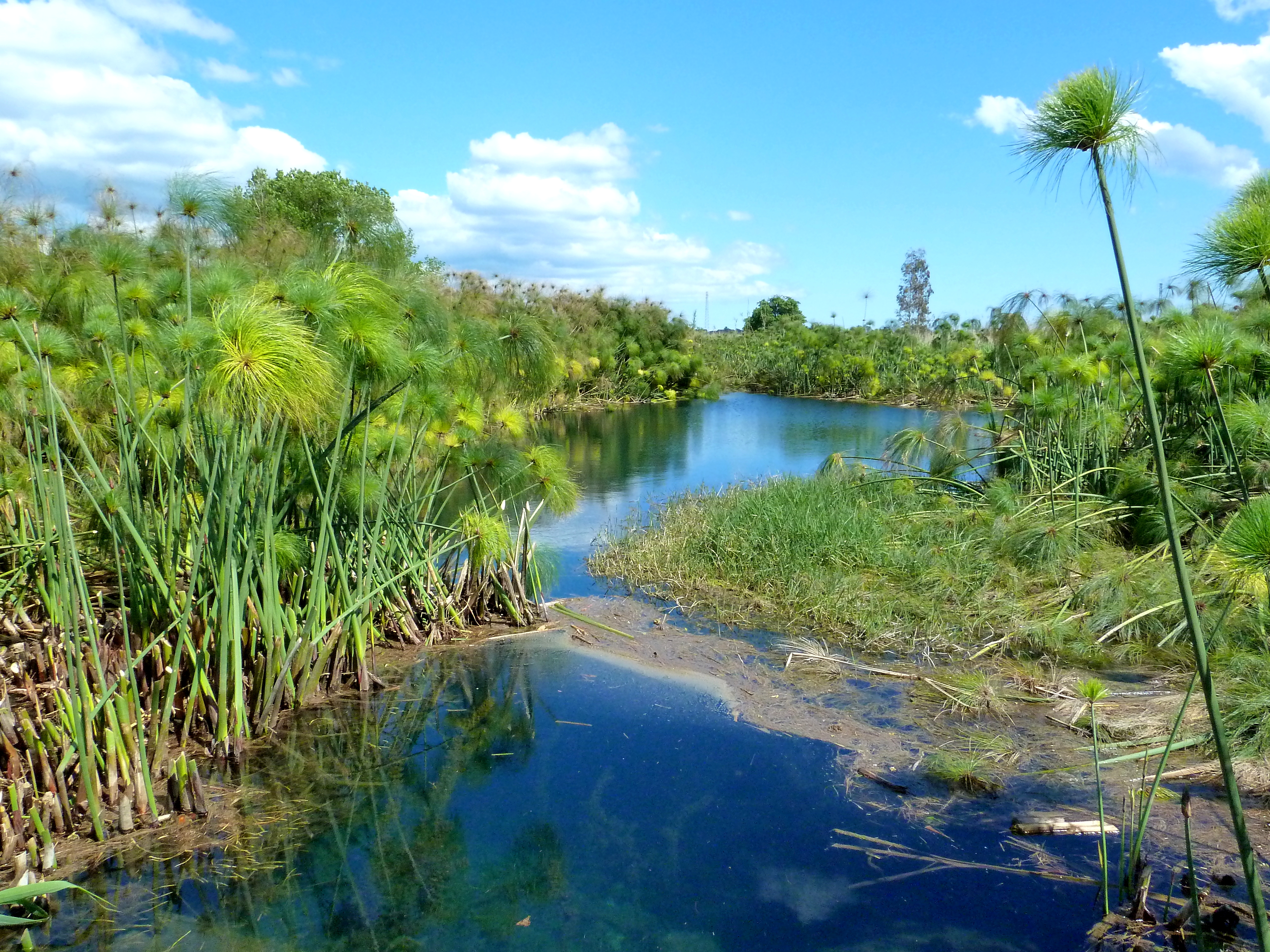
- A view of the Ciane River

Location
- Country: Sicily

Physical characteristics
- Source
  - elevation: 566 m (1,857 ft)
- Mouth: Ionian Sea
  - coordinates: 37.0549°N 15.2701°E
- Length: 37 km (23 mi)

The Ciane (Sicilian: Ciani) is a short river in southern Sicily, Italy. It flows into the Ionian Sea near Syracuse, after a run of 8 kilometres (5 mi), at a common mouth with the Anapo.

The name, deriving from the Greek cyanos ("azure"), is connected to the myth of Anapus and the nymph Cyane. On its banks are present spontaneous growths of papyrus (Cyperus papyrus), probably sent to Hiero II of Syracuse by the Egyptian ruler Ptolemy II Philadelphus. The area is now protected as part of the Natural Preserve of Fiume Ciane and Saline di Siracusa, created in 1984.
