= Vincenzo Mirabella =

Italian historian, archaeologist and architect

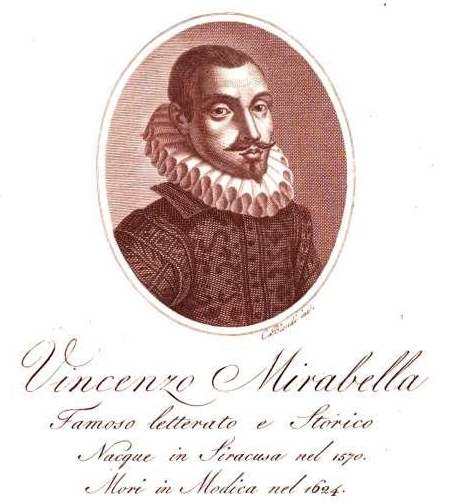
- Born: 1570; Syracuse, Kingdom of Sicily
- Died: 1624 (aged 53–54); Modica, Kingdom of Sicily
- Resting place: Shrine of Our Lady of Graces
- Occupation: Historian, archaeologist, architect

Vincenzo Mirabella Alagona (Syracuse, Sicily 1570 - Modica, 1624) was an Italian historian, archaeologist and architect, best known for his work Plans of Ancient Syracuse.

== Family life ==
Vincenzo Mirabella, son of Michele Mirabella and Giovanna Alagona, was born into a patrician family of French origin which had moved to Sicily in the early fourteenth century. As a young man he dedicated himself to the study of Greek, Latin and Italian literature as well as mathematics, music, history and poetry. He played an active part in civic life, holding office as magister nundinarum (Master of the Assizes) in 1593, Treasurer of the University in 1613-14 and Jurat, the highest office in the city, in 1616-17. He married Lucrezia Platamone, daughter of Antonio and Giovanna Zumbo, who brought him a substantial dowry and further connections to the leading families of Syracuse. He does not appear to have had any children with her. He lived in a house in Syracuse in front of the Church of St. Thomas in the Pantheon, in a street which bears his name today.

== Architecture and building ==
On a number of occasions he contributed to the development of Syracuse: in 1608 he was involved in the expansion of the cathedral square as representative of the church attorneys; he planned the Theatine Church of San Andrea built in 1610; (Note: San Andrea dei Teatini) in 1620 he provided technical advice to the Senate of Syracuse about the construction of a stone bridge over the Anapo to connect the city with Modica. From the early 1620s he moved to Modica to direct the building works for Santa Maria delle Grazie. (Note: Website of the Santuario della Madonna delle Grazie) Of his work on this building, only the western doorway remains, decorated with a fragmentary tympanum supported by two columns mounted on high pedestals and crowned with a decorated arch with an intricate design.

== Literary and historical works ==
He published his first book, a collection of madrigals, in 1604. In recognition of his earlier works he was enrolled in the Accademia degli Oziosi in Naples and in 1614 he became the first Sicilian to become a member of the Accademia dei Lincei, (his membership was proposed by Giambattista della Porta) where he met Galileo Galilei, with whom he corresponded. Passionate about the country's history and archaeology, he wrote a History of Syracuse, but did not manage to have it published, and the manuscript was eventually lost.

Caravaggio's 'Burial of St. Lucy'

From October to December 1608 he accompanied the painter Caravaggio on visits to the archaeological remains of Syracuse. On a trip with him to a disused quarry, Caravaggio coined the name 'Ear of Dionysius' for it and later used it as a setting for his famous work the 'Burial of St.Lucy'.

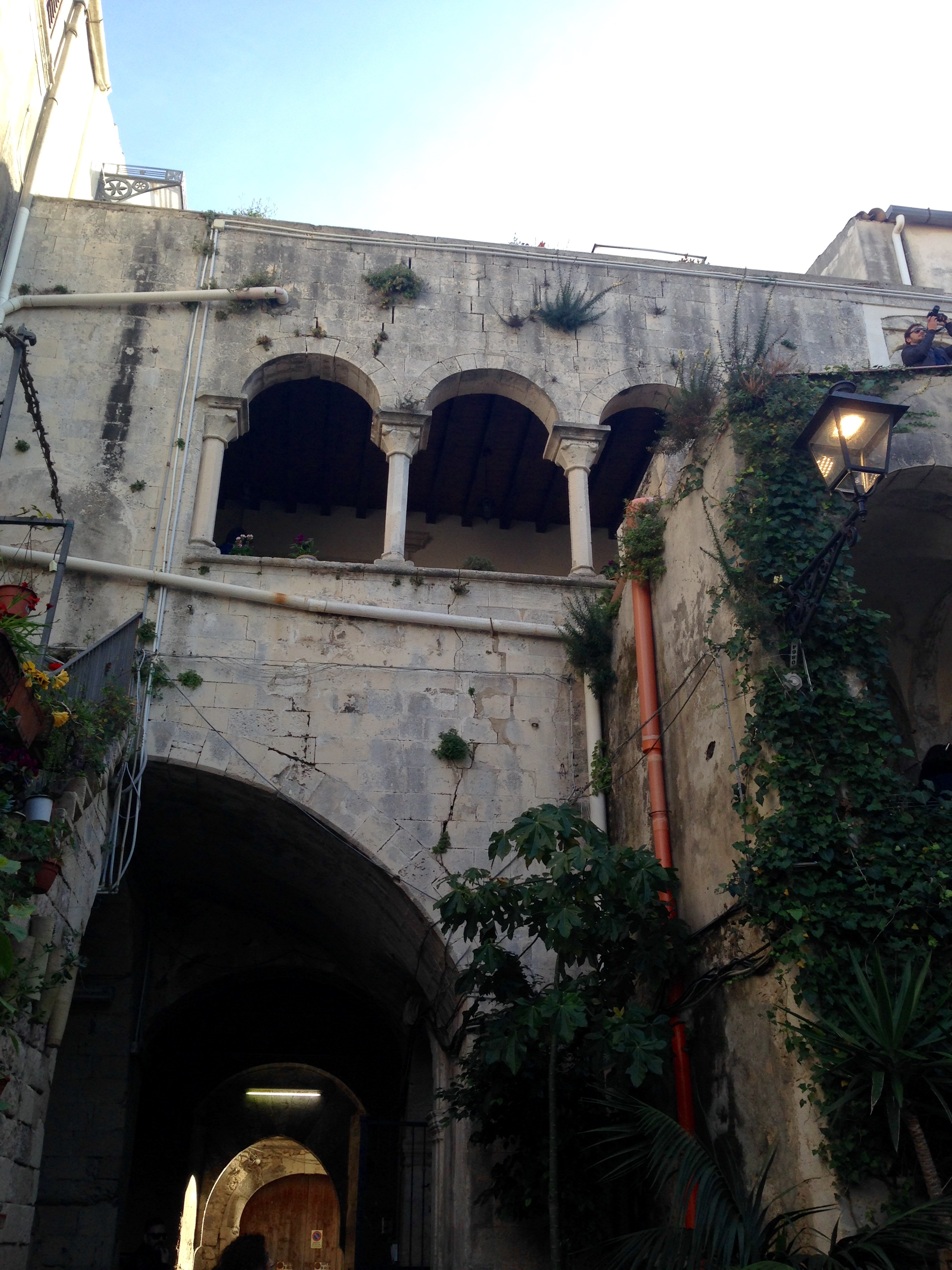
The interior of Mirabella's house

Vincenzo Mirabella assembled the objects he excavated into a diverse archaeological collection, which he exhibited in the rooms of his palace in Ortygia, at the current Via Mirabella nº23, which he steadily transformed into his own museum. At his death, his heirs donated parts of this collection to the Museu Patrio of Syracuse, which later became the Museo archeologico regionale Paolo Orsi.

== Description of the Plan of Ancient Syracuse ==
His most important work, and the only one still extant today, was published in Naples in 1613 in Naples - 'La dichiarazione della pianta delle antiche Siracuse e di alcune scelte medaglie di esse e dei principi che quelle possedettero' ('Description of the plan of ancient Syracuse and of selected medals of that place and of the characteristics they possessed'). (Note: Digital edition of 'La dichiarazione della pianta delle antiche Siracuse') The work was dedicated to Philip III of Spain, who ruled Sicily at the time. The text was accompanied by a topographic plan of Syracuse, divided into nine panels, (Note: maps and illustrations from 'Description of the plan of ancient Syracuse') which bore a detailed hypothetical description of the city from Ortygia to the Euryalus fortress, and from the source of the river Ciane to the house of Archimedes, with a gazetteer of places of historical and archaeological interest. It was supplemented with biographies of Archimedes, Theocritus, Epicharmus of Kos and Tisias. This work was the fruit of his studies of classical authors - Thucydides, Plutarch, Diodorus Siculus, Cicero, Livy, Strabo and Pomponius Mela, as well as of the archaeological endeavours he undertook at his own expense. He was also the first to excavate the catacombs of Syracuse, which he illustrated in a panel of his book.

The first (1613) edition of Pianta delle antiche Siracuse was quickly sold out. It was reprinted in Palermo in 1717 with the title Descrizione delle quattro città dell'Antica Siracusa, edited by Giovan Battista Aiccardo. Another edition of the map, recently rediscovered, is in the Thesaurus Antiquitatum et Historiarum Siciliae of Giovanni Giorgio Graevio, edited by Vander Aa in 1725 in Lugduni Batavorum (Leiden). There is also a 1989 edition, Pianta delle Antiche Siracuse, edited by Cesare Samà and published by Arnoldo Lombardi.

== Death and memorial ==
Vincenzo Mirabella died of the plague in Modica in 1624. He was buried in the church of the Madonna delle Grazie, with this epitaph on his tomb:

“D.O.M. - D. Vincentius Mirabella et Alagona, patritius syracusanus, studio vetustatis, liberalium artium peritia ac splendore virtutum vir insignis, ubique clarissimus, et inter Linceos honorifice cooptatus, qui antiquam Patriae glorian e tenebris erutam ac luci restitutam, cum sui nominis laude posteritati fecit immortalem. Motycae decedens post Deiparae Virginis festum, cujus ergo advenerat, in eius templo, cura sua praecipue olim extructo, mortalitatis exuvias deposuit. Anno Domini 1624, aetatis suae 54.

Don Vincenzo Mirabella e Alagona, patrician of Syracuse, student of antiquity, expert in the liberal arts, man of signal virtues and splendour, most renowned in every place, Linceian Academician, who restored from darkness to light the ancient glory of his homeland, rendering it immortal. The city of Modica lays to rest his mortal remains in the temple, built under his principal care, of the Virgin whom he venerated and after whose Feast of the Separation (i.e. the second Sunday of Easter) he died.Year of our Lord 1624, at the age of 54.
