= Julius Capaccio =

Italian Renaissance humanist (1552–1634)

Giulio Cesare Capaccio
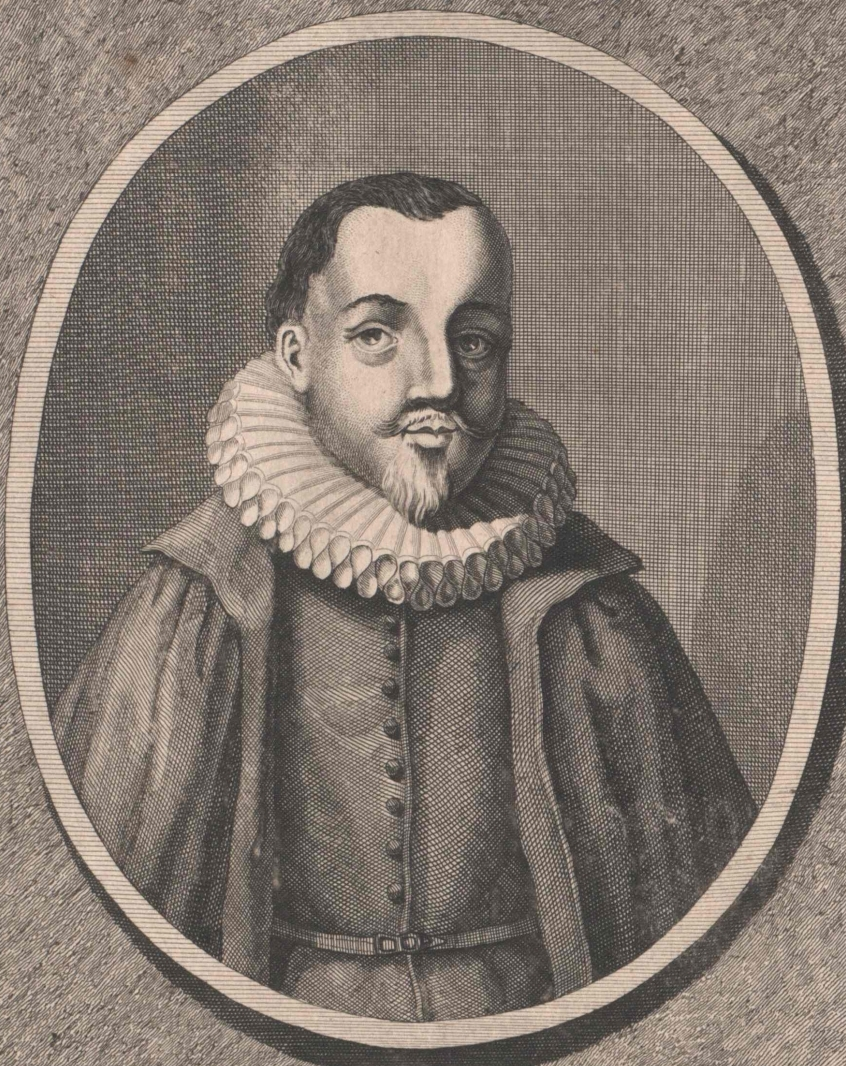
- Engraved portrait of Giulio Cesare Capaccio
- Born: 1552; Campagna, Kingdom of Naples
- Died: 8 July 1634 (aged 81–82); Naples, Kingdom of Naples
- Resting place: Santa Maria La Nova
- Occupations: Renaissance humanist, historian, archaeologist, literary critic
- Known for: Historia Neapolitana (1607), an authoritative two-volume Latin history of Naples.

Academic background
- Education: University of Naples Federico II; University of Bologna
- Influences: Andrea Alciato; Ferrante Loffredo; Fabio Giordano

Academic work
- Era: Renaissance
- Influenced: Angelo di Costanzo

Julius Caesar Capaccio (1552 – 8 July 1634) was a learned Italian humanist of the 17th century. A civic humanist, in 1602 he was appointed secretary of the city of Naples.

== Biography ==
Giulio Cesare Capaccio was born in Campagna d'Eboli (Salerno) in 1552, of a humble family. As a youngster he became proficient in Latin and Greek before attending the University of Bologna, where he graduated in law. In 1592 appeared his treatise on emblems Delle imprese, a late but important testimony of Renaissance Neoplatonist tradition. By the early 1600s he was deeply involved in local antiquarian studies, especially in the Phlegraean Fields. An erudite member of the humanist literary-historian circle in late sixteenth- and early seventeenth-century Naples, he was one of the most methodical local scholars interested in reconstructing Naples's past from antiquity to his day. In 1611 Capaccio became a founding member of the Neapolitan Accademia degli Oziosi (Academy of the Idle). He died in 1634, shortly after the publication of Il Forastiero, a guide to Naples in dialogue form, which is considered his masterpiece.

Il Forastiero is a huge narrative description of the history of Naples modeled after the conversation between a foreigner and a local sage, imagined as taking place over the course of ten days. His work was part of the historical and geographic genre that became popular in the later sixteenth century. It was, in fact, just the type of book he had helped establish with his earlier guides on the antiquities and natural marvels of the Phlegraean Fields. It was also akin to Eugenio Caracciolo's Napoli Sacra (1624) in its historical treatment of Naples's sacred sites, martyrs, and saints' cults. Capaccio's detailed descriptions and historical narrative embraced both the pagan and the early Christian period, from which the city's present political institutions and religious traditions were thought to have originated.

== Works ==
- Delle prediche quadragesimali di Giulio Cesare Capaccio, professor della sacra teologia (in Italian). Naples: Horatio Saluiani. 1581.
- Il Secretario opera di Giulio Cesare Capaccio (in Italian). Rome: stamperia di Vincenzo Accolti in Borgo: ad instanza di Gio. Battista Cappelli. 1589.
- Delle imprese trattato di Giulio Cesare Capaccio (in Italian). Naples: Gio. Giacomo Carlino, & Antonio Pace. 1592.
- Della selva dei concetti scritturali di Giulio Cesare Capaccio (in Italian). Venice: Barezzo Barezzi, Gioseffo Peluso. 1594.
- Mergellina. Egloghe piscatorie di Giulio Cesare Capaccio napolitano (in Italian). Venice: heredi di Melchior Sessa. 1598.
- Iulii Caesaris Capacii Oratio in obitu Philippi II Hispaniarum regis catholici (in Italian). Naples: apud Io. Iacobum Carlinum, et Antonium Pacem. 1599.
- Capaccio, Giulio Cesare (1607). Neapolitanae historiae a Iulio Caesare Capacio eius vrbis a secretis et ciue conscriptae (in Latin). Vol. 1. Naples: apud Io. Iacobum Carlinum.
- Illustrium mulierum, et illustrium litteris virorum elogia, a Iulio Caesare Capacio Neapolitanæ vrbi a secretis conscripta (in Latin). Naples: apud Io. Iacobum Carlinum, & Constantinum Vitalem. 1608.
- Il Forastiero (in Italian). Naples: Gio. Domenico Roncagliolo. 1634.
- Capaccio, Giulio-Cesare (1604). Puteolana historia. Accessit ejusdem de balneis libellus (in Latin). Naples: Constantinus Vitalis.
- Johann Georg Graevius, ed. (1722). "De Balneis Liber, ubi Aquarum, quae Neapoli, Puteolis, Bajis, Pithecusis extant, Virtutes, &c". Thesaurus Antiquitatum et Historiarum Italiae (in Latin). 9. Lugduni Batavorum: Petrus van der Aa.

== Bibliography ==
- This article incorporates text from Watkins Biographical Dictionary, a publication now in the public domain.
- Ghilini, Girolamo (1647). Teatro di uomini letterati. Venice. pp. 132 ff.
- Crasso, Lorenzo (1666). Elogii d'uomini letterati. Venice. pp. 227–30.
- Toppi, Niccolò (1678). Biblioteca napoletana et apparato a gli uomini illustri in lettere di Napoli e del Regno. Naples: Antonio Bulifon. pp. 165–166.
- Nicodemo, Lionardo (1683). Addizioni copiose alla Bibl. napoletana del dottor Niccolò Toppi. Naples. pp. 142 ff.
- Nicéron, Jean-Pierre (1736). Mémoires pour servir à l'histoire des hommes illustres dans la république des lettres. Vol. XXXIV. Paris. pp. 399–407.
- Soria, Francescantonio (1781). Memorie storico-critiche degli storici napolitani. Vol. 1. Naples. pp. 128–39.
- Minieri Riccio, Camillo (1844). Memorie storiche degli scrittori nati nel Regno di Napoli. Naples. pp. 72–73.
- Cubicciotti, Francesco (1898). Vita di Giulio Cesare Capaccio con l'esposizione delle sue opere. Campagna.
