= Antonio Muscettola =

Italian nobleman and writer

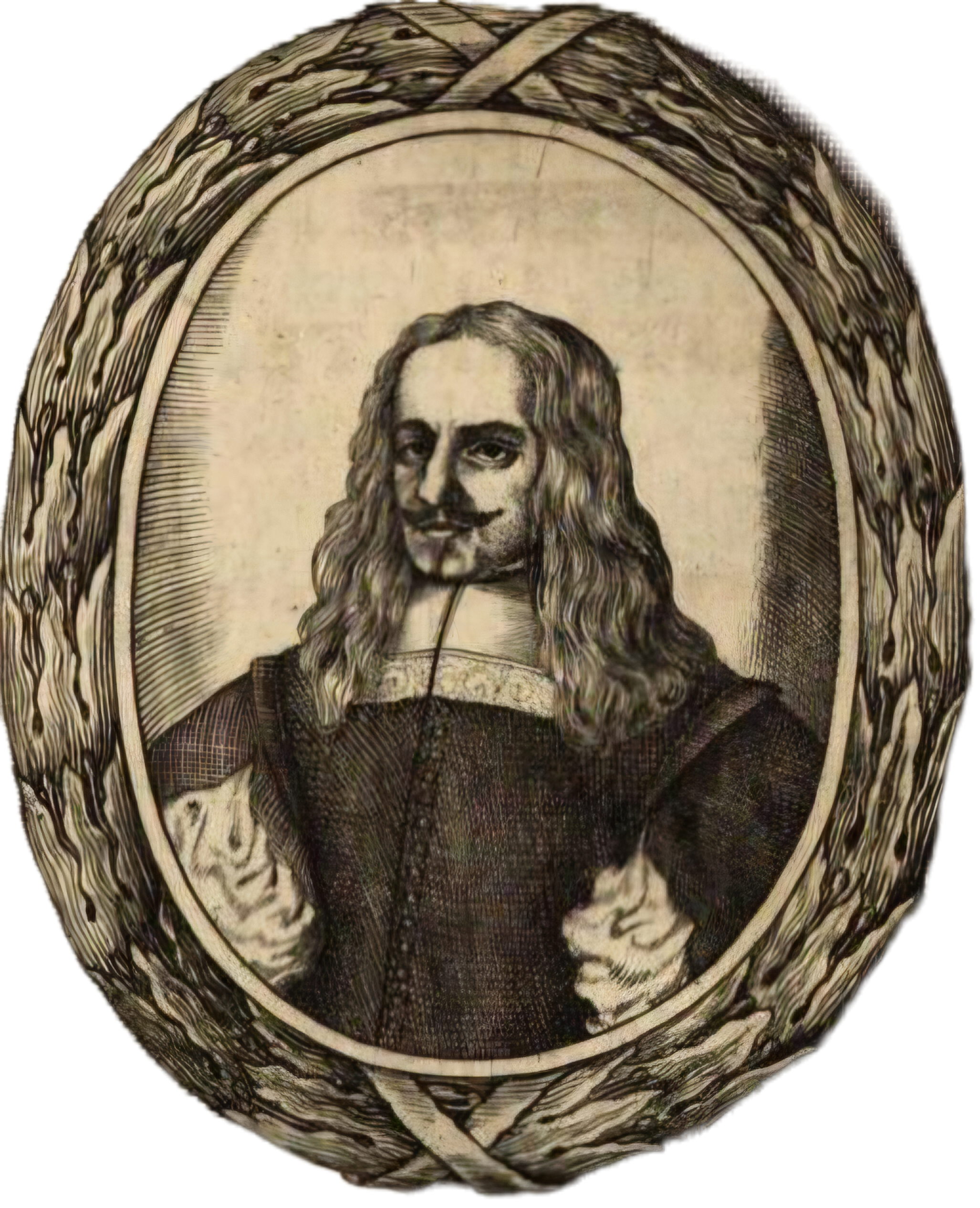
- Engraved portrait of Antonio Muscettola from Lorenzo Crasso's Elogii d'huomini letterati, Venice, Combi & La Noù, 1666
- Born: 25 January 1628; Naples, Kingdom of Naples
- Died: 21 October 1679 (aged 51); Naples, Kingdom of Naples
- Resting place: San Domenico Maggiore
- Education: University of Naples Federico II
- Occupations: Poet; Writers; Dramatist; Civil Servant
- Spouse: Francesca Vargas
- Children: 1
- Parent(s): Francesco Muscettola and Vittoria Muscettola (née Campolongo)
- Writing career
- Pen name: Costantino Vatelmo
- Language: Italian language
- Period: 17th century; Baroque literature
- Genres: Poetry; drama; treatise
- Literary movement: Baroque; Marinism

Antonio Muscettola, Duke of Spezzano (25 January 1628 — 21 October 1679), was a Neapolitan nobleman and writer.

== Biography ==
Antonio Muscettola was born in Naples, of a noble family originally from Rome. He graduated in law from the University of Naples.

Muscettola was a copious writer of lyrics, tragedies, prose discourses, and didactic verse letters. At the same time he held various public offices in the Kingdom of Naples. His youthful production included the novel Armidauro, the tragicomedy La Stella (based on a Spanish play), the librettos for music Armida and Radamisto and satirical compositions: nothing of this first production survives, especially the satires, which the author himself destroyed.

Back in Naples, he took part in the cultural life of the city. He collected the first compositions ready for printing in two volumes, the Poems and the dramatic novel La Rosminda, both printed in Naples in 1659; the lyrics were reissued in Venice in 1661.

His most known works are the tragedy La Belisa (Loano, Gio. Tommaso Rossi, 1664), the Prose (Piacenza, Gio. Bazacchi 1665) and the hagiography Vita di Santa Barbara vergine e martire. The second part of his Poems and the poetry collection Il gabinetto delle Muse, inspired by Marino's Galeria, were printed in 1669 by Zaccaria Conzatti, Venice.

On 15 April 1660 he began a correspondence with Angelico Aprosio that lasted until his death. He also corresponded regularly with Antonio Magliabechi and was a friend of Lorenzo Crasso, Lorenzo Magalotti and Giuseppe Battista.

In 1677 he published under the pseudonym of Costantino Vatelmo the comedy Rosaura ovvero l’innamorata scaltra (Naples, Antonio Bulifon). His last work, the Epistole familiari, was published in Naples in 1678. Muscettola died in Naples on October 21, 1679.

Muscettola managed to imitate both Marino and Chiabrera, favouring a mild sententiousness founded on antithesis rather than extended metaphor. Many of his lyrics are included in Benedetto Croce's influential anthology of Baroque poetry.

== Bibliography ==
- Tria, Umberto (1897). D. Antonio Muscettola duca di Spezzano ed il p. Angelico Aprosio da Ventimiglia. Naples: D'Auria.
- Flauto, S. (1996). "Due componimenti inediti di Antonio Muscettola duca di Spezzano". Quaderni dell'Istituto nazionale di studi sul Rinascimento meridionale. XI: 15–25.
- Slawinski, M. (2002). "Muscettola, Antonio". The Oxford Companion to Italian Literature. Oxford University Press. ISBN 978-0-19-818332-7.
- Leone, Marco (2012). "MUSCETTOLA, Antonio". Dizionario Biografico degli Italiani (in Italian). Vol. 77: Morlini–Natolini. Rome: Istituto dell'Enciclopedia Italiana. ISBN 978-88-12-00032-6.
