= Antonio Bruni (poet) =

Italian Baroque poet (1593–1635)

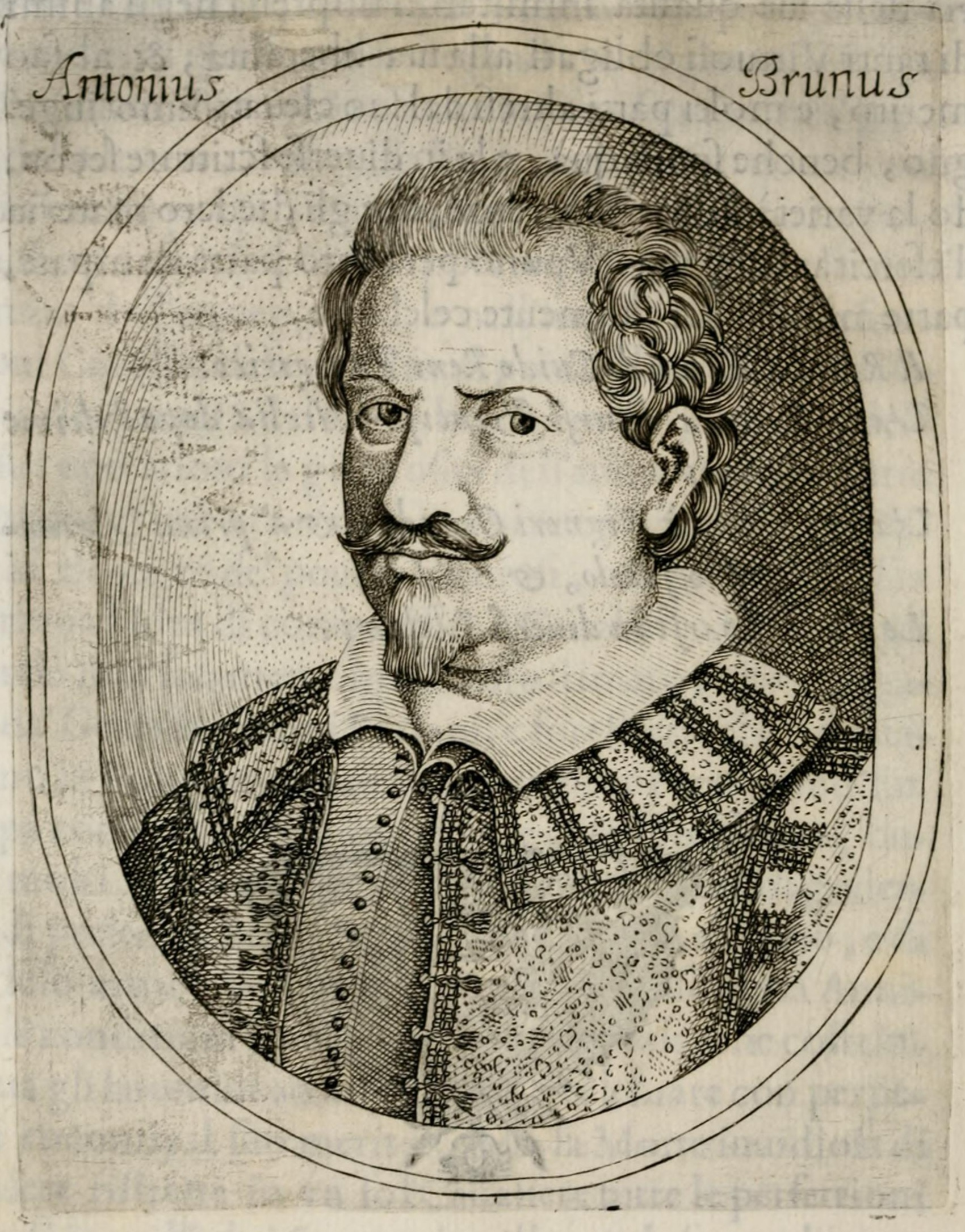
- Portrait of Antonio Bruni from the book "Le glorie degli Incogniti", 1647
- Born: 15 December 1593; Manduria, Kingdom of Naples
- Died: 23 September 1635 (aged 41); Rome, Papal States
- Resting place: Santi Apostoli, Rome
- Education: University of Naples Federico II
- Occupations: Poet; Intellectual; Diplomat
- Parent(s): Giulio Cesare Bruni and Isabella Bruni (née Pasanisi)
- Writing career
- Language: Italian
- Notable works: Epistole heroiche Le tre Gratie
- Literary movement: Baroque; Marinism

Antonio Bruni (Italian: [anˈtɔːnjo ˈbruːni]; 15 December 1593 – 23 September 1635) was an Italian Marinist poet. He was one of the most successful of Marino's followers.

== Life ==
Antonio Bruni was born in Manduria on 15 December 1593, a son of Giulio Cesare, originally from Asti, and Isabella Pasanisi. Having completed his studies in his homeland, he moved to Naples, where he was kindly welcomed by Giovanni Battista Manso, the founder of the Accademia degli Oziosi. He undertook studies in jurisprudence at the University of Naples. It was at about the same time that he began to compose verses, perhaps at the request of Manso himself. His first poetic collection, La selva di Parnaso, was printed in Venice in 1616.

Divided into two parts (the first containing only sonnets and the second containing madrigals, songs, stanzas, panegyrics), the collection was highly praised by Giambattista Marino. In 1615 Bruni embraced the ecclesiastical state and was appointed archpriest in his native Manduria, a position he gave up to move to Rome in 1623. In Rome he met and befriended Marino. From one of Marino's letters to Bruni it appears that the poet was in poor health at that time: however, he continued to compose verses.

In 1625 Bruni was invited to Urbino by Francesco Maria Della Rovere, who appointed him his secretary. For Francesco Maria Della Rovere Bruni composed La Ghirlanda, a poem in sestine published in Rome in 1625.

Marino particularly liked the poetic eulogy of the duke and wrote to Bruni in these terms: "I have read the part you sent to me with great taste [...] I think the composition is very beautiful".

Bruni's most successful work, the Epistole eroiche, was published in Milan in 1626 and reprinted several times in the first half of the century (at least thirteen editions from 1627 to 1697, and probably many more). This work, modelled on Ovid's Heroides, earned him the esteem and admiration not only of Marino, but of all the most prominent exponents of Italian baroque literature, such as Nicola Villani, Claudio Achillini, Girolamo Preti and Tommaso Stigliani.

A few years after the Epistole eroiche, Bruni published Le tre Grazie (Rome 1630), a collection of rhymes divided by subject (the amorous ones are entrusted to the tutelage of Aglaea, the heroic ones to that of Thalia, the sacred and moral ones to that of Euphrosyne). The poetic collection, dedicated to Marino Caracciolo, earned Bruni the enrollment in the Neapolitan Accademia degli Oziosi, while acknowledgments and praise came from the Umoristi of Rome, the Insensati of Perugia and the Caliginosi of Ancona. Giovanni Battista Manso and Alessandro Tassoni highly praised the collection.

In 1633 Bruni published his last poetry collection, Le veneri, which are dominated by sensual motifs and overtones.

Apart from Petrarch, Bruni's models are Torquato Tasso (whose death he commemorated in a sonnet that was among the most read and admired) and of course Giambattista Marino, who already in 1624 had praised the song for Emmanuel Philibert of Savoy, later collected in the Tre Grazie under the title La visione. Bruni's poetry is praised in the repertoires of Quadrio, Crescimbeni, Mazzuchelli. Gian Vittorio Rossi devoted a portrait to Bruni in his Pinacotheca.

During his service under the Duke of Urbino, Bruni had to make trips related to his office in Florence, Pesaro and Perugia. In his last years he entered the service of cardinal Gessi, and by his residence in Rome he obtained the patronage of Pope Urban VIII. He died in Rome on September 23, 1635.

== Works ==
- Antonio Bruni (1615). Selva di Parnaso. Venice: appresso i Dei.
- Antonio Bruni (1625). Ghirlandaia. Rome: appresso l'Erede di Bartolomeo Zannetti.
- Antonio Bruni (1626). Epistole heroiche. Milan.
- Antonio Bruni (1630). Le tre Gratie. Rome: ad instanza di Ottavio Ingrilani.
- Le Veneri, cioè la Celeste e la Terrestre, poesie; Il Pomo d'oro, proposte e risposte. Rome 1633 and 1634.

== Bibliography ==
- Rose, Hugh James; Rose, Henry John, eds. (1857). "Bruni, (Antonio)". A New General Biographical Dictionary. Vol. 5. p. 155. This article incorporates text from this source, which is in the public domain.
- Balsamo Crivelli, Gustavo (1930). "BRUNI, Antonio". Enciclopedia Italiana. Rome: Istituto dell'Enciclopedia Italiana.
- Mutini, Claudio (1972). "BRUNI, Antonio". Dizionario Biografico degli Italiani (in Italian). Vol. 14: Branchi–Buffetti. Rome: Istituto dell'Enciclopedia Italiana. ISBN 978-88-12-00032-6.
- Marino, Giambattista (1966). Guglielminetti, Marziano (ed.). Lettere (in Italian). Turin: Giulio Einaudi Editore. ad Indicem.
- Dell'Antoglietta, Francesco Maria (1711). Vita d'Antonio Bruni da Manduria. Naples: Nicolò Abri.
- Crescimbeni, Giovanni Mario (1741). Istoria della volgar poesia. Vol. II. Milan. p. 295.
- Mazzuchelli, Giammaria (1763). Gli Scrittori d'Italia. Vol. II, 4. Brescia: Giambatista Bossini. pp. 2180–5.
- Gigli, Giuseppe (1896). Scrittori manduriani (2 ed.). Manduria: F.lli Spagnolo. pp. 51–92.
- Filieri, Maria R. (1919). Antonio Bruni poeta marinista leccese. Lecce: Tipografia sociale.
- Giampaglia, Ignazio (1921). Studio critico su Antonio Bruni con particolare riferimento alle Epistole Eroiche. Rome.
- Jannaco, Carmine (1963). Il Seicento. Milan: Vallardi. pp. 83, 290.
- Croce, Franco (1966). Tre momenti del barocco letterario italiano. Florence: Sansoni. ad Indicem.
- Slawinski, M. (2002). "Bruni, Antonio". The Oxford Companion to Italian Literature. Oxford University Press. ISBN 978-0-19-818332-7.
- Perrone, Carlachiara (2002). "Un poeta fra le Veneri: note sullo stile di Antonio Bruni". I Capricci di Proteo: Percorsi e linguaggi del Barocco. Atti del Convegno di Lecce 23-26 ottobre 2000. Rome: Salerno. pp. 867–87. doi:10.1400/50072.
