= Giuliano Paratico =

- Born: 1550; Brescia, Republic of Venice
- Died: 1616 (aged 65–66); Brescia, Republic of Venice
- Occupation(s): Singer, instrumentalist, notary
- Instrument: Chitarrone

Giuliano Paratico (1550–1616) was a musician living in Brescia, Northern Italy. He was a notary by profession but also an accomplished musician.

His instrument of choice was the chitarrone, and according to contemporaries had a sweet voice. He published two books about his compositions, with the printer Marchetti of Brescia. Delle canzonette a tre voci of Giuliano Paratico only the second book is available, while for the first, only the Bass part is present.

He was a close friend of Angelo Grillo Spinola, prelate, poet, friend and confessor of Torquato Tasso. The letters of Grillo make still an interesting reading today. Grillo was instrumental in organizing the arrival of the first group of Japanese Jesuit students in the West, perhaps through his cousin Carlo Spinola s.j. who designed the church of San Paolo in Macao, only the stone facade remains today but it is the symbol of the former Portuguese colony. He later died as a martyr at Nagasaki. Don Angelo Grillo O.S.B. (1557–1629) was an Italian early baroque poet belonging to the noble Genoese family of the Spinola, who published under the pen name Livio Celiano. Friend and confessor of Torquato Tasso. His madrigal texts were set by Monteverdi, Filippo Bonaffino, Orazio Vecchi, Luca Marenzio, Salamone Rossi, Pomponio Nenna and others.

The close relationship between Grillo and Monteverdi appears in their correspondence, which began about 1610 and continued until the poet's death in 1629.

The Paratico family appears in the Golden Book of Nobility of Brescia at the beginning of the 16th century, but it seems that they were expelled later on, perhaps because, following the Spanish fashion, being a Noble means that they could not have a real profession. Even the profession of magistrate was not accepted. According to the book by Giuseppe Pelli Bencivenni "Memorie per servire alla Vita di Dante Alighieri" 1823, the author of the Comedy was a guest in the house of the Paratico family in Brescia.

The Paratico family took the name from the village of Paratico, near Sarnico. It was a common practice for successful captains during the 12th–13th century to move to Brescia retaining their village of origin as a family name (da) Paratico.
