= Maurizio Moro =

Italian composer

Maurizio Moro (fl. late 16th century – c. early 17th century) was an Italian poet of the 16th century, best known for his madrigals.

== Life ==
Very little is known about his early life. Probably born in Ferrara, he became presbyter ("canonico") at the Congregazione di S Giorgio d'Alga in Venice, and author of sacred poems as well as secular texts for librettos. One of his madrigals, Sí ch'io vorrei morire, was set to music by Claudio Monteverdi in his Fourth Book of Madrigals (1603). Filippo Bonaffino also set some of his work to music in book of madrigals.

In the Dizionario Storico degli Uomini Ferraresi by author Luigi Ughi, the entry for Maurizio Moro reads: "He was also a man of erudition and a good Italian poet who lived in the second half of the 16th century. Some of his works can be found in collections of that time and in selections of poems by Ferrara poets."

== Publications ==
- "Rappresentatione del figliuolo prodigo", del reverendo P. D. Mauritio Moro, canonico secolare della congregatione di S. Giorgio d'Alega di Venetia. (ed. Carlo Pipini, Venice, 1585)
- "Lacrime di Maria Maddalena", del R.P.D. Mauritio Moro, canonico secolare della congregazione di S. Giorgio d'Alga di Venetia. (ed. Agustino Dalla Noce, Vicenza, 1589)
- "I tre giardini de' madrigali" del Costante, Academico Cospirante, Mauritio Moro Vinetiano. Con il ghiaccio et il foco d'amore, le furie ultrici, et il ritratto delle cortigiane. (ed. Gasparo Contarini, Venice, 1602)
- "La passione di N. S. Giesu Christo" d'Alberto Durero di Norimberga sposta in ottava rima dal R. P. D. Mauritio Moro. (ed. Daniel Bissuccio, Venice, 1612)
- "Il consiglio di Caifa, con la partenza di Giesu dalla madre. Le trionfali insegne. Il giuditio estremo". Del R.P.D. Mauritio Moro. (ed. Lucio Spineda, Venice, 1626)
