= Giovanni Battista Manna =

Italian painter and poet

Giovanni Battista Manna (c. 1570 – 1640) was an Italian painter and poet.

== Biography ==
Giovanni Battista Manna was born in Catania, but after youthful training in his native town, he moved to Rome. He also branched into writing poetic pastorals and idylls, including Licandro, a tragicomic pastoral play. He became a member of the following learned societies, such as the Accademia degli Umoristi in Rome, degli Oziosi in Naples, and the dei Riaccesi of Palermo.
