= Camillo Tutini =

Italian historian (1594–1666)

Reverend Camillo Tutini
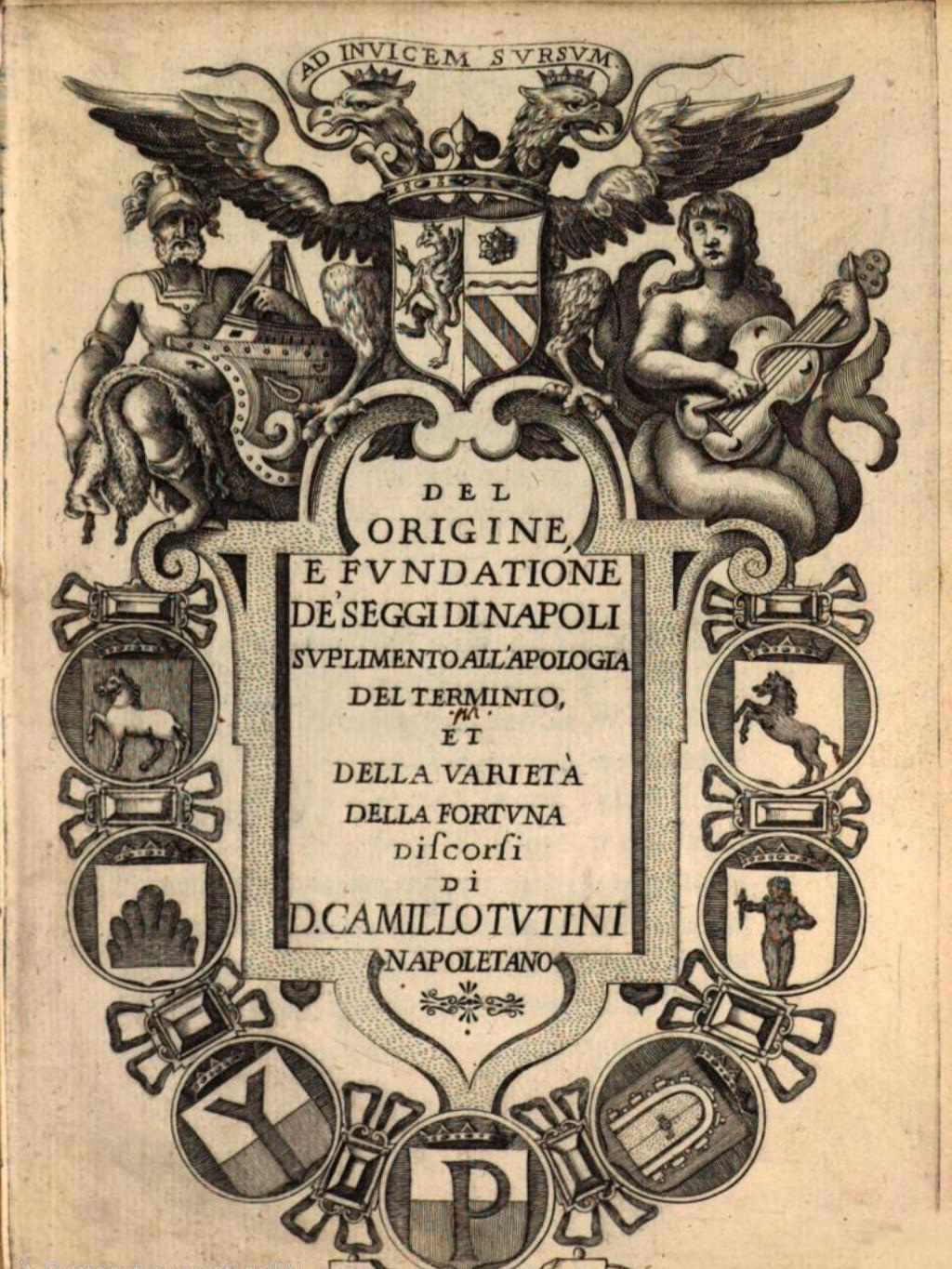
- Del Origine, e fundatione de' Seggi di Napoli, Naples, 1644
- Born: 1594; Naples, Kingdom of Naples
- Died: 8 August 1666 (aged 71–72); Rome, Papal States
- Occupations: Catholic priest; Historian; Antiquary
- Mother: Angela Salerno

Academic work
- Discipline: History
- Sub-discipline: History of Italy
- Notable works: Dell’origine, e fundation de’ seggi

Camillo Tutini (1594 – 8 August 1666) was an Italian historian, mainly of the Neapolitan region.

== Life ==
Camillo Tutini was born in Naples probably in 1594. His family originated from Sant'Angelo a Fasanella, in the province of Salerno. Tutini often mentioned that one of his ancestors, Landolfo Tutini, received land in Fasanella in 1246 from the Emperor Frederick II. However, by the time of Camillo Tutini's birth his family was impoverished. Camillo had four sisters – Laudomia, Ippolita, Lella, Livia and one brother – Metello.

Having reached the proper age, he entered the famous Certosa di San Martino in Naples, where some of his relatives had lived as monks in earlier centuries. Later at the age of about twenty-five, he left the charterhouse to continue studying and to be ordained a priest. Between 1628 and 1630 he lived in Naples with his mother and two of his sisters. At that time, Tutini started his correspondence with Ferdinando Ughelli, a librarian at the Vatican and the famous editor of Italia Sacra, and Bartolomeo Chioccarello, with whom he closely cooperated. Thanks to his involvement he won recognition for his writing and became part of the city's scholarly and literary circles.

In 1647, he was linked to Matteo Cristiano, a leader during the Neapolitan Republic as well as to the party favoring French intervention under Henry II, Duke of Guise. These links, and his praise of republicanism, putatively led to the threat of arrest in Naples, and he fled to Rome under the protection of Cardinal Francesco Maria Brancaccio. In Rome, he entered the service on Cardinal Francesco Barberini, having obtained several modest donations. He also worked in Viterbo organizing the library of Cardinal Azzolino. Tutini always struggled with poverty until he died in Rome in 1666 in the Ospedale di Santo Spirito. Several of his manuscript works are preserved today in the Brancacciana collection at the Biblioteca Nazionale Vittorio Emanuele III in Naples.

Tutini befriended and collaborated with many of the most prominent scholars of his age, including Antonio Amico, Agostino Inveges, Lucas Holstenius and Leo Allatius.

== Works ==
- Memorie della vita miracoli, e culto di San Gianuario martire vescovo di Benevento, e principal protettore della città di Napoli. Raccolte da don Camillo Tutini Napoletano, in Napoli, appresso Ottavio Beltrano, 1633
- Notitie della vita, e miracoli di due santi Gaudiosi, l'uno vescovo di Bittinia, e l'altro di Salerno: e del martirio di Santa Fortunata, e fratelli, e del loro culto, e veneratione in Napoli. Raccolte per don Camillo Tutini napoletano et date in luce ad instanza della reuer. archiabbadessa, & monache di San Gaudioso, in Napoli, appresso Ottauio Beltrano, 1634
- Narratione della vita, e martirio di San Biagio Vescovo di Sebaste. Comprabata col'autorità di gravissimi autori per Don Camillo Tutini napoletano, in Napoli, per Lazaro Scrigno, 1635
- Historia della famiglia Blanch, in Napoli, nella Stamparia di Ottavio Beltrano, 1641
- Della varietà della fortuna, discorso di D. Camillo Tutini napoletano, in Napoli, 1643
- Sopplimento all'Apologia del Terminio, in Napoli, s.n., 1643
- Dell'origine, e fundation de Seggi di Napoli, del tempo in che furono instituiti, e della separation de' nobili dal popolo; Del supplimento al Terminio, oue si aggiungono alcune famiglie tralasciate da esso alla sua apologia, & Della varietà della fortuna confermata con la caduta di molte famiglie del regno, discorsi di don Camillo Tutini napolitano published by Beltrano, Naples, 1644. - About the foundation of the Seggi or Sedili of Naples (six administrative units, mainly composed of aristocrats, based on neighborhoods)
- Prodigiosi portenti del Monte Vesuvio, in Napoli, s.n., 1650
- Rerum sacrarum sylvula. Auctore Michaele Monacho canonico Capuano. Opus posthumum. Accurante Camillo Tutino, Romae, ex typographia reu. Camerae Apostolicae, 1655
- Discorsi de sette officij overo de sette grandi del Regno di Napoli di don Camillo Tutini napoletano. Parte prima. Nella quale si tratta, del Contestabile, del Maestro Giustitieri, e dell'Ammirante, in Roma, per Iacomo Dragondelli, 1666
- Historia della famiglia Blanch (containing a biography of the Contemporary General Gian Tomaso Blanch who fought for the Spanish Army), by Don Camillo Tutini with supplement by Carlo De Lellis, Published by Ludovico Cavallo, Naples, 1670.

== Bibliography ==
- Galasso, Giuseppe (1978). "Una ipotesi di blocco storico oligarchico-borghese nella Napoli del '600: i Seggi di Camillo Tutini fra politica e storiografia". Rivista Storica Italiana. XC: 507–530.
- Witkowski, Rafał (2006). "Camillo Tutini's Prospectus Historiae Ordinis Carthusiani and Joaquin Alfaura's Omnium Domorum Ordinis Cartusiani ... Origines – 17th century Compendium on the History of the Carthusian Order". Analecta Cartusiana. 229: 103–117.
- D'Alessio, Silvana (2020). "TUTINI, Camillo". Dizionario Biografico degli Italiani (in Italian). Vol. 97: Trivulzio–Valeri. Rome: Istituto dell'Enciclopedia Italiana. ISBN 978-88-12-00032-6.
