= Ear of Dionysius =

Limestone cave in Syracuse, Sicily

Orecchio di Dionisio Ear of Dionysius
- Orecchio di Dionisio
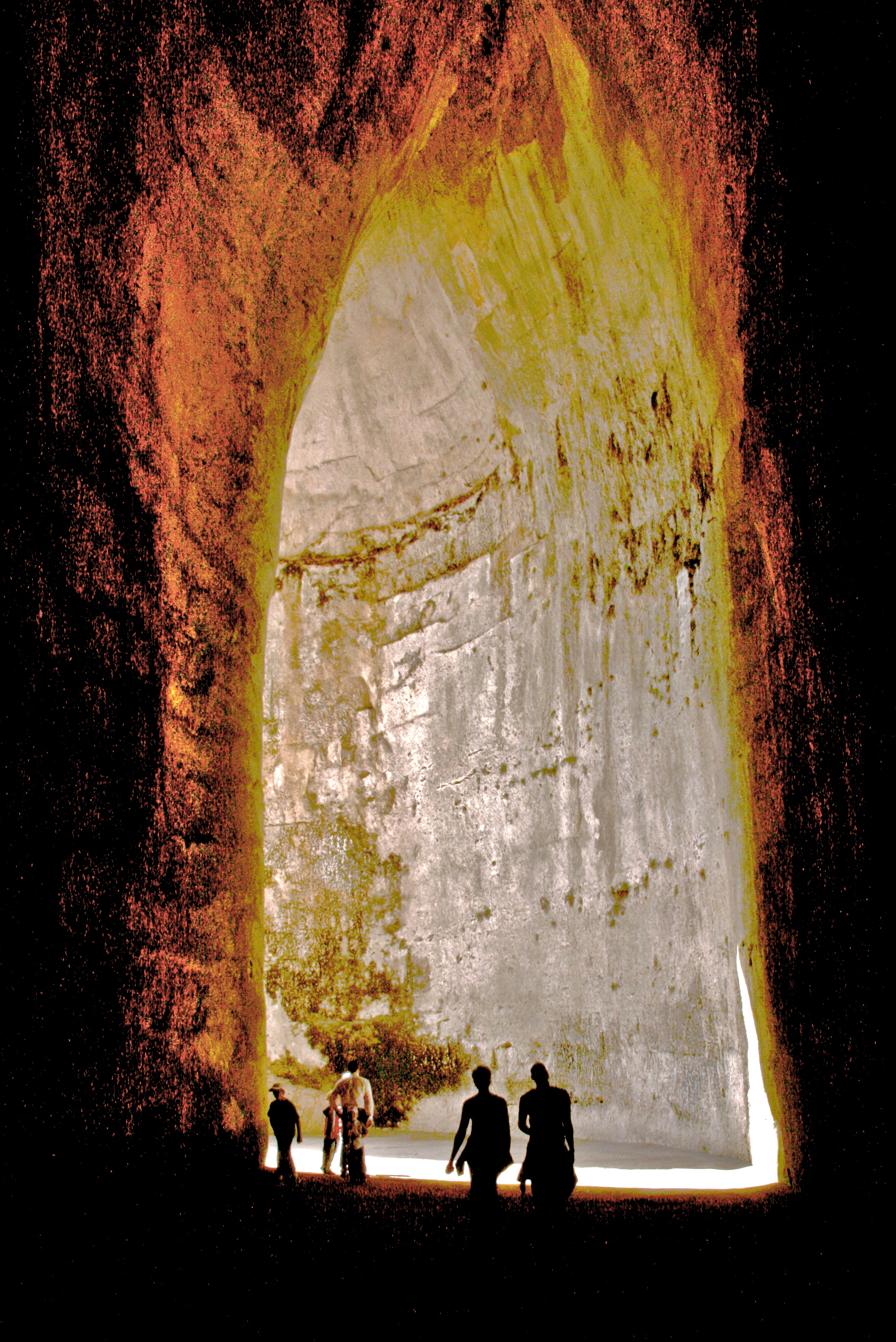
- Interactive map of Orecchio di Dionisio; Ear of Dionysius
- Location: Syracuse (SR, Sicily, Italy)
- Coordinates: 37°04′34.45″N 15°16′34.50″E
- Depth: 70 metres (230 ft)
- Length: 65 metres (213 ft)
- Elevation: 400 amsl
- Entrances: 1
- Website: Orecchio di Dionisio

The Ear of Dionysius (Italian: Orecchio di Dionisio) is a limestone cave carved out of the Temenites hill in the city of Syracuse, on the island of Sicily in Italy. Its name, given by the painter Michelangelo da Caravaggio, comes from its similarity in shape to the human ear; it has also been linked to a legend that the tyrant Dionysius I of Syracuse engineered or used the cave's acoustic properties to amplify the voices or screams of prisoners interred and tortured there.

== Geology ==
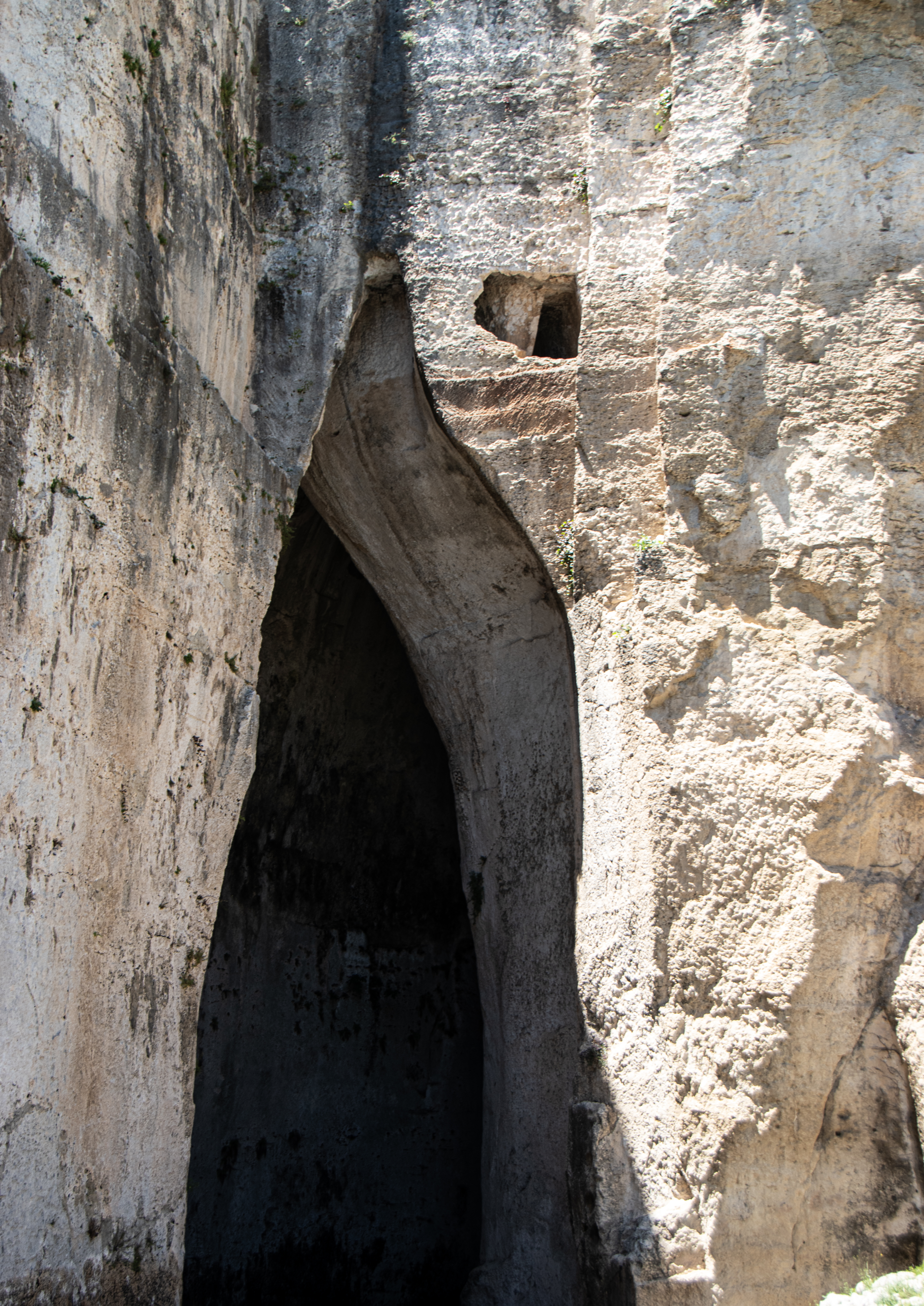
Exterior view, 2025

The Ear of Dionysius was most likely formed out of an old limestone quarry. It is 23 metres high and extends 65 metres back into the cliff. Horizontally, it bends in an approximate "S" shape; vertically it is tapered at the top like a teardrop. Because of its shape, the Ear has extremely good acoustics, making even a small sound resonate throughout the cave.

== Purpose ==
This cave was dug in Greek/Roman times to provide water storage for Syracuse. A narrow tunnel was dug first. This tunnel was widened by digging down and sideways afterwards, giving the cave its unusual shape. The small narrow tunnel is still visible on the top of this artificial cave. An earthquake struck this area causing damage, and the cave became unusable for water storage afterwards.

== History ==
The name of the cave was coined in 1608 by the painter Caravaggio, who was shown the grotto by Vincenzo Mirabella. It refers to the tyrant Dionysius I of Syracuse. According to legend, Dionysius used the cave as a prison for political dissidents, and by means of the perfect acoustics eavesdropped on the plans and secrets of his captives. Another legend claims that Dionysius carved the cave in its shape so that it would amplify the screams of prisoners being tortured in it. The sound-focusing effect can no longer be heard because access to the focal point is no longer possible. Visitors to the cave can however still hear the echo while they are in the Ear of Dionysius.

Because of its reputation for acoustic flawlessness, the Ear of Dionysius has also come to refer to a type of ear trumpet that has a flexible tube. The term 'Ear of Dionysius' can also refer to surveillance, specifically for political gain.

== In popular culture ==
The cave is featured as the location of the tomb of Archimedes in the 2023 film Indiana Jones and the Dial of Destiny.

== See also ==
- List of caves
- List of caves in Italy
- Whispering gallery – Room in which sound echoes and is magnified in an unusual way
