= Antonino Amico =

Italian historian (died 1641)

- Born: 1586; Messina, Kingdom of Sicily
- Died: 21 October 1641 (aged 54–55); Palermo, Kingdom of Sicily
- Occupations: Catholic priest, medievalist, paleographer
- Title: Canon

Academic background
- Education: University of Messina
- Influences: Flavio Biondo; Giulio Cesare Capaccio

Academic work
- Discipline: Medieval studies
- Sub-discipline: History of Sicily
- Influenced: Rosario Gregorio

Antonio Amico (1586 – 21 October 1641), better known as Antonino, was a Roman Catholic Canon of Palermo, and ecclesiastical historian of Syracuse and Messina. Philip IV awarded him the title Royal Historiographer of Sicily in 1622. Amico conducted extensive archival research in Sicily, discovering and transcribing important documents relating to the history of the island. He died in 1641, having published several historical works of great value, and leaving many others in manuscript. Amico's manuscripts were deposited after his death in the libraries of the duke of Madonia and of Jaime de Palafox y Cardona, archbishop of Palermo.

== Main works ==
- Sacræ Domus Templi, sive Militum Templariorum, Notitiæ et Tabularia, Palermo, 1636, fol.
- Dissertatio historica, et chronologica de antiquo Urbis Syracusarum archiepiscopatu. Naples: apud Octavium Beltranum. 1640. This work relates to the serious disputes between the three churches of Syracuse, Palermo, and Messina, respecting the metropolitan title and rights, and was inserted, with the answers, in the Thesaurus Antiquitatum Siciliæ, tom. II, Leyden, 1723.
- Series Ammiratorum Insulæ Siciliæ ab anno Domini DCCCXLII usque ad annum MDCXL. Palermo: apud Petrum Coppola. 1640.
- De Messanensis Prioratus Militum Sancti Joannis Origine. Palermo: apud Petrum Coppola. 1640.
- A history of the Sicilian viceroys written in Spanish, and entitled Chronologia de los Virreyes, Presidentes, y de otras personas que han governado el Reyno de Sicilia, Palermo, 1640, 1687, 4to.
- Brevis et exacta narratio....Siciliæ regum annales ab anno 1060 usque ad præsens sæculum.
