= Luigi Groto =

Italian poet, lutenist, and actor (1541–1585)

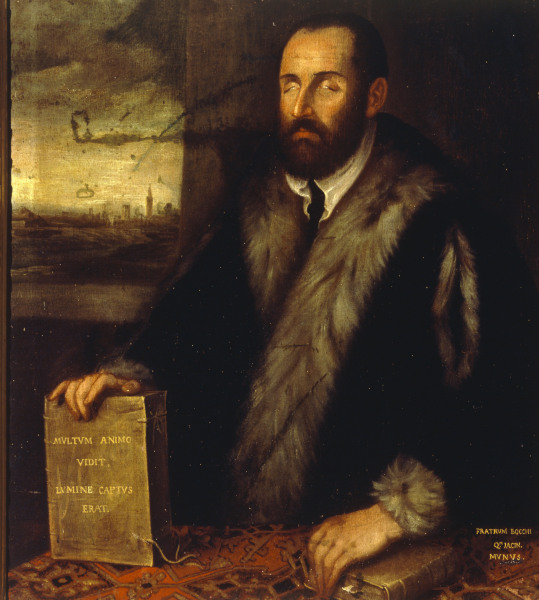
Luigi Grotto, painting by Jacopo Robusti Tintoretto

Luigi Groto, also called Cieco d'Adria or Cieco D'Hadria (the blind man of Adria) (7 September 1541, Adria – 13 December 1585, Venezia), was a blind Italian poet, lutenist, playwright and actor. Groto was born in Veneto and lost his sight eight days after birth. He studied philosophy and literature with such success that at the age of 15 he was already a public orator. He was often in Venice as an envoy from Veneto, and entertained with public performances of his songs. In 1565 he was appointed president of the newly founded Academy of Illustrati of Adria. He died in Venice, having just come from the theater where he had played the role of the blind King Oedipus. In 1623 Filippo Bonaffino set some of his poetry to music in a book of madrigals.

== Works ==
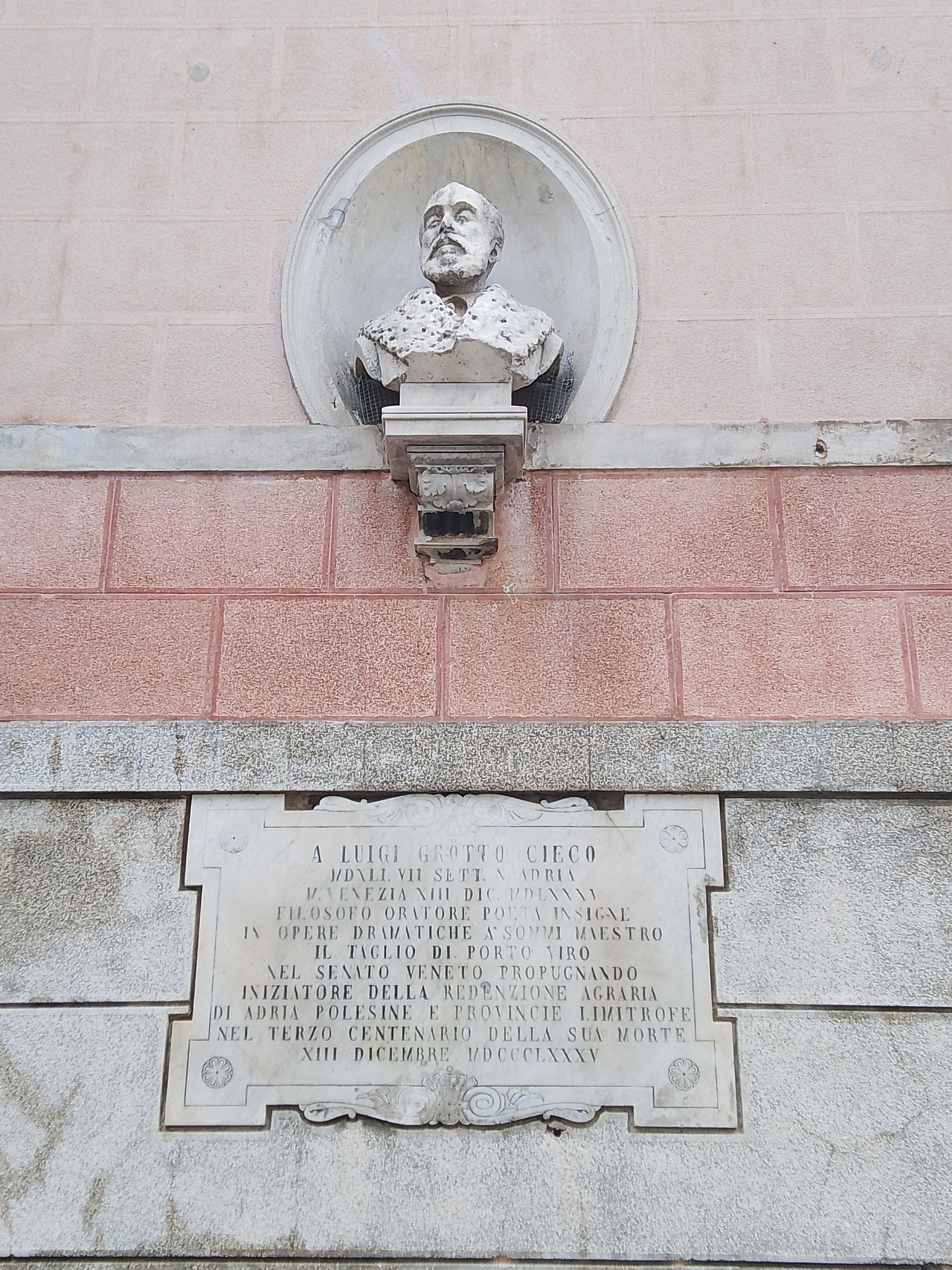
Luigi Groto monument

Selected works include:

- Orazione (Orationi volgari et latine) (Venice in 1586 and more often, newly edited by Carlo Bocchi, Venice 1817)
- La Calisto, pastoral drama (Venice 1575), and the tragedies
- La Hadriana (Venice 1582),
- La Dalida (Venice 1583) and
- Isac, Rappresentation Nuova (Venice 1607), the comedies
- La Emilia (Venice 1572),
- Il Thesoro (Venice 1583) and
- La Alteria (Venice 1587); also: Canzone del morte nella clar. M. Agostin Barbarigo (Venice 1572)
- Delle Rime (Venice 1587), translations, letters (Famigliari Humanities, Venice 1616)

== Sources ==
- Luigia Zilli: La ricezione francese del "Pentimento amoroso" pastoral Groto di Luigi, Cieco d'Adriatic. Udine: Doretti, 1984.
- Giovanni Benvenuti: Il cieco di Adria. Vita ed opere di Luigi Grotto. Sala Bolognese: Forni, 1984.
- Giorgio Brunello, E il suo tempo Groto Luigi (Volume 1) [Curatori Opera Theatre: Giorgio Brunello]. Volume: 1, Atti del convegno di studi, Adria, 27-29 aprile 1984th Rovigo: Minelliana, 1987.
- Giorgio Brunello, Opere (Luigi Groto) (Volume 2). Rovigo: Minelliana, 1987.
- Andrea Mott Petavrakis: Studies on the lyrical work of Luigi Grotos. Hamburg: A Novel. D University seminar. Hamburg, 1992 (dissertation).
