= Filippo Bonaffino =

Italian composer

Filippo Bonaffino (fl. 1623) was an Italian composer.

== Life and career ==
Filippo Bonaffino is thought to have been born in Messina. In 1623, he published a book of 18 Madrigali concertati for two to four voices with continuo, titled Madrigali concertati a due, tre e quattro Voci per cantar, e sonar nel Clauecimbalo, Chitarrone, ò altro simile Instrumento. The collection includes a setting of Ancidetemi pur, made popular by Arcadelt in the 16th century, and also two solo songs for bass and continuo dedicated to "Signor Gio[v]anni Watchin (John Watkin), English gentleman." The other songs include settings of text by Luigi Groto, Angelo Grillo, Maurizio Moro, Giambattista Marino and Ottavio Rinuccini.

Bonaffino died in Messina.
