= Giovanni Battista Manso =

Italian scholar and patron of the arts (1570–1645)

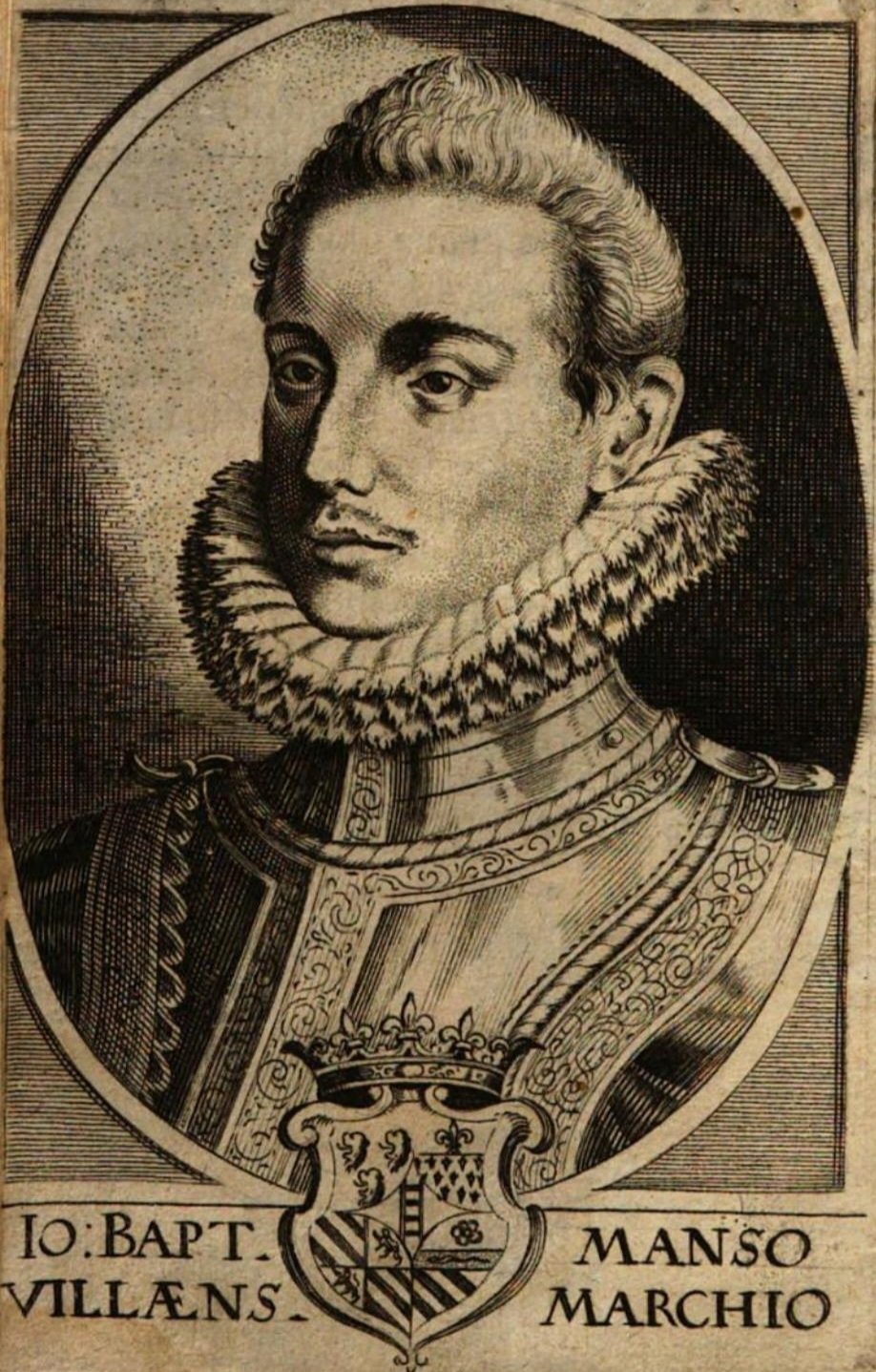
- Engraved portrait of Giovanni Battista Manso. From Poesie nomiche di Gio. Battista Manso Marchese di Villa, Venice, Baba, 1635
- Born: 1570; Naples, Kingdom of Naples
- Died: 28 December 1645 (aged 74–75); Naples, Kingdom of Naples
- Occupations: Poet, scholar, and patron of the arts and artists
- Writing career
- Language: Italian
- Period: Late Middle Ages
- Notable works: Vita di Torquato Tasso (1621); Erocallia overo dell'Amore e della Bellezza (1618)
- Literary movement: Baroque

Giovanni Battista Manso (1570 – 28 December 1645) was an Italian aristocrat, scholar, and patron of the arts and artists. He was for many years the leading figure in Neapolitan poetic and intellectual circles.

== Biography ==
Giovanni Battista Manso was a wealthy nobleman and a prominent patron of the arts and letters in Naples during the late sixteenth century and the first half of the seventeenth century. In his youth he fought in the service of both the House of Savoy and the Spanish viceroyalty, but he eventually withdrew from military life to lead a patrician's existence in his villa overlooking the Gulf of Naples.

By the beginning of the Seicento, Manso was probably the single most influential and powerful figure in his native city after the resident Spanish viceroy himself. He founded the Accademia degli Oziosi in Naples in 1611, and he actively promoted the establishment of the Collegio de' Nobili for the education — under the direction of the Jesuits — of young Neapolitan aristocrats. He was the author of a book of poems (Poesie Nomiche, 1635), two collections of dialogues (I paradossi, ovvero dell'amore, 1608, and Erocallia, ovvero dell'amore e della bellezza, 1628), and a number of other prose works, of which the best-known today is the Vita di Torquato Tasso (1619), the first biography of the poet.

This coltissimo cavaliere — as the eighteenth-century literary historian Girolamo Tiraboschi called him — knew a great many of the leading Italian letterati of the age. He numbered among his acquaintances Paolo Beni (the influential literary critic and theorist), Giambattista Della Porta, Antonio Bruni, Tommaso Campanella, Torquato Accetto, Galileo Galilei, and many other writers, artists, and philosophers up and down the peninsula; and his circle in Naples itself included practically all major figures of the city's literary life. He was, moreover, the friend and benefactor of both Torquato Tasso and Giambattista Marino, perhaps the two most important Italian poets of Manso's lifetime.

Manso befriended Tasso during the poet's troubled period of wandering after his release from confinement in Ferrara. Tasso stayed with Manso in 1592, and the relationship remained firm until Tasso’s death in 1595. Manso helped Tasso personally on several occasions, and Tasso repaid the debt with his dialogue Il Manso overo de l’amicitia (1594). Tasso also celebrated Manso in his epic poem Gerusalemme conquistata (Jerusalem Conquered).

Among cavaliers magnanimous and courteous
Manso is resplendent.

— Gerusalemme conquistata, Book XX

Manso repeatedly rescued Marino from personal and legal problems, even helping him to flee to Rome in order to escape the threat of a death sentence from the viceroy of Naples following a daring attempt to rescue a friend from prison. Later, Manso had Marino personally supervise the republication of Il Manso and worked on a biography of Marino after the latter's death in 1625. By late 1638, when John Milton visited Manso in Naples, his aging host had become “a living symbol of Italian literature,” one whose life was widely seen to be “identified at many points with the course of Italian literature during the preceding half-century, and more especially with the intellectual interests of Southern Italy in its condition as a Spanish province.” Manso introduced Milton to the Accademia degli Oziosi. Milton, before leaving the city, wrote his Latin poem Mansus and presented it to the marquis as a farewell gift.

== Works ==
- I paradossi overo dell'Amore dialogi. Milan: appresso Girolamo Bordoni libraro. 1608.
- Erocallia overo dell'Amore e della Bellezza. Venice: Evangelista Deuchino. 1628.
- Poesie nomiche divise in Rime amorose, sacre e morali. Venice: Francesco Baba. 1634.
- Vita di Torquato Tasso. Venice: Evangelista Deuchino. 1621.

== Bibliography ==
- Tiraboschi, Girolamo (1824). Storia della letteratura italiana. Vol. 8.1. Milan: Società Tipografica dei Classici Italiani. pp. 52–54.
- Masson, David (1946) [1881]. The Life of John Milton. Vol. 1. New York: Peter Smith.
- Basile, Bruno (1994). "La Vita tassiana di Giovan Battista Manso". Tra storia e simbolo: studi dedicati a Ezio Raimondi dai direttori, redattori e dall'editore di Lettere italiane. Florence: Leo S. Olschki. pp. 143–162. doi:10.1400/239210.
- Diffley, P. (2002). "Manso, Giambattista". The Oxford Companion to Italian Literature. Oxford University Press.
- Geri, Lorenzo (2007). "La funzione del paratesto negli Erocallia (1628) di Giovan Battista Manso". Linguistica e Letteratura. XXXII (1/2): 1–17. doi:10.1400/97036.
- Denman, Thomas (2016). "A Gift Text of Hispano-Neapolitan Diplomacy: Giovan Battista Manso's Erocallia (1628)". History of European Ideas. 42 (5): 683–693. doi:10.1080/01916599.2016.1152742.
- Riga, Pietro Giulio (2018). Giovan Battista Manso e la cultura letteraria a Napoli nel primo Seicento. Biblioteca del Rinascimento e del Barocco. EMIL.
