= Lorenzo Crasso =

Italian author and poet (1623–1691)

- Born: August 10, 1623; Naples, Kingdom of Naples
- Died: 27 April 1691 (aged 67); Naples, Kingdom of Naples
- Education: University of Naples Federico II
- Occupations: Poet; Jurist; Scholar
- Writing career
- Language: Italian language
- Period: 17th century; Baroque
- Genres: Poetry; treatise
- Notable work: Istoria de’ Poeti Greci e di que’ che ’n Greca Lingua han poetato
- Literary movement: Baroque; Marinism

Lorenzo Crasso (10 August 1623 in Naples – 27 April 1691) was an Italian writer and poet of the Baroque period.

== Biography ==
Lorenzo Crasso, Barone di Pianura, was a Neapolitan, a doctor of laws, and an active lawyer. He was a man of wealth, and possessed a notable library in his palace in Vicolo S. Paolo, in which many of Giambattista Marino's manuscripts were kept, which were later dispersed. Other than these meagre details, and his books, nothing appears to be known of him. He had many friends among the literary men of his time, and one frequently meets with poems addressed to him in their books – Giuseppe Battista belonged to this circle. Crasso published Epistole Heroiche, Venezia, 1655 (imitations of Ovid); Elogi d'huomini letterati, Venezia, 1666, 2 voll. (each notice being preceded by a portrait); Istoria de’ Poeti Greci e di que’ che ’n Greca Lingua han poetato, Napoli, 1678; and Elogi di Capitani Illustri, Venezia, 1683. As only the first part of the last book was published, it has been conjectured that Crasso died at this time or just before. Crasso was a member of the Neapolitan Oziosi and the Bolognese Gelati. His nickname among the Gelati was “Il Costante,” and his impresa was ivy climbing a dead tree trunk with the motto frigore viridior (“frozen strengthens me”).

Crasso’s Istoria de’ Poeti Greci professes to supersede the similar works of Franciscus Patricius and Gerardus Vossius; and, while far from exhaustive, it is in many ways a creditable performance, and contains some information even today not easily found elsewhere. This applies, of course, particularly to the writers of Greek verse nearly contemporary with the author; for he includes not only the Greeks of the Renaissance, and such others as write in Greek as Alessandra Scala, Adrianus Turnebus, and Jean Daurat, but comes down to Urban VIII and Leo Allatius. His notices of the ancient poets, on the other hand, if generally well documented, are usually too perfunctory.

Crasso's work was much appreciated by the Italian scholars, but severely criticized by the French ones.

== Works ==
- Crasso, Lorenzo (1655). Epistole heroiche. Venezia: Baba.
- Crasso, Lorenzo (1666). Elogii d'huomini letterati. Vol. 1. Venezia: Combi e la Noù.
- Crasso, Lorenzo (1666). Elogii d'huomini letterati. Vol. 2. Venezia: Combi e la Noù.
- Crasso, Lorenzo (1678). Istoria de' Poeti Greci e di que' che 'n Greca Lingua han poetato. Napoli: Antonio Bulifon.
- Crasso, Lorenzo (1683). Elogii di capitani illustri. Venezia: Combi e la Noù.

== Bibliography ==
- Hutton, James (1935). The Greek Anthology in Italy to the Year 1800. Ithaca: Cornell University Press. pp. 373–374.
- Belloni, Antonio (1931). "CRASSO, Lorenzo". Enciclopedia Italiana. Rome: Istituto dell'Enciclopedia Italiana.
- Caterina Serra (2000). "Gli "Elogi" d'uomini letterati di Lorenzo Crasso". Esperienze Letterarie. 25 (1): 47–64. ISSN 0392-3495.
- Lemprière, John (1808). "CRASSO, Lawrence". Universal Biography of Eminent Persons in all Ages and Countries. London: T. Cadell and W. Davies.
- Joseph-François Michaud, Louis-Gabriel Michaud (1842). "Crasso (Laurent)". Biographie universelle, ancienne et moderne (in French). Vol. 9. Paris: Delagrave. p. 447.
