= Cyane =

Naiad in Greek mythology

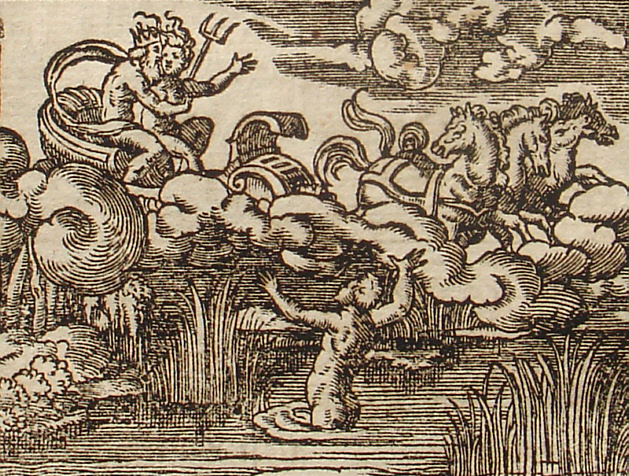
Cyane dissolves in tears, an engraving (1581) by Virgil Solis to illustrate Ovid's tale.

Cyane (/ˈsaɪəniː/; from Ancient Greek: Κυάνη, romanized: Kuánē, lit. 'dark blue'), sometimes anglicized as Kyane, is a nymph from Sicily in Greek mythology who tried to prevent Hades from abducting Persephone, her playmate. Her story is included in Ovid's famous poem the Metamorphoses.

== Family ==
Cyane's parentage is not disclosed in surviving accounts. She had as a partner the river-god Anapus, and were both honoured in Sicily with images depicting them with human forms. She cited their love as an example of consensual relationship while trying to convince Hades not to take Persephone by force.

== Mythology ==
According to Ovid, Cyane was a Sicilian nymph after whom a pool was named and a playmate of Persephone, the daughter of Zeus and Demeter. When Hades burst through the earth and snatched Persephone, Cyane tried to block his way and shouted that he could not become the girl's groom by force. Hades however ignored her, and disappeared back into the earth with Persephone. Cyane cried bitterly for Persephone and dissolved into her own tears, mixing with the waters of the pool. Persephone's mother Demeter soon began looking for her lost child, and arrived at Cyane's pool. Though Cyane had no tongue or mouth to inform Demeter of what had transpired, she made Persephone's girdle rise to the surface so Demeter might know that her daughter had been stolen away.

According to Diodorus Siculus meanwhile, Hades' abduction of Persephone near Syracuse caused a fresh spring to gush forth, which was thereafter called Cyane or Azure Fount, sacred to the maiden goddess.

== Interpretation ==
In the ancient Greek world the nymph represented a particular aspect of nature. Arethusa, a spring nymph like Cyane, is associated with a spring and pool in Syracuse; Cyane is said to dwell in a river bearing her name in southeastern Sicily.

== See also ==
- List of Greek deities
- Rhodopis
- Comaetho
