= Anapus =

River god worshiped at ancient Syracuse

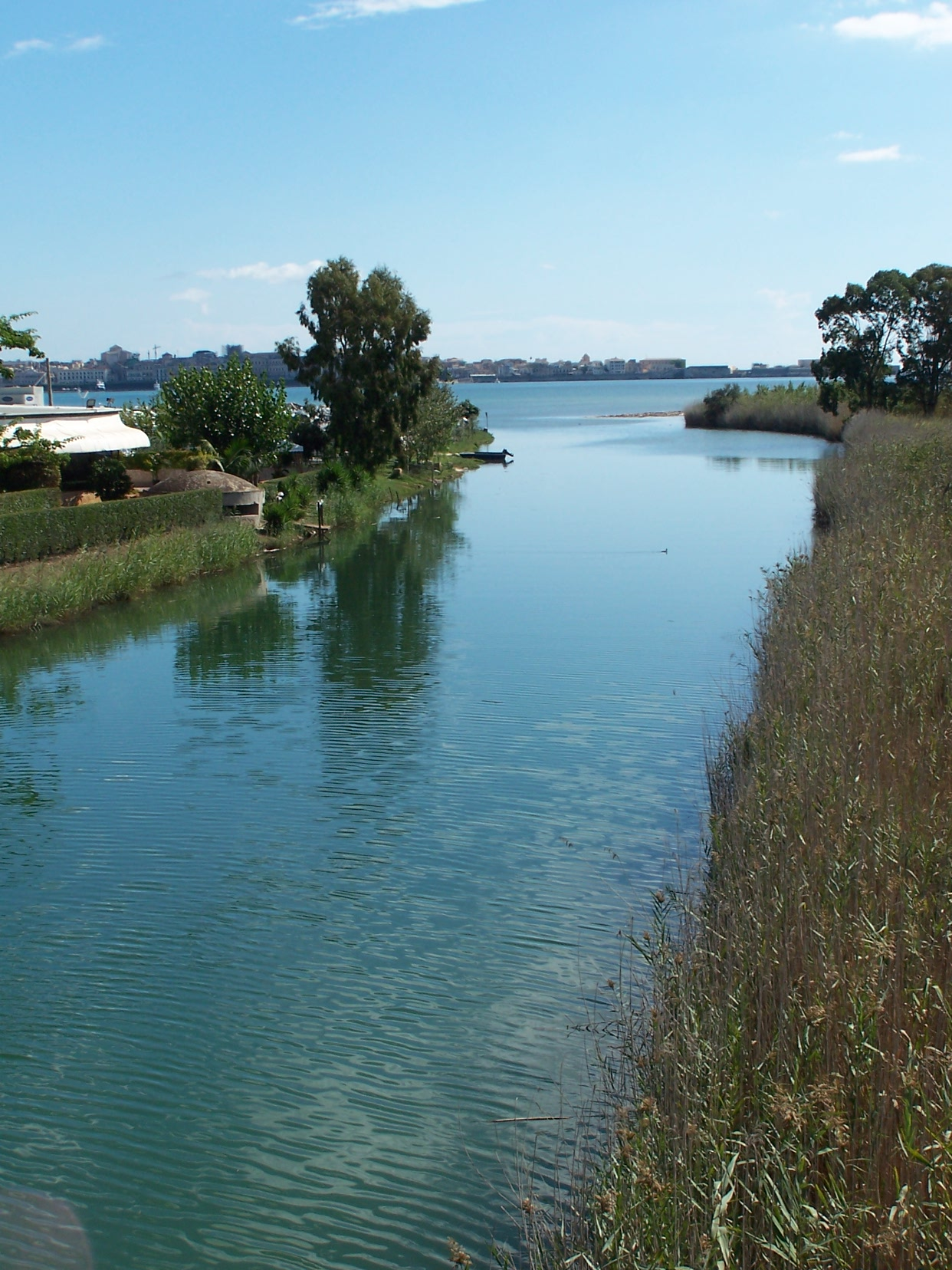

In Greek mythology, Anapus (Ancient Greek: Αναπος) was god of the river Anapus in eastern Sicily. He was worshiped by the Syracusans, who depicted him as a young man. Anapus was husband to the naiad Cyane, who attempted to dissuade Hades from abducting Persephone, describing how she consented to Anapus' wooing out of love, rather than force.

== Bibliography ==
- Publius Ovidius Naso (Ovid), Metamorphoses.
- Claudius Aelianus (Aelian), Varia Historia (Historical Miscellany).
- Dictionary of Greek and Roman Geography, William Smith, ed., Little, Brown and Company, Boston (1854).
