= Giovanni Vincenzo Imperiale =

Italian Baroque poet (1582–1648)

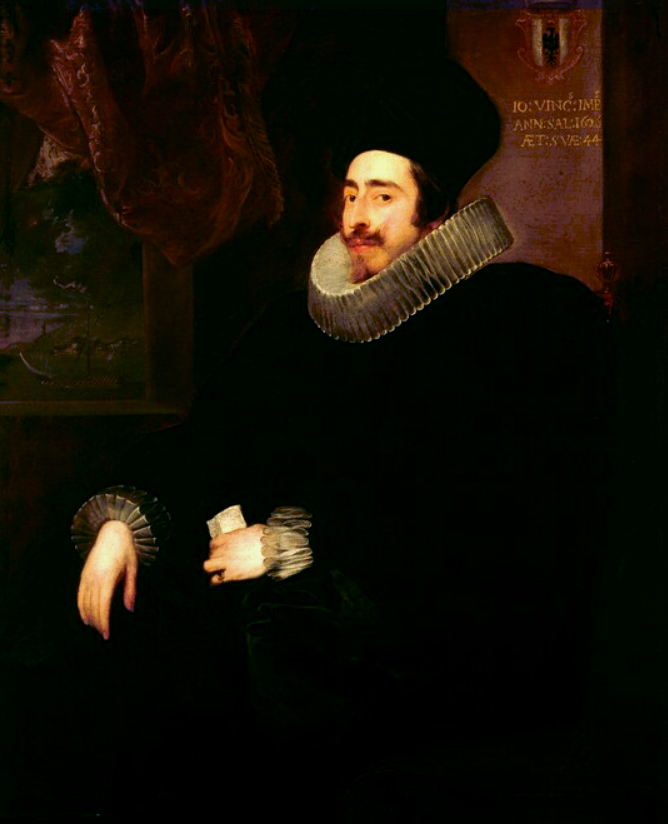
- Anthony van Dyck: Portrait of Giovanni Vincenzo Imperiale, 1626, oil on canvas, National Gallery of Art, Washington, D.C.
- Born: 1582; Sampierdarena, Genoa, Republic of Genoa
- Died: 21 June 1648 (aged 65–66); Genoa, Republic of Genoa
- Occupations: Poet; Intellectual; Civil Servant
- Spouses: Caterina Grimaldi (m. 1604; died 1618) Brigida Spinola (m. 1621)
- Children: 7
- Family: Imperiali family
- Writing career
- Language: Italian language
- Period: 17th century; Baroque literature
- Genres: Poetry
- Notable work: Lo stato rustico
- Literary movement: Late Renaissance; Baroque

Giovanni Vincenzo Imperiale (1582 – 21 June 1648) was an Italian nobleman, art collector, and man of letters.

== Biography ==
Giovanni Vincenzo Imperiale was born in 1582 at Sampierdarena (a suburb of Genoa). He was the only son of eight siblings born to one of the five leading families of Genoa whose importance and wealth had been established in the 16th century. His father, Giovanni Giacomo Imperiale, was elected Doge in 1617. His mother, Bianca Spinola, was the sister of Orazio Spinola, the future archbishop of Genoa.

We have little information about his youth and cultural formation. By the age of 18 Giovanni Vincenzo was a member of the Accademia dei Mutoli and at 25 he published the poem Stato Rustico, which established his fame as a poet. He corresponded with other celebrated poets of his age such as Giambattista Marino. In his sprawling poem L'Adone, published in 1623, Marino makes specific reference to him: Giovanni Vincenzo appears in canto 18 as the shepherd Clizio (the protagonist of the Stato rustico) who warns Adonis of the dangers of hunting the boar and then laments his friend's death.

In his early 20s, Giovanni Vincenzo was admitted to the prestigious Accademia degli Addormentati, whose members included Gabriello Chiabrera, Angelo Grillo and Ansaldo Cebà. In November 1604, he married Caterina Grimaldi, a member of another prestigious Genoese family. Marino celebrated the marriage in the epithalamium Urania. Caterina died on 17 January 1618 while giving birth to the couple's second son. After her death, Imperiale married Marchesa Brigida Spinola Doria (1583-1660).

Imperiale held various public offices. His political and military career began in 1616, when, through the influence of his father, he was named ambassador to the Duke of Mantua. In 1619 he was made admiral of the Genoese navy and in 1624 assumed the position of capitano della Polcevera, in both capacities helping defend the republic against the pillaging of pirates. He was elected senator on 10 June 1626. Giovanni Vincenzo maintained his central place in Genoese political and cultural affairs in succeeding years. He continued to serve the republic as an emissary for important political matters, particularly in Naples. Eventually, however, his growing power threatened other members of the Genoese nobility, and in June 1635 he was exiled. He took refuge first in Parma, then in Modena and finally in Bologna. He returned to Genoa in April 1638, where he lived until his death on June, 21 1648.

== Works ==
Imperiale's literary works include the ‘argomenti’ of the 1604 Genoese edition of Torquato Tasso's Jerusalem Delivered. His masterpiece is considered the didactic poem in blank verse Stato rustico (1607), which describes an imaginary journey from Genoa to Greece, where the semi-autobiographical poet-shepherd Clizio is welcomed on Mount Helicon by Apollo and the Muses. The work caught the imagination of Giambattista Marino, who introduced the character of Clizio into the first canto of his epic poem L'Adone.

== Art collection ==
Giovanni Vincenzo Imperiale was an important patron of arts. His extensive art collection numbered 325 works at the time of his death in 1648. His collection, including works by Giorgione, Correggio, Rubens, van Dyck, Palma il Giovane, Guido Reni and many others, was inherited by his son, Francesco Maria Imperiale, who tried to sell it to Charles II Gonzaga. Part of the collection was acquired in 1665 by Francesco Maria Balbi, from whom it passed to Christina, Queen of Sweden in Rome and finally to England, where it was dispersed. Today Giovanni Vincenzo's portrait by Anthony van Dyck is housed in the National Gallery of Art. Some of the works that remained in Genoa were destroyed during the French bombardment of the city in 1684 and others sold. A small number of pictures, mostly family portraits, were transferred to the Villa Imperiale at Terralba, which was acquired in the mid-17th century by Gian Giacomo Imperiale (1627–63), nephew of Gian Vincenzo.

== Bibliography ==
- López Bernasocchi, Augusta (1980). "Tradizione e innovazione in un poema del Seicento: lo Stato rustico di Gian Vincenzo Imperiale. Lettura della Parte V". Studi secenteschi. XXI: 41–107.
- Martinoni, Renato (1983). Gian Vincenzo Imperiale, politico letterato e collezionista genovese del Seicento. Padua: Antenore.
- Sopranzi, Giovanni (1988). "Le tre redazioni dello «Stato rustico» di Giovani Vincenzo Imperiali". In Renato Reichlin; Giovanni Sopranzi (eds.). Pastori barocchi fra Marino e Imperiali. Fribourg: Editions de l'Université. pp. 75–140.
- Diffley, P. (2002). "Imperiale, Gian Vincenzo". In Peter Hainsworth; David Robey (eds.). The Oxford Companion to Italian Literature. Oxford University Press. ISBN 978-0-19-818332-7.
- Pignatti, Franco; Russo, Emilio (2004). "IMPERIALE, Gian Vincenzo". Dizionario Biografico degli Italiani (in Italian). Vol. 62: Iacobiti–Labriola. Rome: Istituto dell'Enciclopedia Italiana. ISBN 978-8-81200032-6.
- Piantoni, Luca (2014). "Per lo Stato Rustico di Giovan Vincenzo Imperiale. Note stilistiche a un poema antinarrativo". Lettere Italiane. 66 (2): 247–276. JSTOR 26240843.
- Montanari, Giacomo (2020). "A matter of books: Rubens and the cultural exchange with the Genoese aristocracy: the case of Giovanni Vincenzo imperiale". Rubens e la cultura italiana: 1600-1608. Rome: Viella. pp. 217–231. ISBN 9788833136141.
