= Giuseppe Artale =

Italian Baroque writer (1628–1679)

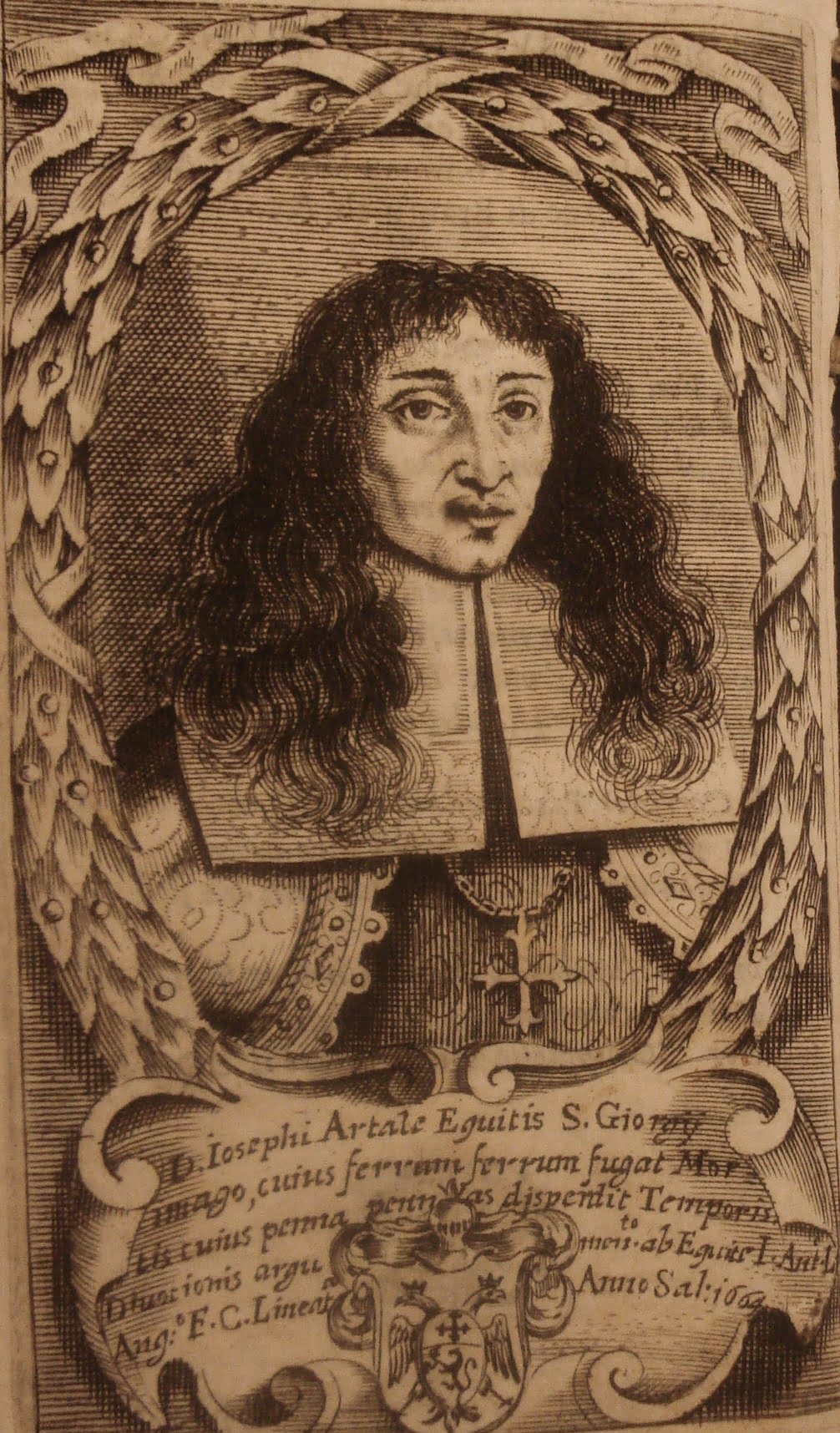
- Giuseppe Artale
- Born: 29 August 1628; Catania, Kingdom of Sicily
- Died: 11 February 1679 (aged 50); Naples, Kingdom of Naples
- Resting place: San Diego all'Ospedaletto, Naples
- Occupations: Poet; Writer; Knight
- Parent(s): Antonino Artale; Angela Artale
- Honours: Constantinian Order of Saint George
- Writing career
- Language: Italian, Latin
- Notable works: Enciclopedia Poetica; Cordimarte
- Literary movement: Baroque; Marinism

Giuseppe Artale (Catania, 29 August 1628 – Naples, 11 February 1679) was a Sicilian poet, novelist, and duelist, known for his Marinist works. He was also a knight of the Constantinian Order of Saint George.

== Biography ==
Giuseppe Artale was born at Catania, in 1628. He was descended from an ancient Aragonese family. At fifteen, he made a hurried departure from his native city, where he had killed a rival in a duel. He entered the army soon after, and rendered himself conspicuous by his bravery. For a time, he served as Captain of the Guard to the palatine Ernest of Brunswick-Lüneburg, and was highly esteemed by the emperor Leopold. He distinguished himself in the Cretan War against the Ottoman Empire, and was made a knight of the Constantinian Order of Saint George, with permission to add the imperial eagle, or Double-headed eagle, to his family arms. As a swordsman he was unrivalled, and was commonly known by the appellation of the sanguinary knight, conferred upon him for his success as a well-practised duelist. He died at Naples in 1679, worn out by excess.

Artale was a member of the principal academies of Italy, and enjoyed a considerable reputation as a poet. He is best known today for his heroic romance Cordimarte (1660), and his Enciclopedia poetica (1658-1664), recognised as the last flowering of the pessimistic vein of Neapolitan Marinism. The Enciclopedia poetica, one of the most remarkable Italian poetry collections of the Baroque period, pushes conceptismo to its most extreme forms. The Cordimarte, written in an elaborate rhetorical style, is one of the last and most conspicuous examples of Italian Baroque chivalric romance.

== Works ==
- Dell’Enciclopedia Poetica parte prima, Perugia, 1658; Venice, 1660 and 1664.
- Dell’Enciclopedia parte seconda; ovvero la Guerra fra i vivi e morti, Tragedia di lieta fine; e Il Cor di Marte, historia favoleggiata, Venice, 1660; the fifth edition was published at Naples, 1679.
- Dell'Enciclopedia parte terza; ovvero l'Alloro fruttuoso. Naples: Antonio Bulifon. 1679.
- La Pasife, ovvero L'Impossibile fatto Possibile, Dramma per Musica. Venice: Giacomo Batti. 1661.
- La Bellezza atterrata: Elegia in occasione del Contagio di Napoli, l'anno 1646. Venice: Giacomo Batti. 1661.
- Anna Maria Razzoli Roio, ed. (1990). Guerra tra vivi e morti. Tragedia di lieto fine. Parma: Università di Parma, Istituto di Filologia Moderna.
- Marzio Pieri, ed. (1990). Il Cordimarte. Parma: Università di Parma, Istituto di Filologia Moderna.

== Bibliography ==
- Slawinski, M. (2002). "Artale, Giuseppe". In Peter Hainsworth; David Robey (eds.). The Oxford Companion to Italian Literature. Oxford University Press. ISBN 978-0-19-818332-7.
- Jones, John Winter (1843). "Artale, Giuseppe". The Biographical Dictionary of the Society for the Diffusion of Useful Knowledge. Vol. 3. London: Longman, Brown, Green, and Longmans. p. 678. This article incorporates text from this source, which is in the public domain.
- Mazzuchelli, Giammaria (1753). "ARTALE (Giuseppe)". Gli scrittori d'Italia, cioè Notizie storiche e critiche intorno alle vite e agli scritti dei letterati italiani (in Italian). Vol. I, part 2. Brescia: Giambatista Bossini. pp. 1143–1144.
- Croce, Benedetto (1911). Saggi sulla letteratura italiana del '600. Bari. pp. 422, 427, 428, 430.
- Interligi, Gesualdo (1921). Studio su Giuseppe Artale, poeta, drammaturgo, romanziere del secolo XVIII. Catania.
- Croce, Benedetto (1929). Storia dell'età barocca in Italia. Bari. pp. 432–33.
- Prota-Giurleo, Ulisse (1955). "Il cavalier Artale". Il Fuidoro. II (3–4).
- Croce, Franco (1960). "Tre lirici dell'ultimo barocco. I. Giuseppe Artale". La Rassegna della Letteratura Italiana. LXV (3): 393–417.
- Croce, Franco (1962). "ARTALE, Giuseppe". Dizionario Biografico degli Italiani (in Italian). Vol. 4: Arconati–Bacaredda. Rome: Istituto dell'Enciclopedia Italiana. OCLC 883370.
- Battafarano, Italo Michele (1985). ""Epitaffio per se stesso" "Grabschrift / so er ihm macht": Giuseppe Artale und Paul Fleming oder die Poesie als Vanitas und als Transzendenz". Germanisch-Romanische Monatsschrift. 35 (1): 13–26.
- Alfieri, Gabriella; Spampinato Beretta, Margherita (1994). "The Linguistic and Literary Tradition of Sicily". Journal of Mediterranean Studies. 4 (1): 3–15.
- Distaso, Grazia (2006). "Una sperimentazione di lieto fine: la "Guerra tra vivi e morti" di Giuseppe Artale". Studi letteratura italiana per Vitilio Masiello. Bari: Laterza: 785–96.
- Vazzoler, Franco (2016). "La Guerra tra vivi e morti di Giuseppe Artale: una sperimentazione drammaturgica italiana e le Semiramidi spagnole di Cristóbal de Virués e Calderón". Comedia nueva e le scene italiane nel Seicento: trame, drammaturgie, contesti a confronto. Florence: Leo S. Olschki. pp. 147–160. doi:10.1400/249745.
