= Angelo Grillo =

Italian Baroque poet (1557–1629)

Dom Angelo Grillo OSB
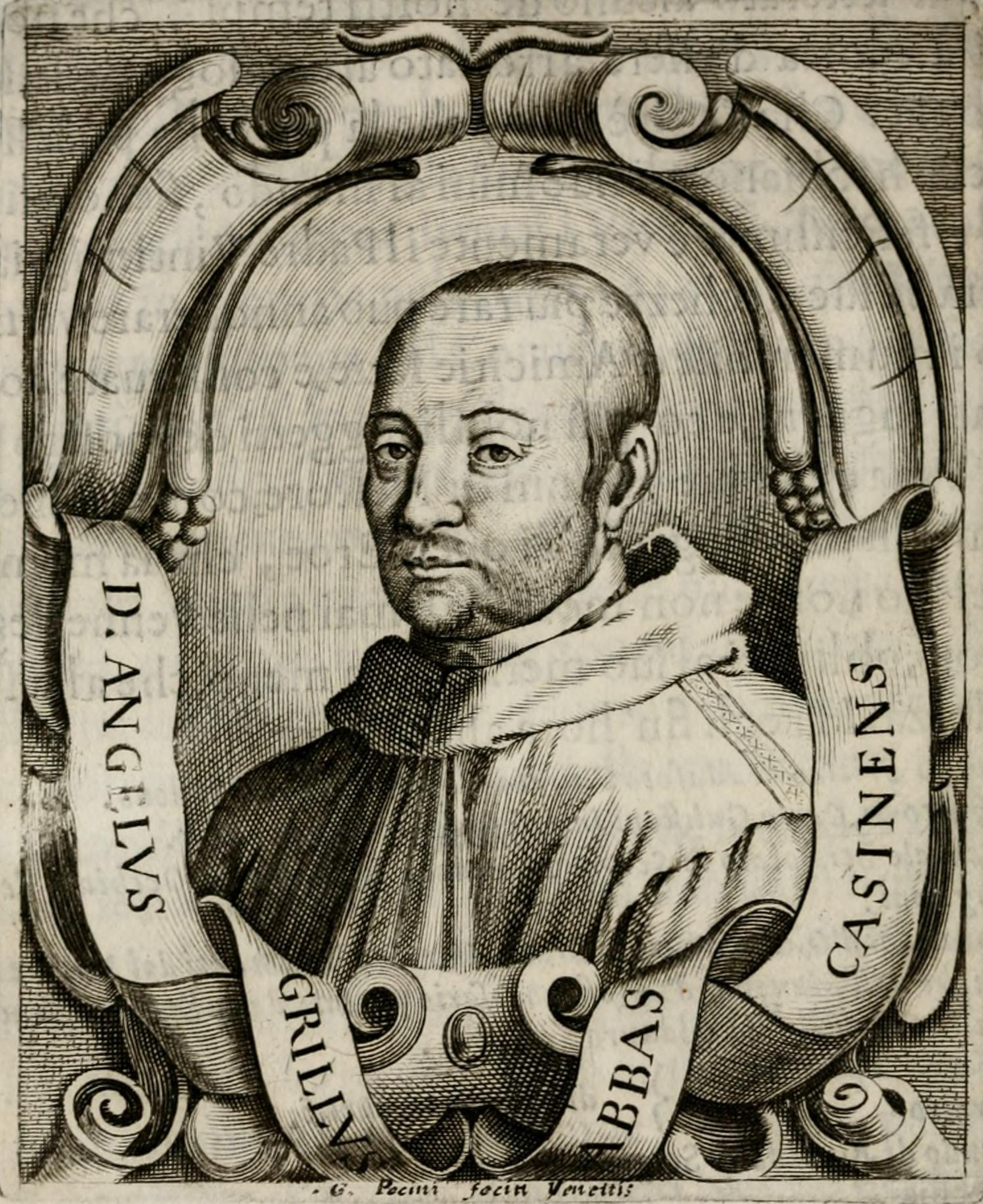
- Engraved portrait of Angelo Grillo from the book Le glorie de gli incogniti, Venice, Francesco Valvasense, 1647
- Title: abbot

Personal life
- Born: Vincenzo Grillo; 1557 Genoa, Republic of Genoa
- Died: October 1629 (aged 71–72) Parma, Duchy of Parma
- Parent(s): Nicolò Grillo and Barbara Grillo (née Spinola)
- Known for: Pietosi affetti
- Other name: Livio Celiano
- Occupation: Poet; Christian monk

Religious life
- Religion: Roman Catholicism
- Order: Benedictines
- Ordination: 14 September 1572

Dom Angelo Grillo OSB (1557 – October 1629) was an Italian early Baroque poet belonging to the noble Genoese family of the Spinola. He wrote mostly religious verse under his own name, but as Livio Celiano, his pseudonym, he wrote amorous madrigal texts.

== Biography ==
Born in 1557 to a wealthy Genovese family, Grillo took Benedictine orders as a teenager in 1572. He rose to be abbot of several, including Saint Paul Outside the Walls in Rome, where he was one of the founding members of the Accademia degli Umoristi. Monastic rules did not prevent him from taking full part in the literary life of the day. Grillo's religious poems began appearing in anthologies in 1585, and he published his first single-authored collection of Rime in 1589. A prolific writer, he published several other collections; in 1595, his Pietosi affetti, his masterwork, appeared for the first time. He reworked and expanded the collection, and it was published eleven times by its arrival at a final version, a corpus of more than two thousand poems, in 1629. He died that same year.

== Impact and legacy ==
Grillo was one of the most highly regarded poets of his generation. Between 1587 and 1613, twenty editions of his poetry appeared, a record for a poet of that time. His verse hovers between Petrarchism and conceptismo, with substantial debts to Torquato Tasso. Grillo was an important and innovative letter writer as well as a poet. His Lettere, published in several editions after his death, contain correspondence with most of the major writers of the day and give a detailed and lively picture of contemporary literary life. Beginning in 1584, Grillo maintained an epistolary correspondence with Torquato Tasso, then imprisoned in Sant'Anna; Tasso dedicated several works to him, including the Discorso dell'arte del dialogo of 1585. Marino knew Grillo's poetry and utilised some of his religious themes.

Much of his verse was especially designed for musical settings. His madrigal texts were set by Monteverdi, Filippo Bonaffino, Orazio Vecchi, Luca Marenzio, Giuliano Paratico, Salamone Rossi, Pomponio Nenna and others. The close relationship between Grillo and Monteverdi appears in their correspondence, which began about 1610 and continued until the poet's death in 1629. Grillo's letters to Giulio Caccini, to Caccini's daughters, Francesca and Settimia, who were both musicians, to Monteverdi, to the poets Rinuccini and Chiabrera, to Giovanni Matteo Bembo, throw most interesting and revealing sidelights on the relationships of poets and musicians.

== Works ==
- Rime morali (1580 and 1599);
- Affetti pietosi (1581);
- Pompe della Morte (1599);
- Elogio di Giovanni Imperiali di doge a Genova (1618).

== Bibliography ==
- Slawinski, M. (2002). "Grillo, Angelo". The Oxford Companion to Italian Literature. Oxford University Press. ISBN 978-0-19-818332-7.
- Tosti, Luigi (1877). Torquato Tasso e i Benedettini Cassinesi. Monte Cassino: Tipografia dei benedettini.
- Raboni, Giulia (1991). "Il madrigalista genovese Livio Celiano e il benedettino Angelo Grillo". Studi secenteschi. XXXII: 137–88.
- Farro, Maria Cristina (1993). "Un libro di lettere da riscoprire: Angelo Grillo e il suo epistolario". Esperienze Letterarie. XVIII (3): 69–81.
- Ferretti, Francesco (2015). "L'ingegnoso penitente: Angelo Grillo e i Salmi penitenziali". Studi (E testi) italiani: Semestrale del Dipartimento di Italianistica e Spettacolo. 35 (1): 149–166.
- McHugh, Shannon (2020). "Devotion, Desire, and Masculinity in the Spiritual Verse of Angelo Grillo". Innovation in the Italian Counter-Reformation. University of Delaware Press. pp. 145–166. doi:10.2307/j.ctv15d81vf.10.
