= Antonio Bulifon =

French printer

- A mermaid with two intertwining tails depicted on the printer's mark of Antonio Bulifon
- Born: Antoine Bulifon; June 24, 1649; Chaponnay, Dauphiné
- Died: July 1707 (aged 58); Spain
- Occupations: Scholar, printer, publisher
- Spouse: Maddalena Criscuolo (m. 1673)
- Children: 3
- Parent(s): Laurent Bulifon and Jeanne Bulifon (née Pros)

Antonio Bulifon (24 June 1649 – July 1707) was a French printer working in Naples. As a publisher Bulifon was "fundamentally important for the diffusion of women's poetry" in Italy.

== Life ==
Antonio Bulifon was born in Chaponay in Dauphiné in southeastern France, the son of Laurent Bulifon, a notary, and his wife Jeanne Pros. In 1668 he set out on travels across France, visiting shrines in Marseille, Toulon and Aix, and continuing to Rome on hearing of the death of Pope Clement IX. In 1670 he moved to Naples, where he established a printing firm. For his printer's device he chose a Siren, perhaps a symbol for his adopted city, and the motto “non sempre nuoce” (“she does not always harm”). As a printer Bulifon specialized in travel books, histories of the city, and sixteenth-century lyric poetry. He republished the fairy tales of Giambattista Basile.

Bulifon's wealth of contacts, coupled with his virtual monopoly on the sale of foreign journals and books in Naples, transformed his bookshop into the primary conduit through which information and texts flowed freely in and out of the city. Not surprisingly, Bulifon's bottega became a gathering place for Neapolitan intellectuals including Giuseppe Artale, Francesco D'Andrea, Niccolò Toppi, Pompeo Sarnelli, Giovanni Vincenzo Gravina and Carlo Celano. The centrality of Bulifon's bookshop to Neapolitan intellectual life led foreign visitors from France, Germany, Switzerland, and England to his door. His shop became a mandatory stop for anyone traveling to Naples, as satisfied customers returned home and began to advertise his services. For example, after a trip to Naples in 1688, the author of Nouveau voyage d'Italie (1691), Maximilien Misson, described the printer as follows: “Mr. Bulifon, a bookseller, a native of France, but established for a long time in Naples, is not only clever in his trade, but knows an infinity of things, is the author of many good books and an exceedingly honorable man. He is extremely courteous to travelers and always ready to offer them his good offices”.

Bulifon gave particularly noteworthy attention to women's work. He republished the poetry of Vittoria Colonna in 1692 and 1693. Between 1692 and 1694 he also published the poems of Laura Terracina, Lucrezia Marinella, Veronica Gambara, Isabella Morra, Maria Selvaggia Borghini, Tullia d'Aragona, Laura Battiferri and Isabella Andreini, as well an anthology of fifty women poets.

Around the start of the 18th century Bulifon turned his printing business over to his son Niccolo. When the Austrians invaded Naples in 1707, he fled to Spain and sought the protection of Philip V. His Naples bookshop was attacked and destroyed by a mob, and he died later that year.

== Works ==
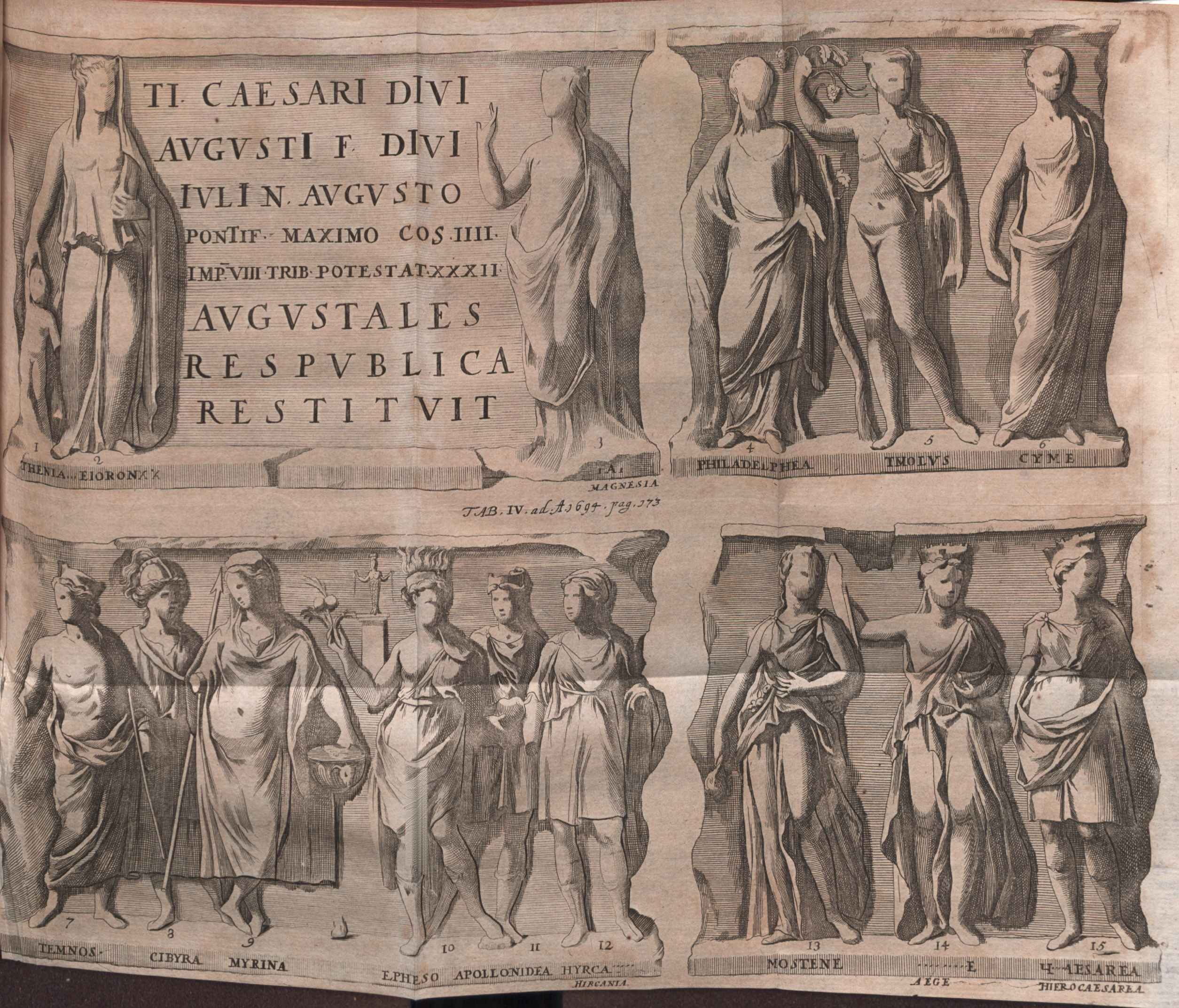
Particular from the review of Bulifon's Ragionamento intorno d'un antico marmo discoverto nella città di Pozzuoli published on Acta Eruditorum, 1694

- Bulifon, Antonio (1683). Dell'origine della guerra di Ungaria, dell'assedio di Vienna; e delle vittorie ottenute dall'esercito cristiano. Naples.
- Ludovico Marracci (1684). Antonio Bulifon (ed.). Descrizione dello stendardo regale del Gran Turco inviato dal re di Pollonia Giovanni III al sommo Pontefice Innocenzio XI. Con la sposizione delle parole arabiche, ivi tessute, all'eminentiss. e reverendiss signor cardinal Vincenzo-Maria Orsini. Naples: Giuseppe Roselli.
- Compendio delle vite de i re di Napoli con li ritratti al naturale. Raccolte da Antonio Bulifon. Naples: Per il Castaldo R. Stamp. 1688.
- Sarnelli, Pompeo (1690). Cronicamerone overo Annali, e giornali historici delle cose notabili accadute nella città, e Regno di Napoli, dalla natività di N.S. sino all'anno 1690, scritto e di vaghe figure abellito da Antonio Bulifon. Naples.
- Bulifon, Antonio (1692). Accuratissima e nuova delineazione del Regno di Napoli con le sue provincie distinte, nuovamente date in luce da Antonio Bulifon, e da lui presentate al sommo merito dell'Altezza Serenissima di Cosmo III Gran Duca di Toscana. Naples.
- Compendio istorico degl'incendi del monte Vesuvio: fino all'ultima eruzione accaduta nel mese di giugno 1698. Naples. 1701.
- Altra lettera scritta da Antonio Bulifon a un suo amico, nella quale gli dà ragguaglio della seconda cavalcata fatta in Napoli per la solenne entrata dell'eminentiss. sig. Cardinal Carlo Barberini, mandato da Sua Santità in qualità di suo Legato a latere a Filippo V monarca delle Spagne. Naples: Felice Mosca. 1702.
- Antonio Bulifon; Niccolò Bulifon (1703). Giornale del viaggio d'Italia dell'invittissimo, e gloriosissimo monarca Filippo V re delle Spagne, e di Napoli, &c. Nel quale si da ragguaglio delle cose dalla M.S. in Italia adoperate dal di XVI d'Aprile, nel quale approdò in Napoli, infin'al di XVI di Novembre 1702. In cui s'imbarcò in Genova, per far ritorno in Ispagna. Naples: Niccolò Bulifon.

== Works published by Bulifon ==
- Lo cunto de li cunti by Giambattista Basile, ed. Pompeo Sarnelli. Naples, 1674.
- Guida de forestieri: curiosi di vedere, e d'intendere le cose più notabili della regal cittá di Napoli, e del suo amenissimo distretto by Pompeo Sarnelli. Naples, 1683.
- Rime di M. Vittoria Colonna d'Avalo. Naples, 1692.
