= Form (architecture) =

Shape and/or configuration of a building

In architecture, form refers to a combination of external appearance, internal structure, and the unity of the design as a whole, an order created by the architect using space and mass.

== Appearance ==
Irregular shapes at the Berliner Philharmonie

The external outline of a building includes its shape, size, color, and texture, as well as relational properties, like position, orientation, and visual inertia (appearance of concentration and stability).

Architects are primarily concerned with the shapes of the building itself (contours, silhouettes), its openings (doors and windows), and enclosing planes (floor, walls, ceiling).

Forms can have regular shape (stable, usually with an axis or plane of symmetry, like a triangle or pyramid), or irregular; the latter can sometimes be constructed by combining multiple forms (additive forms, composition) or removing one form from another (subtractive forms).

Multiple forms can be organized in different ways:

- in a line or along a circle;
- as a regular grid;
- as an irregular cluster;
- in a star-like radial pattern.

== Structure ==
From the architectural standpoint, the structure is what keeps the architectural construction as a solid body. It is a set of bulky objects that are pervasive throughout the building and thus are closely related to its shape. Historically, a form was expected to seamlessly and elegantly combine the artistic expression and physical reality in "a meeting of art and science through design".

Multiple approaches were suggested to address the reflection of the structure in the appearance of the architectural form. In the 19th-century Germany, Karl Friedrich Schinkel suggested that the structural elements shall remain visible in the forms to create a satisfying feeling of strength and security, while Karl Bötticher as part of his "tectonics" suggested splitting the design into a structural "core-form" (German: Kernform) and decorative "art-form" (German: Kunstform). Art-form was supposed to reflect the functionality of the core-form: for example, rounding and tapering of the column should suggest its load-bearing function. In the tectonics as envisioned by Bötticher, the function (defined as requirements for internal space) had driven the design: the size determined the roof technology to be used, the latter in turn mandated the support requirements, creating a structural outline of the building, architecture was an art of resolution of the conflicts between the functional need and architectural forms that can be built.

New materials had frequently inspired new forms. For example, the arrival of construction iron essentially created a set of new core-forms, and many architects got busy inventing the matching art-forms. Similarly, introduction of reinforced concrete, steel frame, and large plates of sheet glass in the 20th century caused creation of radically new space and mass arrangements. The properties of these materials enabled the Modern architecture to create a novel visual vocabulary that showcased the technology.

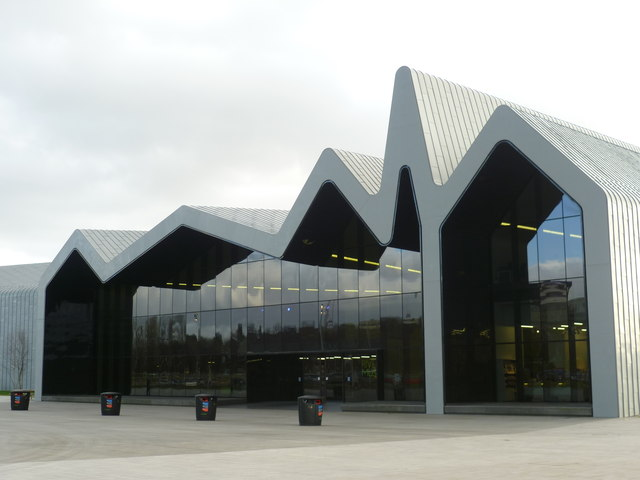
Riverside Museum, Glasgow

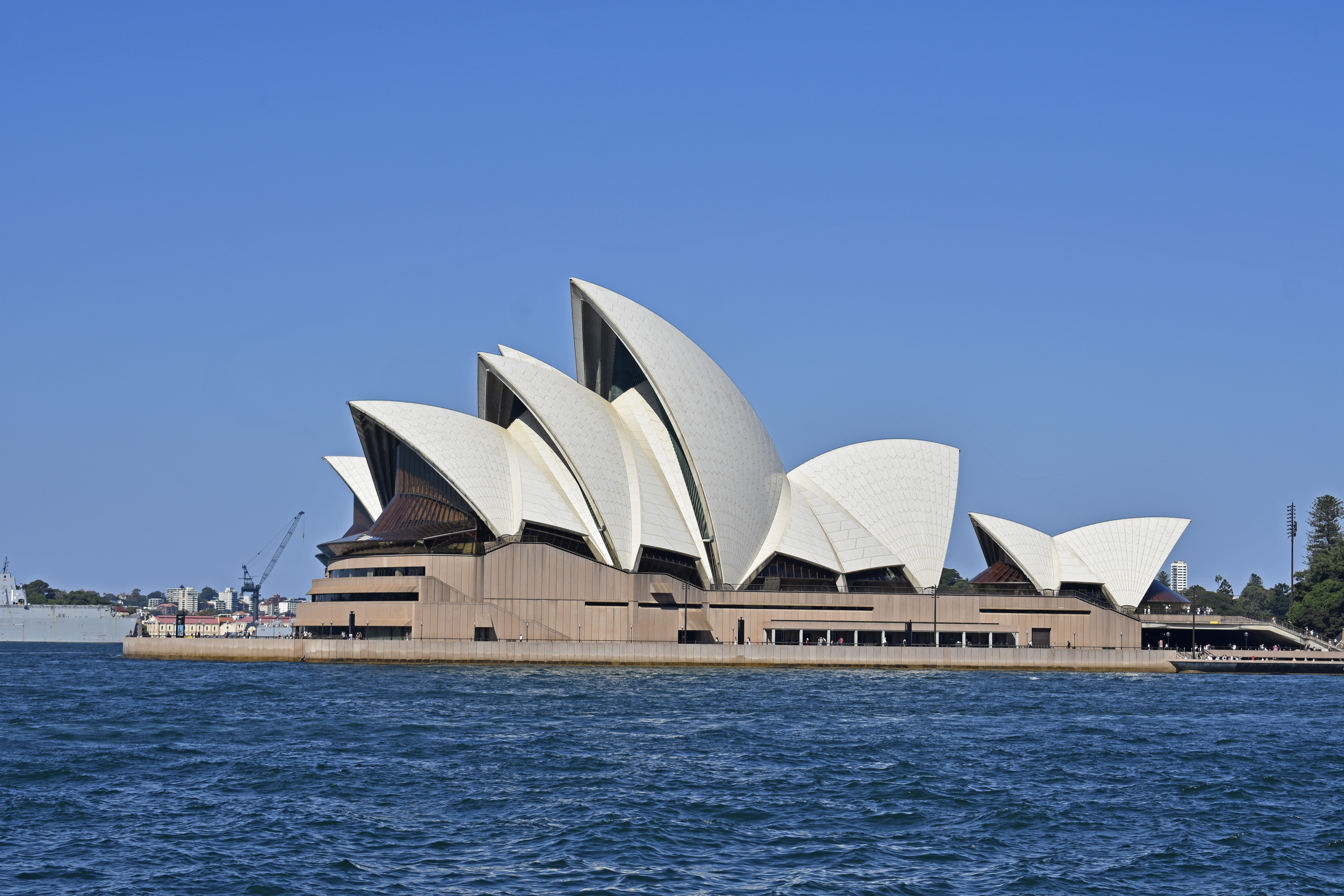
Sydney Opera House

The shape of a form can make support structure for it more or less "efficient". Efficiency can be defined either as a ratio of the construction material used to the structural load supported, or as a minimal total cost of the building. Generally, a form that creates primarily compressive and tensile forces (as opposed to bending) in its support structure, requires significantly less material. On the cost side, this is balanced against the simplicity of the construction: for example, in the industrialized societies, with high-wage economies, the construction is dominated by material-inefficient, but low-cost beam and post (steel frame or concrete frame) structures. Thin concrete shell forms are remarkably efficient and aesthetically pleasing (cf. Riverside Museum or L'Oceanogràfic). However, some architects viewed concrete shells as a license to experiment with the arbitrary curvilinear shapes, producing few technically disastrous (although frequently iconic) buildings like the Sydney Opera House, where the visually appealing sail-like roof turned out impossible to build as designed and now hides a very heavy (and expensive) reinforced concrete networks actually carrying the load.

== Space and mass ==
Space and mass (also mass and volume) are the primary ingredients that an architect uses to compose an architectural form. The essence of a building is the separation between the finite indoor space fit for humans and unrestricted natural environment outdoors. Unlike the physical objects manifesting the mass (for example, the floor, walls, and ceiling), the human experience of the void, air-filled indoor space is not obvious, yet the idea of architectural space is very old, going back at least to the Ancient Greek: τάξις (táxis, "order"), a subdivision of a building into parts.

The psychological effects of space are very common, as suggested by the English language: feeling of insecurity and compression in "confining circumstances" of inadequate space and powerful "elevated experience" of standing above a great expanse. Space and mass in architecture are not entirely separable: as was noted by George Berkeley in 1709, two-dimensional human vision cannot fully comprehend three-dimensional forms, so the perception of the space is a result of immediate visual sensation and the knowledge of textures pre-acquired through touching (this idea evolved in the 19th century into a theory of apperception).

By placing restrictions on the observer's movements, an architect can evoke a variety of emotions. For example, in Gothic architecture, an elongated nave suggests a forward movement towards the altar while the compressive effect of tall walls draws the gaze towards vaults and windows above, causing a feeling of release and "uplifting" experience. Renaissance architecture tries to guide the observer to a point where all the features appear to be in equilibrium, resolving the conflict between the compression and release, thus creating a feeling of being at rest. Neo-Palladianism in England paid attention to the architectural circulation, with the views unfolding as the visitor experiences the building.

The architectural use of space is not restricted to indoors, similar feelings can be recreated on a grand scale in the city landscape. For example, the colonnades of the St. Peter's Square in Rome suggest walking towards the entrance of the cathedral in a way similar to the navigation experiences indoors. At the same time, the facades of a standalone building usually do not create an architectural space, instead the outside of a building can be thought of as a kind of sculpture, with the masses arranged in a large void.

The balance between the space and mass varied with the historical period and function of the building. For example, Egyptian pyramids and stupas in India have practically no internal space, are almost all mass, and thus manifest themselves in a sculptural fashion. The Byzantine architecture, in contrast, offered in its churches an ascetic shell outside combined with sophisticated indoor spaces. Gothic cathedrals expressed the fusion between the secular and spiritual powers through an equilibrium between the worldly facade masses and mystic spaces inside. The relative importance of space and mass can change very quickly: in 1872, Viollet-le-Duc wrote his book, Entretiens sur l'architecture, completely avoiding the use of the word "space" in its modern meaning; just 20 years later August Schmarsow was declaring the primacy of German: Raumgestaltung, "forming the space".

Modern architecture, utilizing the steel frame, enabled space partitioning without any practical limits, transparent walls of architectural glass enable visual journeys into the boundless world behind them. At the same time modern materials reduced the contrast between the space and mass, primarily through the reduced mass of the walls.

== Symbolism ==
The form can be considered to have a direct symbolic value used for communication between the architect and the customer. In particular, most art historians agree that the triangular pediment in the Greco-Roman architecture is not just an imitation of an older roof construction, but a representation of the divine. This idea, first presented in the modern times by a little-known (except for his theories) architect Jean-Louis Viel de Saint-Maux in 1787, was hinted at by Cicero much earlier. Cicero also suggested that the utilitarian and symbolic meanings of the pediment are not necessarily contradictory: originally designed as part of the gabled roof to protect from the rain, the pediment had gradually acquired a religious value, so if a building was designed for heaven, where the rain does not fall, dignity would dictate to add a pediment on top of it.

The ability of architecture to represent the universe and the common association of a sphere with the cosmos caused an extensive use of spherical shapes since the early Roman construction (Varro's Aviary, 1st century BC).

== Theories ==
Multiple theories were suggested to explain the origination of forms. Gelernter considers them to be variations of five basic ideas:

1. A form is defined by its function ("form follows function"). For a building to be "good", it should fulfill the functional requirements imposed by external physical, social, and symbolic needs (for example, a theater should have unobstructed view of the stage from the spectators' seats). Each set of functions corresponds to an ideal form (that can be latent and still waiting for a thoughtful architect to find it);
2. A form is a product of the designer's creativity. An architect's intuition suggests a new form that eventually blossoms, this explains similarities between the buildings with disparate functions built by the same architect;
3. A form is dictated by the prevailing set of attitudes shared by the society, the Zeitgeist ("Spirit of Age"). While expressing his individuality, an architect still unconsciously reflects the artistic tastes and values that are "in the air" at the time;
4. A form is defined by the socioeconomic factors. Unlike the Spirit of Age theory, the externalities are more physical (e.g., methods of production and distribution). Architects live in a society and their works are influenced by the prevailing ideology (for example, Versailles represents societal hierarchy while Prairie buildings reflect the power of bourgeoisie);
5. Architecture forms are timeless; the good ones cross the geographical, cultural, and temporal borders. For hundreds of years, these beliefs were embodied in The Five Orders of Architecture. According to the theory of types there are only few basic building forms, like basilica or atrium, with each generating multiple versions with stylistic differences (the basilica form can be traced from Roman court buildings to Romanesque and Gothic churches, all the way to the 20th century Environmental Education Center in the Liberty State Park, New Jersey).

=== Early theories of form ===
As the nomadic cultures began to settle and desired to provide homes for their deities as well, they faced a fundamental challenge: "how would mortals ... know the kind of built environment that would please the gods?" The first answer was obvious: claim the divine origin of the architectural form, passed to architects by kings and priests. Architects, not having access to the original source, worked out the ways to scale buildings while keeping order through the use of symmetry, multiples and fractions of the basic module, proportions.

Plato discussed the ideal forms, "Platonic solids": cube, tetrahedron, octahedron, icosahedron). Per Plato, these timeless Forms can be seen by the soul in the objects of the material world; architects of latter times turned these shapes into more suitable for construction sphere, cylinder, cone, and square pyramid. The contemporaneous Greek architects, however, still assumed the divine origins of the forms of their buildings. Standard temple types with predetermined number and location of columns eventually evolved into the orders, but Greeks thought of these not as frozen in time results of the cultural evolution, but as timeless divine truths captured by mortals.

Vitruvius, in the only surviving classical antiquity treatise on the subject of architecture (c. 25 BC), acknowledges the evolutionary origination of forms by referring to the first shelters built by the primitive men, who were emulating the nature, each other, and inventing. Through this process, they had arrived to the immutable "truth of Nature". Thus, to achieve the triple goal of architecture, "firmness, commodity, and delight", an architect should select a timeless form and then adjust it for the site, use, and appearance (much later, in Positivist approach, environment and use create the form in a near-perfect opposite).

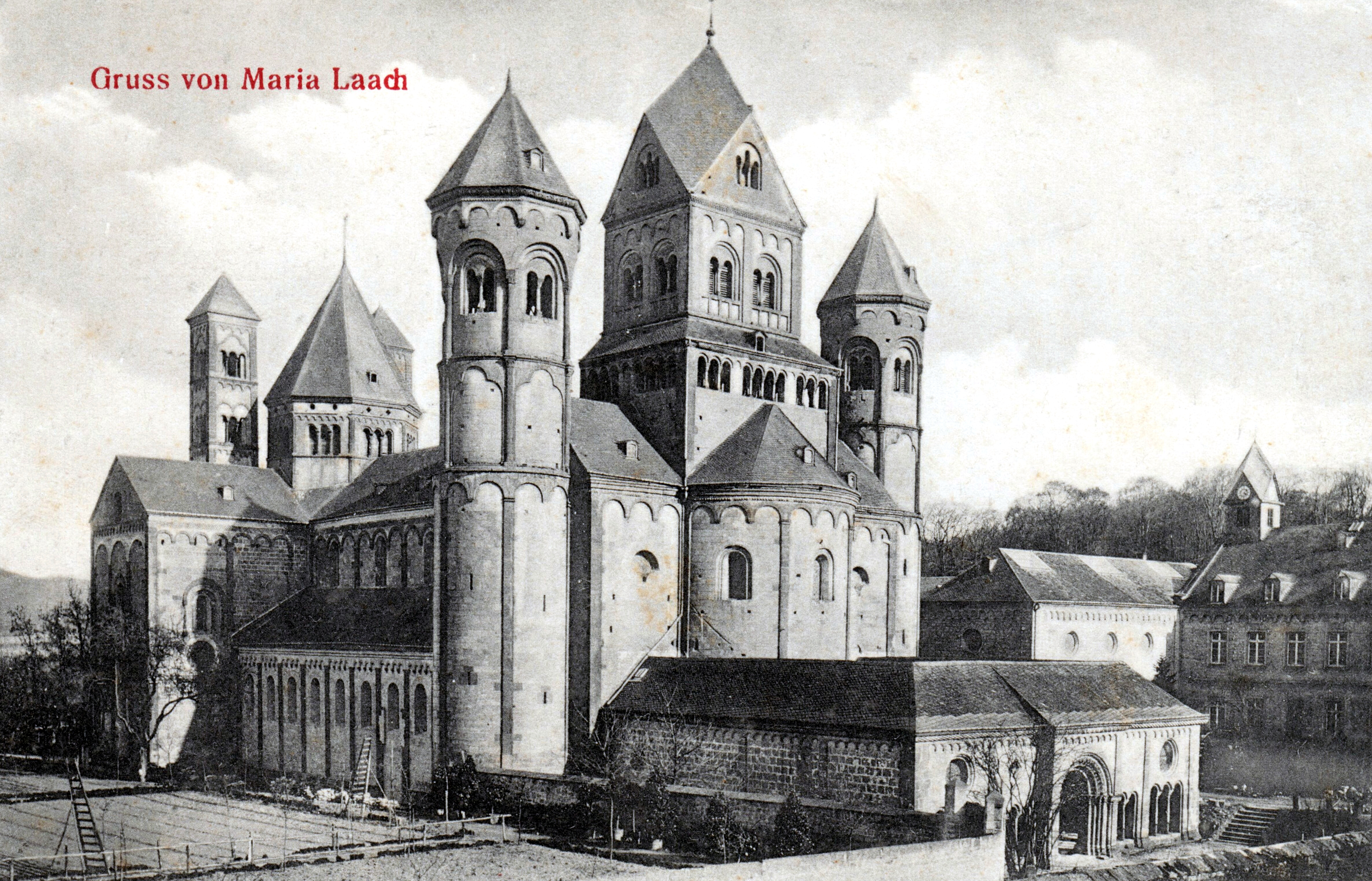
Simple geometric elements form the exterior of Maria Laach Abbey, 12th century AD

Medieval architects strived in their designs to follow the structure of universe by starting with simple geometrical figures (circles, squares, equilateral triangles) and combining them into evolved forms used for both plan and sections views of the building, expecting better structural qualities and adherence to the perceived Divine intentions.

Renaissance brought a wholesale return in architecture to the Classical ideals. While Giacomo da Vignola ("The Five Orders of Architecture", 1562) and Andrea Palladio ("I quattro libri dell'architettura", 1570) had tweaked the proportions recorded by Vitruvius, their books declared the absolute, timeless principles of the architectural design.

=== Rationalism and empiricism ===
At the end of Renaissance a view of cosmos through an "organic analogy" (comparison to a living organism) evolved into a mechanical philosophy describing the world where everything is measurable. Gelernter notes that the first manifestations of the new approach occurred much later, in the Baroque style, at the time when both the rationalism and empiricism gained prominence. The Baroque architecture reflected this duality: early Baroque (mid-17th century) can be considered a Classicism revival with forms emphasizing logic and geometry (in opposition to the Mannerism), while in the end of the 17th century Rococo style is associated with the primacy of "sensory delights".

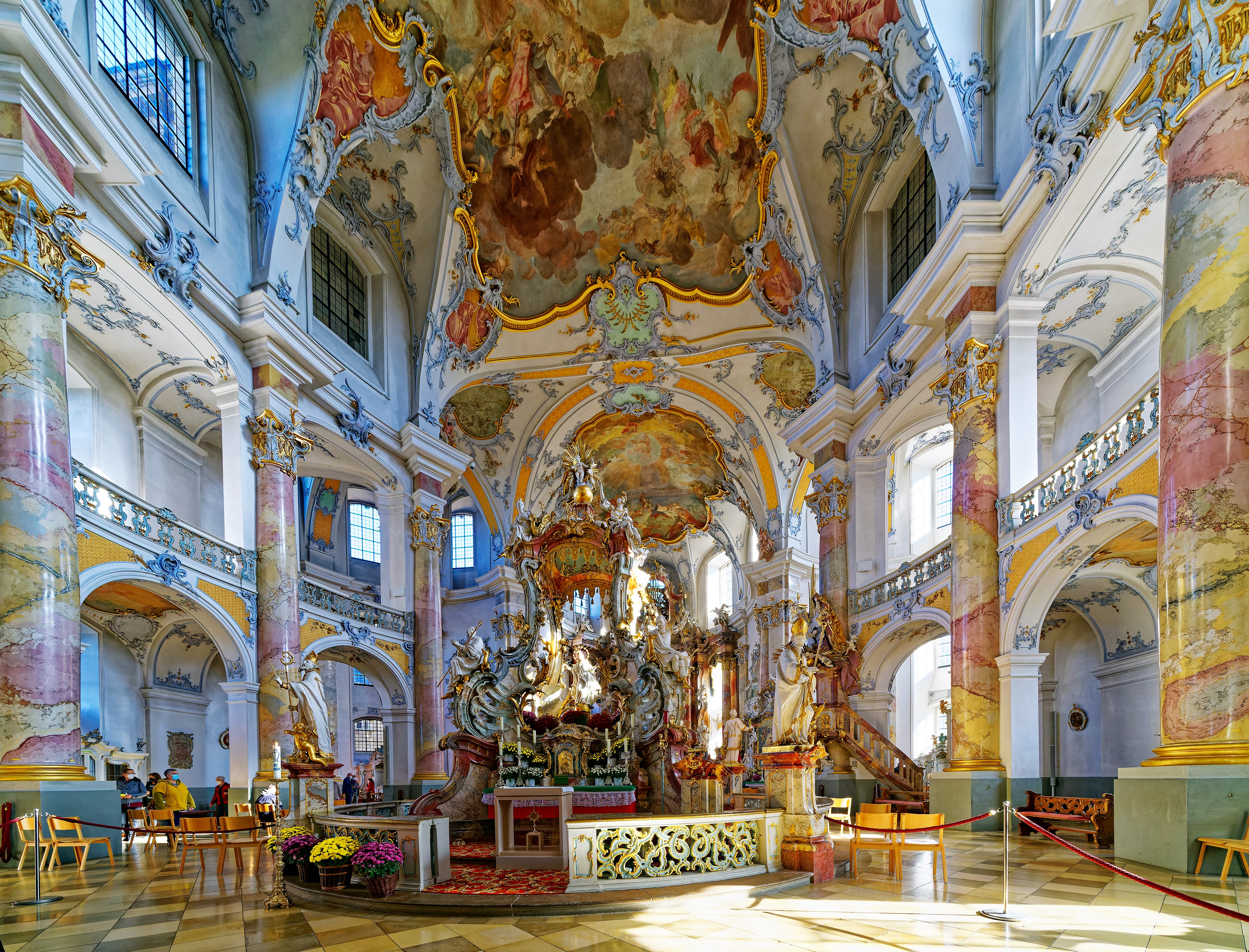
Interior of Basilica of the Fourteen Holy Helpers (Baltasar Neumann, 1743–1772)

Architects believing in logic (like François Mansart, François Blondel) expected architectural form to follow laws of nature and thus eternal. This theory stressed the importance of the architectural orders that unalterable. Gradually, a shift to empiricism occurred, most pronounced in the "quarrel of the Ancients and the Moderns", an almost 30-year long debate in French academies (1664–1694). Ancients (or "Poussinists") and Moderns (or Rubenists) were expressing rationalist and empiricist views respectively. When applied to architecture, the distinction was the use of Classical geometric forms by Ancients and sensual drama suppressing the geometrical orders in the works of Modernes (Baltasar Neumann, Jakob Prandtauer). Moderns (and Rococo) prevailed, but, taken to a logical conclusion, the pure sensory approach is based on individual perception, so effectively the beauty in architecture was no longer objective and was declared to be rooted only in customs. Claude Perrault (of the Louvre Palace facade fame) in his works freed the architectural form from both God and Nature and declared that it can be arbitrarily changed "without shocking either common sense or reason". However, asserting subjectivity caused a loss of academic vigor: art theory in the beginning of the 18th century declined, affecting art education to the point where between 1702 and 1722 nine highest student awards (Grand Prix de Rome) had to be cancelled due to absence of worthy recipients.

=== Positivism and Romanticism ===
During the era of Enlightenment, the idea of timeless and objective form was renewed as part of the Neoclassicism. Two different approaches were proposed:

- philosophy of positivism stated that architecture (like anything else) was determined by the outside factors;
- Romantic rebellion declared the primacy of geniuses and their inner emotional resources.

The earliest application of positivist thinking to the idea of architectural form belongs to a monk Carlo Lodoli (1690–1761). Lodoli's student, Francesco Algarotti, published in 1757 his mentor's phrase, "in architecture only that shall show that has a definite function," a very early forerunner of the "form follows function" maxim underlying the functionalism. Romantics were striving to bring back the organic unity of man and nature, even though an idea of nature creating the forms through an architect contradicted their cult of human genius. They latched onto Medieval period that was interpreted as a more natural age, with craftsmen building the cathedrals as individual voluntarily that accepted the requirements of the large project. Romantics started the use of Gothic forms a century before the flourishing of Gothic Revival.

The Enlightenment also ushered in the new interpretation of history that declared each historical period to be a stage of growth for the humanity with its own aesthetic criteria (cf. Johann Gottfried Herder's Volksgeist that much later evolved into the Zeitgeist). No longer was the architectural form considered timeless - or merely a whim of an architects imagination: the new approach allowed to classify architecture of each age as an equally valid set of forms, "style" (the use of the word in this sense became established by the mid-18th century).

Lodoli considered form one of the two scientific aims of the architecture, the other one being the function (thought of primarily as the structural efficiency), and stated that these goals should be unified. Form (including the structural integrity, proportions, and utility) was declared to be a result of construction materials applied toward desired goals in ways agreeing with the laws of nature.

=== Neoclassicism ===
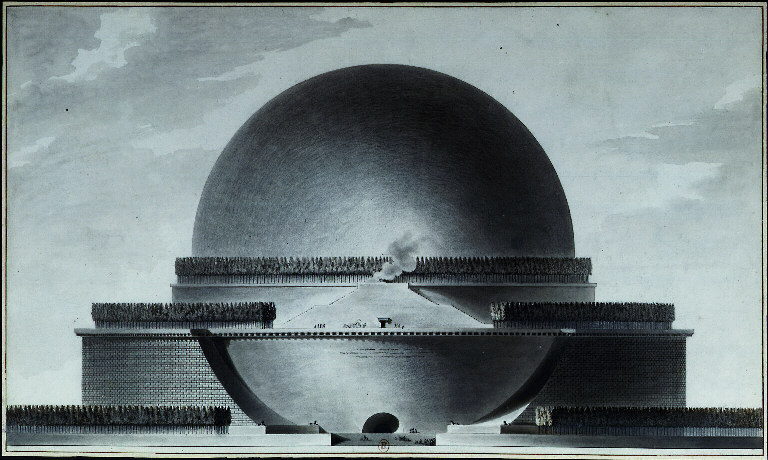
A project of the Isaac Newton's cenotaph (Étienne-Louis Boullée, 1784)

Neoclassicism declared three sources of architectural form to be valid, without an attempt to explain the contradictions:

- the beauty is derived from observation of nature and man-made objects;
- the beauty is inside the architect that tries to impress it on the world;
- the beautiful designs are the ones inspired by the Classical architecture.

In practice, neoclassicists took the third approach that was declared by Sir Joshua Reynolds to be a shortcut avoiding the "painful" germination of ideals from sensory experience. Artists were expected to imitate, not copy, while also avoiding the Romantic notions of personal expression. One of their leaders, Étienne-Louis Boullée, was preoccupied with Platonic solids, others were reviving the classicism of Palladio.

=== Eclecticism ===
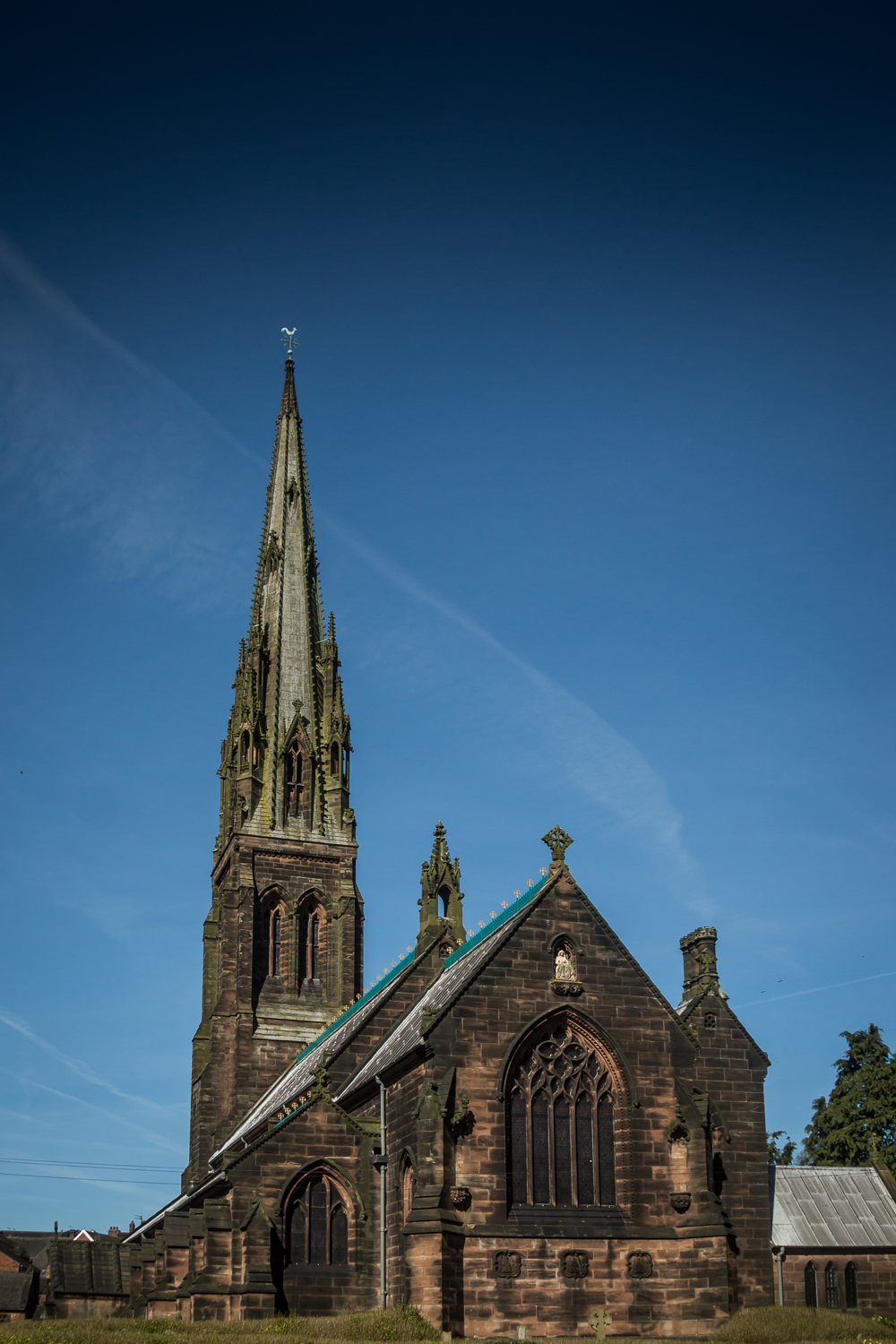
St Giles' Catholic Church, Cheadle (Augustus Pugin, 1840s)

The philosophers of the 19th century were discovering the relativism and declaring the loss of rational principles in the world. The architects could have accommodated the new ideas with creating forms unique for each architect. Instead, they mostly chose eclecticism and worked in multiple styles, sometimes grafting one onto another, and fitting the new construction techniques, like iron frame, into old forms. Few experimented with the new forms, Karl Friedrich Schinkel had discussed how an architect can create his own style, but the coherent application of the Nietzschean approach, form as a whim of its creator, will only appear a century later.

Schinkel declared that all architectural forms come from three sources: construction techniques, tradition or historical reminiscences, and nature (the latter are "meaningful by themselves"). Rudolf Wiegmann said that eclecticism with its multiplicity of transplanted forms turns the genuine art of architecture into fashion and proposed instead to concentrate on a national style (German Rundbogenstil).

=== Romanticism, Arts and Crafts ===
New generation of Romantic architects continued in the 19th century the tradition of appreciation of Middle Ages and Gothic. Augustus Pugin excelled in Gothic designs near-indistinguishable from the originals while insisting that form follows function: all features of the building should be dictated by convenience, construction, or propriety, while ornamentation's role is to highlight the construction elements. In his opinion, the pointed architecture was essentially Christian art, and the old forms are perfect, just like the faith itself; architects were expected "to follow, not to lead". Schinkel and John Nash switched from Classical to Gothic Revival and back depending on the particular project.

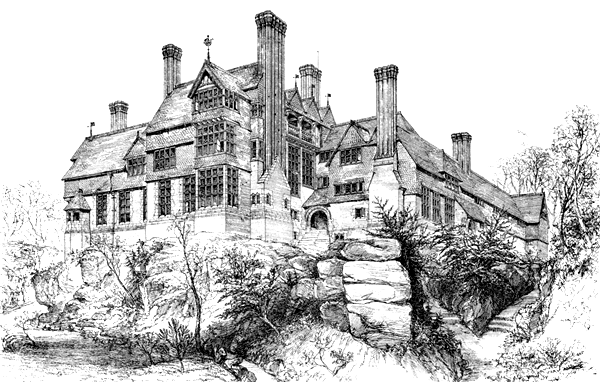
Leyswood (Richard Norman Shaw, 1868)

At the end of the 19th century William Morris, inspired by Pugin and John Ruskin, changed direction of Romanticism towards Arts and Crafts. The focus shifted towards the forms of medieval vernacular architecture with architect and builder being the same person. Following idealism of Fichte, Schelling and Hegel, the designers of Arts and Crafts movement saw their job as personal artistic expression unbounded by old traditions (cf. "Free style" of Charles Rennie Mackintosh). New forms were inspired by the properties of construction materials and craftsmanship.

=== Relativism, Empiricism ===
The end of the 19th century and the beginning of the 20th one saw the discussions between the relativist philosophers and their positivist opponents, adherents of Phenomenology and Empiricism, who found it hard to accept the impossibility of firm knowledge and thus strived to keep the notion of objective truth. Architects preferring the Classical designs with their timeless principles kept positivist views, while the Romantic ones enjoyed the phenomenological freedom of the designs unbound by any pre-conceived rules. The long tradition of Classicism was eventually finished off by Modernism in the 1920-1930s, with the last defender of the former, Julien Guadet, offering a sophisticated theory of form: the mind comes preconfigured with objective information about beauty (but this information requires discovery based on experience and practice), then modifies these innate designs according to the environment. The issue with this theory came in the early 20th century with new designs that were objectively beautiful yet retained seemingly no Classical principles, thus making the idea of prewired brain doubtful.

== Sources ==
- Ching, F.D.K. (2007). "Form". Architecture: Form, Space, and Order (PDF) (3rd ed.). Wiley. ISBN 978-0-471-75216-5.
- Frampton, Kenneth (2001). Cava, John (ed.). Studies in Tectonic Culture: The Poetics of Construction in Nineteenth and Twentieth Century Architecture. MIT Press. ISBN 978-0-262-56149-5.
- Gelernter, Mark (1995). Sources of Architectural Form: A Critical History of Western Design Theory. Manchester University Press. ISBN 978-0-7190-4129-7.
- Ferreira, Kelsey (2020-06-25). "Elements of Architecture". Open Oregon Educational Resources.
- Macdonald, Angus (2015). "Structure and Architecture: Tectonics of Form". In Kanaani, Mitra; Kopec, Dak (eds.). The Routledge Companion for Architecture Design and Practice: Established and Emerging Trends. Routledge. pp. 117–132. doi:10.4324/9781315775869-10. ISBN 978-1-138-02315-4.
- Mallgrave, H.F. (2009). Modern Architectural Theory: A Historical Survey, 1673–1968. Cambridge University Press. ISBN 978-1-139-44340-1.
- Schwarzer, Mitchell W. (1991). "The Emergence of Architectural Space: August Schmarsow's Theory of Raumgestaltung". Assemblage (15). The MIT Press: 49–61. ISSN 0889-3012. JSTOR 3171125.
- Thomas, Edmund (2007-11-15). "The Symbolic Significance of Architectural Form". Monumentality and the Roman Empire. Oxford University Press. doi:10.1093/oso/9780199288632.003.0012. ISBN 978-0-19-928863-2.
- Ungureanu, Cosmin (2016). "Viel de Saint-Maux and the Symbolism of Primitive Architecture" (PDF). Revue Roumaine d'Histoire de l'Art. Vol. LIII. pp. 129–136.
- Weston, R. (2003). Materials, Form and Architecture. Yale University Press. ISBN 978-0-300-09579-1.
