= Sargent's Garage =

- U.S. National Register of Historic Places
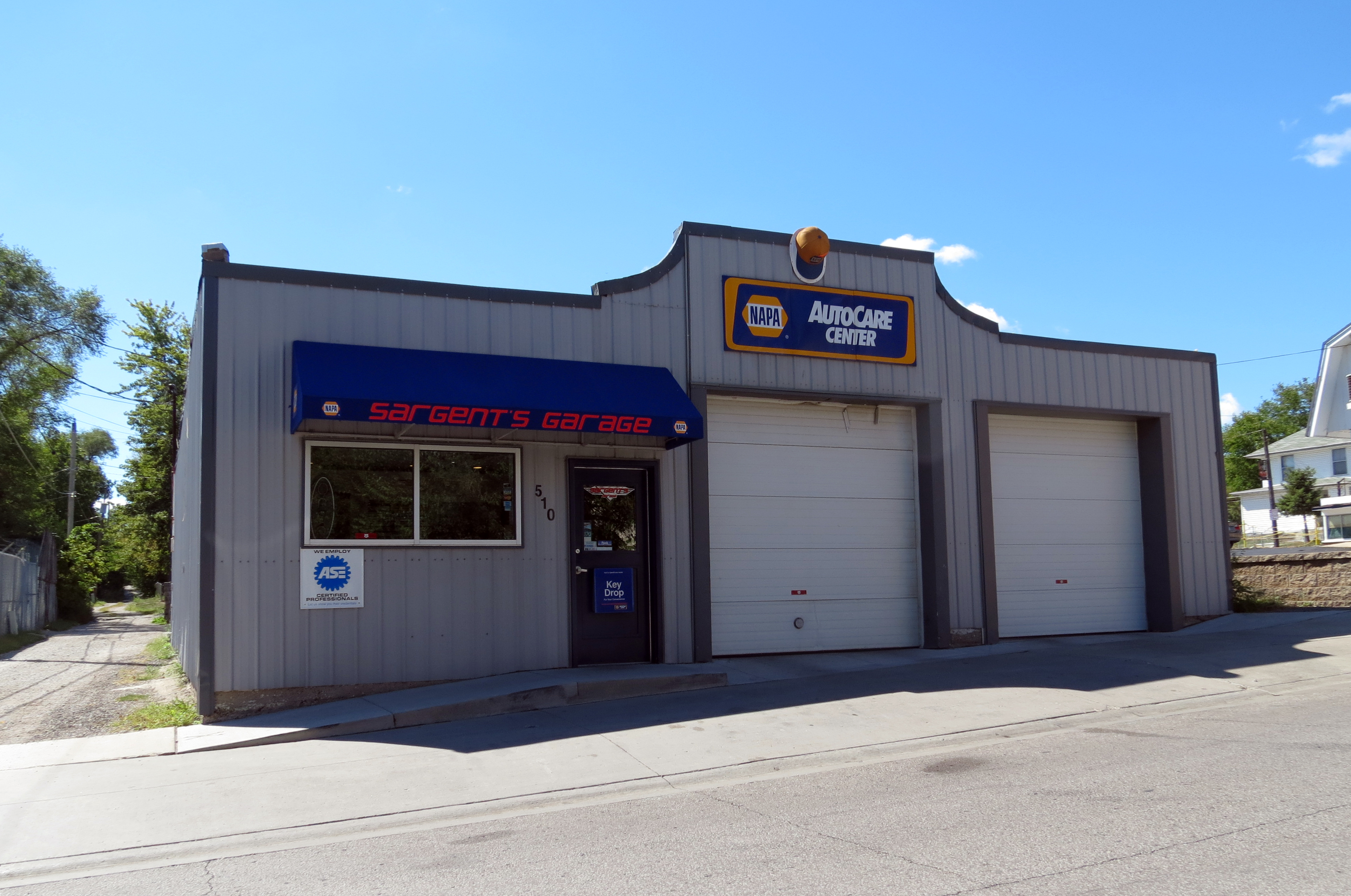

- Location within Iowa Location within the United States
- Location: 510 College Ave. Des Moines, Iowa
- Coordinates: 41°36′27.1″N 93°37′31″W
- Area: less than one acre
- Built: 1924
- MPS: Towards a Greater Des Moines MPS
- NRHP reference No.: 98001276
- Added to NRHP: October 22, 1998

Sargent's Garage, also known as the Robinson's Paint and Body Shop, Grand Spring Body and Paint Company, and Fabio's, is a historic building located in Des Moines, Iowa, United States. Completed in 1924, this single-story commercial building emplifies vernacular commercial architecture. It features a rectangular plan, wood siding now covered with metal, and a flat roof. It originally had a symmetrical facade, which has now been altered. Its significance is that it is an early automobile repair and body shop, which was a new architectural form that was emerging in early 20th-century Iowa. It continued to serve this purpose until 1997 when it suffered a minor fire. The building sat vacant for a period of time until it was renovated and reopened. It was listed on the National Register of Historic Places in 1998.
