= Castello di Reschio =

- Umbria; Near Lisciano Niccone in Italy
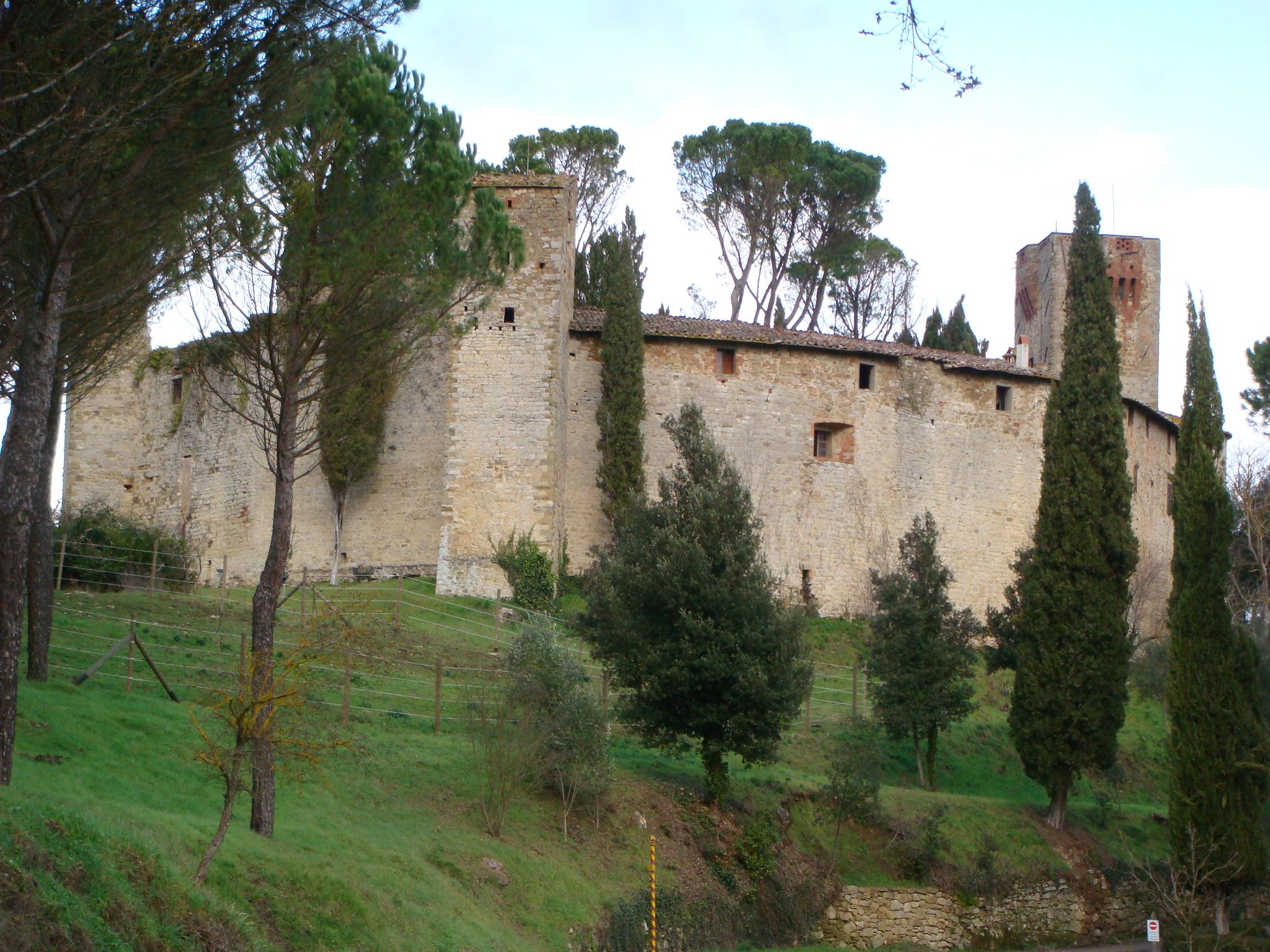
- Il castello di Reschio

Site information
- Type: Castle
- Condition: Restored

Location
- Coordinates: 43°16′32.33″N 12°11′56.12″E

Castello di Reschio forms part of a chain of walled settlements in proximity of the Tuscan boundaries. It belonged to the county of Porta Sant’Angelo of the commune of Perugia, perched on a hillock above the valley of Pierle, along the right riverbank of the Niccone stream. Today it is part of the communal territory of Lisciano Niccone, province of Perugia.

== Origins of Castle till mid-14th century ==
The name Reschio, derived from Resculum, suggests a fortification at the site dates to the late Roman Empire. The present structure was likely begun at some time between the 9th and 11th centuries. Historians from the 17th and 18th centuries (Muratori and Gamurrini respectively) refer to land grants by Charlemagne and other emperors wrote prior to the 11th centuries. These certificates, emitted for the Bourbon of Monte Santa Maria family (originally the Lords of Colle), possibly represent the first records referring to the Castle of Reschio. However, no such documentary evidence is still extant.

The first documentation of the castle is from 3 May 1202, when Uguccione di Ranieri of the Vagliana branch of the family of the Marchesi del Monte S. Maria, marchese di Colle e di Vagliana, submitted to the town of Perugia this castle and its properties along with those of Monte Gualandro, Castel Nuovo, Santa Maria di Pierle, Lisciano, and Tisciano. A treatise for protection was signed with the consuls of Perugia. The historian Litta, understands this to mean Uguccione was in possession of those sites by a grant from Federico Barbarossa, and, as the imperial power diminished, the obligation arose to keep them by vassalage treatise.

== Reschio, Imperial Feud ==
The Emperor Charles IV, by a certificate of May 14, 1355, invests Ugolino and his nephews Angelo, Guiduccio and Pietro Marchesi del Monte Santa Maria, with the castles of Marzana, Lippiano and Reschio, confirming their privileges (Mariotti 1835). Ugolino requested this deed from the Emperor, by which all Feuds are freed from protection bonds, of which investiture was given or confirmed (among them, the curia of Reschio is expressly mentioned). The family of the Marchesi del Monte S. Maria therefore depends directly from the Holy Roman Empire, thus freed from the Umbrian towns, where the various factions were always in conflict with each other. The marquisate hereby became an imperial “sovereign” feud. Ranieri di Ugolino was the only member of the Bourbon del Monte family who, after the investiture by Charles IV, did not have the title of marquis of Monte S. Maria, but was the first one to take on the title marquis of Reschio, most probably his place of residence.

== The Montemelini Family of Perugia ==
In 1364 the castle of Reschio still belonged to the Marquis of Monte S. Maria (Ranieri, the son of Ugolino di Berarda, used the title of Marquis of Reschio, likewise his son Antonio). The castle passed to the Montemelini family in 1365 when Antonia (Ranieri’s granddaughter) inherits a part of the marquisate of Reschio (including the Castle). Antonia was married to Ranieri di Tiberio Montemelini of Perugia, but had to defend the Castle from the pitfalls of her relatives (amongst which the toughest one her cousin Cerbone, who had many relatives killed in order to be sole proprietor of the marquisate). In 1593 Montemelini Lord of Reschio put his feud under the protection of the Grand Duke of Tuscany and was condemned by the Pope for having placed the coat of arms of the Medici on the gateway of the Castle.

== The bishop of Todi, Angiolo Cesi ==
In 1601 Count Niccolò, son of Napoleone Montemelini, sold this feud, through the Congregation of the Barons, to Mons. Angelo Cesi, bishop of Todi, who made a present of this to his nephew Venanzio Chiappino (as can be read in the inscription placed above the entrance to the Castle). The Notary Francesco Torelli drew up the sales deed in Perugia.

== Prospero Cimarra ==
On December 5, 1678 the County of Reschio was purchased by the Duke of Acquasparta for the sum of 25000 scudi. Cimarra, contractor of the Gabella del Macinato (grain and flour taxes) of the Towns, Countryside and Castles of the District of Rome, was indebted with the Apostolic Chamber by the sum of approximately 30000 scutes and therefore forced to sell the propriety of Reschio.

== The noble family Bichi Ruspoli Forteguerri di Siena ==
On May 27, 1692 Cardinal Carlo Bichi (May 6, 1638 – November 7, 1718; nominated cardinal by Alexander VIII in 1690), offered to purchase the County of Reschio for the sum of 23000 scutes on behalf of his nephew Marquis Galgano Bichi, of the noble family Bichi of Siena. The notary Francesco Antamoro drew up the sales deed, confirmed by Pope Innocent XII on October 11, on October 20, 1692.

This important family from Siena contributed decisively to the development of the community of Reschio, right up to the 1920s, when the inauguration of the first (and only) elementary school of Reschio took place, thanks to the determination of the teacher Nazareno Carnevali.

== The Castle in the Twentieth Century ==
In 1932, after 240 years, the marquis Ridolfo Bichi Ruspoli Forteguerri sold the estate of Reschio, including a number of farmhouses still part of the propriety to this day, to Professor Angiolo Maria Cenciarini. The sale took place “per aversionem” or “with closed gates” meaning including all the contents of the Castle, of the houses and farms on the estate. In the deed, drawn up by the notary Zati of Florence, one can read that the entire sum paid for the purchase corresponded to a total price of 800,000 lire. Under the Cenciarini, the property was dedicated to cultivation and processing of tobacco.

In 1970s, the property belonged to the counts of Bosca di Roveto, who renovated the castle.

In 1994, count Benedikt Bolza purchased the estate. The present owners have started a process of requalification of the entire real estate heritage, and recovery of the Castle.

== Bibliography ==
- Amoni, Daniele. Castelli fortezze e rocche dell'Umbria. Perugia: Quattroemme, 2010.
- Ascani, Angelo. Monte Santa Maria Tiberina e i suoi marchesi. Città di Castello, 1978.
- Benni, Giovanna. Incastellamento e signorie rurali nell'Alta valle del Tevere tra Alto e Basso Medioevo: il territorio di Umbertide. Perugia, 2006.
- Bonazzi, Luigi. Storia di Perugia dalle origini al 1860. Prima Edizione 1875-79. A cura di Giuliano Innamorati. Città di Castello: Unione Arti Grafiche, 1959-1960.
- Crispolti, Cesare. Cose notabili fuor di Perugia per il suo territorio. Perugia: Manoscritto, 1580-1608.
- Gamurrini, Eugenio. Istoria genealogica delle famiglie nobili toscane e umbre. Firenze: Francesco Onofri, 1668-1685.
- Giuseppe Belforti, Annibale Mariotti. Storia civile ed ecclesiastica del Contado di Perugia - Porta S. Angelo. 1751-1800.
- Litta, Pompeo. Famiglie celebri di Italia. Marchesi del Monte S. Maria nell'Umbria, detti Burbon delMonte. Vol. 2. 1819-1883.
- Mariotti, Annibale. Memorie dei Castelli dell'AgroPerugino situati in Porta S. Angelo. s. l.: copiate da Bernrdino Cimarra, 1835.
- Muzi, G. Memorie ecclesiastiche e civili di Città di Castello. A cura di Angelo Ascani (indice analitico). ivi: TipografiaFrancesco Donati, 1842-1844.
- Nico Ottaviani, M. Grazia. Rocche e fortificazioni nello Stato della Chiesa, Pubblicazioni dell'Università degli Studi di Perugia, Naples: Edizioni Scientifiche Italiane, 2004.
- Pellini, Pompeo. Dell' historia di Perugia. Riproduzione anastatica eseguita in Bologna per conto dell' Ed. Forni nel 1968.Venice: Giacomo Hertz, 1664.
- Porozzi, Bruno. Umbertide e il suo territorio, storia e immagini. Città di Castello: SO.GRA.TE., s.d. (1983).
- Silvestrini, Marcello. Memorie storiche di LiscianoNiccone. s.d.
- Val di Pierle memorie storiche. Redatte dal Parroco Giovanni Battista Millotti tra il 1891 e il 1894. Perugia: Guerra Editor, 2010.
- Tabarrini, Mario. L'Umbria si racconta. Dizionario. Assisi: Tipografia Porziuncola, 1982.
- Tiberini, Sandro. I "Marchesi di Colle" dall'inizio del secolo XII alla metà del XIII: la costruzione del dominato territoriale. Firenze: Leo S. Olschki Editore, 1997.
- Le signorie rurali nell'Umbria settentrionale: Perugia e Gubbio, secc.XI-XIII. Ministero per i beni e le attività culturali, Ufficio centrale per i beni archivistici, 1999.
