= Crispolti =

Crispolti is a surname. Notable people with the surname include:

- Cesare Crispolti (1563–1608), Italian Renaissance scholar
- Enrico Crispolti (1933–2018), Italian art critic, curator, and art historian
