= Zophorus =

Zophorus may refer to:

- Zoophorus, an Ancient Greek term meaning "bearing animals"
- Zophorus, an album by Masami Akita
