= Tectonics (architecture) =

Reflection of the building's structure in its appearance

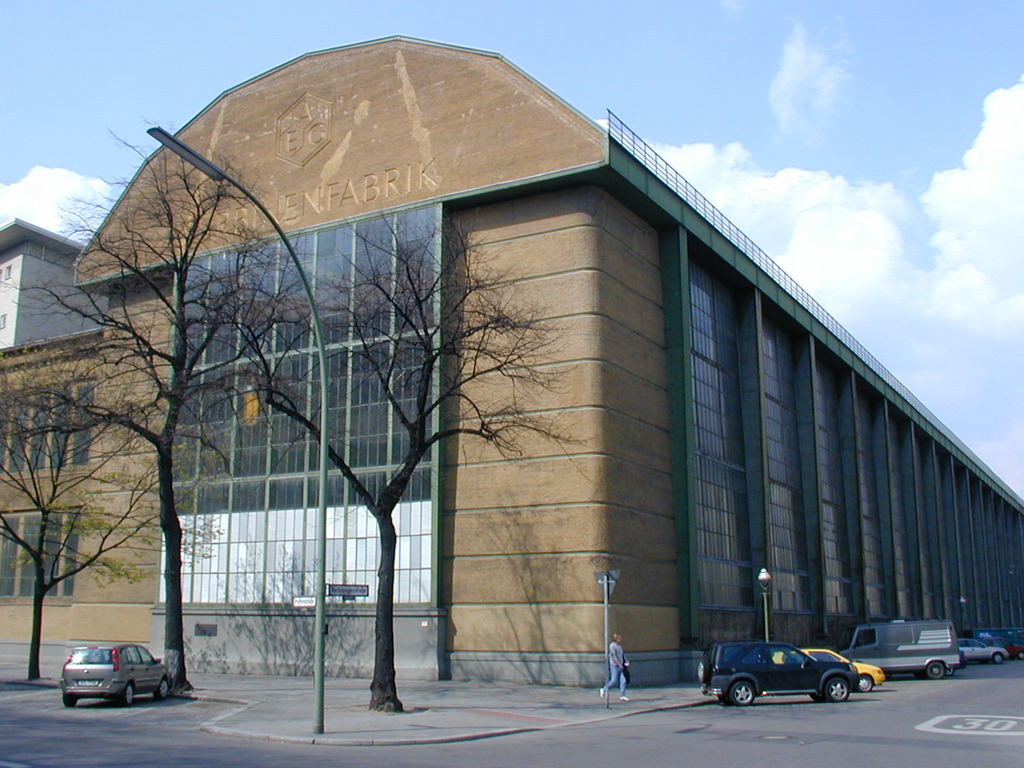
AEG turbine factory (Peter Behrens, 1909)

In modern architectural theory, the tectonics is an artistic way to express the corporeality of a building through architectural forms that visually reflect the actual structure. An example of the use of tectonics and its opposite, atectonics, can be found at the AEG turbine factory: Peter Behrens, the architect, had applied tectonics by revealing the steel frame that supports the roof on the long side of the building, and used atectonics by constructing massive "Egyptian-like" walls in the corners that are not connected to the roof and thus conceal the actual load and support organization of the frontal facade.

The tectonics, "poetics of construction", has multiple related meanings.

Tectonics is inseparable from the physical nature of buildings and thus counteracts external influences of other visual arts on architecture.

== History ==
The word "tectonic" comes from Ancient Greek: τεκτων, "carpenter, builder" that eventually led to master builder, ἀρχιτέκτων (now architect). First application to modern architecture belongs to Karl Otfried Müller, in Handbuch der Archaologie der Kunst (Handbook of the Archeology of Art, 1830) he defined the art forms that combine art with utility (from utensils to dwellings) as German: tektonische, with the architecture being the peak of this tectonic activities. Karl Botticher in his Die Tektonik der Hellenen (The Tectonic of the Hellenes, 1843-1852) suggested splitting the design into a structural "core-form" (German: Kernform) and decorative "art-form" (German: Kunstform). Art-form was supposed to reflect the functionality of the core-form: for example, rounding and tapering of the column should suggest its load-bearing function. Tectonic system was supposed to bind these multiple facets of a building (Greek temple) into a unified whole (for example, through relief sculptures using structural elements as framing).

=== Atectonics ===
Atectonics is an inverse of tectonics, a situation where the artistic appearance of the architectural form is detached from its structure and construction. Eduard Sekler introduced the concept of atectonics in 1911 as the arrangement where the interplay between load and support is "visually neglected or obscured". An architect can use both the tectonics and atectonics simultaneously (cf. the AEG turbine factory example above). Even if the construction and structure are interdependent and exposed, like in the Crystal Palace, there is some space left for the atectonics (while the columns in this building carried different loads, they all appeared to be of the uniform width, with load variations accommodated through the thickness of their walls).

== Sources ==
- Frampton, Kenneth (2001). Cava, John (ed.). Studies in Tectonic Culture: The Poetics of Construction in Nineteenth and Twentieth Century Architecture. MIT Press. ISBN 978-0-262-56149-5.
- Mallgrave, H.F. (2009). Modern Architectural Theory: A Historical Survey, 1673–1968. Cambridge University Press. ISBN 978-1-139-44340-1.
- Yordanova, N.S. (2019). "A new approach to the concept of tectonics". In Cruz, P.J.S. (ed.). Structures and Architecture - Bridging the Gap and Crossing Borders: Proceedings of the Fourth International Conference on Structures and Architecture (ICSA 2019), July 24-26, 2019, Lisbon, Portugal. Structures and Architecture. CRC Press. pp. 1056–1063. ISBN 978-1-351-85815-1.
