= Mark Welser =

German banker, politician, and astronomer (558–1614)

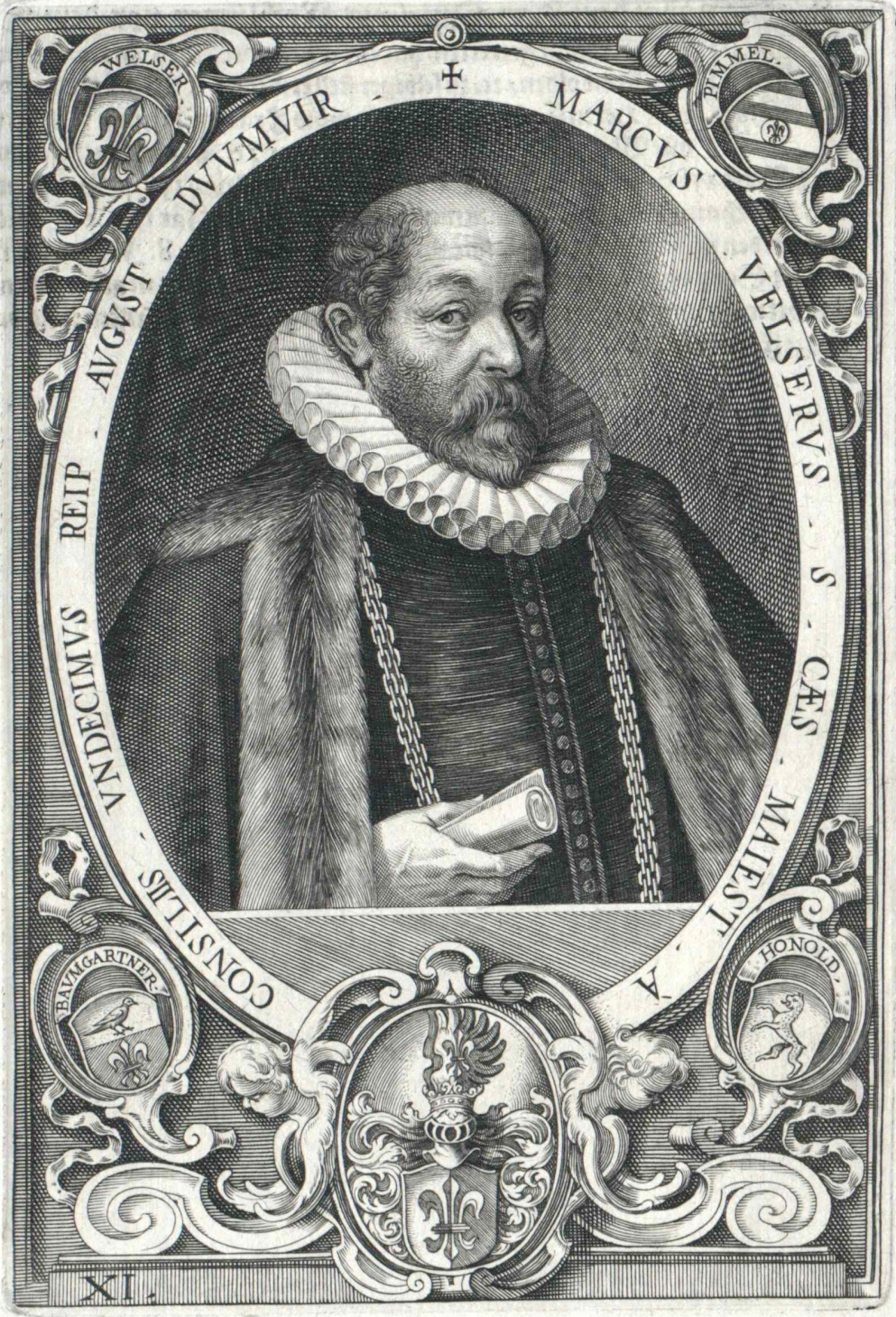

Mark Welser (1558–1614) was a German banker, politician, and astronomer, who engaged in learned correspondence with European intellectuals of his time. Of particular note is his exchange with Galileo Galilei, regarding sunspots.

== Biography ==
Welser belonged to a rich family of the old German nobility that had emerged in the city of Augsburg. His uncle Bartholomeus Welser was one of the originators of the family wealth; with the Fugger family he financed the imperial election of Charles V, whose counselor he became. He was a commercial leader in Portuguese spices and in the economic growth of Antwerp. He also had an economic relationship with the French crown. In 1528, Bartholomeus, who had outfitted a fleet to the Americas, took control of the colony of Venezuela, obtaining from the emperor the right to retain ownership of it via an annual payment. His descendants kept it until 1555, when Spain took control of Venezuela.

At the age of 16, Mark was sent to Padua, where he studied for ten years. Three years later he studied rhetoric with Muretus at Rome together with Marco Antonio Bonciari. He traveled often to France, and stayed in Paris in 1572. He became duumvir of Augsburg in 1611, but was also distinguished for his scholarship and his writings. He also traveled to Italy, and in 1612 in Rome, he was named a member of the Accademia dei Lincei; the following year, he was elected to the Accademia della Crusca.

Mark was familiar with the Italian language and interested in historical research, and in the study of Greek and Latin authors, whose dissemination he promoted by financing the publishing house "Ad Insignia Pinus". The most important of his many works is his Rerum Boicarum libri quinque, dealing with the early history of the Bavarians, which was translated into German by the author's brother Paul (died 1620). His collected works, under the title Marci Velseri opera historica et philologica, were collected and published in 1682 with a biography of Mark by C. Arnold.

=== Controversy regarding sunspots ===
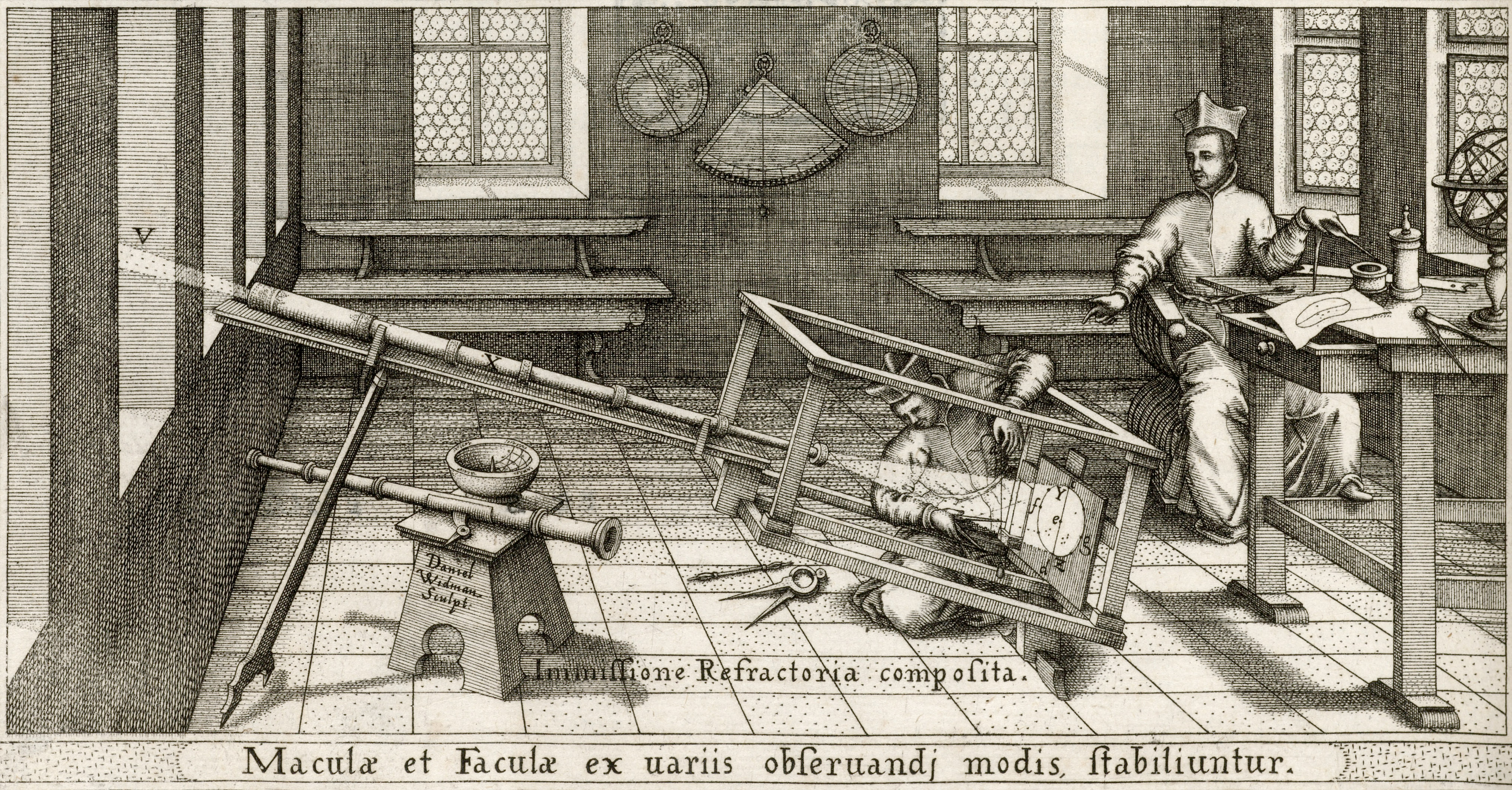
Christoph Scheiner observing sunspots

In late 1611, the Jesuit Christoph Scheiner, a mathematics teacher at Ingolstadt, using the pseudonym Apelles latens post tabulam (Apelles hiding behind the painting), (Note: It was said of the Greek painter Apelles that he would hide behind his paintings, to observe the reactions of the viewer.) wrote three letters to Welser, claiming the discovery of sunspots. These, Scheiner held, could not be an alteration of the Sun, which according to Aristotelian doctrine was an incorruptible celestial body, but instead were stars interposed between Earth and the Sun, which by an optical illusion appeared to be on the solar surface. Welser, a patron of academics and strongly connected with the Jesuits, caused Scheiner's observations to be published, and asked Galileo for an opinion. Galileo responded to Welser, criticizing him for diffusing an erroneous theory, which Galileo identified as having Jesuit origin, of three satellites orbiting the Sun. Scheiner responded, this time openly sustaining his theory with the book De maculis solaribus [...] accuratior disquisitio. Galileo replied in December 1612 with a third letter to Welser in which he claimed that he, prior to Scheiner, had discovered sunspots. (Note: In truth, sunspots were observed telescopically for the first time in 1610 by the Frisian astronomers Johannes and David Fabricius, who published a description in June 1611. By then, Galileo was already showing sunspots to astronomers in Rome, and Scheiner had probably observed the spots for two or three months. The priority dispute between Galileo and Scheiner, neither of whom knew of the work of the Fabriciuses, was therefore moot.) In 1613, under the auspices of the Accademia dei Lincei, Galileo published Istoria e dimostrazioni intorno alle macchie solari e loro accidenti ("History and demonstration regarding sunspots and their behavior"), confirming that sunspots were present, disappearing and reforming, on the corruptible surface of the Sun, which with reasonable probability drew them along with its rotation.

=== Death ===
Welser, who suffered from severe gout, died the following year, after going through economic troubles that had disturbed his final years of life.

== Bibliography ==
- Papy, J. (1998). "Lipsius and Marcus Welser: the antiquarian's life as via media". Bulletin de l'Institut Historique Belge de Rome. LXVIII: 173–190.
