= Karl Bötticher =

German archaeologist (1806–1889)

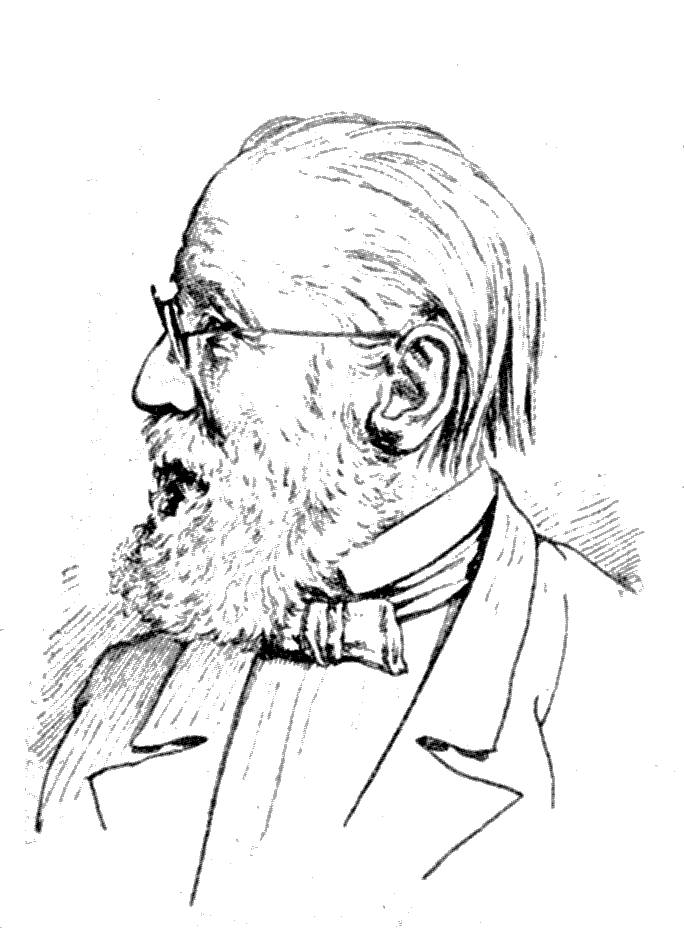
Karl Bötticher

Karl Gottlieb Wilhelm Bötticher (29 May 1806, Nordhausen – 19 June 1889, Berlin) was a German archaeologist who specialized in architecture.

== Biography ==
He was born in Nordhausen, Thuringia, the oldest of several children born to the baker and innkeeper August Bötticher. After the separation of his parents, the young Karl was the only child to remain with his father, who would remarry twice: his father's second wife died in 1819, and he had three more children with his third wife, whose dowry had brought the family a newfound affluence. In part because of his complicated family situation, and in part because his father was a stern and irascible man, the young Bötticher was not encouraged to develop his artistic or musical talents except by his first stepmother (who died young and childless). Nonetheless, Bötticher did learn to play the violin at the age of nine and showed an unusual talent for drawing, hoping to become a painter. In high school, it was only thanks to the intervention of his principal that Bötticher was able to obtain an apprenticeship in the building trades, as a surveryor and clerk of the works. His professors encouraged him to continue his studies privately in art history and obtain a professional education, and his father assented, viewing architecture and construction as a practical career. Bötticher matriculated to the Academy of Architecture (Bauakademie) in Berlin, having studied mathematics in Erfurt during 1826 as preparatory studies for future work in land surveying.

Once he arrived in Berlin, however, Bötticher decided that he no longer aspired to a professional career in the construction industry. He refused further financial assistance from his father and took several freelance jobs designing for commercial enterprises. In the course of his studies, he became strongly attracted to Gothic art and architecture, a current that was taking root in the German-speaking world through the spread of artistic Romanticism and the influence of Karl Friedrich Schinkel, one of Bötticher's teachers at the Bauakademie, and painters such as Caspar David Friedrich. Bötticher's designs reflected this and in 1830 Schinkel asked him to collaborate on the drawings and lithographs for the pattern book Vorbilder für Fabrikanten und Handwerker by Christian Beuth. Bötticher learned lithography specifically to complete the work. Afterwards, while teaching at the School of Painting of the Royal Manufactory of Porcelain (which he started in 1833), he also learned the craft of weaving, and in 1834 also began to teach at the School of Design of the Industrial Institute there. In 1844, he was appointed a professor of tectonics (architectonics) at the Academy of Architecture. In 1833, he married Emilie Stier.

Bötticher soon became attracted to Greek art during the 1830s, which became also a feature of his artistic production, most notably his work Die Tektonik der Hellenen (The Tectonics of the Greeks; 2 volumes, 1844–52). This put him into conflict with the Romanticists at the Bauakademie, who, like Bötticher himself had been earlier, were more drawn to the medieval. Bötticher's work sparked a lively debate in the German-speaking world; among the ideas critiqued later on were his views on curvature in design, which the architect Ernst Ziller investigated in Greece himself in 1864–65. On 13 March 1846, on what would have been Schinkel's 65th birthday, Bötticher gave an honorific lecture entitled "Das Princip der hellenischen und germanischen Bauweise bezüglich der Übertragung in die Bauweise unserer Tage" ("The Principle of Greek and German Architecture in Light of the Transformation of the Architecture of Our Time"), which was itself only published in 1906, on the centenary of Bötticher's own birth. During the Revolutions of 1848, Bötticher served as a volunteer in the royal Prussian Army and entrusted his responsibilities at the Bauakademie to an adjunct instructor. In 1853, he received his doctorate from the University of Greifswald, and then in 1854 his habilitation, which procured for him a post as lecturer at the University of Berlin until 1862.

These were difficult years in Bötticher's life. The same year he received his habilitation, his only son died at the age of 13. This was followed by his divorce in 1858. Bötticher remarried the widow of a colleague in 1859, but his second wife died in 1872. In 1855, along with his teaching activities, he was appointed to the post as an assistant to the collection of sculpture at the Antikensammlung Berlin, and in 1868, became the department's director. In 1860, he was chosen as a corresponding member of the Academy of Sciences of Gottingen. It was, oddly, only in 1862 that Bötticher himself finally visited Greece in person and saw the architecture that he had long before written about, but his work led him to numerous erroneous conclusions about it.

His directorship at the museum was marked by several unfortunate decisions and conflicts. His systematic arrangement of the display of the sculpture collection was later abandoned, and errors in conservation of the sculptures led to their deterioration. Finally, his explicative list of casts of ancient works in 1871 led Bötticher to resign his teaching posts and the directorship in 1875–76 and to resign from the Archaeological Society. His successor at the museum, Alexander Conze, is famous for his work in bringing the Pergamon Altar into the collections in 1878. In 1877 Bötticher married for the third time and traveled to Italy for the first time along with another trip to Greece. In Venice, he met Gottfried Semper, with whom he differed in methodology, though this apparently did not detract from their personal relationship. On 19 June 1889 Bötticher died in Berlin after a short illness and is interred in the Trinity Cemetery II (Dreifaltigkeitskirchhof II).

== Works ==
Bötticher's chief work is the "Tektonik der Hellenen" (Architectonics of the Greeks; 1844–52), a contribution to the study of Ancient Greek architecture. In this work Bötticher suggested splitting the architectural form into a structural "core-form" (German: Kernform) and decorative "art-form" (German: Kunstform). Art-form was supposed to reflect the functionality of the core-form: for example, rounding and tapering of the column should suggest its load-bearing function.

Some other works of his are:

- Holzarchitektur des Mittelalters ('Wooden architecture of the Middle Ages', 1835–41).
- Das Grab des Dionysos. An der Marmorbasis zu Dresden, ('The tomb of Dionysos: on the marble base at Dresden', 1858).
- Der Omphalos des Zeus zu Delphi, ('The Omphalos of Zeus at Delphi', 1859)
- Bericht über die Untersuchungen auf der Akropolis in Athen ('Report on the investigations on the Acropolis in Athens', 1863).
- Der Zophoros am Parthenon ('The zophorus of the Parthenon', 1875).
- Die Thymele der Athena Nike auf der Akropolis von Athen ('The thymele of Athena Nike on the Acropolis of Athens', 1880).
