= Secondo Lancellotti =

Italian Olivetan monk and scholar (1583–1643)

Dom Secondo Lancellotti OSB Oliv.
- Title: abbot

Personal life
- Born: Vincenzo Lancellotti; 19 March 1583 Perugia, Papal States
- Died: 16 January 1643 (aged 59) Paris, Kingdom of France
- Parent(s): Ortensio Lancellotti and Camilla Lancellotti (née Sebastiani)
- Known for: his contributions to the development of the Quarrel of the Ancients and the Moderns
- Occupation: Christian monk; Historian; Philologist

Religious life
- Religion: Roman Catholicism
- Order: Olivetans
- Ordination: April 1599

Secondo Lancellotti OSB Oliv. (19 March 1583 – 16 January 1643) was an Italian Olivetan monk and scholar, one of the leading figures in the early Quarrel of the Ancients and the Moderns.

== Biography ==
Born in Perugia, he entered the Olivetans in 1594 and became a preacher. He studied humanities and theology at the abbey of Monte Morcino. Among his teachers was Marco Antonio Bonciari, a fine and witty literate who corresponded, among others, with Baronius. In 1611 he left the order and began a life of wandering around Italy.

Lancellotti lived a restless, unhappy life and expressed iconoclastic opinions that gave rise to a lively debate throughout Italy. In 1623 he published his main work, L’hoggidì, overo il mondo non peggiore né più calamitoso del passato, dedicated to Pope Urban VIII. The book's title refers to a contemporary practice that Lancellotti deplored, that of criticizing the present («oggidì») as inferior to classical antiquity.

Lancellotti was an ardent defender of modernity. Like Paolo Beni and Alessandro Tassoni, he does not dismiss the ancients out of hand, but weighs up the relative merits of ancients and moderns and comes to the conclusion that modern Italian achievements in the humanities and sciences outstrip those of the past, thus signalling the end of the humanistic project that had started in the 14th century. The work was praised by George Hakewill and is considered one of the starting points of the Quarrel of the Ancients and the Moderns.

Lancellotti moved to Rome in the late 1620s, where he became a member of the Accademia degli Umoristi. In 1636 he renewed his modernist thesis with I farfalloni degli antichi historici notati. His work on the fallibility of human wisdom, Chi l’indovina è savio, was published in 1640. At Rome he befriended the famous scholar Gabriel Naudé, who persuaded him to accompany him to Paris, where he died in 1643.

== Works ==
- Lancellotti, Secondo (1623). "Historiae olivetanae" (in Latin). Venetiis: ex Typographia Gueriliana.
- Lancellotti, Secondo (1623). "L'hoggidì ouero il mondo non peggiore né più calamitoso del passato". Venice: appresso Gio. Guerigli.
- Lancellotti, Secondo (1628). "Il Mercurio olivetano ovvero La Guida per le strade dell'Italia per le quali sogliono passare i monaci olivetani". Perugia: per Angelo Bartoli.
- Il vestir di bianco di alcuni religiosi, e particolarmente olivetani. Perugia: Bartoli. 1628.
- Lancellotti, Secondo (1636). "L'hoggidi ouero gl'ingegni non inferiori a' passati". Venice: appresso gli Gueriglii.
- Lancellotti, Secondo (1636). Farfalloni de gli antichi Historici. Venice: presso Giacomo Sarzina.
- Lancellotti, Secondo (1640). Chi l'indovina è savio overo La prudenza humana fallacissima. Libri otto. Venice: appresso li Guerigli.
- Del Griffone, arme od ingiuria dell'augusta città di Perugia, 1640.
- Lancellotti, Secondo (1641). L'Orvietano per gli Hoggidiani, cioè Per quelli, che patiscono del male dell'Hoggidianismo. Paris: appresso Teodoro Pepingué.
- Lancellotti, Secondo (1770). Les impostures de l'histoire ancienne et profane (in French). Vol. 1. Paris: J.P. Costard.
- Lancellotti, Secondo (1770). Les impostures de l'histoire ancienne et profane (in French). Vol. 2. Paris: J.P. Costard.

== Bibliography ==
- Degli Azzi, Giustiniano (1917). "Un frate di spirito nel Seicento (don Secondo Lancellotti da Perugia)". Bollettino della R. Deputazione di Storia Patria per l'Umbria. XXII: 217–228.
- Vismara, Silvio (1921). "L'abate Lancellotti e il cardinale Federico Borromeo". Rivista storica benedettina. XII: 136–142.
- Savini, Marta (1971). "A proposito di alcuni inediti di Secondo Lancellotti". Lettere Italiane. XXIII (1): 85–111. JSTOR 26252157.
- Ulivi, Ferruccio (1972). "Scheda su Secondo Lancellotti". Storia e cultura in Umbria nell'età moderna… Atti del VII Convegno di Studi umbri, Gubbio… 1969. Perugia: 39–51.
- Arato, Franco (1995). "Un erudito barocco: Secondo Lancellotti". Giornale Storico della Letteratura Italiana. CLXXII: 509–549.
- Arato, Franco (1996). "Un enciclopedista perugino del Seicento: Secondo Lancellotti". L'Enciclopedismo in Italia Nel Secolo XVIII. Naples: 25–41.
- Catucci, M. (1998). "La vita di Alessandro III del Loredano e i "Farfalloni" del Lancellotti". Sincronie. II: 169–178.
- Diffley, P. (2002). "Lancellotti, Secondo". The Oxford Companion to Italian Literature. Oxford University Press. ISBN 978-0-19-818332-7.
- Walter, Hermann (2003). "L'Età dell'oro nell'Oggidì dell'abate olivetano Secondo Lancellotti". Millenarismo ed età dell'oro nel Rinascimento: atti del XIII Convegno internazionale, Chianciano-Montepulciano-Pienza, 16-19 luglio 2001. Florence: Franco Cesati Editore. pp. 669–678. ISBN 978-88-7667-156-2.
- Russo, Emilio (2004). "LANCELLOTTI, Secondo". Dizionario Biografico degli Italiani (in Italian). Vol. 63: Labroca–Laterza. Rome: Istituto dell'Enciclopedia Italiana. ISBN 978-88-12-00032-6.
- Cherchi, Paolo (2005). "Secondo Lancellotti: le concordanze delle storie e gli errori degli antichi". Italica. 82 (3/4): 490–509. JSTOR 27669029.
