= August Schmarsow =

German art historian

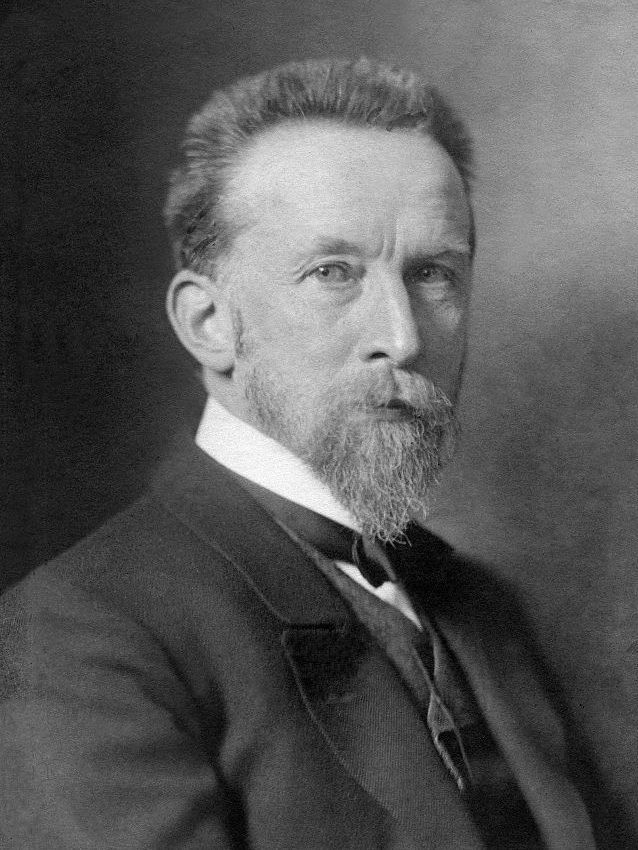
- August Schmarsow 1913
- Born: 26 May 1853; Schildfeld, Grand Duchy of Mecklenburg-Schwerin, German Confederation
- Died: 19 January 1936 (aged 82); Baden-Baden, Nazi Germany
- Occupations: Art historian, professor

August Schmarsow (26 May 1853, Schildfeld – 19 January 1936) was a German art historian.

== Biography ==
He was born in Schildfeld (now part of Vellahn), Mecklenburg-Schwerin, and was educated in Zurich, Strassburg and Bonn. He became docent of the history of art at Göttingen in 1881, professor there in 1882, at Breslau in 1885, and went to Florence in 1892, and thence to Leipzig in 1893.

In 1888 he founded the Kunsthistorisches Institut in Florenz (Institute for the History of Art, Florence), an institution to promote original research in the history of Italian art, now part of the Max Planck Society, a German state institution.

== Literary works ==
His writings are characterized by sound scholarship and acute criticism. He wrote biographies of David D'Angers, Ingres, and Prudhon in Robert Dohme's Kunst und Kunstler; Raphael und Pinturicchio in Siena (1880); he also wrote:

- Melozzo da Forli (1886)
- Giovanni Santi (1887)
- St. Martin von Lucca und die Anfänge der toskanischen Sculptur im Mittelalter (1889)
- Masaccio-Studien (1895–99), with atlas
- Barock und Rokoko (1897)
- Grundbegriffe der Kunstwissenschaft (1905)
- Federigo Barocci (1909–10)
- Gherardo Starnina (1912)

== Theory of architecture ==
Schmarsow is known for his theory of German: Raumgestaltung, "space-forming", that he developed in a short Das Wesen von architektonischen Schöpfung (1893) and the Grundbegriffe der Kunstwissenschaft (1905). He fundamentally altered the balance between space and mass in favor of the former: prior to his work space was considered to be a void inside the solid building, while the modern architecture treats the structures as means to define the extensions of space. Schmarsow declared that the architectural form should be understood through the movement of visitors through the space and not as an object of stationary observation.

== Sources ==
- Schwarzer, Mitchell W. (1991). "The Emergence of Architectural Space: August Schmarsow's Theory of Raumgestaltung". Assemblage (15). The MIT Press: 49–61. ISSN 0889-3012. JSTOR 3171125.
