= Marco Antonio Bonciari =

Italian Renaissance scholar

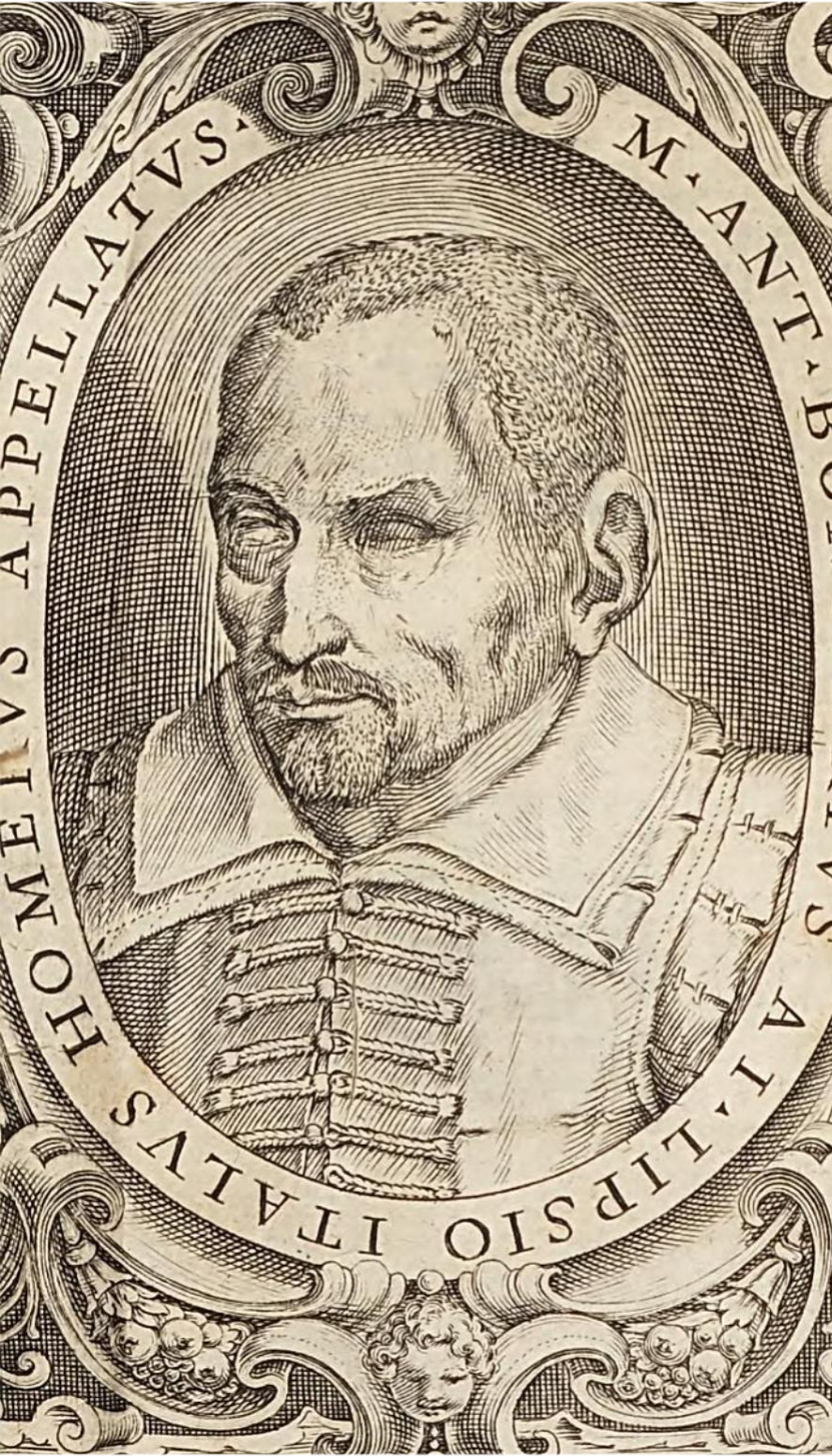
- Born: February 9, 1555; Antria, Perugia, Papal States
- Died: 9 January 1616 (aged 60); Perugia, Papal States
- Occupations: Renaissance humanist; Latinist
- Parent(s): Mario Bonciari and Francesca Bonciari (née Puracci)

Academic work
- Era: Renaissance
- Discipline: Classics
- Notable students: Cesare Crispolti; Secondo Lancellotti

Marco Antonio Bonciari or Bonciario (9 February 1555 – 9 January 1616) was an Italian Renaissance scholar and writer.

== Biography ==
Marco Antonio Bonciari was born at Antria, a small village near Perugia, on 9 February 1555. He studied humanities with the French scholar Muretus at Rome. His patron Fulvio Giulio della Corgna appointed him director of the seminary that he had established in Perugia. He taught the classics until 1590, when he went blind. He had among his pupils the famous Perugian scholars Secondo Lancellotti and Cesare Crispolti. He died in 1616. His works in Latin include a Latin Grammar was widely used in Italian schools, and went through several reeditions. Bonciari was a member of the Accademia degli Insensati of Perugia, assuming the pseudonym of Terrestre. He was in active correspondence with famous scholars: the philologists Justus Lipsius and Erycius Puteanus, the cardinals Caesar Baronius, Robert Bellarmine and Silvio Antoniano, the humanists Gian Vincenzo Pinelli, Mark Welser, Aldus Manutius the Younger and Girolamo Mercuriale, the poet Angelo Grillo and the jesuits Orazio Torsellino and Giovanni Pietro Maffei. In 1611, he was admitted to the Accademia degli Umoristi of Rome.

== Works ==
- Grammatica, Perugia, 1593, 1600, 1601, 1630, in-8°.
- Epistolæ in XII libros divisæ, Perugia, 1603, 1604, 1612, 1613, in-8°.
- Seraphidos lib. V, aliaque pia poemata. Perugia: apud Academicos Augustos. 1606.
- Idyllia et selectarum epistolarum centuria nova, cum decuriis duabus. Perugia: apud Academicos Augustos. 1607.
- Opuscula decem varii argumenti. Perugia: apud Academicos Augustos. 1607.
- Extaticus, sive de ludicra poesi Dialogus, Perugia, 1607, in-8°; 1615, in-8°.
- Triumphus augustus, sive de Sanctis Perusiæ translatis libri IV. Perugia: apud Marcum Naccarinum. 1610.

== Bibliography ==
- Rossi, Gian Vittorio (1642). Pinacotheca imaginum illustrium. Vol. I. Lipsiae. pp. 98–100.
- Mazzucchelli, Giammaria (1762). Gli scrittori d'Italia. Vol. II, 3. Brescia: Giambattista Bossini. pp. 1571–577.
- Negri, Renzo (1969). "BONCIARI, Marco Antonio". Dizionario Biografico degli Italiani (in Italian). Vol. 11: Boccadibue–Bonetti. Rome: Istituto dell'Enciclopedia Italiana. ISBN 978-88-12-00032-6.
