= Infill wall =

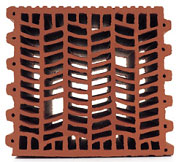
Thermobrick block for infill

The infill wall is the supported wall that closes the perimeter of a building constructed with a three-dimensional framework structure (generally made of steel or reinforced concrete). Therefore, the structural frame ensures the bearing function, whereas the infill wall serves to separate inner and outer space, filling up the boxes of the outer frames. The infill wall has the unique static function to bear its own weight. The infill wall is an external vertical opaque type of closure. With respect to other categories of wall, the infill wall differs from the partition that serves to separate two interior spaces, yet also non-load bearing, and from the load bearing wall. The latter performs the same functions of the infill wall, hygro-thermically and acoustically, but performs static functions too.

The use of masonry infill walls, and to some extent veneer walls, especially in reinforced concrete frame structures, is common in many countries. In fact, the use of masonry infill walls offers an economical and durable solution. They are easy to build, attractive for architecture and have a very efficient cost-performance.

Today, masonry enclosures and partition walls are mainly made of clay units, but also aggregate concrete units (dense and lightweight aggregate) and autoclaved aerated concrete units are used. More recently, industry is also trying to introduce wood concrete blocks. Partition walls, made with both vertically and horizontally perforated clay blocks, represent two-thirds of the corresponding market.

== Requirements for enclosure systems ==
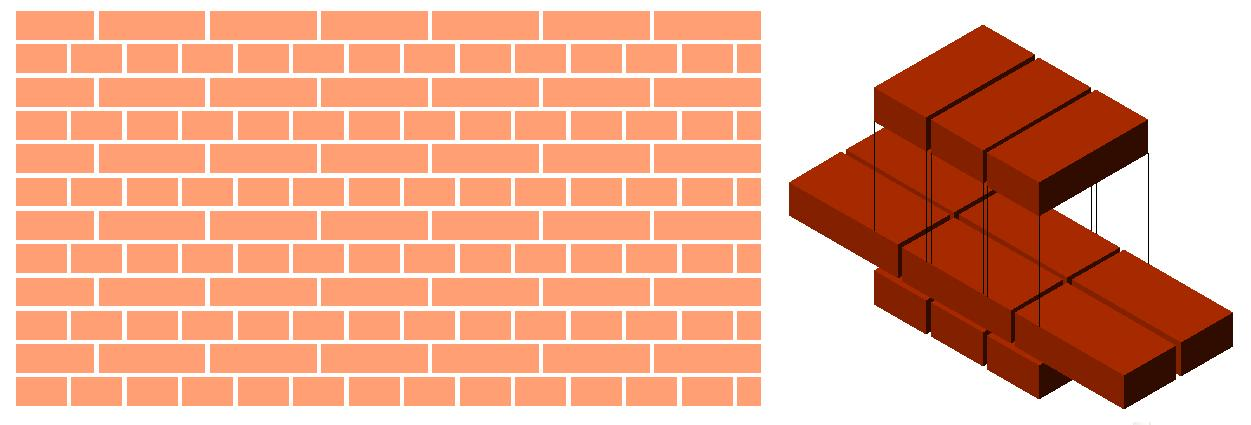
Single-layer masonry in solid brick with two heads

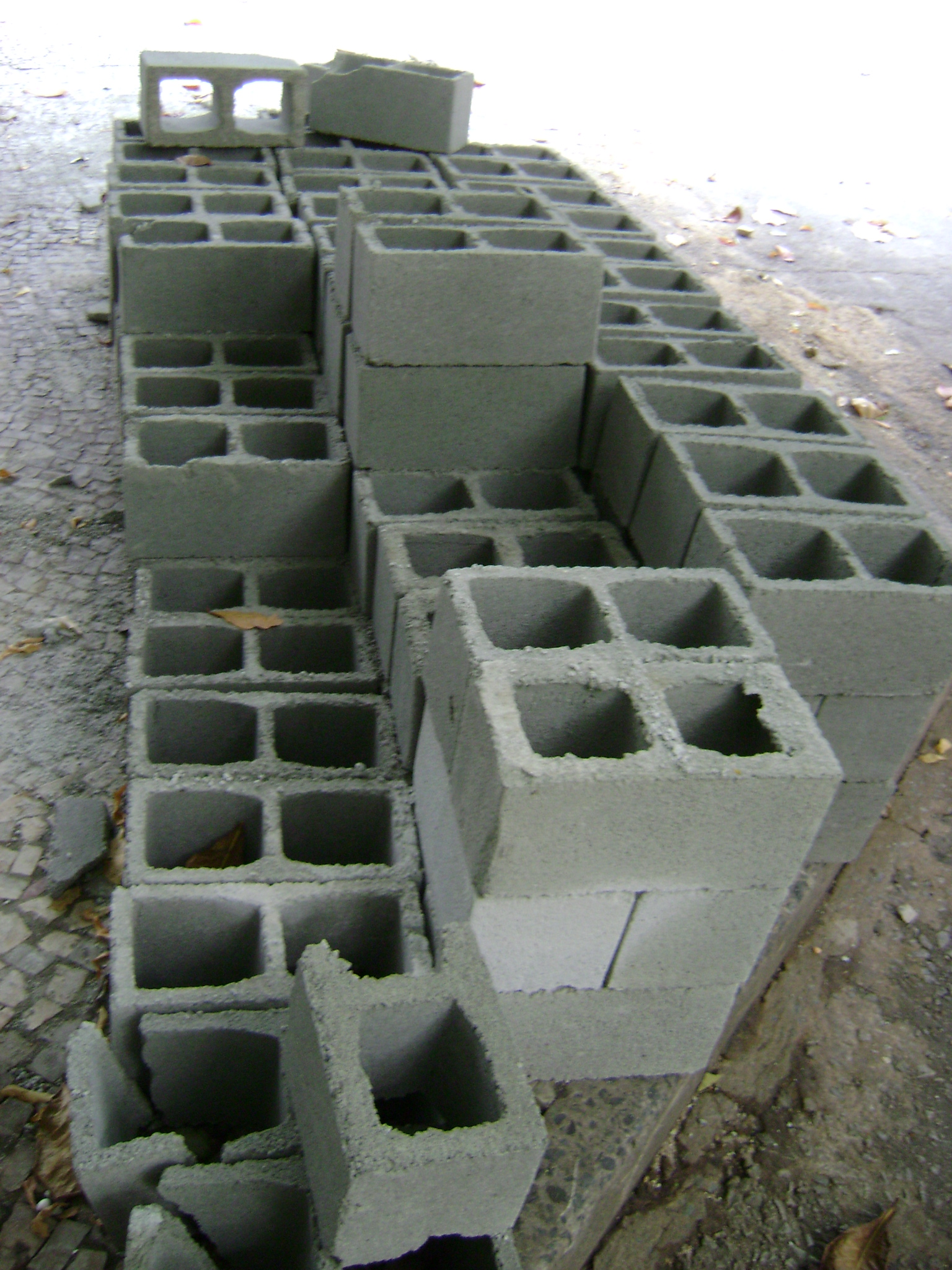
Honeycomb concrete blocks

Masonry enclosure walls systems, must meet some structural and non-structural requirements.

=== Structural ===
The requirements relating structural stability are currently defined and regulated by Eurocode 6 for load bearing masonry structures and by Eurocode 8 for seismic safety. These codes impose requirements for masonry walls, particularly non-collapse (in-plane/out of plane) and damage limitation, providing methods of calculation to ensure these two requirements. Some of the non-structural requirements are: fire safety, thermal comfort, acoustic comfort, durability and water leakage.

=== Fire safety ===
The safety against fire is one of the requirements that is often required to enclosures walls. However, as usually the more traditionally used materials (blocks, bricks and mortar) are not fuel products, it is relatively easy to achieve the requirements relating to the limitation of spread of fire, thermal insulation and structural strength, which in severe cases, must be guaranteed for 180 minutes.

=== Thermal comfort ===
The thermal comfort is a requirement with which the enclosure walls must comply. This requirement has a direct influence on the construction of the walls. The thermal regulations are demanding increasingly higher values of thermal resistance to the walls. To meet these demands new products and building systems, which ensure that the thermal resistances requested by the regulations will be provided, are developed. It is likely that in the near future traditional construction solutions with double leaf walls (with new, more thermally efficient bricks and blocks) will be adapted, and there will be increased use of thermal insulation systems for exterior (ETICS), such as use of single leaf walls. Also the use of insulation systems from the inside will increase. The development of new enclosure wall systems should, apart from trying to improve requisites relating to structural stability in case of earthquake, improve the thermal resistance of the solution.

=== Durability and waterproofing ===
To ensure durability and waterproofing, the most important thing is to avoid errors in design and construction, leading to the appearance of (structural and non-structural) pathologies. Some requisites that the walls must have in order to avoid pathologies are: adequate expansion joints, correct support of the walls in the correction of thermal bridges, appropriate clipping between masonry leafs, correct implementation of space between leafs, proper placement of thermal insulation. The proper use of paints, protection against moisture and the correct preparation and application of traditional plasters, among others, are important factors

== Interaction between buildings and masonry infills ==
=== Global behaviour ===
When there is the perimeter contact between the masonry infill walls and the frame, in ordinary situations of adherent robust infill walls, the effect of stiffness increase (and also dissipation) influences the building response. In the case of infill walls built disconnected from the structure (not in adherence with the frame elements), it is likely that infill walls act as an additional mass applied to the structure only, and should not have other significant effects.
In general, in the most frequent case of perimeter contact between the masonry panels and the beams and columns of the RC structure, the infill panels interact with the structure, regardless of the lateral resistance capacity of the structure, and act like structural elements, overtaking lateral loads until they are badly damaged or destroyed. In this case, the most important effects of the structure-infill interaction are:

- Increased lateral rigidity of the structure; in the case of flexible structures from seismic zones with small values of the period Tc, the seismic forces increase over the normal level;
- Creating some vertical irregularities by increasing the ductility demand at one storey, or creating some horizontal irregularities by increasing the ensemble torsion as a result of modifying the centre of rigidity; for the design of buildings in seismic zones, these situations must be always avoided;
- Creating some solicitations of short elements type, having a risk of rupture to shear force, due to the fact that on the deformable zone of the column the shear force is substantially larger than in the normal case (also treated as local effect).

=== Local behavior ===
The main problems in the local interaction between frame and infill are the formation of short beam, short column effect in the structural elements. The zones in which supplementary shear forces can occur, acting locally on the extremities of the beams and columns, should be dimensioned and transversally reinforced in order to overtake safely these forces.

== Infill wall types ==
=== Single-leaf wall ===
A wall without a cavity or continuous vertical joint in its plane.

=== Cavity wall ===
A wall consisting of two parallel single-leaf walls, effectively tied together with wall ties or bed joint reinforcement. The space between the leaves is left as a continuous cavity or filled or partially filled with non-loadbearing thermal insulating material. A wall consisting of two leaves separated by a cavity, where one of the leaves is not contributing to the strength or stiffness of the other (possibly loadbearing) leaf, is to be regarded as a veneer wall.

=== Veneer wall ===
A wall used as a facing but not bonded or contributing to the strength of the backing wall or framed structure.
