= François Charpentier =

French archaeologist and man of letters

François Charpentier (French pronunciation: [fʁɑ̃swa ʃaʁpɑ̃tje]; 15 February 1620 – 22 April 1702) was a French archaeologist and man of letters.

== Biography ==
Charpentier was born in Paris, and intended for the bar, but was employed by Colbert, who had determined on the foundation of a French East India Company, to draw up an explanatory account of the project for Louis XIV.

Charpentier regarded as absurd the use of Latin in monumental inscriptions, and to him was entrusted the task of supplying the paintings of Charles Le Brun in the Versailles Gallery with appropriate legends. His verses were so indifferent that they had to be replaced by others, the work of Jean Racine and Nicolas Boileau-Despréaux, both enemies of his. Charpentier in his Excellence de la langue française (1683) had anticipated Charles Perrault in the famous academical dispute concerning the relative merit of the ancients and moderns. He is credited with a share in the production of the magnificent series of medals that commemorate the principal events of the age of Louis XIV.

Charpentier, who was long in receipt of a pension of 1200 livres from Colbert, was erudite and ingenious, but he was always heavy and commonplace. His other works include a Vie de Socrate (1650), a translation of the Cyropaedia of Xenophon (1658), and the Traité de la peinture parlante (1684).
