= Poussinists and Rubenists =

17th-century French debate about painting

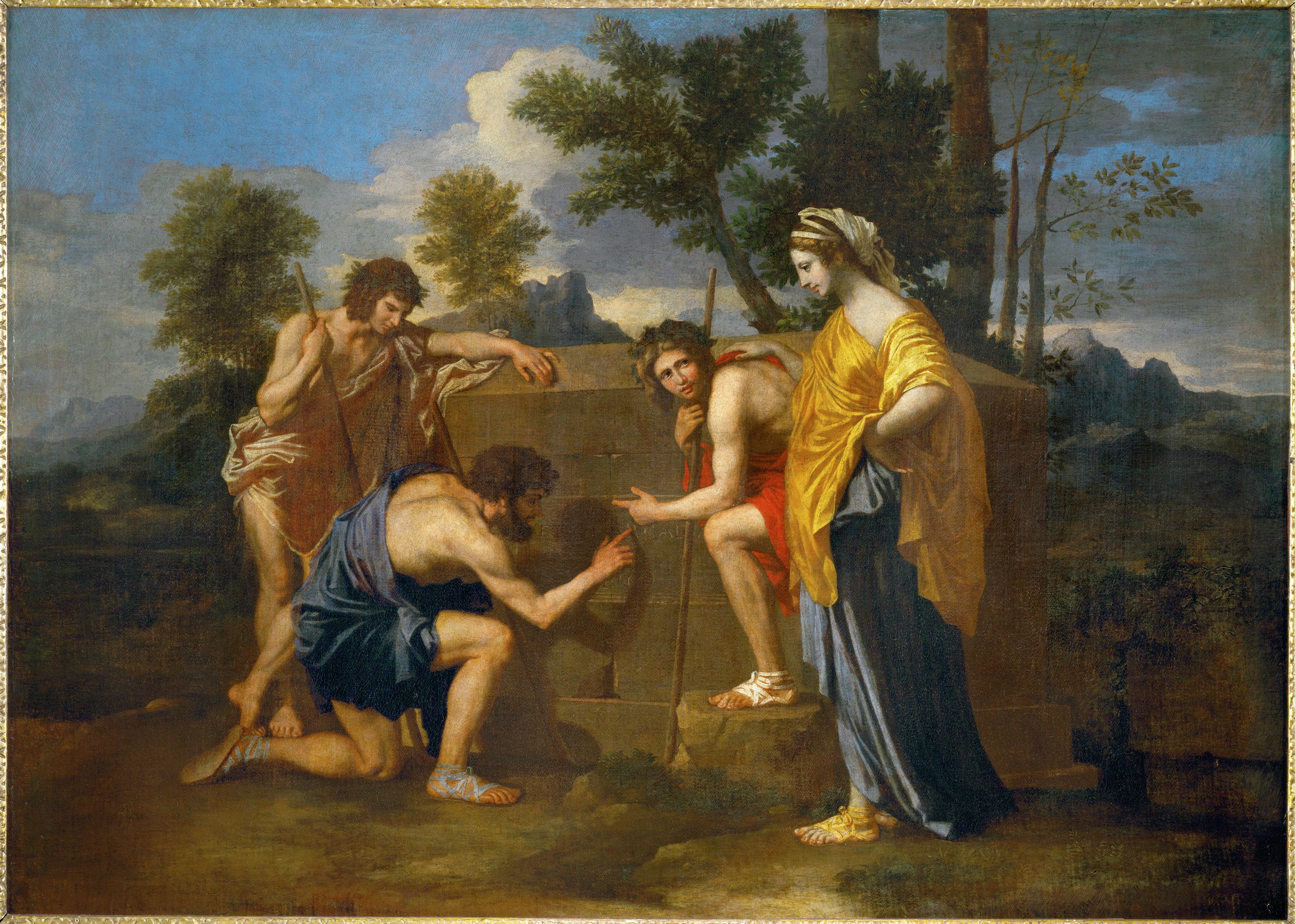
Poussin's Et in Arcadia ego (Les Bergers d’Arcadie), late 1630s.

In 1671, an argument broke out in the French Royal Academy of Painting and Sculpture in Paris about whether drawing or color was more important in painting. On one side stood the Poussinists (Fr. Poussinistes) who were a group of French artists, named after the painter Nicolas Poussin, who believed that drawing was the more important thing. On the other side were the Rubenists (Fr. Rubénistes), named after Peter Paul Rubens, who prioritized color. There was a strong nationalistic flavour to the debate as Poussin was French but Rubens was Flemish, though neither was alive at the time. After over forty years the final resolution of the matter in favor of the Rubenists was signalled when Antoine Watteau's The Embarkation for Cythera was accepted as his reception piece by the French Academy in 1717. By that time the French Rococo was in full swing.

== The argument ==
The Poussinists believed in the Platonic idea of the existence in the mind of ideal objects that could be reconstructed in concrete form by the selection, using reason, of elements from nature. For the Poussinists, therefore, color was a purely decorative addition to form and drawing (design or disegno); the use of line to depict form was the essential skill of painting. Their leader was Charles Le Brun (died 1690), Director of the Academy, and their heroes were Raphael, the Carracci, and Poussin himself, whose severe and stoical works exemplified their philosophy. Their touchstones were the forms of classical art.

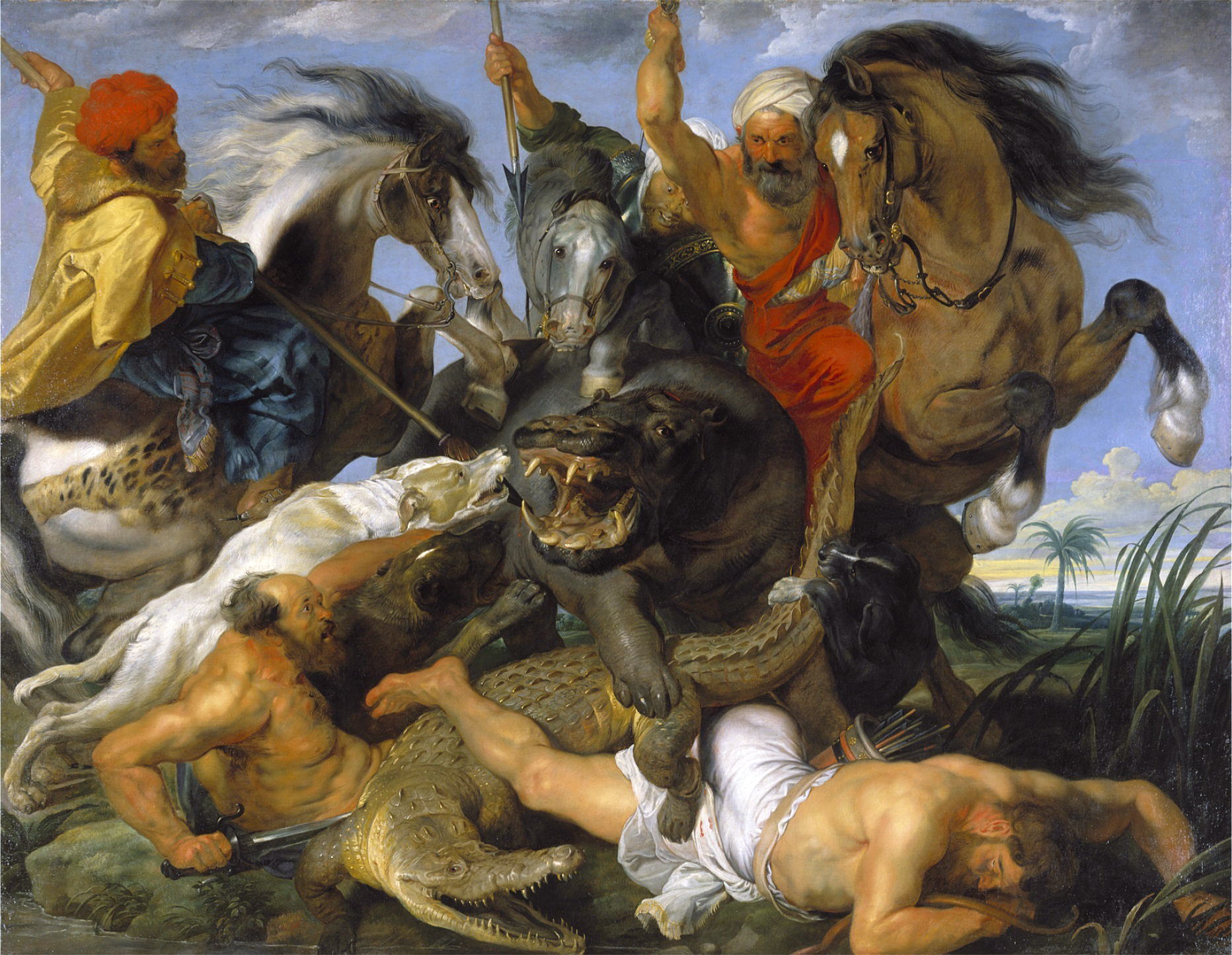
Hippopotamus Hunt, Rubens, 1616.

They were opposed by the Rubenists who believed that colour, not drawing, was superior as it was more true to nature. Their models were the works of Rubens who had prioritised the accurate depiction of nature over the imitation of classical art. The Rubenists argued that the aim of painting was to deceive the eye by creating an imitation of nature. Drawing, according to the Rubenists, although based on reason, appealed only to a few experts whereas colour could be enjoyed by everyone. The ideas of the Rubenists therefore had revolutionary political connotations as they elevated the position of the lay person and challenged the idea that had held sway since the Renaissance that painting, as a liberal art, could only be appreciated by the educated mind.

In 1672, Charles Le Brun, Chancellor of the French Academy, attempted to halt the argument by stating officially that "the function of colour is to satisfy the eyes, whereas drawing satisfies the mind." He failed, and the debate was continued in the pamphlets of Roger de Piles, who favoured the colourists and set out the arguments in his 1673 Dialogue sur le Coloris (Dialogue on Colour), and his 1677 Conversations sur la Peinture (Conversations on Painting).

The argument was similar to the argument over the merits of disegno and colore in Italy in the fifteenth century but with a particularly French character as the importance of drawing was one of the key tenets of the French Academy and any attack on it was effectively an attack on everything the Academy stood for, including its political functions in support of the King.

To a certain extent, the debate was simply about whether it was acceptable to paint purely in order to give pleasure to the viewer without the nobler purposes typical of a "history" painting.

== Resolution ==
Watteau's The Embarkation for Cythera, 1717.

A success for the Rubenists was achieved when Roger de Piles was elected a member (as an amateur) of the French Academy in 1699, and the final signal that the Rubenists had won came when Antoine Watteau's The Embarkation for Cythera was accepted as his reception piece by the Academy in 1717.

Watteau's acceptance was, however, perhaps not everything that he could have hoped for. When he applied to join the Academy, there was no suitable category for his fête galante works, so the academy simply created one rather than reject his application, describing him as a "peintre des festes galantes". While this acknowledged Watteau as the originator of that genre, and was a significant mark of acceptance both of him and his style of painting, it also prevented him being recognised as a history painter, the highest class of painter, and the only one from which the academy's professors were drawn. Charles-Antoine Coypel, the son of its then director, tellingly said: "The charming paintings of this gracious painter would be a bad guide for whoever wished to paint the Acts of the Apostles."

Watteau is considered the greatest of the Rubenist artists. Other important Rubenists include François Boucher and Jean-Honoré Fragonard. Jean-Baptiste-Siméon Chardin benefited from the newfound interest in still-life and genre painting.

== Significance ==
The debate and the overlapping development of the Rococo in eighteenth century France have been seen as a form of revival. Michael Levey has pointed out that it was during the seventeenth century that the new categories of genre, landscape and still life had become established with their emphasis on the observation of nature, and therefore the arguments of the Rubenists amounted to a revival of existing traditions of naturalism and a call for a greater discipline in painting rather than representing an attitude of general licence or laissez-faire as is sometimes assumed.

The argument also took place during the beginning of the Enlightenment and the Rubenists found support in John Locke's Essay Concerning Human Understanding (1690), which argued that all ideas derived from experience and that none were innate. Jean-Baptiste Dubos observed that what was comprehended through the mind paled compared to what was apprehended through the senses.

== See also ==
- Quarrel of the Ancients and the Moderns
