= Concrete frame =

Type of building frame

A concrete frame, also known as a concrete skeleton, is a structure composed of interconnected beams, columns, and slabs that is used to support larger structures. Due to the low cost of producing them, concrete frames are often used when building dams, bridges, and buildings. Reinforced concrete frame structures are commonly used when making concrete frames, as steel rebar's stronger tensile strength makes up for concretes tensile weakness.

== Concept ==
Connected by rigid joints, reinforced concrete frames consist of beams and columns. With the beams and columns cast in a single operation to act in unison, reinforced concrete frames provide resistance to lateral loads and gravity due to the bends in the beams and columns. Common subtypes of this frame include: Nonductile reinforced concrete frames with or without infill walls, ductile reinforced concrete frames with or without infill walls, and nonductile reinforced concrete frames with reinforced infill walls.

=== Masonry infills ===
Most prevalent type are these: RC frames with concrete infill walls, commonly referred to as dual systems, are typically used in earthquake prone areas like Turkey, Colombia, and Greece.

== Advantages ==
While being the most fire resistant material around, concrete frames are stronger, safer, less costly, and more energy efficient than steel buildings.

== See also ==
- Steel frame
- Reinforced concrete
- Framing (construction)
