= Quarrel of the Ancients and the Moderns =

Literary and artistic debate that started in the 17th century

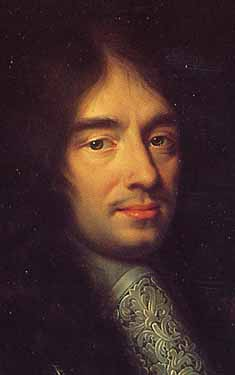
Charles Perrault, 17th-century author who represented the Modernes.

The Quarrel of the Ancients and the Moderns (French: Querelle des Anciens et des Modernes) was a debate about literary and artistic merit that stirred the French literary and artistic world for most of the 17th century, and whose echoes continued throughout the 18th century. It started with a small number of debaters in the Académie Française, and grew to encompass most of the French educated community. This debate took its historical name from the publication, starting in 1688, of Charles Perrault's Parallèle des anciens et des modernes (Parallel of the Ancients and the Moderns), whose title provided the pretext for a play on words transforming "parallèle" into "querelle" (quarrel).

== Origins of the debate ==
A central tenet of the European Renaissance was the study of culture and institutions from classical (Greek and Roman) antiquity. In contrast to the medieval scholastic emphasis on Christian theology and unchanging monarchy, Renaissance humanists launched a movement to recover, interpret, and assimilate the language, literature, learning and values of ancient Greece and Rome.

The 15th-century rediscovery and interest in ancient texts was facilitated by the introduction of the printing press around 1440, which allowed classical concepts to spread quickly and spurred revolutions in intellectual, social, and scientific pursuits. For example, in the field of architectural theory, Filippo Brunelleschi revolutionized medieval architecture after studying the remains of ancient classical buildings, analyzing the works of 1st-century BC writer Vitruvius, and understanding the mathematical principles that could be discerned from them.

This cultural rebirth of classical ideals and the following changes in scientific and artistic perspective provoked reactions from those who perceived it as a danger to the stability of Christian civilization and wished to reassert the social and political values of medieval modernity. The debate became known in France as a "quarrel", after the frequently made pun on Charles Perrault's title Parallèle des Anciens et des Modernes (Parallel between Ancients and Moderns, 1688–92); the word querelle being used in the place of parallèle.

== Debate in France ==
The quarrel between the Classics and the Moderns opposed two distinct currents:

The Ancients (Anciens), led by Nicolas Boileau-Despréaux, felt that literary creation has its roots in the fair appreciation of the heritage of antiquity. According to them, it is the test of time that makes the masterpieces, not the pedantic opinion of an elite of scholars; the worth of ancient authors from Greece and Rome is established by twenty centuries of universal admiration. While recognizing the merits of the great writers of his time (Boileau predicted that Pierre Corneille, Jean Racine and Molière would be acclaimed as geniuses in centuries to come), he argued it was also important to recognize the cumulative dimension of culture and study predecessors. The metaphor of the dwarves standing on the shoulders of giants illustrates this principle: by learning from the works of the great men of the past, it is possible to surpass them. Boileau had on his side the greatest French writers of his time, including Jean Racine, Jean de La Fontaine, François Fénelon and Jean de La Bruyère.

The Moderns (Modernes), represented by Perrault, maintained that since the France of King Louis XIV surpassed all other states in history in its political and religious perfection, it followed that the works created by 17th-century authors to the glory of King and Church were necessarily superior to anything produced in the past centuries. Therefore, they argued for a new literature adapted to the modern era, complacent towards the Court of France, respectful of 17th-century decorum, zealous for Catholic religion, renouncing the freedom of old classical authors and always seeking to celebrate the French monarchy and the Catholic Church. Perrault had on his side the Académie, the devout party, the literary salons and a host of fashionable poets—who, in the present day, are almost completely forgotten.

The gradual takeover of the literary community by political powers during the 17th century—including the creation of the Académie by Cardinal Richelieu (with Richelieu's men acting as supreme judges of all things literary), governmental censorship, the banning of controversial books (which sometimes also carried legal penalties against their authors), and the giving of pensions to authors who flattered the government—greatly favored Perrault. He had risen to prominence through the power and patronage of minister Jean-Baptiste Colbert, and his political backing bolstered the Modern party's views on artistic creation.

From 1637 to 1694, the proponents of a literature adapted to modern times raged against the "Ancients". In 1637, Corneille's Le Cid was attacked in the salons and condemned by the Académie, who accused it of anti-patriotism and affronting decorum and morality. The "Moderns" mobilized again in a 1663 attack against Molière's L'École des femmes, as well as in 1667 against Racine's Andromaque, and then in 1677 against Racine's Phèdre; all were called irreligious and outrageous to French customs and society.

In 1674, Jean Desmarets de Saint-Sorlin made a public call on his friend Perrault to "defend France" against "that heretical troop who prefers ancient works to our own." In response to this call, Perrault and his brother Claude tried to charge Boileau with the crimes of blasphemy and lèse-majesté on the grounds that he preferred the works of ancient pagan authors who wrote under a regime of liberty (in Classical Athens or the ancient Roman Republic) to the works of modern, Catholic authors who submitted to the absolute monarchy of Louis XIV.

One of the key episodes in the quarrel's development was the so-called Quarrel of the Inscriptions (querelle des inscriptions), which was triggered by Colbert's plan for a triumphal arch glorifying Louis XIV's victories to be erected on the ground that would later become the Place de la Nation in Paris. This construction project ended up being abandoned in around 1680, and the unfinished structures were demolished shortly after Louis XIV's death. The question was whether the inscriptions glorifying the King on the projected arch should be in Latin ("ancient") or French ("modern"). Antiquarian François Charpentier argued in favor of French inscriptions, and was countered by Jesuit Jean Lucas of the College de Clermont, who defended the option of Latin in an eloquent address pronounced at the College on 25 November 1676, which was published in 1677 under the title De Monumentis Publicis Latine Inscribendis Oratio.

The actual episode that took the name of La Querelle happened a decade later and lasted from 1687 to 1694, starting with the reading in the Académie of Perrault's Le siècle de Louis le Grand (The Century of Louis the Great), in which he supported the merits of the authors of the century of Louis XIV and expressed the Moderns' stance in a nutshell:

La docte antiquité dans toute sa durée
A l'égal de nos jours ne fut point éclairée.

Translation:

Learned antiquity, through all its extent,
Was never enlightened to equal our times.

The poem particularly attacks Homer, along with other classical poets, whom Perrault considered overrated and mediocre. Upon hearing this, Boileau stood up and left in anger, saying he was ashamed that a countryman of his could have spoken like that.

Between 1688 and 1692, Perrault wrote the four volumes of Parallèle des Anciens et des Modernes (Parallel between Ancients and Moderns) where he attempted to prove his ideas on literature. Boileau countered with satirical epigrams mocking Perrault's errors and, more seriously, his critical reflections on Longinus.

In 1694, after a mediation by Antoine Arnauld, the two officially reconciled, but the prolonged and heated polemic left Perrault embittered and resentful. He threatened, in the following years, to write new pamphlets against Boileau, to which Boileau replied that he was "done with Perrault" and that whatever Perrault did was "completely indifferent to him."

Racine showed himself one of the Ancients by focusing his choice of subjects on those drawn from the literature of antiquity. He also delimited his tragedies by the classical unities, derived by the classicists from Aristotle's Poetics; the unities of place, time, and action (one scene location, 24 hours, and consistent actions, respectively).

In the opening years of the 18th century, Pierre de Marivaux showed himself a Modern by establishing a new genre of theatre—unknown to the Ancients—the sentimental comedy (comédie larmoyante). In it, the impending tragedy was resolved by the end, amid reconciliations and floods of tears.

== Assessment ==
In the end, the Quarrel of the Ancients and Moderns was a cover, often a witty one, for opposing views of much deeper significance. One side was attached to the classic ideals of Greece and Rome and rejected a theory of art that turned literature into propaganda for the ruling powers, while the other contested the very idea of intellectual or aesthetic values above the authority of the King and the Church.

The renewal of interest in antiquity during the Age of Enlightenment led to a reassessment of the achievements of the classical past and ended up subjecting the Scriptures themselves to the scrutiny of critical thinkers. The attack on authority in politics and religion had analogues in the rise of scientific inquiry, and the challenge to royal and ecclesiastical authority in the literary field already announced the questioning of state and society at the time of the French Revolution, when absolute monarchy and state-sanctioned religion—the emblems of modernity—would be overthrown in the name of the ancient ideas of republic, democracy, and freedom of religion.

== Analogous 16th–20th-century debates ==
The Renaissance humanistic revolution, and its rediscovery of the intellectual achievements from classical (Greek and Roman) antiquity, brought about a divergence with medieval scholasticism and set the framework for the Scientific Revolution to come. Much as the Humanists had been preoccupied with uncovering the original meaning of language, literature and culture, so too were the natural philosophers of a century later.

René Descartes (1596–1650) and Francis Bacon (1561–1626) set the tone of a return to nature in that they wanted to restart the entire project of science and humanities by determining laws based on an examination of reality rather than relying on authority and tradition. Their questioning would lead Descartes down a path of rationalism and Bacon down a path of empiricism. This calling of the natural philosophers (later to be named scientists) of a return to classical research methods based on observation, experience and rational theorization would allow for a great shift in European scientific thought.

Since the Middle Ages, Aristotle had been the backbone of the system of Western academic knowledge officially endorsed by the Catholic Church. All philosophical discourse regarding nature was held within the parameters of Catholic-approved Aristotelianism as set by Thomas Aquinas and other Doctors of the Church, which sought to harmoniously unite the conception of God with a human understanding of nature that did not contradict Church doctrine and was assumed to be perfect and complete. Aristotle's theories on the natural order were further substantiated by Ptolemy's geography and astronomy.

This Aristotelian-Ptolemaic paradigm of scientific knowledge, particularly physics and astronomy, lasted unchallenged until the transformations in Western thought brought by the Renaissance, at which point the 16th and 17th centuries saw the union of a Copernican-Keplerian system of astronomy open up a hefty first critique which was then completed by the union of the Galilean-Newtonian system of nature. The same transformation occurred in other fields of scientific knowledge, such as the medical theories of Galen and Avicenna becoming—under the authority of the Church—the mainstay of the medieval physician's university curriculum from the 12th century onwards, and the work of Renaissance men like Janus Cornarius and Michael Servetus, who questioned and challenged the established order, bringing about the fierce reaction of the defenders of medieval modernity.

This debate in natural philosophy played a part in the Quarrel of the Ancients and the Moderns. In 17th-century France, the leaders of the Moderns, like Jacques-Bénigne Bossuet, were for medieval scholasticism, while the Ancients' party supported the new discoveries. Thus, Boileau, Racine, and François Bernier brilliantly defended, in an Arrêt Burlesque (a work of literary satire), the rebirth (in French: Renaissance) of philosophy and science, and ridiculed all those who feared changes in the status quo of modernity. According to Claude Brossette, this Arrêt destroyed a project of the University of Paris to ban Cartesianism. Boileau also wrote in defense of new forms of medical treatment, like the use of quinine, challenging the Moderns who were for Galenism and rejected any new developments.

Isaac Newton took the side of the Ancients, against Robert Hooke, when he wrote that his work relied heavily upon the work of his predecessors, famously stating:

If I have seen further it is by standing on the shoulders of Giants.

Hooke, a partisan of the Moderns, claimed that microscopy had reached perfection in modern times and that it was impossible to do better, to which Newton replied predicting that the future would bring new instruments capable of magnifying four thousand times more powerfully, eventually making even the atom visible. Maria Popova has commented that "Newton's humility sprang from an early and formative understanding of how knowledge builds upon itself, incrementally improving upon existing ideas until the cumulative adds up to the revolutionary."

Sir William Temple argued against the Modern position in his essay On Ancient and Modern Learning; therein he repeated the aforementioned commonplace, originally from Bernard of Chartres, that we see more only because we are "dwarves standing on the shoulders of giants." Temple's essay prompted a small flurry of responses. Among others, two men who took the side opposing Temple were classicist and editor Richard Bentley and critic William Wotton.

The entire discussion in England was over by 1696, but it was revisited by Jonathan Swift, who saw in the opposing camps of Ancients and Moderns a shorthand of two general orientations or ways of life. He articulated his discussion most notably in his satire A Tale of a Tub, composed between 1694 and 1697, and published in 1704 with the famous prolegomenon The Battle of the Books, long after the initial salvoes were over in France. Swift's polarizing satire provided a framework for other satirists in his circle of the Scriblerians.

The main ideas of the Moderns were expressed in early seventeenth-century Italy with the comparison between ancient and modern learning made by Alessandro Tassoni in his Pensieri, soon translated into French by the Abbé Boisrobert, and the manifesto L'Hoggidi by the Abbé Secondo Lancellotti, adapted for the French audience by Daniel de Rampalle. Two other distinguished 18th-century philosophers who wrote at length concerning the distinction between Moderns and Ancients were Giambattista Vico (e.g., his De nostri temporis studiorum ratione) and Gotthold Ephraim Lessing (for whom, the Moderns see "more," but the Ancients see "better").

In 19th-century England, highlighting the distinction between Hellenism ("Athens"/reason or "sweetness and light") and Hebraism ("Jerusalem"/faith), Matthew Arnold defended the Ancients (most notably Plato and Aristotle) against the dominant progressive intellectual trends of his times. Arnold drew attention to the fact that the great divide between Ancients and Modernists pertained to the understanding of the relation between liberty/reason and authority. Arnold saw Thomas Carlyle as the great spokesman of Hebraism and duty in an age which needed Hellenism and culture.

Countering the thrust of much of 20th-century intellectual history and literary criticism, Leo Strauss has contended that the debate between Ancients and Moderns (or the defenders of either camp) is ill-understood when reduced to questions of progress or regress. Strauss himself revived the old querelle, siding with the Ancients (against the Modernist position advocated, e.g., by Strauss's friend Alexandre Kojève).

== See also ==
- Classicism
  - Neoclassicism
- Learned medicine
- Poussinists and Rubenists
- The Two Cultures
