= Zoophorus =

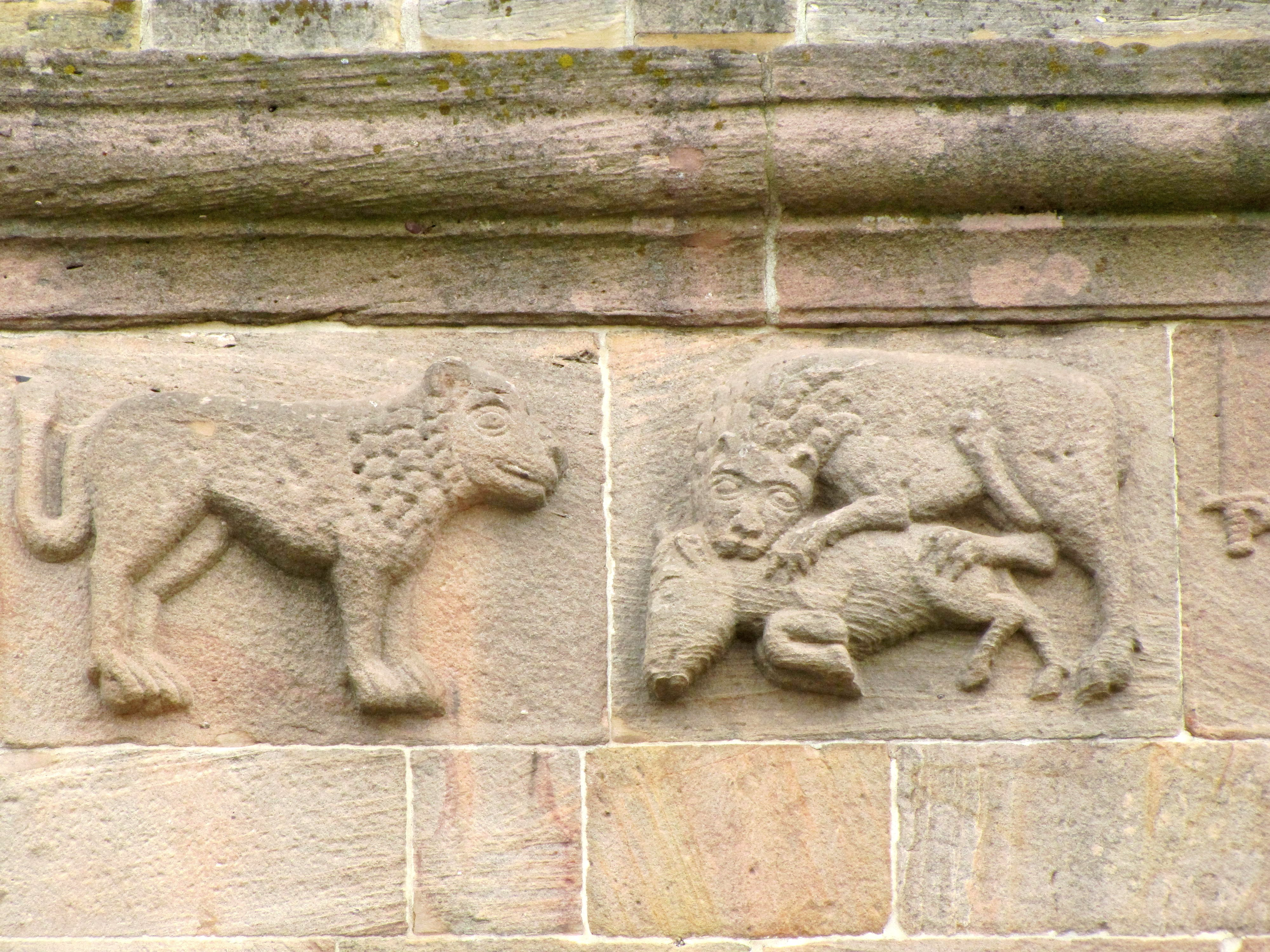
Romanesque example from Andlau in Alsace

Zoophorus (Ancient Greek: ζῳοφόρος) and Zophorus (Ancient Greek: ζῳφόρος), meaning "bearing animals", was the Ancient Greek term for a decorated frieze between the architrave and cornice, typically with a continuous bas-relief. A zoophoric column is a pillar supporting the figure of an animal. The word is rarely used in modern English architectural writing.
