= Cesare Crispolti =

Italian Renaissance scholar

- Born: January 1563; Perugia, Papal States
- Died: 21 April 1608 (aged 45); Perugia, Papal States
- Education: University of Perugia
- Occupations: Intellectual; Historian; Writer; Jurist
- Parent(s): Ranieri Crispolti and Madonna Crispolti (née Rubina)
- Writing career
- Language: Italian
- Notable works: Idea dello scolare Perugia Augusta
- Literary movement: Renaissance

Cesare Crispolti (January 1563 – 21 April 1608) was an Italian Renaissance scholar and writer. Crispolti was a poet, musician, historian, literary theorist and refined art collector.

== Biography ==
Cesare di Raniero di Pier Antonio Crispolti was one of the most well-known figures in Perugia in the late 1500s and early 1600s. He was born in Perugia in 1563 and entered the seminary there in 1577, studying theology, music, and the humanities under the famous scholar Marco Antonio Bonciari. In 1586 he was appointed subdeacon and canon of the cathedral chapter and two years later he was ordained priest. On 19 August 1591 he graduated as doctor 'in both laws' at the University of Perugia. From 1592 to 1606 he was Principe of the Perugian Accademia degli Insensati where he gave numerous lectures. He was also a member of the Accademia degli Unisoni. Crispolti was a member of the collegio dei giureconsulti (college of Jurists) of Perugia and in 1603 he served as judge of the city. He died in Perugia on 21 April 1608. Crispolti was acquainted with Caravaggio and may have been the first owner of the famous painting Boy Peeling Fruit.

== Works ==
Crispolti published only one book during his lifetime, L'Idea dello Scolare, a notable contribution to pedagogical thought, integrated into the theories of the Counter-Reformation. However, for most of his life the history of Perugia was the main focus of his interests and resulted in two works: Perugia Augusta descritta, published posthumously in 1648, and Fatti e guerre dei Perugini così esterne come civili dal pontificato di Innocenzo VIlI a quello di Sisto V, remained in manuscript form. Crispolti's manuscript academic lessons are kept in the Biblioteca Augusta of Perugia.

== Bibliography ==
- Allan Atlas, "The Accademia degli Unisoni: A Music Academy in Renaissance Perugia," in A Musical Offering: Essays in Honor of Martin Bernstein, ed. Edward H. Clinkscale and Claire Brook (New York: Pendragon Press, 1977), pp. 5–23.
- Sebastiani, Floriana (1979–80). "L'"idea dello scolare" di Cesare Crispolti". Pedagogia e Vita. 6: 591–599.
- Volpi, Roberto (1984). "CRISPOLTI, Cesare". Dizionario Biografico degli Italiani (in Italian). Vol. 30: Cosattini–Crispolto. Rome: Istituto dell'Enciclopedia Italiana. ISBN 978-88-12-00032-6.
- Laura Teza, ed. (2001). Raccolta delle cose segnalate di Cesare Crispolti. La più antica guida artistica di Perugia (1597). Leo S. Olschki.
- Sacchini, Lorenzo (2015). "Dalla solitudine della villa alla conversazione della città. Itinerari dell'ozio in una triade di lezioni accademiche secentesche di Cesare Crispolti". Annali d'Italianistica. 32: 137–154. JSTOR 43894769.
