= Rerum italicarum scriptores =

Medieval Italian history source publication

Rerum italicarum scriptores ab anno æræ christianæ quingentesimo ad millesimumquingentesimum is a collection of texts which are sources for Italian history from the 6th to the 15th century, compiled in the 18th century by Ludovico Antonio Muratori.

Muratori's work became a landmark in European historiographical methodology. He set out to construct a history based on the careful accumulation and sifting of evidence. It was published between 1723 and 1751 in twenty-eight folio volumes by the Milanese Palatine Society with financial support from a number of aristocrats including Filippo Argelati and Carlo Archinto.

== Title Page ==
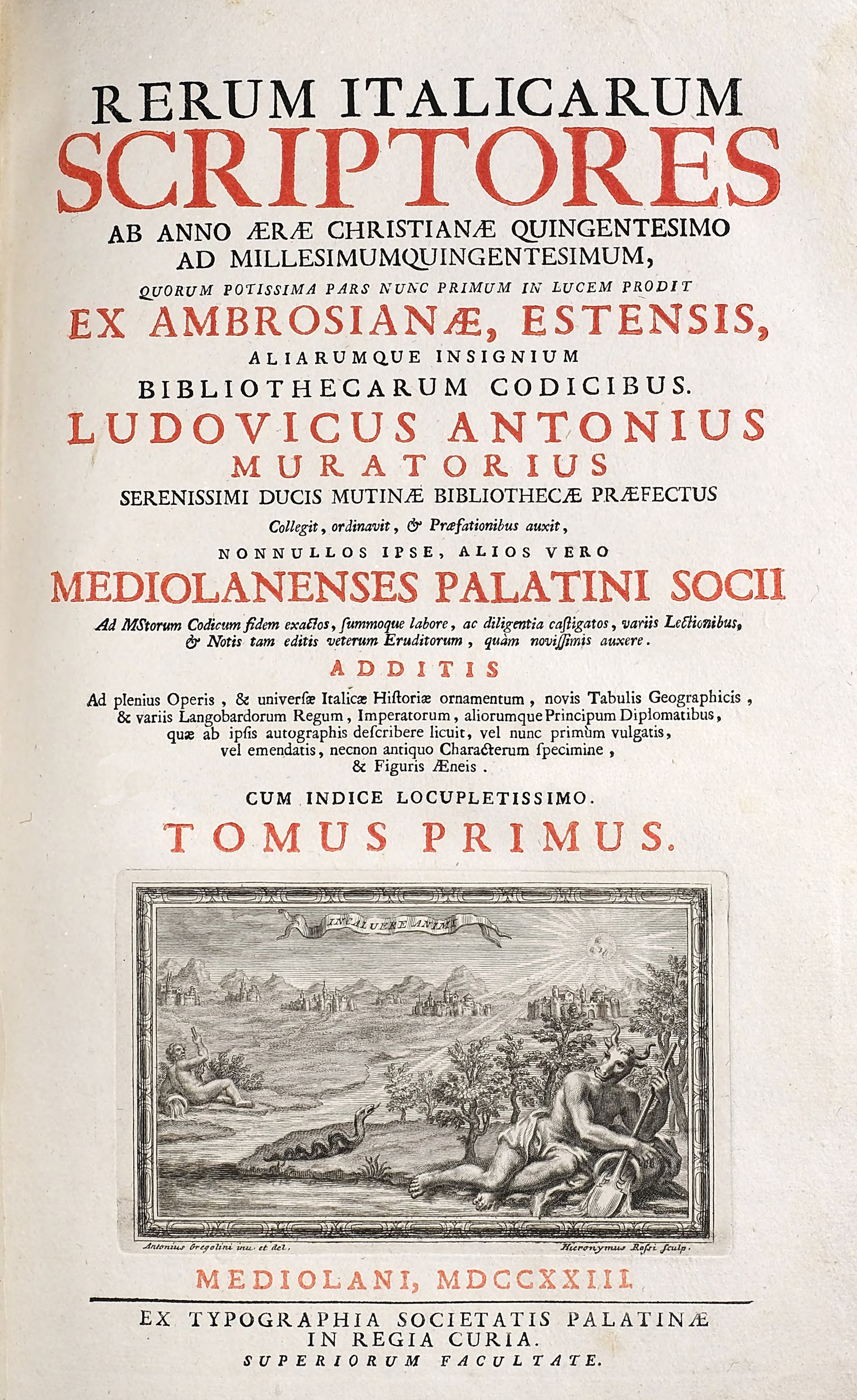
Title page of the first volume of Muratori's Rerum italicarum scriptores published in Milan in 1723

Writers on Italian Events
from the five-hundredth year of the Christian era
to the year fifteen-hundred,
the greater part of which is now coming to light
from the codexes
of the Ambrosian, Estense,
and other significant libraries.
Ludovico Antonio Muratori
prefect of the most serene Duke of Modena's library,
collected, organised and expanded with prefaces,
some by himself, others by associates of the
Milanese Palatine Society
from the faithfully copied manuscript codex, and with intense effort diligently corrected, and with various explanations and notes from both ancient and more recent scholars.
Adding
to a more complete work and illustration of a universal history of Italy, new geographical tables, and various lists of the Lombard Kings, Emperors, and other classes of Princes, which the same documents permit to be described, now first published or corrected, not to mention the ancient style of characters and representations of Æneas.
With the most eloquent index.

== The project ==
=== Background ===
Having earlier worked in the Biblioteca Ambrosiana where he began to collect details on historic manuscripts, Muratori was employed by the Este family, Dukes of Modena, as librarian and archivist with the special duty of finding useful documents to justify the territorial claims of the family. This research gave Muratori the inspiration to widen this perspective. He developed the efforts made earlier by Niccolò Machiavelli and Francesco Guicciardini to establish a systematic approach towards the collection of documents supporting historiography that eventually led to the birth of national histories, such as the Monumenta Germaniae Historica in Germany.

Much of the background to Muratori's work remains captured in his daily correspondence. Apostolo Zeno, based at the Biblioteca Marciana in Venice, had first suggested printing a collection manuscripts documenting Italian history, as Heinrich Meibom had started in Germany, "and others have done the same of those of England, France and Spain". In 1702, he and Muratori shared a list of manuscript codexes they were aware of, but Zeno was eventually appointed to the Imperial Library in Vienna and they made no further progress. The House of Este was connected to the House of Welf in Hannover, and this led to Muratori's collaboration with Gottfried Leibnitz. In 1714, Muratori began a series of visits to various libraries across Italy, furnished with letters of commendation from the Duke of Modena and King George I of Great Britain.

Muratori never left Modena after 1717 and by 1719 he had amassed a collection of mainly manuscript histories ready to be printed in four volumes. He was visited by bookseller and publisher Filippo Argelati from Bologna who took up an invitation to help publish the material.

=== Formation of Società Palatina ===
They had difficulty finding a suitable printer in Modena, and an important factor in choosing a printer was the need to avoid the censorship by the Church or the civil authorities. They considered printing in Geneva, or giving the work to Pieter van der Aa in Leiden, but were concerned about the distances involved and the transmission of the texts. They also approached the authorities in Turin, but they were slow to respond. Argelati traveled to Milan and promoted the work to Count Carlo Archinto, a prominent patron of the arts. Archinto, to raise the necessary funds, formed a society of Milanese noblemen under the name of Società Palatina, each of whom subscribed a considerable sum. Milan was also attractive due to the presence of many source texts in the Biblioteca Ambrosiana and its tradition of scholarship. With these means, Argelati was able to start production of the work, which was eventually published in 25 folio volumes (28 parts) between 1723 and 1751 in Milan. Much of the material had previously been transcribed and published, but Muratori was able to access unpublished manuscript codexes in the libraries he was associated with, and to correct earlier transcriptions. Each item was prefaced by a scholarly commentary.

=== Creating a printing house ===
Although Muratori and Argelati had chosen Milan for the production of the work, it did not have a printing industry: there was no-one skilled in engraving or capable of casting the typefaces. The subscribers' funds were used to create a printing works from scratch and Governor Colloredo provided space for the presses within the royal palace. In order to ensure that they remained independent of the Holy Office, they could not source the type from Venice, which was the centre of printing in Italy, so new type was cast with matrices procured from Holland. Argelati was an experienced publisher and promoter, and his skills and self-belief drove the project forward, though not without tension with his colleagues. This was partly due to his poor administration which obscured the true financial commitment of his aristocratic sponsors. By February 1722 a few proof pages had been printed to everyone's satisfaction. Good quality paper had been sourced locally, though it was a challenge to acquire the quantities they needed. A major fire broke out in the palace at the end of 1723 and although they managed to rescue the presses, some of the printed sheets were damaged.

We have lost a great many typefaces, various sheets, and the greatest damage is not being able to print for some time, and meanwhile having to pay the men.

— Argetati to Muratori, 22 Dec 1723

In February 1725 they were still suffering from a shortage of typeface and were able to operate only two of their three presses. Local flooding had also destroyed the paper mill and it took several years to return to full production.

These financial pressures led to calls for the more interesting codexes to be published immediately, but Muratori stuck to his policy of placing them in chronological order and including texts which had already been transcribed and printed by others to create a complete record. His main problem was the delays involved in achieving access to the source materials, but he thought it better to keep to the chronological thread throughout the whole series and accommodate delayed chronicles by adding a second part to some of the volumes.

=== Difficulties accessing the texts ===
At the time, Italy was partitioned into many states, some autonomous and others subject to Vienna, Spain, Savoy and the Pope. Not all libraries were allowed to contribute to the project, and even so there was a risk that the manuscripts (or their transcripts) would be stolen or seized by customs officials when in transit. Some sources demanded hefty bonds in case of loss, and in other cases they were transmitted under diplomatic protection. In Milan the project had the sponsorship of the emperor (Charles VI) and the governor (Hieronymus von Colloredo). Each of the principal supporters eventually had a volume dedicated to them, including the republics of Genoa and Lucca and Venice. Despite entreaties to the authorities in Turin, including the promise of a volume dedicated to the Savoy monarch, access to Istoria di Saluzzo was denied as "the chronicle was written by a pen in those partial times of the ancient margraves of Saluzzo, implacable enemies of the Royal House of Savoy".

=== Avoiding censorship ===
The discovery of the printing press has ... been a great impediment, in certain countries, to the truth, which once came out more freely in manuscripts.

— L.A. Muratori, Riflessioni sopra il buon gusto, 1708.

Although Muratori was a deeply religious man and inclined to defer to the ecclesiastical and civil authorities, he also deplored the abuses of censorship. He had earlier experienced problems getting his work published in Venice and had to turn to Paris. (He had been also criticised by the Inquisitor of Modena for dedicating a work to "the heretic King George of England". (Note: There is an anonymous letter to the Inquisitor of Modena reproaching him for his laxity in not referring two of Muratori's works to the Holy Office; the 'scandalous' Antichità Estensi (Antiquity of the house of Este) dedicated to the 'heretic King George of England and illegitimate possessor and usurper of those kingdoms'; and the other 'much worse' work De ingeniorum moderatione ... (On the moderation of reason in religious matters), 'full of heresies, beginning with the title'.)) Some of his collaborators thought that the volumes should be submitted to the Governor and the Holy Office, but Muratori responded that "truth and sincerity are the soul of history" and was diligent in ensuring that nothing had been altered in the printing process. Eutropius' Roman history (Vol. 1) was less than complementary about some of the popes, and after the first two volumes had been released the Roman Curia recommended that they should be banned. Muratori worked patiently behind the scenes with the archbishop and the governor to get the Curia to withdraw the demand.

=== Use of the vernacular ===
There was also a debate whether to publish only Latin translations of vernacular texts, and it was agreed to use translations where the vernacular, such as Venetian or Neapolitan, was difficult even for Italians to read.

An important principle for Muratori was that all texts should be reassessed where multiple sources were available, and this included previously published material. Many communities were concerned that their versions might be undermined and give advantage to a competing community, and from time to time the civil authorities had to instruct monastic libraries to cooperate. The work itself was very time-consuming and relied, in the main, on voluntary contributions.

=== Authenticity ===
Muratori was well aware that many ancient manuscripts were, in fact, forgeries. Daniel Paperbroch, drafting the Bollandist Acta Sanctorum, set the rules of forensic paleography and Jean Mabillon in De re diplomatica (1681) showed the way through the obscure forest of written sources. Muratori was aware that "no age, no kingdom ever existed in Europe in the past, which could boast of being immune to impostors using the written word". When he personally carried out the work of transcription, collation, and critical edition, he rarely made mistakes, but when he was forced to rely on the collaboration of local scholars and could not scrutinise documents with his own eyes he incurred some errors. He was taken in by certain southern forgers who were keen to protect the reputation of their states and cities. Giovanni Bernardino Tafuri (1695–1760), a well-educated nobleman from Nardò, succeeded in fobbing off Muratori with two outright forgeries, the Ragionamento (Reasoning) of Angelo Tafuri of Nardò and the Chronicon Neritinum.

=== Maps ===
Muratori's opening preface promises three innovative maps:

- "in the time of the aging Roman Empire" (published in Vol. 1);
- “in, as they say, the Middle Ages, including of course the Lombard kingdom” (Vol. 10); and
- “the restored fortunes of the Italians under the Emperors and the other Italian princes” (not published).

Muratori states that the foldout map at the front of Vol. 10 shows "at a glance" Italy under the Lombard and Frankish kings with new provinces and cities having been established, and ancient castles, towns, and cities blotted out. It is known to have been drawn by Gasparo Beretti and is complemented by a dissertatio chorographica about medieval Italy. Beretti's map has room for much detail. It mirrors many moments, rather than just one, of the period it is designed to portray but is rich in information and guidance about the boundaries separating the diverse entities present in early medieval Italy. Lombard and Byzantine duchies are there, along with the eastern and western parts of the Lombard kingdom and the Byzantine Exarchate and south Italian possessions.

=== Legacy ===
Muratori's project to collect, edit and publish key source documents from the Middle Ages in chronological order was copied by other nations.

In Germany, the Monumenta Germaniae Historica was published in Hanover with the first volume appearing in 1826, edited by Georg Heinrich Pertz and subsequently Georg Waitz. It is a comprehensive series of primary sources, both chronicle and archival, covering Northwestern and Central European history from the end of the Roman Empire to 1500.

In Britain, the Chronicles and Memorials of Great Britain and Ireland during the Middle Ages (Latin: Rerum Britannicarum medii aevi scriptores), widely known as the Rolls Series, a major collection of British and Irish historical materials and primary sources, was published with government support in 253 volumes between 1858 and 1911.

== Contents of Muratori's edition (RIS) ==
Allegorical frontispiece in volumes 1–24. Illustration by Agostino Massucci, engraving by Giovanni Girolamo Frezza.

=== Volume 1 ===
Muratori, Lodovico Antonio, ed. (1723). Rerum italicarum scriptores (in Latin). Vol. 1. Milan: Societatis Palatinae.

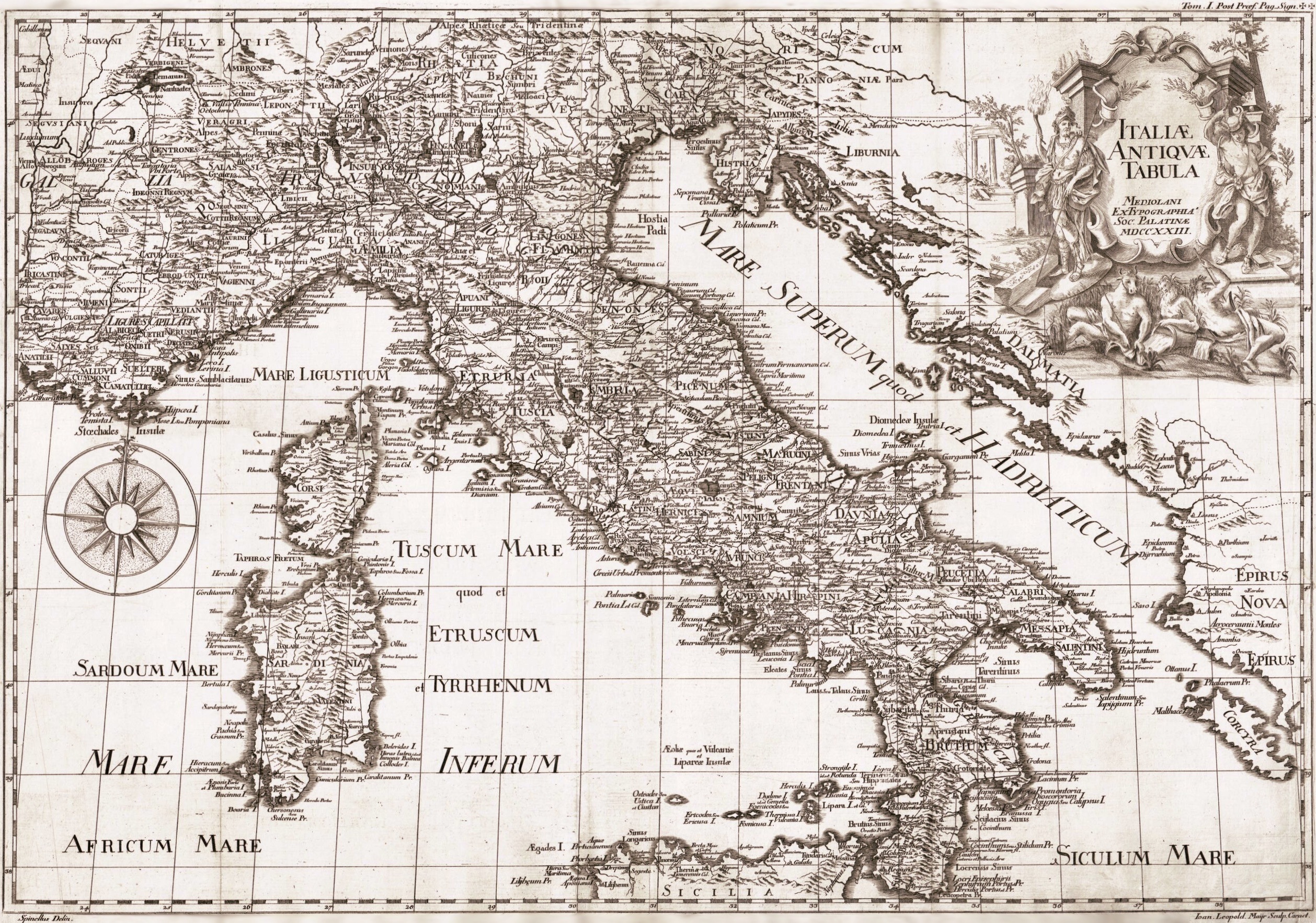
Map of Italy from Rerum italicarum scriptores Vol. 1

- Preliminaries:
  - Dedication to Charles VI, with an intaglio portrait and engraved dedication by Girolamo Ferroni,
  - Letter to the reader by Argelati;
  - Preface by Muratori;
  - An introduction from the publishers on the use of maps (de tabula geographica)
  - Fold-out map of the Italian peninsular in the late Roman period drawn by Giovanni Giacomo Spinelli, (Note: Giovanni Giacomo Spinelli was a surveyor, cartographer and engraver who worked in Udine and the region between 1662 and 1714. His drawings range from hydraulics to structures as well as maps.) possibly based on an earlier map by De l'Isle.
- Historia Miscella, comprising the Summary of Roman History (Breviarium Historiae Romanae) of Eutropius, which Paul the Deacon, at the request of Adelberga, wife of the Duke of Beneventan, extended from the Valentinian Empire down to the time of Justinian, and continued by Landolfo Sagace, or others, to 806, from manuscripts in the Biblioteca Ambrosiana and the edition of Henricus Canisius.
- Landolfo Sagace: Extension to Historia Miscella (Additamentum ad Historiam Miscellam), from manuscripts in the Biblioteca Ambrosiana.
- Jordanes: The origin and deeds of the Getae (Historia De Getarum) or origin of the Goths, from manuscripts in the Biblioteca Ambrosiana edited by Giuseppe Antonio Sassi. (Note: Based the work of Orazio Bianchi, but rejected as too verbose by Muratori.)
- Jordanes: Of the succession of kingdoms and times (de Regnorum, & temporum successione), from the collection of Nicolò Biancardi.
- Procopius of Caesarea: The Gothic War (Historiarum sui temporis de bello Gothico), Book IV, extracted from the Claude Maltret complete edition of Procopius' Historiae Byzantinae with Hugo Grotius' explanation of Gothic, Vandal and Lombard names & expressions.
- Agathias: Excerpts from the Histories extracted by Grotius.
- Paul the Deacon: History of the Lombards (de Gestis Langobardorum), Book VI, based on the printed version of Friedrich Lindenbrog and manuscripts in the Biblioteca Ambrosiana and at Monza by Orazio Bianchi.

=== Volume 1, Second Part ===
Muratori, Lodovico Antonio, ed. (1723). Rerum italicarum scriptores (in Latin). Vol. 1, pars secunda. Milan: Societatis Palatinae.

- The laws of the Lombards in chronological order (Leges Langobardicae secundum ordinem) from manuscripts in the Biblioteca Ambrosiana and Biblioteca Estense.
- Paul the Deacon: Fragment of Lombard history (Fragmentum Langobardicae historiae), previously published by Marquard Freher.
- The Monk of Nonantola: Foundation of the Monastery of Nonantola under Aistulf (Opusculum de fundatione celeberrimi monasterii Nonantulani) from the edition by Jean Mabillon.
- Anon. (9th- or 10th-century): The situation of the City of Milan (Opusculum de situ civitatis Mediolani) together with a list of archbishops, from a manuscript in the Biblioteca Ambrosiana.
- The order of the suffragan bishops of Milan, and list of archbishops from Barnabas to 1251, from a manuscript in the Library of the Metropolitan Chapter of Milan.
- Historical extracts from the oldest manuscript calendar in the Biblioteca Ambrosiana.
- Giovanni Battista Caruso: (Note: Italian historian based in Polizzi Generosa (1673–1724) where he published Historiae Saracenico-Siculae varia monumenta in 1720.) Various records of Saracenic-Sicilian history (Historiae Saracenico-Siculae varia monumenta):
  - Chronicon Saracenico-Siculum Cantabrigiense;
  - Abulfeda (Abu al-Fida Ismail ibn'Ali): Excerpts from a concise history of humanity (Tarikh al-Mukhtasar fi Akhbar al-Bashar) translated into Latin as Excerpta ex chronologia universali by Marco Dobelio; (Note: Murqus al-Du'äbilï al-Kurdï (c. 1572 – 1654), known in Spain as Marcos Dobelio, was probably a Muslim convert to Christianity of Kurdish origin who had lived for some time in Aleppo. He taught Arabic at the University of La Sapienza in Rome in about 1597. He worked in Granada from 1610.)
  - More on the Saracens in Sicily (Continuatio Historiae Saracenorum in Sicilia) from Asmodferi, by Alkadì Sciohabadin held in the Escurial library, translated by Marco Dobelio;
  - Theodosius, (Note: Theodosius of Syracuse, a grammarian (teacher) and monk as evidenced on the Greek title of the work: Θεοδοσίου μοναχοῦ τοῦ καὶ γραμματικοῦ ἐπιστολὴ πρὸς Λέοντα ἀρχιδιάκονον περὶ τῆς ἁλώσεως Συρακούσης.) Letter concerning the Siege of Syracuse (Epistola Theodosii monachi ad Leonem archidiaconum de Syracusanae urbis expugnatione) previously published in Sicilia sacra in 1644;
  - John the Deacon, Martyrdom of St. Procopius, Bishop of Taormina (Martyrium Sancti Procopii episcopi Tauromenii);
  - Conrad the Dominican (Convent of St. Catharine at Palermo), A Brief Chronicle from the Year 1027 to 1283, previously published in Catana sacra;
  - Hazì Aliphè Musfafà (Kâtip Çelebi), excerpts from Taqwīm at-Tawārikh (Chronological Tables) concerning the Saracens in Italy from the 1697 Italian translation by Gian Rinaldo Carli.
- John the Deacon: Deeds of the Neapolitan Bishops (Chronicon episcoporum Sanctae Neapolitanae Ecclesiae) to 872, from a manuscript in the Vatican Library.
- History of the St Vincent at Volturno Abbey (Chronicon Vulturnense) from 703 to 1071, from a manuscript in the collection of Francesco Barberini.
- Records relating to Ravenna (Spicilegium Ravennatis Historiae) from manuscripts in the Biblioteca Estense and Ravenna.

=== Volume 2 ===
Muratori, Lodovico Antonio, ed. (1723). Rerum italicarum scriptores (in Latin). Vol. 2. Milan: Societatis Palatinae.

- Dedication to Hieronymus von Colloredo, Governor of the Duchy of Milan with portrait by Francesco Pavona.
- Andreas Agnellus: Lives of the bishops of Ravenna (Vitae Pontificum Ravennatum) originally extracted from manuscripts in the Biblioteca Estense and published by Benedetto Bacchini, now revised.
- Pope Paschal I: Bull addressed to Archbishop Petronax of Ravenna (Palatini Socii in Bulla Paschalis Papae I ad Petronacium Ravennae Archiepiscopum) confirming the privileges of the church of Ravenna.
- History of the Lombard princes (Historia principum Langobardorum), compiled and annotated by Camillo Pellegrino:
  1. History of the Lombards in Benevento from Paul the Deacon to the year 888;
  2. On Prince Sicard of Benevento, and the Pactum Sicardi of 836 between the Greek Duchy of Naples represented by its bishop, John, and its duke, Andrew II;
  3. On Prince Radelchis of Benevento and the division of Benevento with Prince Siconulf of Salerno in 851;
  4. Monks of Cassino: History of the Lombards in Cis-Tyberina from c. 840 – c. 875;
  5. Anon.: Lombard chronicle of the Abbey of St. Benedict listing the rulers of Benevento, and the abbots of Monte Cassino from its re-eatablishment at the time of Duke Gregory and Abbot Petronax (720) until the time of Abbot Bertharius;
  6. John of Capua, archdeacon and abbot of Cassino: Chronicle of the last counts of Capua;
  7. Anon. of Benevento: Fragment of the History of the Lombards in Benevento from 891 to 893;
  8. Anon. of Salerno: History of the Lombard Princes of Benevento, part 7;
  9. Anon. of Salerno: Elegy for Pandulf, prince of Capua, Benvento and Salerno;
  10. Rule of Pandulf Prince of Capua;
  11. Burial inscriptions of some Lombard princes;
  12. Certificate of judgement concerning land and a farm in Matalonia for the Abbey and Church of St. Michael Archangel;
  13. Certificate of judgement concerning a certain water course for the city and citizens of Suessa;
  14. Anon. of Salerno: Chronicle of several dukes & princes of Benvenuto, & princes of Salerno. With an appendix of the dukes of Apulia;
  15. Anon. of Santa Sofia, Benevento: Chronicle of the dukes and princes of Benvenuto.
- Anastasius the Librarian: The Monte Cassino Chronicle (Epitome chronicorum Casinensium), from a manuscript in Monte Cassino abbey.
- Anon.: Elegy praising Berengario I (Carmen panegyricum de laudibus Berengarii augusti), first published by Adrien de Valois and revised by Gottfried Wilhelm Leibniz.
- Proceedings of a synod at Pavia (Palatini socii In synodum Ticinensem) confirming Guy of Spoleto's election as King of Italy at the end of 888.
- Liutprand of Cremona: Legation to the Byzantine emperor Nicephorus Phocas (Historia, eiusque legatio ad Nicephorum Phocam imp.) in 968, with notes by Henricus Canisius.
- Annali Bertiniani: Chronicle of the Frankish kings (Annales Regum Francorum) from death of Charles Martel until 882, from a manuscript in the Abbey of Saint Bertin edited by Heribert Rosweyde and Jean Boland, with an appendix by another writer from 883 to 900, which was edited by André Duchesne.

=== Volume 2, Second Part ===
Muratori, Lodovico Antonio, ed. (1726). Rerum italicarum scriptores (in Latin). Vol. 2, pars altera. Milan: Societatis Palatinae.

- Ermoldus Nigellus: An elegy in honour of Emperor Louis the Pious (De rebus gestis Ludovici Pii augusti), from 781 to 826, from a manuscript in the Vienna (Vindobona) Imperial Court Library
- Peter Lambeck: Annales Lambeciani, a history of the Franks, from a manuscript in the Imperial Court Library.
- Fragment concerning a Roman synod held in 863, from a manuscript in the Biblioteca Ambrosiana.
- Anon.: A bishop's prayer from a Roman synod in 864, from a manuscript in the Biblioteca Ambrosiana.
- Proceedings of a council at Pavia in 876 (Acta concilii Ticinensis anno DCCCLXXVI) to elect Charles the Bald as King of Italy, from a manuscript in the Biblioteca Ambrosiana edited by Giuseppe Antonio Sassi.
- Anon. of Salerno: Paralipomena (Note: From Greek: 'things omitted') an extension of the Salerno Chronicle (c. 760 – c. 860), from a manuscript in the collection of Eustachio Caracciolo.
- Gregory of Catino: History of the Abbey of Farfa (Chronicon Farfense) from 681 to 1104, from a manuscript in the Caracciolo collection.
- In praise of Milan (Carmen vetustissimum de laudibus Mediolani); On the death Charlemagne (Rythmus in obitum Caroli Magni augusti); Description of the city of Modena (Mutinensis urbis descriptio), from a Veronese manuscript.
- Anon.: Additional fragments from the Novalesa Abbey Chronicle, written c. 1060, published in part by Duchesne and completed from a Malaspina manuscript.
- John Bernard: History of the Abbey of San Clemente a Casauria (Chronicon Casauriense) to 1182 originally published by Duchesne from the Royal French Library. (Note: An English translation is available at "The Chronicle of St. Clement, Casauria, by John Berard" (PDF). Translated by Loud, G. A. Institute for Medieval Studies, University of Leeds.)
- Two ancient calendars, one from the Biblioteca Ambrosiana and the other from the collection of Camillo Sitoni.
- John the Deacon and Peter the Subdeacon:The life of St. Athanasius, bishop of Naples (Vita Sancti Athanasii episcopi Neapolitani), published by Wilhelm Cuypers.
- Liutprand of Pavia: Alternate readings of his History (ariantes lectionis ad Historiam Liutprandi ), from a manuscript in the Imperial Library
- Anon.: Poem describing Verona c. 790, previously published by Jean Mabillon.
- Anon. of Salerno: Amendments to the Paralipomena (Emendationes paralipomenon), from a manuscript in the Vatican Library.

=== Volume 3 ===
Muratori, Lodovico Antonio, ed. (1723). Rerum italicarum scriptores (in Latin). Vol. 3. Milan: Societatis Palatinae.

- Dedication to Antonio Folch de Cardona, (Note: Antonio Folch de Cardona, Bishop of Valencia, was exiled in Vienna after the War of the Spanish Succession where he built up a major library. The portrait by Daniele Antonio Bertoli is the only known likeness.) Bishop of Valencia, with portrait by Daniele Antonio Bertoli.
- Anastasius the Librarian: Lives of the Roman pontiffs (Vitae romanorum pontificum) from St. Peter to Stephen VI based on the Liber Pontificalis published 1718–1735 by Francesco Bianchini
- Lives of certain Roman Pontiffs (Vitae nonnullorum pontificum romanorum), which extends the Liber Pontificalis from Leo IX through to John XXII (excluding Victor II and all of the antipopes) based on manuscripts in the major libraries. Most pontiffs have entries transcribed from more than one source. The principal sources are:
  - Cardinal Nicolás Rossell of Aragon (1314–1362), who was based at the Papal court in Avignon and compiled Romanorum pontificium gesta, is the author of 17 entries;
  - Bernard Gui (1261–1331) is the source of 37 entries;
  - Pandulf of Pisa (fl 1039 – 1139) on Paschal II, Gelasius II, Callistus II and Honorius II, who were his contemporaries (ten other entries carry his name but are not now thought to be his);
  - Wibert, archdeacon of Toul, on Leo IX, his contemporary;
  - Paul Bernried on Gregory VII, a 'near contemporary';
  - Étienne Baluze (1630–1718), a French scholar, on Innocent III;
  - 21 other anonymous manuscripts.

=== Volume 3, Second Part ===
Muratori, Lodovico Antonio, ed. (1723). Rerum italicarum scriptores (in Latin). Vol. 3, pars altera. Milan: Societatis Palatinae.

- Amalrico Auger (Note: Amaric Augerius, was a 14th-century historian and theologian. His only known work, Actus romanorum pontificum a primo usque ad Johannem papam XXII sive annum 1321, is an alphabetical chronicle of the popes, written at Avignon in 1362.), Flodoard of Reims, Pandulf of Pisa, et al: Lives of the Roman Pontiffs from St. Peter to Innocent VIII, including letters from several Pontiffs in the Codex epistolaris Carolinus to Frankish kings.
- Gaspare Pontani: (Note: Gaspare Pontani (fl. 1468–1515) lived in Rome in the Ponte district, and was a Capitoline notary (Notario del Nantiporto). The identification of Pontani escaped Muratori and was established by Diomede Toni in 1907 (see RIS2, Vol. 3 Part 2, below).) Diary of the City of Rome (Diarium Romanae urbis) from 1481 to 1492. (Note: The diary covers the pontificates of Sixtus IV and Innocent VIII and covers the violence between the Colonna and Orsini factions, especially in the author's neighbourhood.)
- Stefano Infessura: Diary of the City of Rome (Diarium Romanae urbis) from 1294 to Alessandro VI).

=== Volume 4 ===
Muratori, Lodovico Antonio, ed. (1724). Rerum italicarum scriptores (in Latin). Vol. 4. Milan: Societatis Palatinae.

- Dedication to Prince Eugene of Savoy with portrait by Andrea Toresani.
- Arnolf of Milan: Contemporary events (Rerum sui temporis), book V (1077), published by Leibniz and updated from manuscripts in the Bioblioteca Estense and the Library of the Metropolitan Chapter of Milan.
- Landulf of Milan: History of Milan (Historiae Mediolanensis), Book VI, extracted by Bianchi from manuscripts in Library of the Metropolitan Chapter of Milan.
- Giovanni Pietro Puricelli: Whether St Ambrose permitted his clergy to marry (Utrum Sanctus Ambrosius Clero suo mediolanensi permiserit, ut virgini nubere semel posset), a dissertation establishing that the view put forward by Landulf and others that Ambrose approved of clergy marriage was incorrect. It includes a catalogue of the archbishops of Milan.
- Two brief chronicles of the kings of Italy (Cronica duo brevia Regum Italiae) from a manuscript in the Biblioteca Ambrosiana, one an account of the Frankish kings (dated c. 1028) and the other of the law of the Lombards (c. 1013).
- Leo of Ostia (Books 1–3) & Peter the Deacon (Book 4): The chronicle of the sacred monastery of Casino (Chronicon casinense) from 529 to the 12th century (including the medieval feudal state of Terra Sancti Benedicti), first extracted from the Monte Cassino manuscripts by Angelo Della Noce, abbot of Monte Casino. Includes appendices not published by Della Noce.

=== Volume 5 ===
Muratori, Lodovico Antonio, ed. (1724). Rerum italicarum scriptores (in Latin). Vol. 5. Milan: Societatis Palatinae.

- Dedication to Cardinal Benedetto Erba Odescalchi with portrait by Girolamo Ferroni.
- Four ancient chronicles (Chronologi antiqui quatuor), first published by Antonio Caracciolo in 1626, and here corrected by Camillo Pellegrino from the Monte Cassino manuscripts.
  - Erchempert: The History of the Lombards in Benevento (Historia Langobardorum Beneventanorum degentium) from Arechis II (758) until 888;
  - Lupus Protospatharius: Chronicon rerum in regno Neapolitano gestarum, a concise history of Langobardia Minor from 805 to 1102;
  - A monk of Monte Cassino: Rerum in regno Neapolitano gestarum, breve chronicon from 1000 to 1212;
  - Falco of Benevento: Chronicon Beneventanum, the story of Benevento between 1102 and 1139 including the rise of the Norman Roger II of Sicily from 1127.
- Anon.: Chronicon Anonymi Casinensis, a chronicle from the Monte Cassino archives.
- Anon: Chronicon ignoti civis Barensis focussing on Bari and Apulia from 855 to 1118. It covers the First Crusade and Byzantine affairs when Bari was a Greek capital. It was transcribed from a Salerno manuscript by Camillo Pellegrino.
- History of the Lombard princes (Historiae principum Langobardorum) Book 2, which describes the ancient duchy of Benevento and the succession of the abbots of Monte Cassino from Petronax of Brescia, in 720 to Rainald I in 1137. It includes essays by Camillo Pellegrino on the Collimento family, the meaning of the name Porta, and the ancient location of the city of Capua.
- William of Apulia: The Deeds of Robert Guiscard (Gesta Roberti Wiscardi), a contemporary poem describing the Norman conquest of southern Italy. Includes a commentary by Gottfried Wilhelm von Leibniz and Jean Tiremois.
- Anon.: Short chronicle of the Normans (Breve chronicon Northmannicum) from 1041 to 1085, from a manuscript held by Pietro Polidori. [Now considered to be a forgery.]
- Ralph of Caen: The deeds of prince Tancred during the Jerusalem expedition (Gesta Tancredi principis in expeditione Hierosolymitana), a narrative of the First Crusade, edited by the French historians Edmund Martène and Ursin Durand.
- Donizo of Canossa: Life of countess Matilda (Vita Mathildis Comitissae) in verse, together with the charter in which she endowed the Church with the Terre Matildiche.
- Anon. Life of countess Matilda (Vita Comitissae Mathildis), a transcript of an oration edited by Leibniz from a manuscript in the collection of Francesco Maria Florentini. (Note: Francesco Maria Fiorentini (1603–1673) was a doctor in Lucca known for his sanitary advice to the city which helped combat the 1630 plague. His Memorie della gran contessa Matilde was an early modern contribution to medieval history.)
- Anon. of Novocomensis: Cumanus, a poem about Milan's war and destruction of Como from 1118 To 1127, from Milanese and Como manuscripts.
- Landulf Junior, History Of Milan (Historia Mediolanensis) from 1095 to 1137, from a manuscript in Library of the Metropolitan Chapter of Milan edited by Giuseppe Antonio Sassi.
- Moses of Bergamo: Poem in praise of Bergamo (Carmen de Laudibus Bergomi) from 1120, a patriotic description of a medieval commune, originally published by Mario Mucio.
- Gaufredo Malaterra: History of Sicily (Historia Sicula), dating to about 1098 and covering the brothers Robert Guiscard and Roger I conquest of Sicily, edited by Giovanni Battista Caruso.
- Alexander of Telese, The Deeds of Roger of Sicily (Gesta Rogeri), and Address to King Roger (Alloquium ad regem Rogerium).

=== Volume 6 ===
Muratori, Lodovico Antonio, ed. (1725). Rerum italicarum scriptores (in Latin). Vol. 6. Milan: Societatis Palatinae.

- Dedication to Cardinal Gilberto Borromeo, bishop of Novara, with portrait by Girolamo Ferroni.
- Peter the Deacon: Essay on the famous Cassino (De viris illustribus Casinensibus opusculu) from the Barberini library (now in the Vatican Library), first published by Giovanni Battista Mari from a manuscript in the Biblioteca Barberina (now part of the Vatican Library).
- Relatio translationis S. Giminiani, a contemporary account of the translation of the remains of St Geminianus to Modena in 1106, from a manuscript in the Biblioteca Estense.
- Ferdinando Ughelli: A diverse chronicle Of Pisa (Chronica varia Pisana) from a manuscript in Lucca.
- Anon.: Lives of four former abbots of La Trinità della Cava (Vitae quatuor priorum abbatum Cavensium), Alferius (1011–1050), Leo (1050–1079), Peter (1079–1122), and Constabilis (1122–1124).
- Caffaro di Rustico da Caschifellone et al.: (Note: The other authors include: Jacopo Auria marquess of Cassino, Bartolomeo the Scribe, Bartolomeo Bonifacio, Enrico Drogo, Enrico marquess of Gavio, Nicola Guercio, Marchisio the Scribe, Guglielmo de Multedo, chancellor Oberto, Ogerio, Ottobono the Scribe, Lanfranco Pignoli, Oberto Stanconi, Bonivassallo and Marino Usodimare,) Genoese Chronicles (Annales ienuenses) from 1099 until 1294, the earliest civic chronicle composed by a layman.
- Étienne Baluze (ed.): A brief history of the liberation of Messina from the Saracen yoke (Brevis historia liberationis Messanae a Sarracenorum jugo) by Roger I in 1060.
- Otto of Freising, completed by Rahewdin: The deeds of emperor Frederick (Gesta Friderici imperatoris) checked against the manuscripts in the Imperial Library.
- Otto of St. Blasien: Chronicle (Chronicon), continuation of the chronicles of Frederick by Otto Freising, et al. up to 1209 from manuscripts in the Imperial Library.
- Burchard of Strasburg: (Note: Burkardus, native of Cologne, a notarius in the entourage of Frederick I. Several of his letters survive, one of which relates the author's diplomatic embassies to Aquileia, Salzburg and Hungary in 1161. In 1175, Burchard was sent on a diplomatic mission to Saladin.) Letter to abbot Nikolas von Segeberg on the emperor Fredrick's destruction Of Milan (Epistola Burchardi) in 1162.
- Boncompagno da Signa: Book of the siege of Ancona (Liber de obsidione Anconae) by Frederick I in 1173 and the liberation of the city, extracted by Filippo Argelati from a privately owned manuscript now in Cleveland, Ohio.
- Ottone & Acerbo Morena, & Anon.: History of Lodi (Historia rerum Laudensium) from manuscripts in the Biblioteca Ambrosiana and a manuscript found by Felice Osio, edited by Giuseppe Antonio Sassi.
- Sire Raul, also known as Ralph of Milan: a contemporary account of The deeds of Frederick I in Italy (De rebus gestis Friderici primi in Italia) from a manuscript in the Biblioteca di Brera.

=== Volume 7 ===
Muratori, Lodovico Antonio, ed. (1725). Rerum italicarum scriptores (in Latin). Vol. 7. Milan: Societatis Palatinae.

- Dedication to Rinaldo d’ Este, Duke of Modena and Reggio, with portrait by Antonio Consetti.
- Romualdo Guarna; Chronicle (Chronicon sive Annales), from a manuscript in Biblioteca Ambrosiana with commentary by Giuseppe Antonio Sassi.
- Hugo Falcandus On events in the Kingdom of Sicily (De rebus gestis in Siciliae regno), from the library of Giovanni Battista Caruso.
- Godfrey of Viterbo: Pantheon, spanning the creation through to the reigns of Conrad III, Frederic Barbarossa and Henry VI in the time of pope Urban III.
- Sicard of Cremona: Chronicle from the Birth of Christ to the year 1213 (Chronica Universalis), from a manuscript in the Imperial Library and also the Biblioteca Estense.
- Anon.: Brief chronicle of Cremona (Chronicon breve Cremonense) from 1096 to 1232 from a Cremona manuscript.
- Bernard the Treasurer [of Corbie Abbey]: On the acquisition of the Holy Land (Chronique d'Ernoul et de Bernard le trésorier) from 1095 to about 1230, originally in Old French, reproduced here from a Latin manuscript in the Biblioteca Estense.
- Anon.: Chronicle of Fossanova (Chronicon Fossae Nova) from the 'year of our salvation' until 1217, edited by Ferdinando Ughelli.
- Anon.: Brief chronicle of the church of Atina (Chronicon breve Atinensis ecclesiae), from manuscripts in Fossanova Abbey.
- Anon.: Chronicle of Cava (Chronicon Cavense) from 569 to 1318. [Now considered one of the most audacious forgeries of the eighteenth century.]
- Excerpts from the martyrology and obituaries of Montecassino (Excerpta ex martyrologio et necrologio Casinensi), from the Abbey.
- Richard of San Germano: Chronicle of events from the death of William II of Sicily in 1189 to 1243 (Chronica regni Siciliae), extracted from the Cassino library manuscript by Ferdinando Ughelli.
- Matthew Spinelli: (Note: Matteo Spinelli da Giovinazzo, an alleged vernacular chronicler of the 13th century, rich in information on the historical events of the kingdom of Naples.) Neapolitan diary (Ephemerides Neapolitanae) covering the Kingdom of Naples from 1247 to 1268, with clarifying notes by Daniel Papebroch. [Also shown to be a forgery.]

=== Volume 8 ===
Muratori, Lodovico Antonio, ed. (1726). Rerum italicarum scriptores (in Latin). Vol. 8. Milan: Societatis Palatinae.

- Dedication to Wirich Philipp von Daun, Governor of Milan, with portrait by Girolamo Ferroni.
- Gerardo Maurisio: (Note: Gerardo Maurisio, (1176–1237) was a medieval Italian historian based in Vicenza) History of the deeds of Ezzelino III da Romano (Historia de rebus gestis Eccelini de Romano) from 1183 to about 1237, a manuscript unearthed by Felice Osio here with a preface by Leibniz.
- Antonio Godi: (Note: Antonio Godi (d. 1438) was an Italian notary from a noble Vicenza family.) Chronicle (Chronica) from 1194 to 1260, similar to the Historia of Gerardo Maurisio and the first of three manuscripts found by Felice Osio in Vicenza. This version was corrected against a second copy in the Biblioteca Ambrosiana.
- Niccolò Smereglo: (Note: Niccolò Smereglo (c. 1240 – c. 1312) was a lawyer and leading citizen of Vicenza. Smereglo was a nickname that was derived from merlin (Italian: smeriglio), a falcon used for lark hunting. He is credited with Annales civitatis Vicentiae by tradition.) Chronicle (Chronicon) related to records by Gerardo Maurisio and Antonio Godi, from 1200 to 1279, with an anonymous supplement from 1279 to 1312. Felice Osio rescued, edited and published the manuscripts, and these were checked against the Biblioteca Ambrosiana copies.
- Anon.: Life of Count Ricciardo of San Bonifacio (Ricciardi comitis sancti Bonifacii) & the deeds of Ezzelino III da Romano, (Note: The Sambonifacio (or San Bonifacio) were a noble family of Verona. With the rise of Ezzelino da Romano they were forced leave Verona (1225) to move to Padua.) a work of uncertain authority edited by Felice Osio.
- Lorenzo de Monacis, on Ezzelino III from De gestis, moribus et nobilitate civitatis Venetiarum Book VIII, edited with commentary by Felice Osio.
- Rolandino of Padua: Chronicles of the Trevisan March (De factis in Marchia Tarvisina), Book XII, from about 1180 to 1260, first published by Felice Osio, but here corrected against manuscripts in the Biblioteca Ambrosiana and Estense libraries.
- Anon.: Little chronicle of Ferrara (Chronica parva Ferrariensis) from the origin of Ferrara to about 1264 from a manuscript in the Estese library.
- Niccolò di Jamsilla: (Note: The Jamsilla Chronicle from the medieval owner of the manuscript, a codex kept in Naples. Jamsilla is a corruption of Joinville, an Angevin family that flourished in Italy after 1270. It is clear the chronicler was somebody close to Manfred.) History of the deeds of Frederick II and his sons Conrad, and Manfredi (Historia de rebus gestis Friderici II) from 1200 to 1268, originally issued by Fernando Ughelli, now corrected.
- Parisio da Cereta: (Note: Parisio da Cerea (fl. 1233–1277) was a notary in Cerea with contacts to local authorities in Verona.) Chronicle of Verona (Chronicon Veronense) from 1117 to 1278, extended by others to 1375, from the Biblioteca Estense.
- Monks of Padua: Chronicle on events chiefly in Lombardy, and the Trevisan March from 1207 to 1270, from Felice Ohio's edition corrected against an Biblioteca Ambrosiana manuscript.
- Anon. of the Vatican: History of Sicily from the arrival of the Normans in Puglia until 1282 (Historia Sicula), first published by Giovanni Battista Carusio.
- Saba Malaspina, Events in Sicily from 1250 to 1276 (Rerum Sicularum libri VI) first published by Étienne Baluze in Miscellaneorum, Vol. 6.
- Ricordano Malespini: (Note: Ricordano Malispini belonged to a noble Guelph family banished from Florence after the battle of Montaperti in 1260. His grandson Giacotto extended the narrative until 1286.) History of Florence (Historia Florentina) to 1281, extended by Giacotto Malespini to 1286.
- Provincial synod held in Milan in 1287 under Archbishop Otto and the Constitutiones of Goffredo da Castiglione, from an Biblioteca Ambrosianamanuscript.
- Anon. of Reggio: Record of Reggio Emilia (Memoriale potestatum Regiensium Gestorum) from 1154 to 1290, from a manuscript in the Biblioteca Estense.

=== Volume 9 ===
Muratori, Lodovico Antonio, ed. (1726). Rerum italicarum scriptores (in Latin). Vol. 9. Milan: Societatis Palatinae.

- Dedication to Antonio Farnese, Duke of Parma, with portrait by Giovanni Caselli.
- Jacobus de Voragine, archbishop of Genoa, Chronicle of Genoa (Chronicon Genuense) from the origin of the city to the year 1297, from manuscripts in the Biblioteca Ambrosiana and Estense libraries.
- Stephanardus de Vicomercato: Poem on the deeds of the city of Milan under archbishop Ottone Visconti (Poema de gestis in civitate Mediolani sub Othone Vicecomite archiepiscopo), previously published in Muratori's Anecdotes.
- Riccobaldo of Ferrara: Bounds of the church in Ravenna (Pomarium Ravennatis ecclesiae), or universal history from approximately 700 to 1297, first published by Johann Georg von Eccard, but now revised. Riccobaldo, or a contemporary anon. writer: An historical compilation (Compilatio historica) from the beginning of the world to the year 1313, published by Eccard. Johannes Philippus de Lignamine: Continuation of the chronicle of Riccobaldo (Continuatio chronici Ricobaldini) to the year 1374.
- Riccobaldo of Ferrara, Italian translation by Matteo Maria Bojardo: Chronicle of Roman emperors (Chronicon Romanorum imperatorum) from Charlemagne to Otto IV, from a manuscript in the Biblioteca Classense.
- Anon. (contemporary): History of the Dulcinian heretics of Novara (Historia Dulcini haeresiarchae novariensis) from 1304 to 1307, together with An addition to the history (Additamentum ad historiam fratris Dulcini haeretici), from manuscripts in the Biblioteca Ambrosiana, with commentary by Giuseppe Antonio Sassi.
- Dino Compagni: Florentine chronicle (Chronicon florentinum) written in Italian from 1280 to 1312. extracted from a manuscript by Apostolo Zeno.
- Provincial synod of Pergamo (Synodus provincialis Pergami habita) called by Cassone della Torre, Archbishop Of Milan in 1311, from a manuscript in the Biblioteca Ambrosiana.
- Francesco Pipino of Bologna: Chronicle from 1176 to approximately 1314, from a manuscript in the Estense.
- Anon. (Contemporary): Chronicle of Parma (Chronicon Parmense) from 1308 to 1309, from a manuscript in the Estense.
- Nicholas, Bishop of Butrint (Albania): Report on the Italian journey of Emperor Henry VII (Relatio de itinere Italico Henrici VII imper.) from 1300 to 1313 to Clement V, previously published by Étienne Baluze.
- Ferreto de' Ferreti: History of events in Italy (Historia rerum in Italia gestarum) from 1250 to 1318. from a Vicenza manuscript; On the death of Benvenuto Campesani (De morte Benvenuti Campesani poetae vicentini), addressed to Albertino Mussato of Padua; Speech at the wedding of Daniel Ferretti.
- Ferreto de' Ferreti: Origin of the Scaligers (De Scaligerorum origine) a poem written about 1329 for Cangrande della Scala, lord of Verona, Vicenza, and Padua, from a Veronese manuscript.
- Giovanni da Cermenate: History of the site, origin and worship of the city of Ambrose (Historia de situ, origine, et cultoribus Ambrosianae urbis) and the achievements of Milan under the rule of Emperor Henry VI from 1307 to 1313, plus variant readings and supplements.

=== Volume 10 ===
Muratori, Lodovico Antonio, ed. (1727). Rerum italicarum scriptores (in Latin). Vol. 10. Milan: Societatis Palatinae.

- Dedication to Leopold, Duke of Lorraine, with portrait by Girolamo Ferroni.
- Anon. [Giovanni Gaspare Beretti]: Topographical Dissertation (Dissertatio chorographica) on medieval Italy to be read with a map of Greco-Lombardo-Frankish Italy, as it was transferred from the Greeks and Lombards to Charlemagne, with foldout map. (Note: See introduction, above.)
- Albertino Mussato: Three works from Historia augusta Henrici VII caesaris & alia quae extant opera, published by Felice Osio in Venice in 1636 and edited by Osio, Lorenzo Pignoria and Nicola Villani, updated with corrections:
  - The Augustan History of Emperor Henry VII (De gestis Heinrici VII caesaris Historia Augusta), an account of Henry VII's expedition to Italy from 1310 to 1313;
  - On the deeds of the Italians after Emperor Henry VII (De gestis Italicorum post mortem Henrici VII) covering August 1313 to at least July 1321;
  - Eccerinis, considered the first "modern" tragedy modelled on the tragedies of Seneca.
- Anon.: Chronicle of Sicily (Chronicon Siciliae), from approximately 820 to 1328, reprinted from Thesauro anecdotorum by Edmond Marténe and Ursin Durand.
- Niccolò Speciale: History of Sicily (Historia Sicula) from 1282 to 1337, previously published in Marcae Hispanicae edited by Étienne Baluze.

=== Volume 11 ===
Muratori, Lodovico Antonio, ed. (1727). Rerum italicarum scriptores (in Latin). Vol. 11. Milan: Societatis Palatinae.

- Dedication to the sponsor, the Senate of the republic of Lucca with an engraving by Francesco Zucchi.
- Opicinus de Canistris: Description of splendid Pavia (Commentarius De laudibus Papiae), dating from about 1300 from a manuscript in Pavia (Ticinum).
- Anon.: Ancient Chronicle of Modena (Annales veteres Mutinensium) from 1131 to 1336 from a manuscript in the Biblioteca Estense.
- Bonifacio de Morano: Chronicle of Modena (Chronicon Mutinense) from 1306 to 1342, from the Biblioteca Estense.
- Ogerio Alfieri & Guglielmo Ventura: Chronicle of Asti (Chronica Astensia) from the origin of the city or 1070 to about 1325, then from 1319 to 1367 by Secondino Ventura, from a Malaspina manuscript. (Note: The Chronicle of Ogerio Alfieri (c. 1230 – c. 1294) consists of 44 short fragments ranging from the origin of the city of Asti until 1294.)
- Fr. Raniero Granchi of Pisa: On the battles of Tuscany (De proeliis Tusciae), an epic poem on Pisa's wars from the battle of Montecatini (1315) up to Pisa’s conquest of Lucca in 1342 from a manuscript in the Biblioteca Classense. (Note: A patriotic-historical epic poem on Pisa's wars in the period 1315–42. Written in eight short books of quantitative Latin hexameters. Muratori called the poemcaliginosum (murky), but his text was based on a faulty transcription of the manuscript.)
- Anon. (contemporary): The annals of Pisa (Annales Pistorienses) or Commentaries on activities in Tuscany from 1300 to 1348, written in Italian.
- Galvano Fiamma: Collection of articles (Manipulus florum) or History of Milan from the origin of the city to about 1371, from a Milan manuscript.
- Tolomeo da Lucca: History of the Church from the birth of Christ (Historia ecclesiastica a nativitate Christi) until about 1312, from manuscripts in the Ambrosain and Padua.
- Tolomeo da Lucca: Brief Annals (Breves Annales) from 1061 to 1303.
- Niccolò Tegrimi (c. 1448 – 1527) Lucasian lawyer: The life of Castruccio Castracani degli Anteminelli, Duke Of Lucca (Vita Castruccii Antelminelli) from 1301 to 1328.

=== Volume 12 ===
Muratori, Lodovico Antonio, ed. (1728). Rerum italicarum scriptores (in Latin). Vol. 12. Milan: Societatis Palatinae.

- Dedication to the sponsor, the Republic of Venice, illustrated by Tiepolo and engraved by Francesco Zucchi and showing the allegorical figures of Justice (with a sword and weight scale) and Peace (with a laurel branch) paying homage to the lion of St. Mark. (Note: Tiepolo attribution by the Frick Collection)
- Andrea Dandolo: Venetian Chronicle (Chronicon Venetum) from the time of St Mark to 1339, extended by Rafaino Caresini to 1388, from manuscripts in the Este and Ambrosian Libraries.
- Lodovico Bonconte Monaldeschi: Fragments of the chronicle of Rome written In Italian (Fragmenta annalium Romanorum) from 1328 to 1340, from manuscripts in the Imperial Library of Vienna.
- Domenico da Gravina: Chronicle of events in Apulia from 1333 to 1350, from manuscripts in the Imperial Library of Vienna.
- Fr. Giovanni Cornazzani: Fragments of the history Parma (Historiae Parmensis fragmenta) from 1301 to 1355, translated into Italian with additions until 1379, from a Torelli manuscript.
- Guglielmo Cortusi: History of the novelties of Padua and Lombardy (Chronica de novitatibus Padue et Lombardie) from 1256 To 1364, from the version by of Felice Osio corrected from four other sources (Domenico Molin, Francesco and Marco Antonio Mussati, Bartolomeo Petardi, and Giacomo Filippo Thomassini).
- Anon.: Two additions to Cortusi's chronicle (Additamenta duo ad Chronicon Cortusiorum) one from 1359 to about 1365 and the other from 1354 to 1391, in the Padua dialect from a manuscript in the Biblioteca Estense.
- Galvano Fiamma: Essay on the deeds of Azzone, Luchino and Giovanni Visconti (Opusculum de rebus gestis ab Azone, Luchino et Johanne Vicecomitibus) from 1328 To 1342, from a manuscript in the Biblioteca Ambrosiana, with notes by Giuseppe Antonio Sassi.
- Bonincontro Morigia: Chronicle of Monza from its foundation to 1349, referring mainly to the deeds of former Visconti leaders, from a manuscript in the Biblioteca Ambrosiana.

=== Volume 13 ===
Muratori, Lodovico Antonio, ed. (1728). Rerum italicarum scriptores (in Latin). Vol. 13. Milan: Societatis Palatinae.

- Dedication to Cardinal Agostino Cusani, with a portrait engraved by Francesco Zucchi.
- Giovanni Villani: Universal history from the foundation of Florence (Historia universalis a condita Florentia) to 1348, written in Italian in a new edition from a manuscript in the collection of Venetian patrician Giovanni Battista Recanati.
- Bartholomew of Neocastro: History of Sicily (Historia Sicula) from the death of Fredrick II in 1250 to 1294, from a Messina manuscript.
- Matteo Palmieri: On the life and deeds of Niccolò Acciaiuoli (De vita et rebus gestis Nicolai Acciaioli) from 1310 to 1366, in Latin from the Nardò manuscripts.
- Conforto da Costozza: Fragments of the history of Vicenza (Fragmenta historiae vicentinae) from 1371 to 1387, from a Venetian manuscript.

=== Volume 14 ===
Muratori, Lodovico Antonio, ed. (1729). Rerum italicarum scriptores (in Latin). Vol. 14. Milan: Societatis Palatinae.

- Dedication to Cardinal Juan Álvaro Cienfuegos Villazón, with a portrait engraved by Francesco Zucchi.
- Matteo Villani & Filippo Villani, History (Historia) from 1348 to 1364, updated against two manuscripts.
- Jacobus Malvecius: Chronicle of Brescia (Chronicon Brixianum) from the origin of the city to the year 1332, from a manuscript in the collection of Giovanni Giacomo de Tassis of Bergamo.
- Antonio Astesano: Poem on variety of fortunes (Carmen de varietate fortunae) or on the life and deeds of the city of Asti from its foundation to 1342, from a Malaspina manuscript.
- Anon.: Annals of Cesena (Annales Caesenates) from 1162 to 1362, from a manuscript Brandolini of Forlì manuscript.

=== Volume 15 ===
Muratori, Lodovico Antonio, ed. (1729). Rerum italicarum scriptores (in Latin). Vol. 15. Milan: Societatis Palatinae.

- Dedication to Cardinal Cornelio Bentivoglio, with a portrait engraved by Francesco Zucchi.
- Andrea Dei & Angelo Tura: Chronicle of Siena (Chronicon Senense) in Italian from 1186 to 1352 from a manuscript in Siena, published by Uberto Benvoglienti. [Subsequently shown to be an anonymous 17th century text.] (Note: Philological analysis carried out by Alessando Lissini for RIS2 Vol. 15 Part 6 (see below) revealed that it is a 17th century text. Benvoglienti relied on the attribution to Andrea Dei by the antiquarian Celso Cittadini, and Muratori trusted his judgement.)
- Nerio Donati the younger: Annals of Siena (Annales Senenses) from 1352 to 1381, from a Siena manuscript with notes by Uberto Benvoglienti.
- Anon. (contemporary): The Este chronicle (Chronicon Estense) comprising the deeds of the Margraves of Este from 1200 to 1354 and continued by other authors until 1393, from a manuscript in the Biblioteca Estense.
- Giovanni da Bazzano: Chronicle of Modena (Chronicon Mutinense) from 1363 To 1363 from a Modena manuscript.
- Anon. (contemporary): Orvieto journal (Ephemerides Urbevetanae) from 1342 to 1363 written in Italian from a manuscript in the Vatican Library.
- Daniele di Chinasso: (Note: Daniele di Chinasso, a good and apparently accurate writer, of whom nothing is known except that he was a native of Treviso and was living at Venice during the war of Chioggia.) The war of Chioggia (Belli apud fossam Clodiam) and elsewhere between Venice and Genoa from 1378, in Italian from a manuscript in the Biblioteca Estense.
- Bartolomeo Gorelli, an Arrezo notary: Deeds of the city of Arrezo (De rebus gestis in civitate Aretina) from 1300 to 1384, a poem written in Italian from a Siena manuscript.
- Anon.: Chronicle of Rimini (Chronicon Ariminense) from c. 1188 to 1385 and continued until 1352, from a Rimini manuscript.
- Anon.: Records of Pisa from 1089 to 1389 and continued 1406 from a manuscript in the Laurentian Library.

=== Volume 16 ===
Muratori, Lodovico Antonio, ed. (1730). Rerum italicarum scriptores (in Latin). Vol. 16. Milan: Societatis Palatinae.

- Dedication to the City of Milan Prefect and Council of 60 Decurioni, with an engraving by Girolamo Ferroni.
- Anon.: Lives of the bishops and patriarchs of Aquileia (Vitae episcoporum et patriarcharum Aquileiensium) from the first century to 1358, from the Biblioteca Ambrosiana, cols. 1–18; and
  - Antonio Belloni: Lives of the Aquileia patriarchs (Vitae patriarcharum aquileiensium), a fuller version of the same, extending to 1422, from the Vatican Library, cols. 21–106.
- Pier Paolo Vergerio the Elder: Lives of the da Carrara princes from about 1355, from a manuscript in the Biblioteca Estense compared against two others in the Biblioteca Ambrosiana, pp. 109–184.
- Pier Paolo Vergerio the Elder: Various historical speeches and letters, from a manuscript in the Biblioteca Estense, pp. 185–248.
  - Subjects: da Carrara family; Francesco Novello da Carrara; Francesco I da Carrara; Ubertino da Carrara; Giovanni Garzoni; Saint Jerome; Carlo Malatesta; Petrarch; Coluccio Salutati; Giorgio Stella; Giovanni Stella; Giacomo Filippo Thomassini; Francesco Zabarella; Carlo Zeno.
- Anon. (contemporary): A summary of Italian history from Frederick II (Breviarium Italicae historiae a temporibus Friderici II augusti) to 1354, from a manuscript in the Pauline Library Leipzig, cols. 249–288.
- Pietro Azario: Deeds of the Visconti princes (Chronicon de gestis principum Vicecomitum) from 1250 to 1362, and The Canavese war (De bello canapiciano), 1339, from a manuscript in the Biblioteca Ambrosiana. cols. 291–424
  - A note on the Canavese war (De bello canapiciano). cols. 291–424; 425–440
- Giovanni di Musso (Note: For Giovanni di Musso (14th– early 15th century), see Dizionario Biografico degli Italiani - Volume 77 (2012), at Treccani; his Chronicon Placentinum or Historia de nobilibus mundi covers the history of Piacenza and Lombardy and is copied in parts from the chronicle of Pietro da Ripalta.): The Piacenza chronicle (Chronicon Placentinum) from 222 to 1402, from a manuscript in the Biblioteca Estense. cols. 441-634..
- Anon.: The Milanese Chronicle (Annales Mediolanenses) from 1230 to 1402, from a Novara manuscript. cols. 635–840.
- Castello Castelli: Bergamo Guelph-Ghibellin Chronicle (Chronicon Bergomense Guelpho-Ghibellinum) from 1378 to 1407, from a Bergamo manuscript. cols. 841–1020.
- Peter of Castelletto: Funeral order and oration for Gian Galeazzo Visconti (Ordo funeris Johannis Galeatii Vicecomitis) Duke of Milan in 1402, from a manuscript belonging to Francesco Arisi of Cremona, cols. 1021–1054.
- Sozomeno da Pistoia: (Note: Zomino di ser Bonifazio (1387–1458), who preferred the Hellenized name Sozomeno, was a notable figure in fifteenth-century humanism. He studied Greek under Guarino da Verona in Florence, attended the Council of Constance, where he profited from the exciting discoveries of ancient manuscripts by Poggio Bracciolini and others, taught Latin poetry and rhetoric in Pistoia and Florence, wrote commentaries on several Roman poets, and starteda mammoth historical work, Chronicon universale. Above all, however, he collected and annotated ancient texts in both Latin and Greek, amassing well over a hundred volumes, which he left to serve as a public library.) Model history (Specimen historiae) from 1362 to 1410, from a manuscript in the collection of Giovanni Battista Resta, cols. 1057-1204.

=== Volume 17 ===
Muratori, Lodovico Antonio, ed. (1730). Rerum italicarum scriptores (in Latin and Italian). Vol. 17. Milan: Societatis Palatinae.

- Dedication to the Republic of Genoa with engraving by Francesco Zucchi.
- Galeazzo and Andrea Gatari: (Note: Galeazzo Gatari (c. 1344 – 1405) was an apothecary and leading citizen in Padua and active on behalf of the Carraresi dynasty. His Chronicon, written in the vernacular, was edited by his son Bartolomeo and completed by his eldest son, Andrea (c. 1370 – 1454)) Two versions of the Chronicle of Padua (Chronicon Patavinum), written in Italian, from 1311 to 1406, compared side by side, from manuscripts in the Biblioteca Estense. Attachment by Galeazzo Gatari.
- Giorgio Stella: (Note: Giorgio Stella (c. 1365 – 1420), was a Genoa notary who extended the Chronicon januense of Jacobus de Voragine, and the earlier Annales Ianuenses of Caffaro to create a semi-official chronicle of the city.) Genoa Chronicle (Annales Genuenses) from 1298 to 1409, extended to 1435 by Giovanni Stella, his brother, from manuscripts in Verona, the Biblioteca Ambrosiana and Genoa. cols. 945–1318
- Anon.: The little Ripalta chronicle (Note: The abbey of St. Peter St Andrew of Ripalta (Rivalta) was an abbey situated close to Turin.) (Chronicon parvum Ripaltae) from 1195 to 1405, from a Malaspina manuscript, cols. 1319–1326.

=== Volume 18 ===
Muratori, Lodovico Antonio, ed. (1731). Rerum italicarum scriptores (in Latin and Italian). Vol. 18. Milan: Societatis Palatinae.

- Dedication to cardinal Prospero Lambertini, with a portrait by Francesco Zucchi.
- Pietro Gazata: (Note: Pietro Gazata (1335–1414) abbot of San Prospero, Reggio Emilia. In 1362 he accompanied Guillaume de Grimoard to Avignon on his election as pope Urban V and was appointed abbot the following year. His chronicle is based heavily on the Gesta Lombardiæ of his uncle, Sagacino Levalossi, a largely eyewitness account of contemporary affairs over the years 1303–35.) Reggio Emilia chronicle (Chronicon regiense) from 1372 to 1388, from an Biblioteca Estense manuscript. cols. 1-98.
- Matteo Griffoni: (Note: Matthaeus de Griffonibus (1351–1426), a notary from a leading Bologna family, had an important chancery post and in 1385 he became a member of the Consiglio dei Quattrocento. He was podestà of Imola in 1397 but exiled 1403–1405, then appointed official archivist to Bologna on his return.) Historical records of Bologna (Memoriale historicum rerum Bononiensium) from 1109 to 1428, from a Bologna manuscript. cols. 101–234.
- Bartolomeo della Pugliola: (Note: Bartolomeo della Pugliola (c. 1358 – c. 1424) from the friary of San Francesco in Bologna, had studied at the Studium generale in Florence. His Le Antichità di Bologna relies heavily on the lost chronicle of his contemporary Jacopo Bianchetti, the chronicles of Pietro and Floriano Villola and the Memoriale of Matteo Griffoni.) Miscellaneous history of Bologna (Historia miscella bononiensis) from 1104 to 1394, extended to 1471 by other contemporaries, in Italian from manuscripts in the Biblioteca Estense. cols. 237–792.
- Giovanni Sercambi: Chronicle of Lucca (Chronicon de rebus gestis Lucensium/Croniche del secondo libro di Lucca) from 1400 to 1408, (Note: Sercambi's Le chroniche di parte e de' facti di Lucha commenced with Lucca's emancipation from Pisa by Charles IV in 1369 and ended with his death from the plague in 1424.) in Italian from a manuscript in the Biblioteca Ambrosiana. cols. 793–898.
- Giacomo Delayto, chancellor of Niccolò III d'Este, Marquis of Ferrara: Este chronicle (Annales Estenses) from 1393 to 1409, from a manuscript in the Este library, cols. 903–1096.
- Gino Capponi: (Note: The Capponi were an established Florentine family. Gino de Neri Capponi (1350–1421), a merchant and writer, was a prominent supporter of Rinaldo degli Albizzi and played a key role in the Florentine conquest of Pisa in 1406, but his banker son Neri Capponi (1388–1457) supported Cosimo de' Medici, helping him to return from exile in 1434 and becoming a leading figure in the Medici regime, second only to Cosimo.) Historical records of Florence (Monumenta historica de rebus Florentinorum) from 1378 to 1419, continued by his son Neri until 1456, in Italian from Florentine manuscripts with a portraits of Gino Capponi and his son by Girolamo Rossi. cols. 1097–1220.

=== Volume 19 ===
Muratori, Lodovico Antonio, ed. (1731). Rerum italicarum scriptores (in Latin and Italian). Vol. 19. Milan: Societatis Palatinae.

- Dedication to Giuseppe Maria Gonzaga with portrait engraved by Francesco Zucchi.
- Andrea Biglia: History of Milan (Rerum mediolanensium historia) from 1402 to 1431, from manuscripts in the Biblioteca Ambrosiana, Novara and belonging to Carlo Pertusati, cols. 1–158.
- Matteo Palmieri: Capture of Pisa (De captivitate pisarum), or of the war against Pisa conducted by Florance in 1406, from a Florentine manuscript. cols. 161–194.
- Giacomo Zeno: Life of Carlo Zeno (Vita Caroli Zeni) from about 1334 to 1418 his nephew, from a manuscript in the Padua Seminary. cols. 197–380.
- Anon.: Siena chronicle (Annales Senenses) from 1385 to 1422 from a Siena manuscript, cols. 383–428.
- Giovanni Antonio Campani: Life of Braccio da Montone (Brachii Perusini vita) from 1368 to 1424, previously printed in Basel, 1545, cols. 431–622.
- Lodrisio Crivelli: (Note: Lodrisio Crivelli (c.1412 – c.1471) graduated in law and served the Archbishops of Milan until 1443, learning Greek and studying the classics. He then taught in Bologna and other cities, including Milan. His poems and essays include statements which seem to support the Sforza seizure of Milan and by 1456 he was undertaking diplomatic assignments for the duke. He was also close to Enea Piccolomini who became Pius II. By 1463 he had fallen out with Sforza and taken refuge in Rome.) The life and deeds of Francisco Sforza (De vita rebusque gestis Sfortiae, bellicosissimi ducis) from approximately 1369 to 1424, from manuscripts in the French royal library (Bibliothecae Christianissimi Regis), cols. 623–732.
- Andrea De Redusis De Quero: (Note: Andreas de Reduciis de Quero (1365–1442) of the wealthy Redusio family from Quero in the Venito was educated at the University of Padua then worked as a notary in Treviso. He entered Venetian service as a soldier. From 1417 to 1442 he served as the chancellor of Treviso.) The Treviso chronicle (Chronicon Tarvisinum) from 1368 to 1428, from a Collalto family manuscript, cols. 735–866.
- Girolamo da Forli: (Note: Girolamo da Forlì (1348 – c. 1437) a native of Forlì, he studied theology in Venice and moved to Bologna in 1391 as magister theologiae, eventually supervising all the Dominican convents in the region.) The Forolivian chronicle (Chronicon foroliviense) from 1397 to 1433, from a Brandolini manuscript. cols. 869-908.
- Leonardo Bruni of Arezzo: Commentary on events of his time (Rerum suo tempore gestarum commentarius) from 1378 to 1340, previously published but now corrected against a Bergamo manuscript. cols. 909–942.
- Anon: History of Florence (Historia Florentina) from 1406 to1438, in Italian from an Biblioteca Estense manuscript. cols. 945–984.
- Giannozzo Manetti: Pistoia chronicle (Chronicon Pistoriense) from the founding of the city until 1446, from a Florentine manuscript. cols. 985–1076.

=== Volume 20 ===
Muratori, Lodovico Antonio, ed. (1731). Rerum italicarum scriptores (in Latin and Italian). Vol. 20. Milan: Societatis Palatinae.

- Dedication to Francesco Maria d'Este (later, Duke of Modena) with a portrait by Francesco Zucchi.
- Giovanni Bandino de Bartolomei: (Note: Giovanni Bandino de Bartolomei was a Sienese jurist who lectured in civil law and acted for the Sienese government. In 1389, he helped to form an alliance of Tuscan cities against the condottieri. He commenced his narration of local events in 1402. After 1422 it was continued intermittently by his great-grandson Francesco Tommasi until 1468, and by Pietro Rossi for the period 1429–1435. Francesco Piccolomini, when archbishop of Siena, drew these together to form Historia senensis.) History Of Siena (Historia Senensis) from 1202 to 1422, continued by his great-grandson Francesco Tomassi, and Pietro Russi until 1468, from a manuscript provided by Uberto Benvoglienti. (Note: Uberto Benvoglienti, a contemporary of Muratori and described as having a "brilliant intellect", headed the University of Siena and was responsible for discovering and transcribing many historical documents.) cols. 1–64.
- Porcellio Pandoni: (Note: Porcellio Pandone was born in Naples at the turn of the 15th century but educated in Rome supported by Otto Colonna (later Martin V). He was exiled in 1434 after the uprising against Pope Eugene IV and emerged in 1443 as "secretary and poet" to Alfonso of Aragon in Naples. In 1453 he was sent by Alfonso to Venice to write a Commentarii in the style of Livy on the war between Jacopo Piccinino and Francesco Sforza. He fell out with the Neapolitan court but returned briefly under Ferranti I before moving back to Rome working for Sixtus IV in 1473.) Commentaries of Count Jacopo Piccinino (Commentaria comitis Iacobi Picinini) in 1352, during the war between Venice and Milan, from a manuscript in Bergamo. cols. 65–154.
- Poggio Bracciolini: History of Florence (Historia Florentina) an updated edition of that published by Giovanni Battista Recanati with a portrait by Antonio Luciani. cols. 157–434.
- Giovanni da Ferrara: (Note: Giovanni Canali da Ferrara (1409–1462) Franciscan and professor of theology in Ferrara revised and continued 's chronicle which he dedicated to Borso d'Este, Duke of Ferrara in 1453.) Excerpts from the chronicles of the Este princes (Excerpta ex annalibus principum Estensium) from 1409 to 1454, from a manuscript in the Biblioteca Estense. cols. 437–474.
- Bartolomeo Platina: The life of Neri di Gino Capponi (Vita clarissimi viri Nerii Capponii), from a manuscript in the Strozzi library. cols. 475–516.
- Naldo Naldio: (Note: Naldo Naldi (1439–1513) was a Florentine poet and historian who for a period was very close to the Medici court.) Life of Giannozzo Manetti (Vita Jannotii Manetti) from 1396 to 1459, from a Manetti family manuscript. cols. 519–608.
- Bartolomeo Platina: History of the city of Mantua (Historia urbis Mantuae) from its origin to the year 1464, originally published by Peter Lambeck, now revised. cols. 609–862.
- Antonio de Ripalta: (Note: Antonio da Ripalta (d. 1463), from a leading Piacenza family, was involved in the city's defence against Francesco Sforza in 1447 and was captured and imprisoned. His son Alberto (1436–85) was also imprisoned but escaped; he studied in Pavia and became a jurist and orator.) The Piacenza chronicle (Annales Placentini) from 1401 to 1458 and continued by Alberto De Ripalta until 1484, from a Piacenza manuscript. cols. 865–978.
- Pietro Candido Decembrio: Life of Filippo Maria Visconti, third Duke of Milan (Vita Philippi Mariae Vicecomitis Mediolanensium) published in 1625, but checked and enlarged from a manuscript in the library of the monks of Saint Ambrose of Milan. cols. 981–1020.
- Pietro Candido Decembrio: Life of Francesco Sforza, fourth duke of Milan (Vita Francisci Sfortiae IV Mediolanensium ducis) from 1401 to 1462, from a manuscript in the French royal library (Bibliothecae Christianissimi regis). cols. 1021–1046.
- Pietro Candido Decembrio: Oration at the funeral of Nicolò Piccinino (Oratio Petri Candidi Decembrii in funere Nicolai Picinini) in 1444, translated into Italian by Polismagna, (Note: 'Polismagna was the pseudonym of a copyist and translator in the Ferrara court, sometimes confused with Carlo da San Giorgio.) from a manuscript in the Biblioteca Estense. cols. 1047–1090.

=== Volume 21 ===
Muratori, Lodovico Antonio, ed. (1732). Rerum italicarum scriptores (in Latin and Italian). Vol. 21. Milan: Societatis Palatinae.

- Dedication to André-Hercule de Fleury with a portrait by Francesco Zucchi.
- Lorenzo Bonincontri: Chronicle of San Miniato (Annales Laurentii Bonincontrii miniatensis) from 1360 to 1458, from a San Miniato manuscript. cols. 1–162.
- Giovanni Simonetta: (Note: Giovanni Simonetta joined the camp of Francesco Sforza in 1444 and rose to ducal secretary in the chancellery at the heart of the Sforza administration. In the 1470s he began writing his record of the career of Sforza (Commentarii de rebus gestis Francisci Sfortiae) but had to rely on other sources prior to his personal involvement.) History of the deeds Francesco I Sforza (Historiae de rebus gestis Francisci I Sfortiae) from 1421 to 1466, previously published, now corrected & enlarged, cols. 165–782.
- Cristoforo da Soldo: (Note: Cristoforo da Soldo (d. 1470) was active in the administration of Brescia from 1427 and, among other things, responsible for improving the defences of the city against the incursions of Milan.) Brescia chronicle (Annales Brixiani) from 1437 to 1468, in Italian, from a manuscript in the Biblioteca Estense. cols. 785–914.
- Guernerio da Gubbio: (Note: Guerriero Campioni (d. 1480) became a notary in 1429 but took part in various military campaigns in Tuscany before serving Guidantonio da Montefeltro duke of Urbino in military and diplomatic missions. He accompanied the young Federico da Montefeltro when combined forces with Niccolò Piccinino in Lombardy in 1438. In between campaigns, Guerriero was based in Gubbio as Frederico's chancellor. He was frequently involved in diplomatic missions to other cities, but by 1467 he was permanently in Gubbio.) Chronicle of Gubbio (Chronicon Eugubinum) from 1350 to 1372, in Italian, from a manuscript in the Vatican Library. cols. 917–1024.
- Anon.: Neapolitan diary (Diaria Neapolitana) from 1266 to 1478, from a manuscript in the collection of Francisco Valletta. cols. 1027–1138.
- Giovanni Garzoni: On the greatness of the city of Bologna (De dignitate urbis Bononiae commentarius), from a Bologna manuscript. cols. 1139–1168.
- Adamo di Montaldo: (Note: Adamo di Montaldo was born in Genoa but first recorded studying at the court of Alfonso in Naples in 1457 to be an Augustinian monk. He was back in Genoa by 1464, where eventually he was responsible for reforming the local monastery. This caused some upset among his superiors and by 1497 he was in Rome. He was pursued by some of his accused and briefly arrested, but was protected by Pope Innocent VIII. He was stabbed to death in 1494 after a sermon in which he criticised the controversial Pope Alexander VI.) In praise of the House of Doria (De laudibus familiae de Auria) c. 1380, from a Genoa manuscript. cols. 1171–1186.
- Pietro Cirneo: (Note: Pietro Cirneo (Pietro Felce or in Latin Petrus Cyrnæus) (1447–1506), was a priest and historian of Corsican origin. An orphan at a young age, he moved first to the island of Elba, working in the iron mines of Rio, and then to Tuscany. He chose the pseudonym of Petrus Cyrnæus, Italianized into Pietro Cirneo, from one of the Greek denominations of Corsica, Cyrnus. He studied Greek and Latin in Venice and working in the Venito, eventually retiring to a parish in Corsica.) Commentary on the war of Ferrara (Commentarius de bello Ferrariensi) from 1482 to 1484, from a manuscript in the Biblioteca Estense. cols. 1191–1218.

=== Volume 22 ===
Muratori, Lodovico Antonio, ed. (1733). Rerum italicarum scriptores (in Latin and Italian). Vol. 22. Milan: Societatis Palatinae.

- Dedication to Cardinal Annibale Albani, with a portrait by Francesco Zucchi
- Tristano Caracciolo: (Note: Tristano Caracciolo, (c. 1437 – 1522) was from an established but impoverished Neapolitan family and had little education until he was 35. His many historical biographies were influenced by his noble origin and personal experiences.) Historical essays (Opuscula historica), from a Caracciolo family manuscript:
  - Life of Joanna I of Naples. cols. 7–18;
  - Life of Giovanni (Sergianni) Caracciolo, Great Steward of Naples. cols. 19–38;
  - Life of Giovanni Battista Spinelli, (Note: Giovanni Battista Spinelli served the Spanish rulers of Naples from Ferrante I, through the Hapsburg succession of Philip I of Castile to the reign of Charles V, Holy Roman Emperor, amassing considerable wealth and influence. He married into the Caracciolo family.) Count of Cariati. cols. 39–66;
  - On the variety of fortune (De varietate fortunae). cols. 67–96;
  - On the Inquisition (De inquisitione), a letter. cols. 97–106;
  - Genealogy of Charles I (Genealogia Caroli primi regis Neapolis). cols. 107–112
  - On Ferdinand I (De Ferdinando). cols. 113–120;
  - Defence of Neapolitan nobility (Nobilitatis Neapolitanae defensio). cols. 121–128.
- Anon.: Annals of Forlì (Annales Forolivienses) from 1275 to 1473, from a Brandolini manuscript. cols. 131–240.
- Anon.: Parma diary (Diarium Parmense) from 1477 to 1482, from a Caracciolo family manuscript. cols. 243–398.
- Marino Sanudo the Younger: Lives of the dukes of Venice (Vitae ducum Venetorum), in Italian (Vite de' duchi di Venezia), from 421 to 1493, from a manuscript in the Biblioteca Estense. cols. 399–1252.

=== Volume 23 ===
Muratori, Lodovico Antonio, ed. (1733). Rerum italicarum scriptores (in Latin and Italian). Vol. 23. Milan: Societatis Palatinae.

- Dedication to the College of Judges and Knights of Milan, (Note: Il Collegio dei giudici e dei cavalieri di Milano was responsible for overseeing the administration of justice and the protection of the city in the Renaissance period: by the 18th century it had become a social and cultural organisation.) with an engraving by Francesco Zucchi
- Antonio Hyvani: (Note: Antonio Ivani (1430–1482) was a notary and historian in Liguria whose early career was spent in the service of Ludovico Fregoso, both at his feudal base at Sarzana and as Doge in Genoa. He was involved in missions to Cosimo de' Medici and Francesco Sforza and through these contacts became chancellor of Volterra from 1466 until 1471 when he fell out with powerful local interests over the management of the valuable alum mines. This was a precursor to the siege of Volterra by Florence. Over 700 of his letters have survived, capturing his views on current events, but he also studied and recorded local Etruscan archeology.) Short treatise on the Volterra war of 1472 (Commentariolus de bello Volaterrano), from manuscripts held by the counts of Guidoni and the Strozziana Library, cols. 1–20.
- Lodriso Crivelli: Two books on the expedition of Pope Pius II against the Turks (Libri duo de expeditione Pii papae secundi in Turcas), from a manuscript acquired by Filippo Argelati, cols. 21–80.
- Jacopo Gherardi (Volaterrano): (Note: Jacopo Gherardi (1434–1516) was born in Volterra into a wealthy family, and although he trained in Florence as a banker, he entered holy orders. He served in Siena and then Rome and was secretary to Jacopo Piccolomini-Ammannati until the cardinal died in 1479. He then worked closely with Sixtus IV, helping to build up the Vatican Library. On Sixtus' death (1484), he retired briefly to Volterra before being drawn back into papal service as a diplomat. In 1492 retired again to Volterra, and wrote his Diarium.) Roman Diary (Diarium Romanum) from 1472 to 1484, from a manuscript in the Biblioteca Estense, cols. 81–200.
- Agostino Patrizi de Piccolomini: Visit of Frederick III to Pope Paul II (Descriptio adventus Friderici III imperatoris ad Paulum papam II), from a manuscript in the collection of Jean Mabillon, cols. 201–216.
- Ludvico Raimo, et al.: (Note: Raimo was a Neapolitan family with close connections to the court. The Annales were started by Franzone, a tax collector, who covered 1197 to 1468, and developed by Ludovico the Elder, a treasury official, then Lancelot (covering 1485 to 1487), who joined the Order of the Knights of Jerusalem and fought in the Levant, and finally Ludovico the Younger, a finance officer in the court, who covered 1487 to 1503 but was not published here.) Annals of Raimo (Annales de Raimo), an outline history of Naples from 1197 to 1486, from a manuscript in the collection of Ignazio Maria Como, cols. 217–240.
- Antonius Gallus: (Note: Antonius Gallus (1503–1572), also known as Antonio Galli or Antonio di Gaio, was a Genoese historian, jurist, and humanist. He held various positions in the Genoese government, including as a judge and ambassador. Gallus was a significant figure in the intellectual and cultural life of Genoa in the early modern period.) Historical essays on the deeds of the people of Genoa and on the navigation of Columbus (Opuscula historica de rebus gestis populi Genuensis et de navigatione Columbi), from a Genoese manuscript, cols. 241–304.
- Benvenuto Sangiorgio: (Note: Benvenuto Sangiorgio (1450 – Casale Monferrato, 1527), also known as Benvenuto San Giorgio, Benvenuto da San Giorgio and Benvenuto di Sangiorgio, was a Piedmontese diplomat and humanist, Count of Biandrate, Knight of Jerusalem, president of the senate under William VIII, Marquis of Montferrat.) History of Montferrat (Historia Montis-Ferrati) from c. 950 to 1490, previously published, cols. 305–762.
- Allegretto Allegretti: (Note: Allegretto degli Allegretti (fl. c. 1480), an eminent Sienese nobleman, was involved in many of the events he narrates in his diaries.) Sienese journal (Ephemerides Senenses) in Italian, from 1450 to 1496, from a manuscript in the collection of Uberto Benvoglienti, cols. 763–860.
- Girolamo Albertucci de' Borselli: (Note: Girolamo Albertucci de' Borselli (1432–97), also known as Hieronimus de Albertutiis, Hieronymus de Bonomia or Hieronimus de Bursellis, was a popular preacher, known for his sermons throughout Tuscany. He was appointed Inquisitor-General of Bologna in 1494. Cronica gestorum ac factorum memorabilium civitatis Bononiæ (Chronicle of the events and memorable facts of the city of Bologna) is an annalistic chronicle from the foundation of Bologna to 1497.) Annals of Bologna (Annales Bononienses) from 1418 to 1497, from a manuscript in Bologna, cols. 863-916.
- Andrea Navagero: A history of Venice (Historia Veneta) in Italian, from its origins to 1498, from a manuscript in the Biblioteca Estense, cols. 919–1216.

=== Volume 24 ===
Muratori, Lodovico Antonio, ed. (1738). Rerum italicarum scriptores (in Latin and Italian). Vol. 24. Milan: Societatis Palatinae.

- Dedication to Francis Stephen of Lorraine (later Francis I, Holy Roman Emperor) and Maria Theresa of Hapsburg with an allegorical engraving with an oval portrait of the dedicatees by Francesco Zugno engraved by Francesco Zucchi.
- Marino Sanudo the Younger: The French War, events in Italy carried out by Charles VIII and Louis XII (De Bello Gallico, sive de rebus in Italia gestis a Carolo VIII, et Lodovico XII) from 1494 to 1500, in Italian, from a manuscript in the Biblioteca Estense, cols. 1–166.
- Anon.: Ferrara journal (Diarium Ferrariense) from 1409 to 1502, in Italian, from a manuscript in the Biblioteca Estense, cols. 169–408.
- Pietro Cirneo: The Four Books on Corsican Affairs (De rebus Corsicis) from the time of the Romans to 1506, from a manuscript in the French Royal Library (Bibliothecae Christianissimi regis), cols. 409–506..
- Bartolomeo Senarega of Genoa: Commentary on Genoese affairs (De rebus Genuensibus commentaria) from 1488 to 1514 from a manuscript in the Vatican, cols. 509–634.

APPENDIX (Works which arrived too late to include in the earlier chronological volumes. (Note: Muratori notes: The remaining works, which are to be published here, have reached my hands later than anticipated. They were meant to be included in the previous volumes, following a chronological order, as much as possible, but it seemed necessary to postpone their inclusion. I had indeed planned to publish them in the Appendix of my Italic Middle Ages Antiquities, which I have prepared for publication. However, this final volume of Italian Affairs preempted their inclusion to avoid the perception of leaving it significantly thinner than the preceding volumes.))

- Anonymus Valesianus: Excerpts on Constantius Chlorus, Constantine the Great, and other emperors (De Constantio Chloro, Constantino Magno et aliis imperatoribus), previously published by Henri Valois, reprinted with annotations by Adrien de Valois (Note: Adrien Valois or Adrien de Valois (1607–1692), brother of Henri Valois, was a French historian and poet. He was appointed royal historian in 1664.), royal historian. edita.
- Anon: Fragments on the history of Pisa (Fragmenta Historiae Pisanae) in the Pisan dialect, from 1091 to 1337, plus other material (in Latin) from 1270 to 1280 by Guido de Vallechia, (Note: Guido di Vallechia (d. before 1315) was a respected Pisan judge and diplomat who went on to become an Augustinian canon and priest. Guido's three Libri memoriales are not strictly speaking a chronicle. The first is a list of his father's vassals and territories; the second is a record of events in the family territories in 1270–90; and the third consists of copies of legal and other documents relating to the family possessions.) from the collection of Antonio Nicolini, and another in the Strozzi Library, cols. 641-694.
- [Bartholomew] Nicolaus of Ferrara: (Note: Nicolaus of Ferrara or Nicolaus Ferrariensis (d. c. 1390 became abbot of the Benedictine abbey of San Bartolomeo, near Ferrara. Niccolò II d'Este, Marquis of Ferrara was the patron of his polyhistoria, or polistoro, a universal chronicle from the Creation to 1383, divided into four books, the first three of which focus on Roman history while the fourth is a history of Ferrara.) Universal history (Polyhistoria) in Italian from 1287 to 1367, from the collection of Boniface Rangoni (Note: Boniface-Marie, Marquis Rangoni, (1633–1696), was Chamberlain of the Duke of Modena. The Duke also appointed him as the Governor of Reggio and sent him as his minister to James II of England, his brother-in-law.), cols. 695–848.
- Anon: Annals of the city of Arezzo (Annales urbis Arretinae) from 1192 to 1343, from the collection of Francesco Redi, cols. 851–882.
- [Stephen, abbot of Montis Alti]: Brief history of the monastery at Nardò (Chronicon Neritinum) from 1090 to 1368, extended by another to 1412, from the collection of Giovanni Bernardino Tafuri, cols. 883–922. [Shown to be a forgery.]
  - [Angelo Tafuro]: Description of the war undertaken by the Venetians (Descriptio Belli a Venetis) in the Province of Otranto in 1484. [Part of the same forgery.]
- Anon (Note: The Chronicon Sublacense is not written by a single author but by a series of monks who were not always overly concerned about accuracy. It is the only source for the history of the Benedictine monastery of Subiaco, near Tivoli, in the diocese of Rome.) Chronicle of Subiaco (Chronicon Sublacense), or catalog of the abbots of the Subiaco monastery from around the year 595 to 1390 from a Roman manuscript, cols. 925-966.
- Antonio Petri: (Note: Little is known of Antonio di Pietro dello Schiavo other than he was born in Rome and there is no record of him after 1428. The first page of the manuscript of the Diarium romanum is damaged, thus concealing his full name, but scholars have identified him as Dello Schiavo.) Roman Diary (Diarium romanum) from the year 1404 to 1417, from a manuscript in the Biblioteca Estense, cols. 969–1066. (Note: The Diarium covers a period of political instability in Rome from 19 October 1404 and the arrival of Ladislaus of Naples to bring help to the Roman population. The major events during fifteen years of important change that followed are described with meticulous detail, the last of which contained the election of Pope Martin V and the end of the Western Schism.)
- Antonio Nerli: (Note: Antonio Nerli (died-in circa 1420) was born into an aristocratic family from Siena and became prior of the Basilica of Sant'Andrea, Mantua in 1393. He moved to San Benedetto Polirone in 1407 and began the history of the Sant'Andrea. After a period of imprisonment in Brescia he ended up as abbot of San Lorenzo fuori le mura in Rome.) Brief Chronicle of the Benedictine monastery of San Andrea in Mantua (Breve chronicon monasterii Mantuani Sancti Andreae Ord. Benedict), from 1017 to 1418, from a manuscript in Polirone Abbey, cols. 1069–1084.
- Anon: Fragments of Sicilian History (Fragmenta Siculae historiae) from 1287 to 1434, from the collection of Innocenzo Roccaforte, (Note: Innocenzo Roccaforte (b. 1666) was a Palermo cleric and scholar who amassed a large library in his quest to write a universal journal.) cols. 1085–1100.
- Paolo Petrone: Historical Miscellany (Miscellanea historica Pauli filii Laelii Petroni romani), from 1433 to 1446, from a manuscript in the Vatican, cols. 1101–1130.
- Michele Savonarola: Short treatise on the praises of Padua (Commentariolus de laudibus Patavii) composed in 1440, from the collection of Sertorio Orsato, (Note: Sertorio Orsato (Latin: Ursatus) (1617–1678) was born into a patrician Padua family and graduated in philosophy at seventeen. His main interest was unrecorded ancient monument inscriptions. In 1670 the University of Padua offered him the chair of physics. He was subsequently tasked with writing a history of Padua.) cols. 1133–1186.
- Giuliano of Cividale del Friuli: Fragments of the Chronicle of Friuli (Fragmenta chronici Foroiuliensis) with additions from 1252 to 1364, from the collection of Giuseppe Bini, (Note: Giuseppe Bini (1689–1773), priest and scholar from Friuli, was connected to the Collorado family and was secretary to Girolamo di Colloredo, imperial governor of Milan, when he began corresponding with Muratori. In 1726 Colloredo died suddenly and Bini found himself assigned to the Bassa Friulana parish of Flambro where he worked on historical documents from the region. Muratori was aware of the Fragmenta chronici Foroiuliensis but was unable to access it until Bini stepped in.) cols. 1189–1230.

=== Volume 25 ===
Muratori, Lodovico Antonio, ed. (1751). Rerum italicarum scriptores (in Latin). Vol. 25. Milan: Societatis Palatinae.

- Dedication to Giuseppe Pozzobonelli with an engraving by Marc’Antonio Dal Re. Allegorical frontispiece by F. Zugni, engraved by Francesco Zucchi.
- Porcellio Pandoni: Commentaries on the Deeds of Jacopo Piccinino (Commentaria Rerum gestarum a Jacobo Picinino) during the 1453 war between the Venetians and Francesco Sforza, from the collection of Marco Foscarini, pp. [2], cols. 1–66.
- Georgius Merula: The Second Decade of the History of Milan (Historiarum Mediolani decas secunda), from a manuscript in the collection of Giovanni Andrea Irico, (Note: Giovanni Andrea Irico (1704–1782), priest and scholar, was a prefect of the Ambrosian Library in Milan from 1748 until 1764 after which he moved back to his birth parish of Trino as provost.Michaud, Louis-Gabriel (1856). "Irico, abbé Jean-André". Biographie universelle (Michaud) ancienne et moderne (in French). Vol. 20. Paris: Desplaces. p. 365.) cols. 69–248.
- Vespasiano da Bisticci: The lives of Eugene IV and Nicholas V (Eugenii IV et Nicolai V pontificum Romanorum vitae) with a dedication to Luc'Antonio degli Albizi, (Note: Luca degli Albizi (1382–1458) was the head of the Florentine Albizi family after the exile of his brother who had taken sides against Cosimo de' Medici. He became Cosimo's trusted man and obtained important positions as ambassador in Milan, Rome and Venice.) from a manuscript in the collection of Lorenzo Mehus, (Note: Lorenzo Mehus (1717–1802) was a scholar who for the Prussian antiquarian Philipp von Stosch. The young Mehus edited and published letters and manuscripts by early Florentine writers and his interpretations were disputed by other scholars, but gradually bibliophiles and librarians began to rely on his expertise.) cols. 249–290.
- Leon Battista Alberti: Commentary on the Porcari conspiracy (Note: Stefano Porcari’s conspiracy against Pope Nicholas V written immediately after the thwarted plot in 1453.) (Commentarius de coniuratione porcaria), from a manuscript in the collection of Lorenzo Mehus, cols. 295–304 (Vita Leonis Baptistae Alberti) and cols. 307–314 (De porcaria coniuratione).
- Antonio Agostini: (Note: Antonio degli Agostini was a lawyer from San Miniato who lived in Piombino and who was an eyewitness to the siege.)History of the siege of Piombino (Historia obsidionis Plumbini) in 1448, a poem in octaves and triplets, from a manuscript in the collection of Lorenzo Mehus, cols. 317–370.
- Francesco Aleardi: Speech in praise of Francesco Sforza (Oratio in laudem Francisci Sfortiae vicecomitis) delivered in Verona in 1450, from a manuscript in the Biblioteca Ambrosiana, cols. 373–418.
- Girolamo Crivelli: (Note: Little is known of Sforza courtier Girolamo Crivelli (d. c. 1500) who was entrusted to deliver the funeral oration for Bianca Maria Visconti in 1468. He would have associated with other prominent courtiers; Pier Candido Decembrio, Francesco Filelfo (who also composed an oration for the funeral) and Georgius Merula. His name occasionally appears in letters and dedications of the time.) Oration in praise of Bianca Maria Visconti (Oratio parentalis in laudem Blancae Mariae Sfortiae Vicecomitis) from a manuscript in the Biblioteca Ambrosiana, cols. 423–432.
- Giovanni Montani: Funeral oration for Filippo Maria Visconti (Oratio funebris in morte Philippi Mariae Vicecomitis, Mediolani ducis), from a manuscript in the Biblioteca Ambrosiana, cols. 433–442.
- Eliseo della Manna: The victory of Cremona under Nicolò Piccinino in the naval battle against the Venetians (Victoria Cremonensium in navali bello sub Nicolao Picinino ... contra venetos ...) in 1431, from a manuscript in the Biblioteca Ambrosiana, cols. 443–452.
- Agostino Rosso d'Aragona: In praise of Gian Galeazzo Sforza (in laudem Johannis Galeatii Sfortiae Vicecomitis) in 1478, from a manuscript in the Biblioteca Ambrosiana, cols. 453–462.
- Leonardo Griffi: (Note: Leonardo Griffi (c. 1440 – 1485) was a poet attached to the Sforza court. His poem recounting the defeat of Braccio da Montone at the hands of the very young Francesco Sforza was judged by Girolamo Tiraboschi to be "one of the best poems published in that century". Under Sforza sponsorship he was secretary to Francesco Della Rovere throughout his term as Pope Sixtus IV and subsequently to Innocent VIII.) On the conflict with Braccio of Perugia, leader of the forces at Aquila (De conflictu Brachii Perusini armorum ductoris apud Aquilam) from a manuscript in the Biblioteca Ambrosiana, cols. 463–478.
- Girolamo Tartarotti: On the authors praised by Andrea Dandolo in the Venetian Chronicle (Note: A history of Venice from its founding to 1358, commonly attributed to Piero di Giustiniano Giustinian. The earlier part of the chronicle is dependent on earlier Venetian histories, especially the Chronica brevis of Andrea Dandolo.) (De auctoribus ab Andrea Dandulo laudatis in chronico veneto), epistolary dissertation addressed to Francesco Giuseppe Rosmini, (Note: Francesco Giuseppe Rosmini (1706–1768) was born in Rovereto and practised law in his hometown and later in Vienna. He amassed a large library, habitually frequented by his friend Girolamo Tartarotti, with whom in 1731 he participated in the foundation of the Accademia dei Dodonis.) cols. I-XXVIII.

INDEXES

- Catalog of authors and works contained in each volume, pp. 1–40.
- Catalog of authors in alphabetical order, pp. 43–82.
- Catalog of authors arranged by location and region, pp. 83–127.
- Catalog of charters and other ancient documents in chronological order, pp. 129–158.
- Geographical index of provinces, cities, towns, and other places, as well as mountains and rivers, pp. 159–205.
- Index of families, pp. 207–370.

== Second Series (RIS2) ==
In 1900 a new edition (Rerum italicarum scriptores: Raccolta degli storici italiani dal cinquecento al millecinquecento, ordinata da L. A. Muratori, nuova edizione riveduta ampliata e corretta) was undertaken at the instigation of Giosuè Carducci, and continued by the Istituto storico italiano per il Medio Evo (Italian Historical Institute for the Middle Ages – "ISIME") under the direction of Pietro Fedele. It was published by Casa Editrice Scipione Lapi in Città di Castello from 1900 to 1917 (Lapi himself died in 1903) and then by Nicola Zanichelli in Bologna until 1975.

The numbering of the volumes follows the original series, but many volumes extend to multiple parts as they incorporate the original material plus commentaries by the new editors and extensive indexes, glossaries and bibliographies. Sections were released in instalments (it: fascolo), intended to be bound by the purchaser into complete volumes. In consequence, some volumes accessible via the Internet Archive are incomplete or, occasionally, incorrectly collated. The copies in the ISMIE library are most accurate and are available online via Biblioteca europea di informazione e cultura.

For many volumes publication dates are quoted for both the first and latest instalment as the final instalments, with detailed indexes, were often released many years later. In total, 117 volumes were published made up from 398 instalments. Publication terminated in 1975 leaving some volumes incomplete.

=== Volume 1 ===
Fiorini, Vittorio; Rossi, Giorgio, eds. (1900). Historia miscella di Landolfo Sagace. Rerum italicarum scriptores. Vol. 1 Part 1 (Nuova ed.). Cità di Castello: S. Lapi.

Colombo, Giuseppe & Colombo, Alessandro, eds. (1942). Anonymi Mediolanensis: Libellus de situ civitatis Mediolani, de adventu Barnabe Apostoli et de vitis priorum pontificum Mediolanensium. Rerum italicarum scriptores. Vol. 1 Part 2 (Nuova ed.). Bologna: Nicola Zanichelli.

Appendices:

1. Depositio Beate Memorie sacerdotis et episcopi Dionisii et vita eiusdem;
2. Sermo Beati Thome episcopi Mediolani;
3. Nomina episcoporum mediolanensis Eclesie.

=== Volume 2 ===
Simeoni, Luigi, ed. (1918). Veronae rythmica descriptio. Rerum italicarum scriptores. Vol. 2 Part 1 (Nuova ed.). Bologna: Nicola Zanichelli.

Testi Rasponi, Alessandro, ed. (1924). Codex pontificalis ecclesiae Ravennatis. Rerum italicarum scriptores. Vol. 2 Part 3 (Nuova ed.). Bologna: Nicola Zanichelli. [Incomplete due to the interruption of publication – no indexes.]

[Comprising the Liber pontificalis by Agnello (published in RIS Vol. 2, pt. 1), the Spicilegium ravennatis historiae (RIS Vol. 1, pt. 2) and other texts, not all published by Muratori, from Cod. estense V. F. 19, new mark X. P. 49.]
Appendices: documents relating to the history of Ravenna including several 11th-century sources missed by Muratori.

=== Volume 3 ===
Zippel, Giacinto, ed. (1913). Platynae historici: Liber de vita Christi ac omnium pontificum (1–1474). Rerum italicarum scriptores. Vol. 3 Part 1a (Nuova ed.). Cità di Castello: S. Lapi (published 1932).

Toni, Diomede, ed. (1907). Il diario romano di Gaspare Pontani, già riferito al "Notaio del Nantiporto" (30 gennaio 1481 – 25 luglio 1492). Rerum italicarum scriptores. Vol. 3 Part 2 (Nuova ed.). Cità di Castello: S. Lapi (published 1908).

[Published in RIS under the title Diarium romanum auctore anonimo synchrono "Notario de Antiportu"]

Zimolo, Giulio C., ed. (1964). Le vite di Pio II, di Giovanni Antonio Campano & Bartolomeo Platina. Rerum italicarum scriptores. Vol. 3 Part 3 (Nuova ed.). Bologna: Nicola Zanichelli.

Zippel, Giuseppe, ed. (1904). Le vite di Paolo II di Gaspare da Verona e Michele Canensi. Rerum italicarum scriptores. Vol. 3 Part 16 (Nuova ed.). Cità di Castello: S. Lapi (published 1911).

=== Volume 4 ===
Cutolo, Alessandro, ed. (1942). Landulphi senioris: Mediolanensis historiae libri quatuor. Rerum italicarum scriptores. Vol. 4 Part 2 (Nuova ed.). Bologna: Nicola Zanichelli.

=== Volume 5 ===
Pontieri, Ernesto, ed. (1925). De rebus gestis Rogerii Calabriae et Siciliae comitis et Roberti Guiscardi ducis fratris eius, by Gaufredo Malaterra monacho benedictino. Rerum italicarum scriptores. Vol. 5 Part 1 (Nuova ed.). Bologna: Nicola Zanichelli (published 1928).

[Published in RIS under the title: Gaufredi Malaterrae monachi benedictini Historìa Sicula; here followed by Annales Siculi, which Muratori published in Vol. V, pp. 603–606, under the title: Appendix ex codice Marchionis Jarratanae ad ultimum capitulum libri quarti Historiae Gaufredi Malaterrae.]

Simeoni, Luigi, ed. (1931). Vita Mathildis celeberrimae principis Italiae: carmine scripta a Donizone presbytero qui in Arce Canusina vixitseguono. Rerum italicarum scriptores. Vol. 5 Part 2 (Nuova ed.). Bologna: Nicola Zanichelli (published 1940).

Appendices:

1. Chartula Comitissae Mathildis super concessione bonorum suorum facta Romanae Ecclesiae;
2. Relatio de Thesauro Canusinae Ecclesiae Romam trasmisso, et recompensatione facta;
3. Vita Comitissae Mathildis oratione soluta (Epitome Polironensis).

Castiglioni, Carlo, ed. (1934). Landulphi junioris sive de Sancto Paulo: Historia Mediolanensis: ab anno 1095 usque ad annum 1137. Rerum italicarum scriptores. Vol. 5 Part 3 (Nuova ed.). Bologna: Nicola Zanichelli.

=== Volume 6 ===
Bertoni, Giulio, ed. (1907). Relatio translationis corporis sancti Geminiani (1099–1106). Rerum italicarum scriptores. Vol. 6 Part 1 (Nuova ed.). Città di Castello: S. Lapi.

Appendices:

1. Carmina Mutinensia dal cod. O.I.4 dell'Archivio capitolare;
2. Iscrizioni più antiche del Duomo di Modena;
3. Documento del secolo 10. concernente il Duomo preesistente all'attuale. Offerta annua di un palio a san Geminiano;
4. Miniature del cod. capitolare contenente la Relatio.

Gentile, Michele Lupo, ed. (1930). Bernardo Maragone: Annales Pisani. Rerum italicarum scriptores. Vol. 6 Part 2 (Nuova ed.). Bologna: Nicola Zanichelli (published 1936).

Appendices:

1. Gesta triumphalia per Pisanos facta de captione Hierusalem et civitatis Maioricarum et aliarum civitatum et de triumpho habito contra Ianuenses;
2. Chronicon Pisanum seu fragmentum auctoris incerti;
3. Chronicon aliud breve Pisanum incerti auctoris ab anno 1101 usque ad annum 1268.

Zimolo, Giulio, ed. (1937). Boncompagni: Liber de obsidione Ancone (1173). Rerum italicarum scriptores. Vol. 6 Part 3 (Nuova ed.). Bologna: Nicola Zanichelli.

[Published by Muratori under the title: Liber de obsidione Anconae a copiis Friderici I Imperatoris anno MCLXXII peracta, ejusque urbis liberatione.]

Cerasoli, Leone Mattei, ed. (1941). Vitae quatuor priorum abbatum Cavensium; Alferii, Leonis, Petri et Constabilis, by Abbott Hugone of Venusino. Rerum italicarum scriptores. Vol. 6 Part 5 (Nuova ed.). Bologna: Nicola Zanichelli.

=== Volume 7 ===
Garufi, Carlo Alberto, ed. (1909). Romualdi Salernitani: Chronicon (130–1178). Rerum italicarum scriptores. Vol. 7 Part 1 (Nuova ed.). Città di Castello: S. Lapi (published 1935).

Garufi, Carlo Alberto, ed. (1936). Ryccardi de Sancto Germano notarii: Chronica. Rerum italicarum scriptores. Vol. 7 Part 2 (Nuova ed.). Bologna: Nicola Zanichelli (published 1938).

=== Volume 8 ===
Bonardi, Antonio, ed. (1905). Rolandini Patavini: Cronica in factis et circa facta Marchie Trivixane (c. 1200 -1262). Rerum italicarum scriptores. Vol. 8 Part 1 (Nuova ed.). Città di Castello: S. Lapi (published 1908).

Appendices:

1. Parmese edition of the Annali Patavini;
2. Muratori's edition of the Annali Patavini;
3. Liber regiminum Paduae;
4. List of bishops of Padua, published in RIS Vol. 8, cols. 361-64).

Soranzo, Giovanni, ed. (1909). Cronaca di Antonio Godi vicentino: dall'anno 1194 all'anno 1260. Rerum italicarum scriptores. Vol. 8 Part 2 (Nuova ed.). Città di Castello: S. Lapi.

Botteghi, L.A., ed. (1916). Chronicon Marchiae Tarvisinae et Lombardiae (1207–1270). Rerum italicarum scriptores. Vol. 8 Part 3 (Nuova ed.). Città di Castello: S. Lapi.

Soranzo, Giovanni, ed. (1913). Gerardi Maurisii: Cronica dominorum Ecelini et Alberici fratrum de Romano (1183–1237). Rerum italicarum scriptores. Vol. 6 Part 4 (Nuova ed.). Città di Castello: S. Lapi (published 1914).

[A summary in Leonine verse, composed for the chronicler by Taddeo Vicenza, is included.]

Botteghi, Giovanni, ed. (1921). Nicolai Smeregli Vincentini: Annales civitatis Vincentiae (1200–1312). Rerum italicarum scriptores. Vol. 8 Part 3 (Nuova ed.). Bologna: Nicola Zanichelli.

Appendix: A study by G. Soranzo on the apocryphal nature of Vita Ricciardi comitis Sancii Bonifacii published in RIS, Vol. 8, cols. 119–134.

=== Volume 9 ===
Calligaris, Giuseppe, ed. (1910). Fratris Stephanardi de Vicomercato; Liber de gestis in civitate Mediolani (1–1474). Rerum italicarum scriptores. Vol. 9 Part 1 (Nuova ed.). Cità di Castello: S. Lapi (published 1912).

Del Lungo, Isidoro, ed. (1907). Dino Compagni: Cronica di delle cose occorrenti ne' tempi suoi. Rerum italicarum scriptores. Vol. 9 Part 2 (Nuova ed.). Città di Castello: S. Lapi (published 1916).

Casatiglioni, Carlo, ed. (1935). Synodus provincialis Pergami habita a Castono sive Cassono Mediolani archiepiscopo anno 1311. Rerum italicarum scriptores. Vol. 9 Part 3 (Nuova ed.). Bologna: Nicola Zanichelli.

Segarizzi, Arnaldo, ed. (1907). Historia fratris Dulcini heresiarche, by an anonymous contemporary; De secta illorum qui se dicunt esse de ordine Apostolorum, by Bernardo Gui. Rerum italicarum scriptores. Vol. 9 Part 5 (Nuova ed.). Città di Castello: S. Lapi.

Appendices:

1. Note by Giovanni Antonio Boccino (1793);
2. Statement of a league against the heretics (1305);
3. Bulls issued by Clement V (1307);
4. Trial of the Guglielmites (1303);
5. Acts of the Holy Office of Bologna (1299);
6. Petrus Lucensis: Liber sententiarum;
7. The Trentino trial (1332).

Bonazzi, Giuliano, ed. (1902). Chronicon Parmense ab anno 1038 usque ad annum 1338. Rerum italicarum scriptores. Vol. 9 Part 9 (Nuova ed.). Cità di Castello: S. Lapi.

=== Volume 11 ===
Maiocchi, Rodolfo & Quintavalle, Ferruccio, eds. (1903). Anonymi Ticinensis: Liber de laudibus civitatis Ticinensis. Rerum italicarum scriptores. Vol. 11 Part 1 (Nuova ed.). Cità di Castello: S. Lapi (published 1906).

Appendices:

1. Cronica de Corporibus Sanctis Papie;
2. Sermo in depositione sancti Syri episcopi papiensis;
3. Cronica brevis de sanctis episcopis ticinensibus;
4. Descriptio situs Lombardie et omnium regionum eiusdem.

Meliconi, Celestino, ed. (1915). De proeliis Tusciae, poema: Fratris Raynerii de Grancis. Rerum italicarum scriptores. Vol. 11 Part 2 (Nuova ed.). Città di Castello: S. Lapi (published 1922). pp. 1–192 (line 1947). [Incomplete – stops at line 1947, no indexes.] Adrasto Barbi, Silvi, ed. (1907). Storie pistoresi (1300–134). Rerum italicarum scriptores. Vol. 11 Part 5 (Nuova ed.). Bologna: Nicola Zanichelli (published 1927).

=== Volume 12 ===
Pastorello, Ester, ed. (1940). Andreae Danduli ducis Venetiarum: Chronica per extensum descripta (46–1280). Rerum italicarum scriptores. Vol. 12 Part 1 (Nuova ed.). Bologna: Nicola Zanichelli (published 1927).

[Also contains Andreae Danduli ducis Venetiarum: Chronica brevis (46–1342).]
Appendices:

1. Acta nonnulla ad Venetam historiam spectantia saecul. XII, XIII, XIV;
2. Excerpta ex chronico Iohannis Bembi.

Pastorello, Ester, ed. (1922). Raphayni de Caresinis cancellarii Venetiarum: Chronica (1343–1388). Rerum italicarum scriptores. Vol. 12 Part 2 (Nuova ed.). Bologna: Nicola Zanichelli.

Sorbelli, Albano, ed. (1903). Dominici de Gravina notarii: Chronicon de rebus in Apulia gestis (1333–1350). Rerum italicarum scriptores. Vol. 12 Part 3 (Nuova ed.). Cità di Castello: S. Lapi (published 1909).

[Includes an obituary of Scipione Lapi by Vittorio Fiorini.]

Castiglioni, Carlo, ed. (1938). Gualvanei de la Flamma ordinis praedicatorum: Opusculum de rebus gestis ab Azone, Luchino et Johanne vicecomitibus ab anno 1328 usque ad annum 1342. Rerum italicarum scriptores. Vol. 12 Part 4 (Nuova ed.). Bologna: Nicola Zanichelli.

Pagnin, Beniamino, ed. (1941). Guillelmi de Cortusiis: Chronica de novitatibus Padue et Lombardie. Rerum italicarum scriptores. Vol. 12 Part 5 (Nuova ed.). Bologna: Nicola Zanichelli (published 1975).

=== Volume 13 ===
Steiner, Carlo, ed. (1915). Conforto da Costoza: Frammenti di Storia vicentina (1371–1387). Rerum italicarum scriptores. Vol. 13 Part 1 (Nuova ed.). Cità di Castello: S. Lapi.

[Published by Muratori under the title: Conforti Pulicis Vicentini: Annalium patriae fragmenta 1371 – 1387.]

Scaramella, Gino, ed. (1918). Matthei Palmerii: Vita Nicolai Acciaioli. Rerum italicarum scriptores. Vol. 13 Part 2 (Nuova ed.). Bologna: Nicola Zanichelli (published 1934).

Appendices:
1. Letter from Niccola Acciaioli to Angelo Soderini (26 Dec 1364);
2. Actual will of Niccola Acciaioli (30 Sep 1359);
3. Reputed will of Niccola Acciaioli (30 Sep 1359).

Paladino, Giuseppe, ed. (1921). Bartholomaei de Neocastro: Historia Sicula (1250–1293). Rerum italicarum scriptores. Vol. 13 Part 3 (Nuova ed.). Bologna: Nicola Zanichelli (published 1922).

=== Volume 14 ===
Tallone, Armando, ed. (1908). Antonii Astesani: De ejus vita et fortunae varietate, carmen (380–1341). Rerum italicarum scriptores. Vol. 14 Part 1 (Nuova ed.). Cità di Castello: S. Lapi (published 1912).

=== Volume 15 ===
Bini, Arturo & Grazzini, Giovanni, eds. (1918). Cronica dei fatti d'Arezzo, di Ser Bartolomeo di ser Gorello. Rerum italicarum scriptores. Vol. 15 Part 1 (Nuova ed.). Bologna: Nicola Zanichelli (published 1921). [Incomplete – no indexes.]

[Published by Muratori under the title: Gorelli Aretini notarti poema italica scriptum rebus gestis in civitate aretina ab amia MCCCX usque ad annum MCCCLXXXIV.]

Bini, Arturo, ed. (1933). Liber inferni Aretii: cronica in terza rima, by Giovanni L. De Bonis. Rerum italicarum scriptores. Vol. 15 Part 1 (Nuova ed.). Bologna: Nicola Zanichelli. [Incomplete – no indices.] Massera, Aldo Francesco, ed. (1922). Cronache Malatestiane dei secoli XIV e XV (1295–1385 & 1416–1452). Rerum italicarum scriptores. Vol. 15 Part 2 (Nuova ed.). Bologna: Nicola Zanichelli (published 1924). [Incomplete – no prefaces or indexes.]

Appended to the texts published in RIS Vol. 15 (pp. 889–968) entitled Chronicon ariminense ab Anno circiter MCLXXXVIII usque ad Annuiti MCCCLXXXV, auctore Anonymo, ac deinde continuatum per alterum Anonymum usque ad Annum MCCCCLII are:

1. Cronaca malatestiana by Baldo Branchi (−1474);
2. Estratti dalla Cronaca universale by Broglia di Tartaglia da Lavello (−1478);
3. Notamenti by unknown 15th century authors (1468–1495);
4. Notamenti by Francesco di Sante da San Clemente (1468–1495).

Bertoni, Giulio & Vicini, Emilio Paolo, eds. (1908). Chronicon Estense, cum additamentis usque ad annum 1478. Rerum italicarum scriptores. Vol. 15 Part 3 (Nuova ed.). Cità di Castello: S. Lapi (published 1937). pp. 1–192. [Incomplete – "The preface will be published with the appendices".]

Appendices:

1. Iconografia estense (cod. est. x. 4. 5. 16);
2. Extracts from the Storia Ferrarese of P. Prisciano.

Casini, Tommaso, ed. (1917). Chronicon Mutinense: Iohannis de Bazano (1188–1363). Rerum italicarum scriptores. Vol. 15 Part 4 (Nuova ed.). Bologna: Nicola Zanichelli (published 1919). [Incomplete – ends at Appendix 1.]

Appendices:

1. Fragmenta Memorialis Potestatum Mutinae (1204 -1248);
2. Excerpta ex Chronico Nonantulano antiquissimo (1000–1187);
3. Confines totius episcopatus Mutinae circumcirca (1222);
4. Mirabilia anni Domini 1348;
5. Chronicon Frignani magistri Nicolai de Vianora (1156–1347) cum additamentis variorum (usque ad saec. 15.).

Fumi, Luigi, ed. (1902). Ephemerides Urbevetanae dal Codice Vaticano Urbinate 1745, I. (1342–1369). Rerum italicarum scriptores. Vol. 15 Part 5 No.1 (Nuova ed.). Cità di Castello: S. Lapi (published 1920).

[Discorso Historico con molti accidenti occorsi in Orvieto et in altre parti, published by Muratori under the title: Ephemerides Urbevetanae.]
Appendices:

1. Register of original deeds for the jurisdictions of the municipality compiled in 1339 and continued until the middle of the 14th century;
2. Annales Urbevetani:

Cronica antiqua (1151–1313)
Cronica Potestatum (1194–1322)
Fragments (1284–1353);

3. Cronica Urbevetana, fragments (1294–1304 & 1364–1406);
4. Cronaca del Conte Francesco di Montemarte e Corbara (1333–1400);
5. Cronaca di Luca di Domenico Manenti (1174–1413);
6. Estratti dalle Historie di Cipriano Manenti (1325–1376);
7. Ricordi di ser Matteo di Cataluccio da Orvieto (1422–1458).

Fumi, Luigi, ed. (1902). Ephemerides Urbevetanae dal Codice Vaticano Urbinate 1745, II. (1482–1514). Rerum italicarum scriptores. Vol. 15 Part 5 No.2 (Nuova ed.). Cità di Castello: S. Lapi (published 1920).

Appendix: 8. Diario di Tommaso di Silvestro (1482–1514).

Lisini, Alessandro & Iacometti, Fabio, eds. (1931). Cronache senesi. Rerum italicarum scriptores. Vol. 15 Part 6 (Nuova ed.). Bologna: Nicola Zanichelli (published 1939).

Contents:

1. Kalendarium ecclesiae metropolitanae Senensis;
2. Cronaca senese with facts about the city and its territory;
3. Part of the Cronica senese of Anonimo (1313–1320);
4. Cronica senese known by the name of Paolo di Tommaso Montauri;
5. Cronaca senese attributed to Angelo di Tura del Grasso, known as the Cronica maggiore.

Lisini, Alessandro & Iacometti, Fabio, eds. (1931). Cronache senesi. Rerum italicarum scriptores. Vol. 15 Part 6 (Nuova ed.). Bologna: Nicola Zanichelli (published 1939). [Incomplete – pp. 945-end, no indexes]

Contents:

6. Cronaca Senese of Donato di Neri and his son Neri;
7. Cronaca Senese known by the name of Paolo di Tommaso Montauri (Continuation 1381–1431);
8. Cronaca senese of Tommaso Fenici;
9. Part of a Sienese journal of Cristoforo Cantoni.

=== Volume 16 ===
Zaccagnini, Guido, ed. (1908). Sozomeni Pistoriensis presbyteri: Chronicon universale (1411–1455). Rerum italicarum scriptores. Vol. 16 Part 1 (Nuova ed.). Città di Castello: S. Lapi.

[Replaces the following two fragments published in the original edition:
1. Excerpta ex Historia Sozomeni pist. ab an. 1001 ad an. 1294 (Vol. XXVI, Addit. Tartini I, cols. 5-208);
2. Specimen Historiae Sozomeni preso, pist. ab an. Ch. 1362 usque ad an. 1410 (Vol. XVI, cols. 1063–1198).]

Capasso, Carlo, ed. (1928). Chronicon Bergomense guelpho-ghibellinum: ab anno 1378 usque ad annum 1407. Rerum italicarum scriptores. Vol. 16 Part 2 (Nuova ed.). Bologna: Nicola Zanichelli (published 1940). [Incomplete – no indexes.]

[Published by Muratori under the title: Chronicon guelpho-ghibellinum, auctore Castello de Castello, ab anno MCCCLXXVIII usque ad annum MCCCCVII.]

Massèra, Aldo Francesco, ed. (1912). Marcha di Marco Battagli da Rimini (1212–1354). Rerum italicarum scriptores. Vol. 16 Part 3 (Nuova ed.). Cità di Castello: S. Lapi (published 1913).

[Published by Muratori with the title Breviarium italicae historiae a temporibus Friderici II Augusti usque ad annum MCCCLIV ab anonymo italo, sed synchrono, auctore conscriptum.]
Appendices:

1. Nobilissimorum clarissime originis heroum de Malatestis regalis ystoria (c. 1200 - c. 1380);
2. Rifacimento della rubrica del Battagli De origine dominorum de Malatestis (late 14th century);
3. Continuatio cronice dominorum de Malatestis by Tobia Borghi (1353–1448).

Cognasso, Francesco, ed. (1925). Petri Azarii: Liber gestorum in Lombardia. Rerum italicarum scriptores. Vol. 16 Part 4 (Nuova ed.). Bologna: Nicola Zanichelli (published 1939).

=== Volume 17 ===
Medin, Antonio & Tolomei, Guido, eds. (1909). Galeazzo & Bartolomeo Gatari: Cronaca carrarese, I.. Rerum italicarum scriptores. Vol. 17 Part 1 No.1 (Nuova ed.). Città di Castello: S. Lapi (published 1931).

[Replaces the text published in RIS entitled Chronicon patavinum italica lingua conscriptum ab anno MCCCXI usque ad attn. MCCCCVI, auctore Andrea de Gataris; adntctitur eadem Historia qualis scripta fuit a Galeatio Gataro Andreae patre.]

Cessi, Roberto, ed. (1942). Cronaca carrarese, II., Appendices. Rerum italicarum scriptores. Vol. 17 Part 1 No.2 (Nuova ed.). Bologna: Nicola Zanichelli (published 1948). pp. 1–282.

Contents:

1. Gesta magnifica domus Carrariensis;
2. Istoria della presente (1372–73) guerra; [Missing.]
3. Cronica minora (1383). [Missing.]

Cessi, Roberto, ed. (1942). Cronaca carrarese, III. Rerum italicarum scriptores. Vol. 17 Part 1 No.3 (Nuova ed.). Bologna: Nicola Zanichelli (published 1965).

Contents:

1. Storia della guerra per i confini by Nicoletto D'Alessio;
2. La «Ystoria de metier Francesco Zovene»;
3. La guerra da Trivixo (1383).

Balbi, Giovanna Petti, ed. (1975). Georgii et Iohannis Stellae: Annales genuenses. Rerum italicarum scriptores. Vol. 17 Part 2 (Nuova ed.). Bologna: Nicola Zanichelli.

Gabotto, Ferdinando, ed. (1911). 'Chronicon parvum Ripaltae, seu, Chronica pedemontana minora. Rerum italicarum scriptores. Vol. 17 Part 3 (Nuova ed.). Cità di Castello: S. Lapi.

=== Volume 18 ===
Sorbelli, Albano, ed. (1906). Corpus chronicorum Bononiensium: Text of the chronicles I.. Rerum italicarum scriptores. Vol. 18 Part 1 No.1 (Nuova ed.). Città di Castello: S. Lapi (published 1939).

Sorbelli, Albano, ed. (1910). Corpus chronicorum Bononiensium: Text of the chronicles II.. Rerum italicarum scriptores. Vol. 18 Part 1 No.2 (Nuova ed.). Città di Castello: S. Lapi (published 1938). pp. 1–616.

Sorbelli, Albano, ed. (1916). Corpus chronicorum Bononiensium: Text of the chronicles III.. Rerum italicarum scriptores. Vol. 18 Part 1 No.3 (Nuova ed.). Città di Castello: S. Lapi (published 1939).

Sorbelli, Albano, ed. (1910). Corpus chronicorum Bononiensium: Text of the chronicles IV.. Rerum italicarum scriptores. Vol. 18 Part 1 No.4 (Nuova ed.). Città di Castello: S. Lapi (published 1938).

Frati, Lodovico; Sorbelli, Albano, eds. (1902). Matthaei de Griffonibus: Memoriale historicum de rebus Bononiensium (4448 BCE-1472). Rerum italicarum scriptores. Vol. 18 Part 2 (Nuova ed.). Cità di Castello: S. Lapi.

Scaramella, Gino, ed. (1917). Il tumulto dei Ciompi, cronache e memorie. Rerum italicarum scriptores. Vol. 18 Part 3 (Nuova ed.). Bologna: Nicola Zanichelli (published 1934).

Contents:

1. Chronicles and records of the public Magistrates of June and July 1378:

a) Cronaca of Alamanno Acciaioli (published in RIS, Vol. 18 with the title: Caso o Tumulto dei Ciompi del'anno 1378 scritto da Gino Capponi), with anonymous additions;
b) Ricordanza di Simone Peruzzi dell' ufficio degli Otto della Guerra (Jun 1378);
c) Ricordanza of Luigi Guicciardini, Gonfaloniere di Giustizia (Jul 1378);

2. Cronaca di Nofri di Piero delle Riformagioni (1378–1380);
3. Cronaca prima di Anonimo (1378–1387), known as the Cronaca dello Sguittinatore;
4. Cronaca seconda di Anonimo (1378), known as the Diario Compagnano;
5. Cronaca terza di Anonimo (1378–1381), known as the Cronachetta Strozziana;
6. Two letters on the triumph and fall of Ciompi;

a) Copy of a letter written on the news of 1378 in Florence (23 Jul 1378);
b) Copy of a letter sent by Nanni Bonifazli to a friend (9 Sep 1378).

=== Volume 19 ===
Scaramella, Gino, ed. (1914). Matthei Palmerii: De captivitate Pisarum liber. Rerum italicarum scriptores. Vol. 19 Part 2 (Nuova ed.). Cità di Castello: S. Lapi.

Santini, Emilio & Di Pierro, Carmine, eds. (1914). Leonardo Bruni Aretino: Historiarum Florentini populi libri XII; & Rerum suo tempore gestarum, commentarius. Rerum italicarum scriptores. Vol. 19 Part 3 (Nuova ed.). Cità di Castello: S. Lapi (published 1926).

[Rerum suo tempore gestarum Commentarius is from Raccolta muratoriana.]

Valentini, Roberto, ed. (1929). Braccii Perusini vita et gesta: ab anno 1368 usque ad 1424, auctore Johanne Antonio Campano. Rerum italicarum scriptores. Vol. 19 Part 4 (Nuova ed.). Bologna: Nicola Zanichelli. [No indexes.]

Pasini, Adamo, ed. (1931). Chronicon fratris Hieronymi de Forlivio: ab anno 1397 usque ad annum 1433. Rerum italicarum scriptores. Vol. 19 Part 5 (Nuova ed.). Bologna: Nicola Zanichelli.

Zonta, Gasparo, ed. (1940). Vita Caroli Zeni, auctore Iacobo Zeno. Rerum italicarum scriptores. Vol. 19 Part 6 (Nuova ed.). Bologna: Nicola Zanichelli (published 1941).

=== Volume 20 ===
Butti, Attilio; Fossati, Felice & Petraglione, Giuseppe, eds. (1925). Petri Candidi Decembrii: Opuscula historica. Rerum italicarum scriptores. Vol. 20 Part 1a (Nuova ed.). Bologna: Nicola Zanichelli (published 1958). pp. 1–384.

Contents:

1. Vita Philippi Mariae III Ligurum ducis;
2. Annotatio rerum gestarum in vita Francisci Sfortiae IV Mediolanensium ducis;
3. Panegyricus in funere Nicolai Picenini;
4. De laudibus Mediolanensium urbis panegyricus.

Simeoni, Luigi, ed. (1920). Fr. Johannis Ferrariensis: Ex annalium libris marchionum Estensium excerpta (0–1454). Rerum italicarum scriptores. Vol. 20 Part 2 (Nuova ed.). Bologna: Nicola Zanichelli (published 1936).

Appendices:

1. Viazo al Sancto Sepolcro per lo Marchese Nicolo da Este (1413);
2. Viaggio de S. Antonio de Viena in Franza (1414);
3. Pace seguita fra il Marchese Nicolo e Filippo Maria Visconti Duca di Milano (13 Nov 1420);
4. Filippo Maria Visconti dona al March. Nicolo III Castellarano e altre terre del Reggiano (22 Jan 1421);
5. Il procuratore Nicolo III presta a Filippo Maria Visconti il giuramento di fedelta per la concessione di Reggio (8 Apr 1421);
6. L'imperatore Federico III con diploma dato a Novacivitate riduce di mille fiorini al Duca Borso il censo di 4000 fiorini d'oro da pagarsi nella festa dell'Ascensione (16 Aug 1452).

=== Volume 21 ===
Soranzo, Giovanni, ed. (1932). Johannis Simonetae: Rerum gestarum Francisci Sfortiae Mediolanensium ducis commentarii. Rerum italicarum scriptores. Vol. 21 Part 2 (Nuova ed.). Bologna: Nicola Zanichelli (published 1959).

Brizzolara, Giuseppe, ed. (1938). La cronaca di Cristoforo da Soldo. Rerum italicarum scriptores. Vol. 21 Part 3 (Nuova ed.). Bologna: Nicola Zanichelli (published 1942).

Mazzatinti, Giuseppe, ed. (1902). Cronaca di ser Guerriero da Gubbio (1350–1472). Rerum italicarum scriptores. Vol. 21 Part 4 (Nuova ed.). Città di Castello: S. Lapi (published 1942).

Appendices:

1. Extracts from Gesta Eugubinorum ab aedificatione civitatis usque ad a. 1300 scripta a philosophiae et medicinae doctore Greffolino Valeriani;
2. Cronica della città d'Ugubbio di fra Girolamo Maria da Venezia, from its origins to 17 December 1539;
3. Cronaca di Gubbio scritta da un canonico don Francesco (6 Mar 1419 – 18 April 1579).

Manfredi, Michele, ed. (1958). I diurnali del Duca di Monteleone. Rerum italicarum scriptores. Vol. 21 Part 5 (Nuova ed.). Bologna: Nicola Zanichelli. — Diurnali del duca di Monteleone

Paladino, Giuseppe, ed. (1934). Tristano Caracciolo: Opuscoli storici editi e inediti. Rerum italicarum scriptores. Vol. 22 Part 1 (Nuova ed.). Bologna: Nicola Zanichelli (published 1935). [No indexes.]

=== Volume 22 ===
- 22.2: Mazzatinti, Giuseppe, ed. (1903). Annales Forolivienses: ab origine urbis usque ad annum 1473. Rerum italicarum scriptores. Vol. 22 Part 2 (Nuova ed.). Città di Castello: S. Lapi.

Bonazzi, Giuliano, ed. (1904). Cronica gestorum in partibus Lombardie et reliquis Italie (1476–1482). Rerum italicarum scriptores. Vol. 22 Part 3 (Nuova ed.). Città di Castello: S. Lapi (published 1911).

[Published by MURATORI under the title: Diarium Parmense 1477 – 1482.]

Monticolo, Giovanni, ed. (1900). Marin Sanudo: Le vite dei dogi. Rerum italicarum scriptores. Vol. 22 Part 4 No.1 (Nuova ed.). Città di Castello: S. Lapi (published 1911).

=== Volume 23 ===
Pandiani, Emilio, ed. (1910). Antonii Galli: Commentarii de rebus Genuensium et de navigatione Columbi. Rerum italicarum scriptores. Vol. 23 Part 1 (Nuova ed.). Città di Castello: S. Lapi (published 1911).

With three short works:

1. Commentarius de Genuensium maritima classe in Barchinonenses expedita (1466);
2. Commentarli rerum genuensium (1476–1478);
3. De navigatione Columbi per inaccessum antea Oceanum commentariolum.

Sorbelli, Albano, ed. (1911). Cronica gestorum ac factorum memorabilium civitatis Bononie, edited by Bro. Hyeronimo de Bursellis (from its foundation to 1497); continued by Vincenzo Spargiati (1498–1584). Rerum italicarum scriptores. Vol. 23 Part 2 (Nuova ed.). Città di Castello: S. Lapi (published 1929).

[Published by Muratori under the title: Annales bononienses Fr. Hieronymi de Bursellis bononiensis Ordini Praedicatorum 1417 – 1497.]

Carusi, Enrico, ed. (1903). Il diario romano di Jacopo Gherardi da Volterra (7 Sep 1479 – 12 Aug 1484). Rerum italicarum scriptores. Vol. 23 Part 3a (Nuova ed.). Città di Castello: S. Lapi (published 1906).

Appendices:

1. Il diario concistoriale del cardinale Jacopo Ammanati-Piccolomini (1472–1479), attributed by Muratori to Giacomo Gherardi da Volterra;
2. New documents on the life of Jacopo Gherardi du Volterra.

Piccolomini, Paulo & Chiesa, Giuseppe, eds. (1910). Il diario romano di Sebastiano di Branca Tedallini (1485–1517); Il diario della città di Roma di Antonio de Vasco (1481–92). Rerum italicarum scriptores. Vol. 23 Part 3b (Nuova ed.). Città di Castello: S. Lapi (published 1911).

Mannucci, Francesco Luigi, ed. (1913). Antonij Hyvani Sarzanensis: Historia de Volaterrana calamitate. Rerum italicarum scriptores. Vol. 23 Part 4 (Nuova ed.). Città di Castello: S. Lapi.

Appendices (from the same author):

1. Gesta unius anni memorabilia (1478);
2. 'Moti genovesi e lunigianesi del 1463;
3. La battaglia della Molinella e il bellum tumultuarium in Lunigiana (1467);
4. La presa di Negroponte (1470);
5. De Genuensibus (et eorum revolutionibus).

Zimolo, Giulio C., ed. (1948). Leodrisii Cribelli: De expeditione Pii papae II adversus Turcos. Rerum italicarum scriptores. Vol. 23 Part 5 (Nuova ed.). Bologna: Nicola Zanichelli (published 1950).

=== Volume 24 ===
Bini, Arturo & Grazzini, Giovanni, eds. (1909). Annales Arretinorum maiores et minores [1192–1343]. Rerum italicarum scriptores. Vol. 24 Part 1 (Nuova ed.). Città di Castello: S. Lapi (published 1912). [Incomplete.]

Appendices:

1. Cronica dei Custodi (1100?);
2. Ricordo della compra di Arezzo by Guccio Benvenuti de' Nobili (Nov 1384);
3. Racconto della ribellione aretina del 1502 by Arcangelo Visdomini;
4. Diario del detto avvenimento by Francesco Pezzati, with some additions by Jacopo Burali;
5. Racconto della stessa ribellione tratto dalla "Storta di Arezzo„ by Bastiano;
6. Ricordi of Jacopo di Macario by Gregorio Catani (1515–1539);
7. Racconto della ribellione aretina del 1529 by Guasparrl Spadari.

Isolde, Francesco, ed. (1910). La mesticanza di Paulo di Lello Petrone. Rerum italicarum scriptores. Vol. 24 Part 2 (Nuova ed.). Città di Castello: S. Lapi (published 1912).

Appendices:

1. Il diario romano (1370–1410), attributed to Gentile Delfino;
2. Il diario e memorie delle cose accadute in Roma (1422–1482), by Paolo Dello Mastro.

Segre, Arturo, ed. (1912). I diarii di Girolamo Priuli (1494–1512), I.. Rerum italicarum scriptores. Vol. 24 Part 3 No.1 (Nuova ed.). Città di Castello: S. Lapi (published 1921).

[Partly published by Muratori (1494–1500) under the title: De bello gallico sive de rebus in Italia gestis a Carolo VIII et Ludovico XII Galliae regibus ab anno 1494 usque ad annuiti 1500, auctore Marino Sanuto Leonardi filio Commentarius italice scriptus.]

Cessi, Roberto, ed. (1933). I diarii di Girolamo Priuli (1499–1512), II.. Rerum italicarum scriptores. Vol. 24 Part 3 No.2 (Nuova ed.). Bologna: Nicola Zanichelli (published 1937).

Cessi, Roberto, ed. (1938). I diarii di Girolamo Priuli (1499–1512), IV.. Rerum italicarum scriptores. Vol. 24 Part 3 No.4 (Nuova ed.). Bologna: Nicola Zanichelli (published 1941).

Appendix: Dispacci di Provveditori Generali di Terraferma.

Cessi, Roberto, ed. (1912). Anonymus Valesianus: Fragmenta historica ab Henrico et Hadriano Valesio. Rerum italicarum scriptores. Vol. 24 Part 4 (Nuova ed.). Città di Castello: S. Lapi (published 1913).

[Republished by Muratori under the title: De Constantio Chloro, Constantino Magno, et aliis imperatoribus excerpta auctoris ignoti ab Henrico Valesio jam edita, cum notis Hadriani Valesii, historiographi regii ad communem commodum denuo nunc recusa.]

Isoldi, Francesco, ed. (1916). Il diario romano di Antonio di Pietro dello Schiavo (19 Oct 1404 – 25 Sep 1417)). Rerum italicarum scriptores. Vol. 24 Part 5 (Nuova ed.). Città di Castello: S. Lapi (published 1917).

[Published by Muratori under the title: Antonio Petri: Diarium romanum ab anno 1404 usque ad annum 1417.]

Morghen, Raffaello, ed. (1927). Chronicon Sublacense (593–1369). Rerum italicarum scriptores. Vol. 24 Part 6 (Nuova ed.). Bologna: Nicola Zanichelli.

Pardi, Giuseppe, ed. (1928). Autori incerti: Diario ferrarese (1409–1502). Rerum italicarum scriptores. Vol. 24 Part 7 (Nuova ed.). Bologna: Nicola Zanichelli (published 1933).

Appendix: Pardi, Giuseppe, ed. (1934). Bernardino Zambotte: Diario ferrarese (1476–1504). Rerum italicarum scriptores. Vol. 24 Part 7a (Nuova ed.). Bologna: Nicola Zanichelli (published 1937).

Pandiani, Emilio, ed. (1930). Bartholomaei Senaregae: De rebus Genuensibus commentaria (1488–1514). Rerum italicarum scriptores. Vol. 24 Part 8 (Nuova ed.). Bologna: Nicola Zanichelli (published 1932).

Begani, Orsini, ed. (1908). Antonio Nerli: Breve chronicon monasterii Mantuani sancti Andree ord. Bened. (800–1431). Rerum italicarum scriptores. Vol. 24 Part 13 (Nuova ed.). Città di Castello: S. Lapi (published 1910).

Appendix: Aliprandina, or Cronica de Mantua, (from its origin to 1414) by Bonamente Aliprandi

Tambara, Giovanni, ed. (1906). Juliani canonici: Civitatensis chronica (1252–1364). Rerum italicarum scriptores. Vol. 24 Part 14 (Nuova ed.). Città di Castello: S. Lapi.

[With the text of the Chronica summary taken from the Liber Anniversariorum in the Museo di Cividale.]

Segarizzi, Arnaldo, ed. (1902). Michaelis Savonarole : Libellus de magnificis ornamentis Regie Civitatis Padue. Rerum italicarum scriptores. Vol. 24 Part 15 (Nuova ed.). Città di Castello: S. Lapi.

=== Volume 25 ===
Miglierina, Bartolomeo & Castiglioni, Carlo, eds. (1938). Orationes in laudem Francisci, Blancae M., J. G. Sfortiae Vicecomitum. Rerum italicarum scriptores. Vol. 25 Part 2 (Nuova ed.). Bologna: Nicola Zanichelli.

=== Volume 26 ===
Scaramella, Gino, ed. (1906). Matthei Palmerii: Liber de Temporibus (1–1448). Rerum italicarum scriptores. Vol. 26 Part 1 (Nuova ed.). Città di Castello: S. Lapi (published 1915).

Appendix: Matthei Palmerii Annales (1429–1474), commonly known as Historia florentina.

Faloci-Pulignani, Michele, ed. (1932). Fragmenta Fulginatis historiae. Rerum italicarum scriptores. Vol. 26 Part 2 (Nuova ed.). Bologna: Nicola Zanichelli (published 1933).

1. Cronaca di Bonaventura di Benvenuto;
2. Memoriale di Pietruccio degli Unti.

=== Volume 27 ===
Volpi, Guglielmo, ed. (1907). Autore anonimo : Ricordi di Firenze (1459). Rerum italicarum scriptores. Vol. 27 Part 1 (Nuova ed.). Città di Castello: S. Lapi.

Appendix: Excerpt from an anonymous poem: Terze rime in lode di Cosimo de' Medici e de' figli e dell' honoranza fatta l'anno 1458 (sic) al figl.° del Duca di Milano ed al Papa nella loro venuta a Firenze.

Bellondi, Elina, ed. (1915). Cronica volgare di anonimo fiorentino: dall'anno 1385 al 1409, gia attribuita a Piero di Giovanni Minerbetti. Vol. 24 Part 2 (Nuova ed.). Città di Castello: S. Lapi (published 1919). [Incomplete – no indexes.]

Magherini Graziani, Giovanni, ed. (1922). Roberti Ursi: De obsidione Tiphernatum liber (1474). Rerum italicarum scriptores. Vol. 27 Part 3 (Nuova ed.). Bologna: Nicola Zanichelli. [Incomplete – only folios 1–3 in this copy – appendices 2–4 missing.] f.1–3

Appendices:

1. Letters from Giovanni Antonio Campano and Francesco Tiberti about the siege of Città di Castello;
2. Extracts from Cronaca di Benedetto Dei;
3. Remaining fragments of the poem Vitellidos di Giovanni Gallo Galli;
4. Book 9 of the poem Federici Montefeltri memorabilia gesta by Giovanni Antonio Pandoni known as il Porcellio.

=== Volume 28 ===
Rossini, Giuseppe, ed. (1936). Magistri Tolosani: Chronicon Faventinum (20 BC-1236). Rerum italicarum scriptores. Vol. 28 Part 1 (Nuova ed.). Bologna: Nicola Zanichelli (published 1939).

Torraca, Francesco, ed. (1902). Petri Cantinelli: Chronicon (1228–1306). Rerum italicarum scriptores. Vol. 28 Part 2 (Nuova ed.). Città di Castello: S. Lapi.

Messeri, Antonio, ed. (1907). Chronica breviora aliaque monumenta faventina a Bernardino Azzurrinio collecta, Vol. 1. Rerum italicarum scriptores. Vol. 28 Part 3 (Nuova ed.). Città di Castello: S. Lapi (published 1921).

Rossini, Giuseppe & Ballardini, Gaetano, eds. (1929). Statuta Faventiae. I. Statuta civitatis Faventiae. Rerum italicarum scriptores. Vol. 28 Part 5 No.1 (Nuova ed.). Bologna: Nicola Zanichelli (published 1930).

=== Volume 30 ===
Rodolico, Niccolò, ed. (1903). Cronaca fiorentina of Marchionne di Coppo Stefani. Rerum italicarum scriptores. Vol. 30 Part 1 (Nuova ed.). Bologna: Nicola Zanichelli (published 1955).

=== Volume 31 ===
Rota, Ettore, ed. (1904). Petri Ansolini de Ebulo: De rebus Siculis carmen. Vol. 31 Part 1 (Nuova ed.). Città di Castello: S. Lapi (published 1909).

=== Volume 32 ===
Celani, Enrico, ed. (1906). Johannis Burckardi: Liber notarum: ab anno 1483 usque ad annum 1506 (I). Vol. 32 Part 1 No.1 (Nuova ed.). Città di Castello: S. Lapi.

Celani, Enrico, ed. (1907). Johannis Burckardi: Liber notarum: ab anno 1483 usque ad annum 1506 (II). Vol. 32 Part 1 No.2a (Nuova ed.). Città di Castello: S. Lapi (published 1942).

=== Volume 33 ===
Sorbelli, Albano, ed. (1912). Cherubino Ghirardacci : Della historia di Bologna, Part III. Vol. 33 Part 1 (Nuova ed.). Città di Castello: S. Lapi (published 1932).

=== Volume 34 ===
Sicardi, Enrico, ed. (1917). Due cronache del Vespro in volgare siciliano del sec. XIII. Rerum italicarum scriptores. Vol. 34 Part 1 (Nuova ed.). Bologna: Nicola Zanichelli (published 1935).

Contents:

1. Lu Rebellamentu di Sichilia, lu quali hordinau e fichi fari messer Johanni di Prochita contra re Carlu, by an anonymous Messina author;
2. La Vinuta e lu suggiornu di lu re Japicu in la gitati di Catania, l'annu MCCLXXXVII, by Athanasiu di Jaci.

Appendices:

1. Liber Jani de Procita et Palialoco;
2. Leggenda di messer: John of Procida;
3 – 5. Chapters narrating the Sicilian Vespers in Brunetto Latini's Tesoro, Ricordano Malispini's Istoria fiorentina and in Giovanni Villani's Nuova Cronica;
6. Bull by Martin IV, against Peter of Aragon.

== Third Series ==
A new series is being published by the Istituto Storico Italiano per il Medio Evo (Italian Historical Institute for the Middle Ages):

- 1. Clareno, Angelo (1999). Rossini, O.; Helbling, H. (eds.). Opera. Historia septem tribulationum Ordinis minorum (critical ed.). Rome.
- 2. Compagni, Dino (2000). Cappi, D. (ed.). Cronica (critical ed.). Rome.
- 3. Martin, J.-M., ed. (2000). Chronicon Sanctae Sophiae (cod. Vat. Lat. 4939) with a study on the decorative ornamentation by Giulia Orofino. Rome.
- 4. Ferrariensis, Ricobaldus (2000). Hankey, A. T. (ed.). Compilatio chronologica. Rome.
- 5. Alexander monachus (2001). Pio, Berardo (ed.). Chronicorum liber monasterii sancti Bartholomei de Carpineto (critical ed.). Rome.
- 6. Manetti, Iannotius (2005). Modigliani, A. (ed.). De vita ac gestis Nicolai quinti summi pontificis, critical edition and translation. Rome. ISBN 88-89190-10-8.
- 7. Rizzi, A., ed. (2008). The 'Historia Imperiale' by Riccobaldo Ferrarese translated by Matteo Maria Boiardo (1471–1473). Rome.
- 8. Gallus, Antonius (2010). Fossati, Clara (ed.). Commentarius de Genuensium maritima classe in Barchinonenses expedita anno MCCCCLXVI. Rome. ISBN 978-88-89190-56-2.
- 9. Delle Donne, Fulvio, ed. (2011). Annales Cavenses. Rome. ISBN 978-88-89190-84-5.
- 10. Barbato, M., ed. (2012). Cronache volgari del Vespro (includes: Leggenda di Messer Gianni di Procida, preserved in the Biblioteca Estense in Modena, ms. it. 197; Cronaca del Vespro interpolata nel Tesoro volg., kept at the National Library in Florence, Magliabechiano VIII 1375; Liber Jani de Procita et Palioco, preserved in the Vatican Apostolic Library, Vat. Lat. 5256). Rome. ISBN 978-88-89190-91-3.
- 11. Pseudo Ugo Falcando (2015). D'Angelo, E. (ed.). De rebus circa Regni Siciliae curiam gestis – Epistola ad Petrum De desolatione Siciliae (critical ed.). Rome. ISBN 978-88-98079-21-6.
- 12. delle Donne, Fulvio, ed. (2017). Breve chronicon De Rebus Siculis. Rome. ISBN 978-88-98079-61-2.
- 13. Scalia, G.; Bartola, A., eds. (2017). Liber Maiorichinus de gestis Pisanorum illustribus. Translated by Guardo, M. Rome. ISBN 978-88-98079-67-4.
- 14. Berardi, Johannes (2017). Pratesi, Alessandro; Cherubini, Paolo (eds.). Liber instrumentorum seu chronicorum monasterii Casauriensis, seu Chronicon Casauriense. Vol. 1 (critical ed.). Rome. ISBN 978-88-98079-69-8., Vol. 2 (2018) ISBN 978-88-98079-77-3, Vol. 3 (2018) ISBN 978-88-98079-82-7 Vol. 4 (2019) ISBN 978-88-98079-88-9.
- 15. Mussato, Albertino (2018). Modonutti, R. (ed.). De gestis Italicorum post Henricum VII Cesarem (Libri I-VII). Rome. ISBN 978-88-98079-90-2.
