= Bonifacio da Morano =

Bonifacio da Morano (died 1349) was a notary and historian from Modena.

Bonifacio's family came from a place called Morano in the high Apennines. It is unclear if Bonifacio was born in Morano or in Modena. His father's name was Guizzardino. He was married twice (first to Bartolomea, then Betta) and had six children (Gherardo, Ilario, Rico, Bartolomea, Francesca and Filippa). The family house still stands on the Canal Chiaro.

Bonifacio wrote a chronicle in Latin entitled Chronica circularis. Although it has the form of a pope-and-emperor chronicle, it is essentially a local chronicle, especially for recent history. It covers the years 1188–1347. He relied on a now lost local history for the period before 1272. His main aim was to provide a chronology of podestàs of Modena, but his account is weighed down by reports on local weather and sermons. He took the side of the nobility against the popular party.

Bonifacio died in 1349, possibly a victim of the Black Death. His executor was the notary Giovanni da Bazzano, a coworker and personal friend who continued the Chronica down to 1363.

== Bibliography ==
- Arnaldi, Girolamo (1970). "Bonifacio da Morano". Dizionario Biografico degli Italiani (in Italian). Vol. 12: Bonfadini–Borrello. Rome: Institute of the Italian Encyclopaedia. ISBN 978-88-12-00032-6.
- Cochrane, Eric (1981). Historians and Historiography in the Italian Renaissance. University of Chicago Press.
- Musto, Ronald G. (2019). Writing Southern Italy Before the Renaissance: Trecento Historians of the Mezzogiorno. Routledge.
