= Sire Raul =

Italian historian

Sire Raul, also known as Ralph of Milan (Milan, ca. 1100 - approx. 1200), was an Italian historian.

He lived in Milan between the late 12th century and the beginning of the 13th century. He was probably an official in the service of the Podestà of Milan.

Remembered for his work as chronicler, Sire Raul is the author of the Annales Mediolanenses, an important chronicle about the clash between the Emperor Frederick I, Holy Roman Emperor and the Commune of Milan. He may have been present at the Battle of Carcano (9–10 August 1160), where local militias and the army of met on the field.

== Sources ==
This article originated as a translation of Sire Raul in the Italian Wikipedia.
