= James F. Boyce =

American industrial chemist (1868–1935)

James F Boyce
- Born: November 15, 1868; Chicago, Illinois, US
- Died: June 2, 1935 (aged 66); Saugatuck, Michigan
- Resting place: Gibson Cemetery, Allegan County, Michigan
- Occupation: Industrial chemist
- Employer: N. K. Fairbank
- Known for: Industrial hydrogenation procedure for consumable foods
- Spouse: Mable Hannah Thompson
- Parent(s): Joseph Boyce and Mary Barry

James F. Boyce (November 15, 1868 – June 2, 1935) was an American chemist who worked for the N.K. Fairbank Company of Chicago, a manufacturer of lard, cooking oils, soaps, and detergents. He helped create new washing products such as Gold Dust washing powder. Boyce pioneered techniques that are now used in the isolation and removal of consumable hydrogenated vegetable oils from plants (especially cottonseed). Later in life, he ran the Chicago Glass Novelty Company.

== Family ==
Boyce was born in Chicago, Illinois to Scot immigrant, Joseph, a Presbyterian railroad engineer, and Irish immigrant, Mary (née Barry) Boyce, who met and married in New York City before moving to Chicago.

Boyce's successful work as a commercial chemist allowed him to move to Hyde Park Township—at the time an exclusive suburb of Chicago. He married Mable Hannah Thompson (whose parents owned a summer estate, 'Kemah', located in Saugatuck, Michigan), on June 22, 1899. They had nine children. Early in the twentieth century the family relocated to a working fruit farm near Saugatuck.

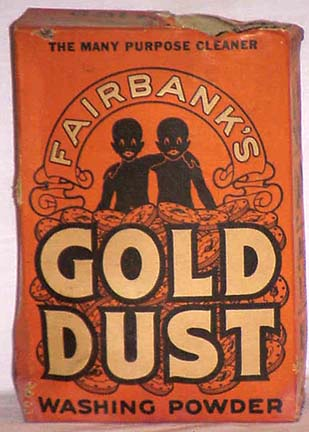
Gold Dust Washing Soap box

== Early life and career ==
About 1888 Boyce began working as a chemist for the industrialist, Nathaniel Kellogg Fairbank, whose company manufactured animal and plant fat-based products such as an eponymous brand of lard, Fairy Soap, and Sunny Monday Washday Soap, to name just a few. He quickly rose to the rank of foreman at the N.K. Fairbank Company of Chicago.

=== Gold Dust ===
Boyce had his first career success as the supervising chemist in the formulation of Gold Dust Washing Powder, an all purpose cleaning agent first introduced in 1889. Initially a regional success, the brand quickly rose to national prominence. The product's mascots, the iconic Gold Dust Twins, were featured in print, written, and (eventually) radio ads. The twins, "Goldie" and "Dustie," made an easily recognizable trademark found in most U.S. homes during the first half of the twentieth century, even spawning a radio program, the Gold Dust Twins Radio Show, in 1929. From 1896, Gold Dust was distributed nationally in the U.S. and Canada by the Lever Brothers Company.

=== Cottolene ===
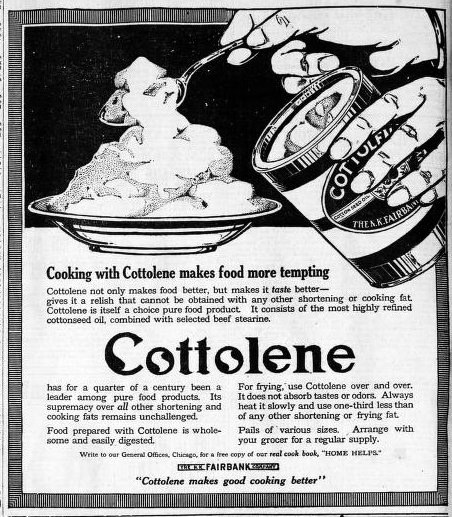
Cottolene ad, 1915

Boyce made his most notable discovery while working with cottonseed waste products. In an attempt to extract usable oils for the food industry in the 1890s, he focused on cottonseed oil, which was then of no practical use as a food supplement or additive for human consumption. Although never patented by his employer, Fairbank, he developed a novel industrial hydrogenation process (using nickel as a catalyst) that proved successful for use in food products and was considered a scientific breakthrough.

Incorporating these advances into the limited cooking oils market at the time resulted in the Fairbank Company's creation of Cottolene, a product containing 90% vegetable fat and 10% beef suet. This quickly became a popular culinary replacement for lard, a substance that had been used in kitchens for centuries, but was known to be unhealthy. Cottolene dominated the vegetable cooking oil market until competitor Procter & Gamble unveiled Crisco in the early-20th-century. Packaged similarly—and also promoted with accompanying cookbooks just as the marketing for Cottolene had done—Crisco was composed entirely of vegetable oils, and became the preferred brand found in many kitchens of the day.

== Later life and legacy ==
Boyce's nickel-catalyst hydrogenation procedure allowed its application (by the likes of French chemist and Nobel laureate, Paul Sabatier, and the manufacturing giant Procter & Gamble) in the commercial exploitation of vegetable oils and fats. This led to the creation of such products as today's "oleomargarine" and vegetable shortening.

Boyce retired from the N. K. Fairbank labs and took up growing fruit at Kemah, with hired hands doing most of the physical labor in the orchards. Around 1915 he assumed the position of president of the Chicago Glass Novelty Company, headquartered in Marion, Indiana. He held this post until his death.

== Death ==
Boyce died on June 2, 1935. He is buried in the Gibson Cemetery, in Laketown Township, Allegan County, outside Holland, Michigan.
