= Pithou =

Pithou is a surname. Notable people with the surname include:

- François Pithou (1543–1621), French lawyer and author
- Jean Pithou (1524–1602), French lawyer and author
- Nicolas Pithou (1524–1598), French lawyer and author
- Pierre Pithou (also Petrus Pithoeus) (1539–1596), French lawyer and scholar

- These four were brothers
