= The Gold Dust Twins (radio show) =

1920s U.S. radio program

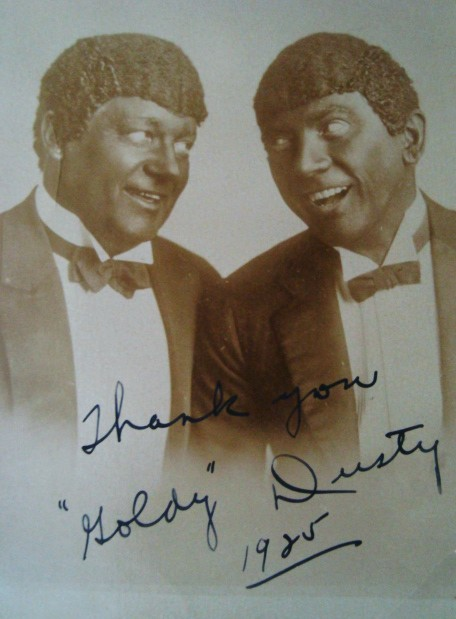
- Comedians Hindemeyer and Tuckerman as Goldy and Dusty
- Country of origin: U.S.
- Starring: Harvey Hindemeyer; Earle Tuckerman
- Original release: March 15th, 1921 – July 21st, 1943
- Audio format: Analog
- Opening theme: The Gold Dust jingle
- Sponsored by: Gold Dust washing products and Lever Brothers

The Gold Dust Twins radio hour was on the air in 1921. Broadcast and syndicated nationally, the program starred Harvey Hindemeyer as "Goldie", and Earle Tuckerman as "Dusty." It was one of the earliest examples of media–product tie-ins

== Background ==
The Gold Dust Twins were conceived early-on as the trademarked icons for Fairbanks' Gold Dust washing powder products. The original Gold Dust Twin caricatures were often depicted doing household chores together. They appeared in printed media as early as 1892, and adorned the packages of the several lines of washing products developed and marketed by N.K. Fairbanks, a Chicago soap and food additive company. The use of the "Goldie" and "Dusty" product mascots in a 1903 national advertising campaign (Note: The "Goldie" and "Dusty" product mascots were drawn by E.W. Kemble, a political cartoonist for a Chicago newspaper.) that featured a booth with two live actors depicting the characters at the 1904 St. Louis World's Fair, was hugely successful for the popularity of the Twins, and for the company, whose soap products became national staples in the United States during the early to mid twentieth-century.

== The program ==
The Gold Dust Twins radio show of the decade of the 1920s was an innovative marketing tool for the Gold Dust product line. The program was sponsored by Lever Brothers and Gold Dust washing powder. The program featured comedians Harvey Hindemeyer (as "Goldie"), and Earle Tuckerman (as "Dusty"), who performed their comedic skits in blackface, depicting somewhat minstrel-like caricatures of two bumbling black men.

An early example of product tie-ins, Gold Dust's advertising jingle became the show's theme song, and was sung by Hindemeyer and Tuckerman. The two actors embodied the characters of the Gold Dust Twin icons found in the advertising for the Fairbanks' soap line.

== See also ==
- Rafferty and the Gold Dust Twins 1975 Comedy-drama film
