= François Pithou =

French lawyer and author

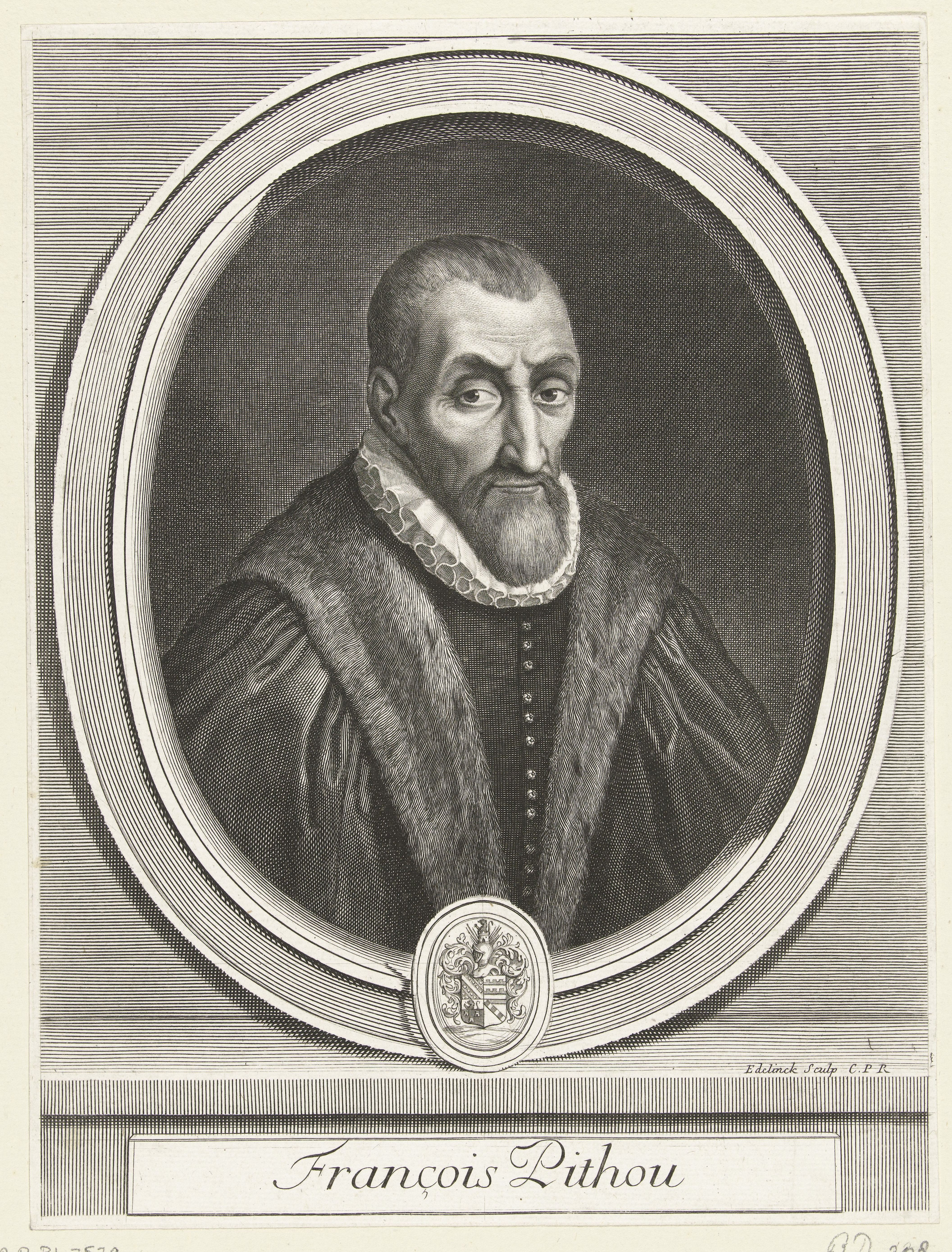
François Pithou

François Pithou (1543 – 25 January 1621) was a French lawyer and author.

He was a younger brother of Pierre Pithou and the twins Jean and Nicolas Pithou. His works are Glossarium ad libros capitularium (1588) and Traité de l'excommunication et de l'interdit, etc. (1587).

== Biography ==
A renowned lawyer, he maintained very close ties with his brother Pierre, with whom he collaborated in writing books and expanding the family library.

He was one of the most learned men of his time, who made great discoveries in jurisprudence and literature. We owe him the Fables of Phaedrus (fabulist), which were unknown and had remained in manuscript form in libraries since the time of Augustus. He sent the manuscript to his brother Pierre, and after reviewing it together, they immediately sent the first Editio princeps in 1596. Phaedrus' Fables can be considered a work of the purest Latin.

He spent his entire life reviving ancient authors, either by correcting them or illustrating them with scholarly notes. In his day, no one had a more accurate knowledge of the history of France and all of Europe, as well as the customs and traditions of all the peoples who comprise it.

Henry IV of France appointed him Attorney General of the Chamber of Justice against businessmen, where he demonstrated his abilities and firmness. The king also chose him to attend the conference at Fontainebleau in 1600 between Jacques Davy Duperron and Philippe de Mornay on the book that the latter had written against the Mass. He was a member of the commission responsible for settling the borders between France and the Spanish Netherlands.

He was busy printing Fragments of the History of Saint Hilary, Bishop of Poitiers, when he fell ill and died.

After the death of his brothers, he lived until his death in the family home in Troyes. In his will, he bequeathed his house, numerous possessions, and part of his library to the city of Troyes to be used as a college, the “Collegium Pithoe-Tricassinum.”

He was bound by a close friendship to Antoine Loysel, Jacques Auguste de Thou, Claude Dupuy (jurist), and Nicolas Le Fèvre.

== Bibliography ==
- http://gso.gbv.de/DB=1.28/REL?PPN=004739280&RELTYPE=TT
