= Étienne Aufréri =

French legal scholar

Étienne Aufréri (Stephanus Auffrerius) (1458 – 11 September 1511) was a French legal scholar, whom Pierre de Leon, Archbishop of Toulouse, (Note: Pierre Petrus de Lion, archbishop of Toulouse ( † 1491 ) , abbot , archbishop - Toulouse ( France ) - Chevalier F. 303 , 379, Biographical Index of the Middle Ages, 2011) appointed to an office in the archiepiscopal court in 1483.

Arriving in Toulouse at a very young age, Étienne Aufréri became an official advisor in 1481, then an official of the Archbishop of Toulouse. In 1486, he was appointed professor of canon law at the University of Toulouse. Aufréri mentions, in his Decisions of the Chapel of Toulouse, that Pierre de Leon, Archbishop of Toulouse, appointed him as an official in the archiepiscopal court, in 1483.

In the edition of the Stilus supremæ curiæ Parlamenti Parisiensis atque Tolosani, published at Paris in 1530, he is spoken of as the distinguished Étienne Aufréri, an eminent professor of civil and canon law, and during his lifetime president of the inquest in the Parliament of Toulouse."

A form of citation issued by the Parlement of Toulouse in 1497 begins "Estienne, le premier arrêtiste toulousain" Aufréri is considered the first Toulouse arrêtist: to him can be attributed the “Traité des arrêts”, commenting on the judgments of the Toulouse parliament from 1444 to 1472, published in 1542 by Celse-Hugues Descousu. (Note: fr:Arrêt de règlement In Old French law, a ruling is a solemn decision, taken by a sovereign court (in particular the Parliaments), which is of general scope and which is binding on lower courts in the future. The rulings are presented in numbered articles like laws, or even like real codes. The rulings refer to a common practice until 1789, by which the Parliaments of the Ancien Régime rendered a solemn decision of general scope, abstract and which was binding on lower courts. These rulings were valid for the future and with respect to all, just like the law. Violating by their very nature the principle of the separation of powers, these rulings were subsequently prohibited by the drafters of the Civil Code in Article 5 which states that "judges are prohibited from ruling by way of general and regulatory provision on the cases submitted to them".)

His most widely distributed work is the annotated edition of the Decisiones Capellæ Tholosanæ (Decisions of the Chapel of Toulouse).
