= Rana rupta et bos =

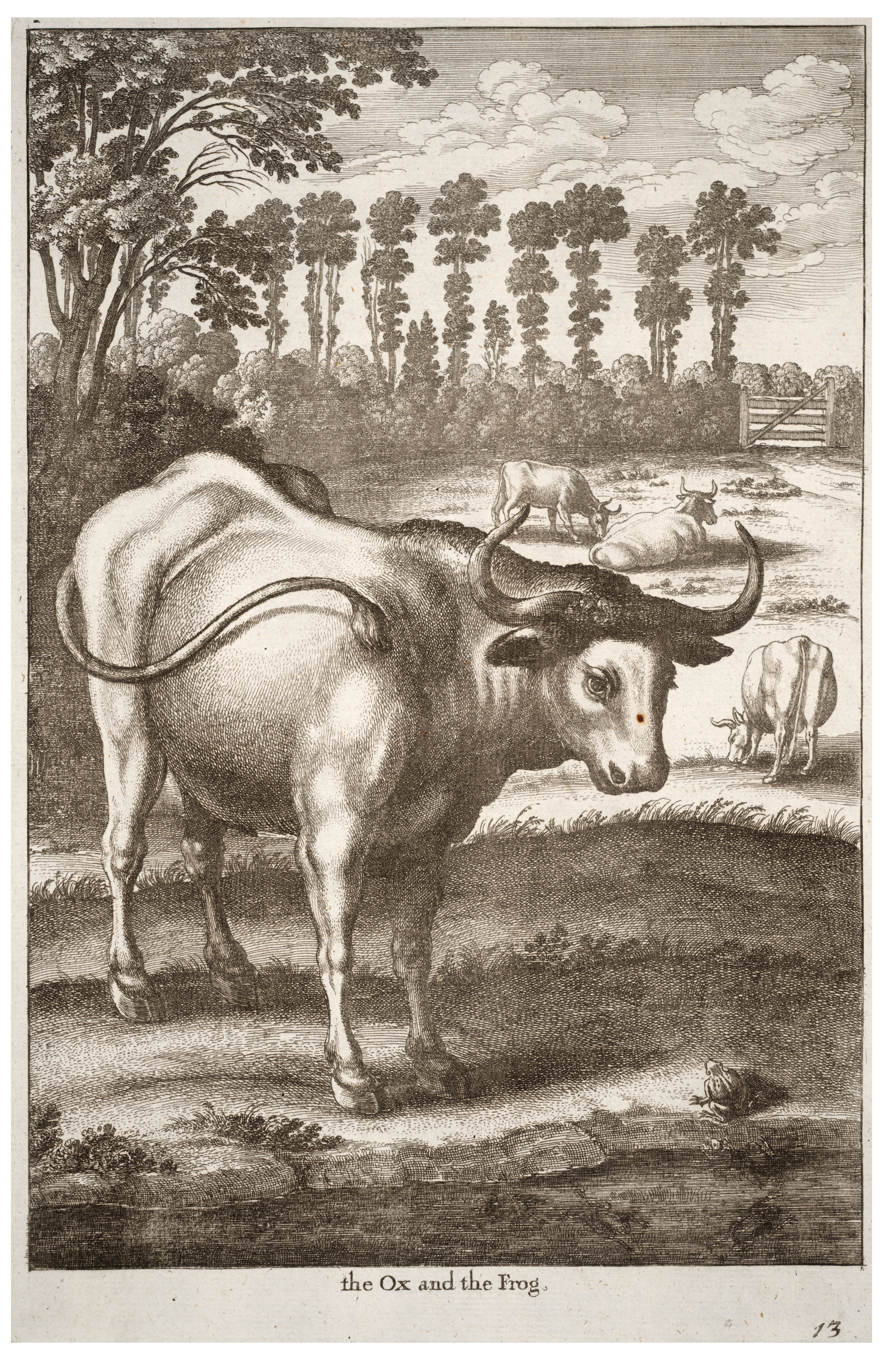
The Ox and the Frog, Wenceslaus Hollar, 17th century

Rana rupta et bos (The Frog that exploded, and the ox) is a Latin retelling from the Liber primus of the Fabulae (1:24) of the Roman poet Phaedrus (1st century); the Latin text is itself based on The Frog and the Ox, one of Aesop's Fables.

== The Fable ==
Latin original

Rana rupta et bos

Inops, potentem dum vult imitari, perit.

In prato quondam rana conspexit bovem,
et tacta invidia tantae magnitudinis
rugosam inflavit pellem. Tum natos suos
interrogavit an bove esset latior.

Illi negarunt. Rursus intendit cutem
maiore nisu, et simili quaesivit modo,
quis maior esset. Illi dixerunt ‘bovem’.

Novissime indignata, dum vult validius
inflare sese, rupto iacuit corpore.

Poetic free translation
by Henry Thomas Riley

The Proud Frog

When poor men to expenses run,
And ape their betters, they’re undone.
An Ox the Frog a-grazing view’d,
And envying his magnitude,
She puffs her wrinkled skin, and tries
To vie with his enormous size:
Then asks her young to own at least
That she was bigger than the beast.
They answer, No. With might and main
She swells and strains, and swells again.
“Now for it, who has got the day?”
The Ox is larger still, they say.
At length, with more and more ado,
She raged and puffed, and burst in two.

Literal translation
by Christopher Smart

The needy man, while affecting to imitate
the powerful, comes to ruin.

Once on a time, a Frog espied an Ox
in a meadow, and moved with envy at
his vast bulk, puffed out her wrinkled skin,
and then asked her young ones whether she
was bigger than the Ox. They said: “No.”

Again, with still greater efforts, she distended
her skin, and in like manner enquired
which was the bigger. They said: “The Ox.”

At last — while, full of indignation, she tried,
with all her might, to puff herself out —
she burst her body on the spot.

Interpretation

The fable teaches that one should
not pretend to be something
that he is not in reality.

It appeals to us to be satisfied
with what we have
and not to yield to envy or to covet
what others have more of.

Though the fable addresses
a concern over lack of bodily size,
it can readily be extended to a concern
over lack of wealth or power.
Maxims like “puffed up like a frog”,
“inflated sense of self-importance” or
“bursting with envy” derive from this fable.
