= Legal history of France =

The legal history of France is commonly divided into three periods: that of the old French law (Ancien Droit), that of the Revolutionary or intermediary law (Droit révolutionnaire ou intermédiaire), and that of the Napoleonic law or Droit nouveau ('New law').

== Revolutionary law ==
"The legislative work of the French Revolution has been qualified as intermediary law since it formed the transition between the old French law and the new, the law covered by the Napoleonic codes." "The private law of the French Revolution is to-day no longer considered an intermediary law. Yet from a positivist point of view, most of the provisions enacted in this area between 1788 to 1799 were of short duration." Feudalism was abolished on the night of 4 August 1789. The Declaration of the Rights of Man and of the Citizen was adopted on the 26 August.

Early in 1791 freedom of defense became the standard; any citizen was allowed to defend another. From the beginning, the authorities were concerned about this experiment without future. Derasse suggests it was a "collective suicide" by the lawyers in the Assembly, but cannot be used for justifying aggression or taking revenge. In criminal cases, the expansion of the right ... gave priority to the spoken word. Former "advocates" lost their title, their distinctive form of dress, their status, and their professional orders and adapted their practices to the new political and legal situation. The Penal Code is dated 25 September.

On 9 May, the Assembly discussed the right to petition. The next day a decree passed banning all petitions bearing "collective signatures". Article III specifically recognised the right of active citizens to meet together to draw up petitions and addresses and present them to municipal authorities.

== Napoleonic law ==
Napoleonic law is still considered "the foundation stone of the French legal system."

=== Aftermath of the First French Empire ===
The judicial system of post-Napoleonic France was an intricate system of relations between the government and the police/judicial force. Together they helped to minimize crime while successfully fulfilling the guarantees made in the Declaration of the Rights of Man and of the Citizen written in 1789. Crime in post-Napoleonic France was seen as an act of high treason, which explains the harsh punishment. In Victor Hugo's 1862 novel Les Misérables, Jean Valjean receives a sentence of five years hard work in the galleys for the small crime of stealing a loaf of bread to feed his sister's children. This points out the injustice of the system. While providing a deterrent for crime, hardship cases such as Jean Valjean's and Fantine's fall through the cracks of society when they deserved special attention because of the situations that caused the crime.

== See also ==
- Judiciary of France
- Law of France
