= 75A-4 and KWS-1 =

Set of amateur radio receiver and transmitter

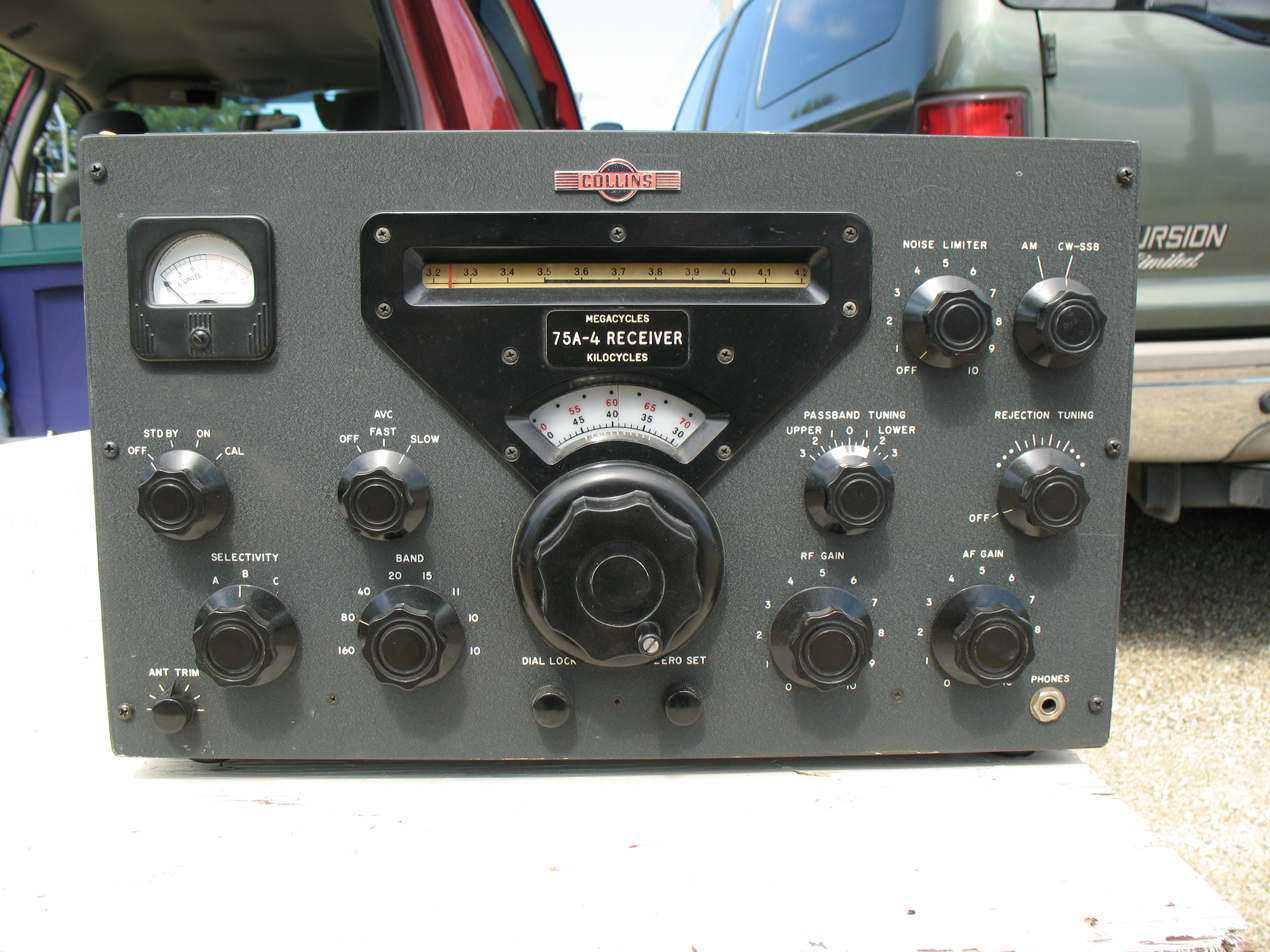
The Collins 75A-4 amateur radio receiver

The 74A4 and KWS-1 is an amateur radio receiver and transmitter pair made by the Collins Radio Company of Cedar Rapids, Iowa that were introduced in 1955. They were designed to operate using the then new single-sideband (SSB) voice modulation as well as CW and AM modes. They were influential in popularizing SSB.

== Debut ==
The KWS-1 transmitter along with the 75A-4 receiver, together, cost over $2500 when new (equivalent to over $20,000 in 2012 dollars). Collins products at the time were considered 'top of the line'. Ham radio enthusiasts nicknamed the pair the "Gold Dust Twins", since they were unaffordable for most amateur radio enthusiasts when first introduced.

Both radios used vacuum tubes and employed Collins innovations including mechanical filters and permeability tuned oscillators. (Note: A permeability tuned oscillator (PTO) alters the resonant frequency of a circuit by moving a sintered powder core in and out of the tuning coil using a lead screw.) The KWS-1 final amplifier use a pair of 4X150 power tubes and operated at a power input of one kilowatt, the maximum allowed under Federal Communications Commission (FCC) regulations at the time. The transmitter appearance matched the receiver, but its high voltage power supply was packaged in a separate pedestal.

== Persistent favor ==
In a 2006 review of the half-century-old 75A-4 Stu Cohen wrote "Performance under all but extremely crowded band conditions is still excellent, and a 75A-4 will hold its own against almost any receiver. Under less crowded band conditions, the performance is superb."
