= The Horse that Lost its Liberty =

Fable by Aesop

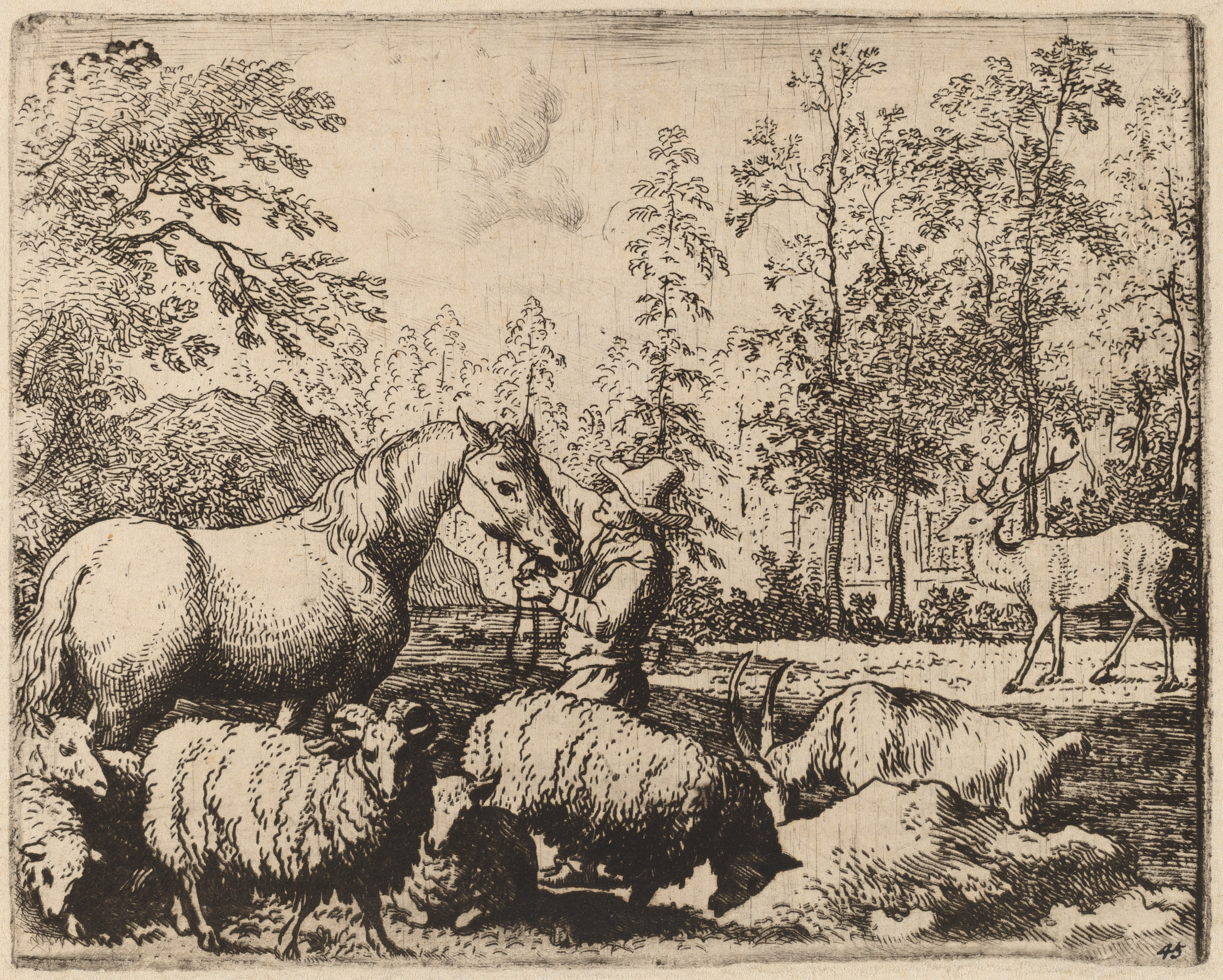
Allaert van Everdingen's etching of the horse submitting to the bridle, National Gallery of Art, Washington DC

The fable of how the horse lost its liberty in the course of settling a petty conflict exists in two versions involving either a stag or a boar and is numbered 269 in the Perry Index. When the story is told in a political context, it warns against seeking a remedy that leaves one worse off than before. Where economic circumstances are involved, it teaches that independence is always better than compromised plenty.

== The horse, the hunter and the stag ==
A horse disputes ownership of a meadow with a stag but cannot drive it off by force. It therefore calls in the aid of a man, who bridles the horse and rides on its back. But then, seeing how useful the horse is to him, he refuses to unbridle it afterwards. The story is related as an example of telling a fable in Aristotle's work on rhetoric and is there ascribed to the poet Stesichorus. The fable was also told by the Roman poet Horace, widening its significance as an example of how one should be content with little rather than losing personal liberty in quest of more.

William Caxton included the story in his collection of The Fables of Aesop (1484) under the title "Of the hors, of the hunter and of the hert" as teaching the moral given by Aristotle that None ought to put hym self in subiection for to auenge hym on other. Samuel Croxall cites Horace's conclusion that one should never yield one's liberty to another for reasons of avarice. The fable was told as "The horse seeking vengeance on the stag (Le cheval s'étant voulu venger du cerf) in La Fontaine's Fables and ends on the reflection that without personal liberty all other purchases are valueless:

(C'est l'acheter trop cher, que l'acheter d'un bien
Sans qui les autres ne sont rien).

== The horse and the boar ==
The alternative version of the fable concerns a boar that muddies the horse's watering hole or else flattens his pasture. Seeking vengeance, the horse requests a man to hunt down the boar. In the end the man reflects that he has not only gained a prey but a slave as well. This was related by Phaedrus and concludes that those with quick tempers ought not to put themselves in the power of another. The story would be appreciated by Phaedrus who, like Aesop too, was once a slave himself. Roger L'Estrange told both the boar version and the stag version as illustrating the need to be careful that the remedy is not worse than the original offence.

There is a possible West Asian source for the story of losing one's independence in quest of a better life, which was the context of Horace's interpretation. This is in a fragmentary proverbial saying in the 6th century BCE Aramaic version of the story of Ahiqar in which an onager (wild ass) stoutly rejects the suggestion that it should be bridled. "A man one day said to the onager, Let me ride upon thee, and I will maintain thee. Said the wild ass, Keep thy maintenance and thy fodder and let me not see thy riding."
