= N. K. Fairbank =

American businessman (1829–1903)

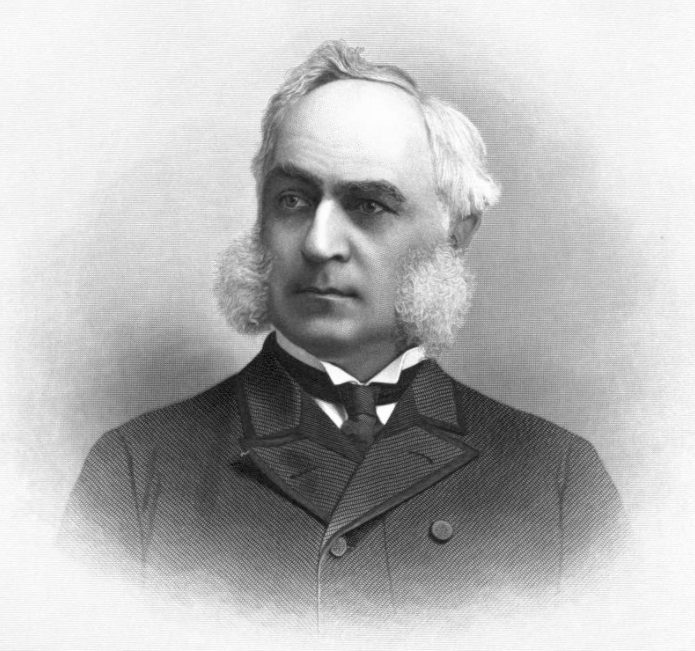
- Born: Nathaniel Kellogg Fairbank; 1829; Sodus, New York
- Died: March 27, 1903 (aged 73–74); Chicago, Illinois
- Burial place: Graceland Cemetery
- Occupation: Businessman
- Spouse: Helen Livingston Graham (m. 1866; died 1895)

Nathaniel Kellogg "N.K." Fairbank (1829–1903) was a Chicago industrialist whose company, the N.K. Fairbank Co., manufactured soap as well as animal and baking products in conjunction with the major meat packing houses of northern Illinois. The company had factories in Chicago, St. Louis, Montreal and Louisiana and had international offices in the United Kingdom and Germany. Gold Dust Washing Powder (featuring the Gold Dust Twins and distributed by Lever Brothers), was one of the most successful cleansing product lines in twentieth century North America. Another original Fairbank creation, Fairy Soap, was purchased by Procter & Gamble and remains one of the best-known European household brands.

== Early life and family ==
N. K. Fairbank was born in Sodus, New York in 1829. He was a descendant of Jonathan Fairbanks of England, who arrived in Massachusetts in 1633, and built Fairbanks House in Dedham.

== Streeterville ==
Fairbank was the original owner of the land that currently comprises Streeterville in downtown Chicago; now some of the most expensive real estate in the city. Despite unanimously winning several court cases, Fairbank, along with the Pinkertons and the Chicago Police, were unable – for 28 years – to remove the squatter and Chicago legend George Streeter, from the property. As a testament to the long-running feud, a street running near the outside (western) edge of Streeterville is named Fairbanks Court.

== Other activities ==
Fairbank served as: president of the University of Chicago board of trustees, a founder and president of The Chicago Club, a founder of the Commercial Club of Chicago, a senior officer and an early major trader at the Chicago Board of Trade, one of the original trustees of the Chicago Symphony Orchestra, the first Commodore of the Lake Geneva Yacht Club, and as a director of numerous corporations between 1880 and 1903. He was also a member of the famous Jekyll Island Club (aka The Millionaires Club) on Jekyll Island, Georgia.

Fairbank, Arizona, now a ghost town, was named for him because of his role in financing both the Grand Central Mining Company and the railroad in nearby Tombstone, Arizona.

== The Livingstons ==
Fairbank married Helen Livingston Graham in New York on April 24, 1866, and they had seven children. Livingston Graham's original American ancestor was Robert Livingston, 1st Lord of Livingston Manor. She died in 1895.

N. K. Fairbank died at his home in Chicago on March 27, 1903, and was buried at Graceland Cemetery.

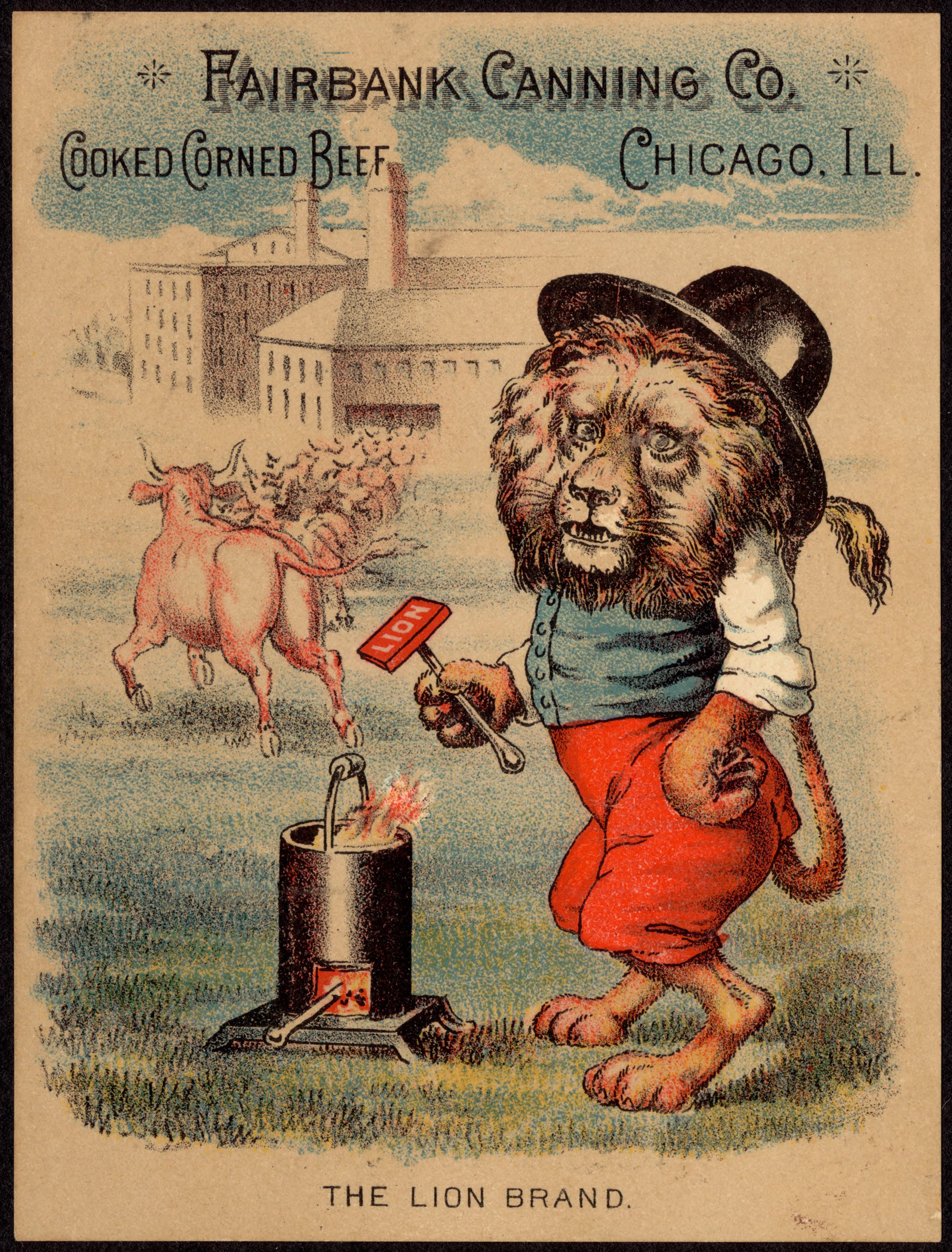
Fairbank Canning Co., cooked corned beef, Chicago, Ill. The Lion brand., ca. 1870-1900; from the 19th Century American Trade Cards collection of the Boston Public Library

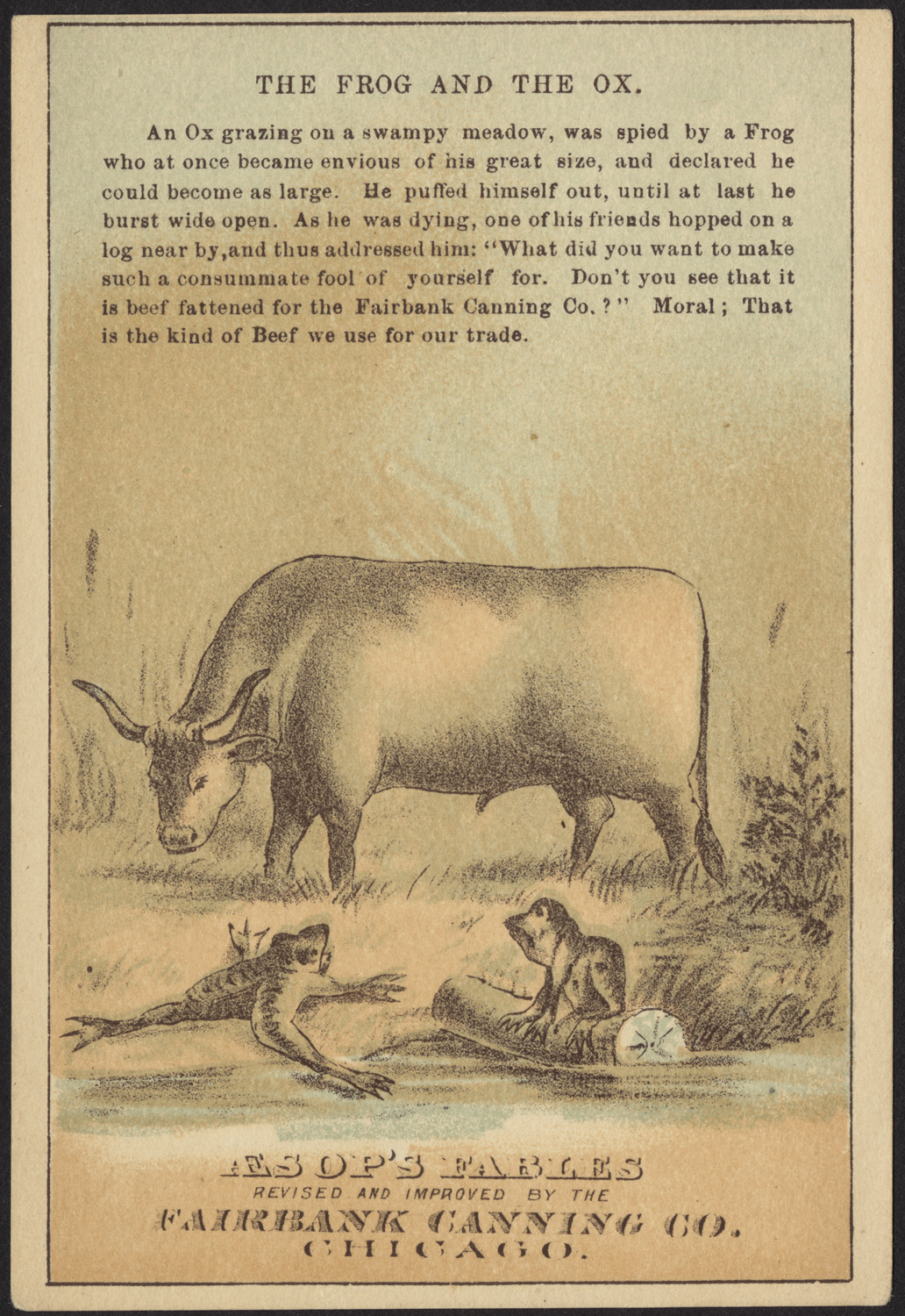
Trade card for the Fairbank Canning Co, featuring an interpretation of Aesop's fable of The Frog and the Ox

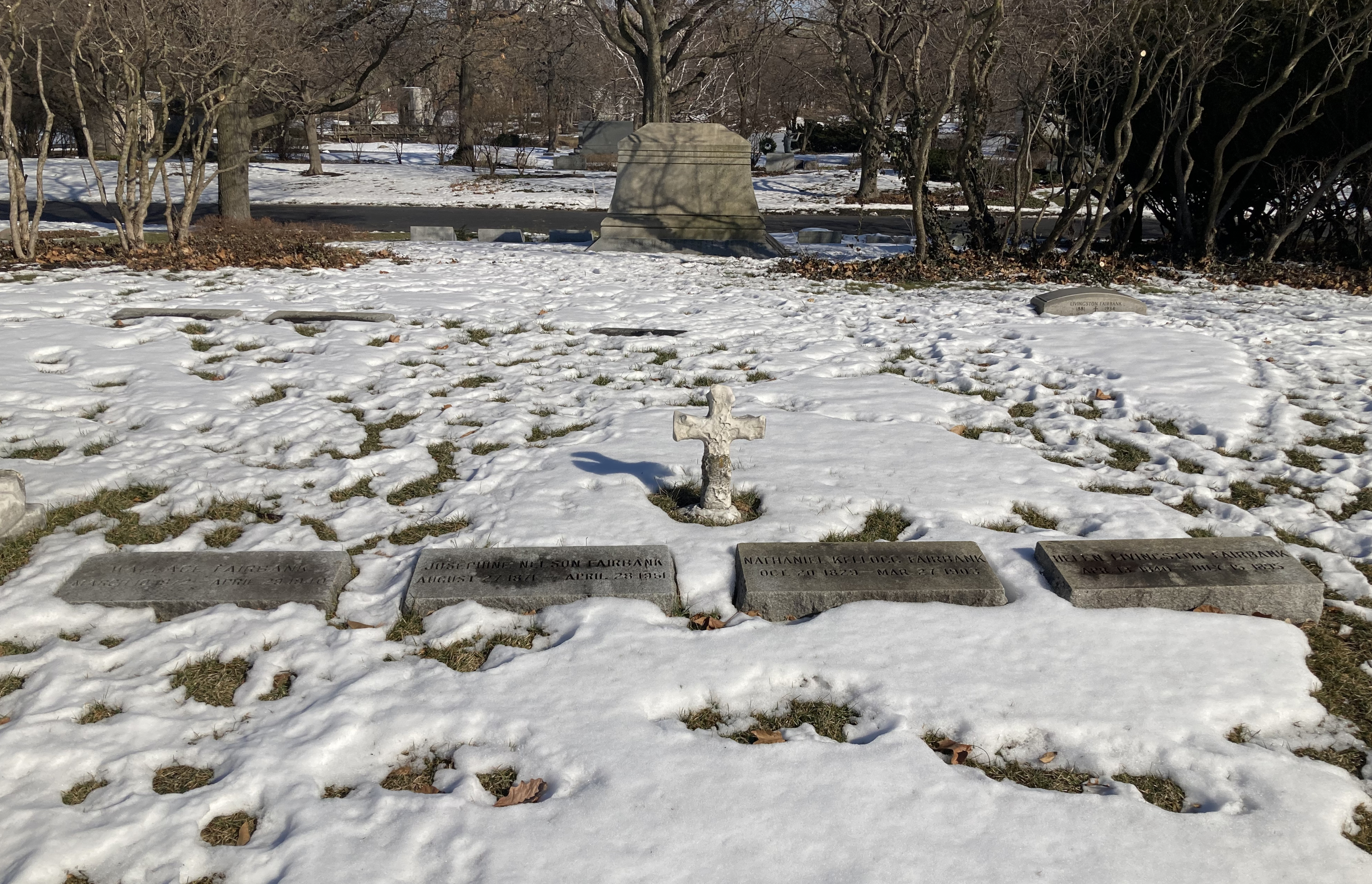
Fairbank's grave at Graceland Cemetery
