= Landolfus Sagax =

Langobard historian

Landolfus Sagax or Landolfo Sagace (sagax meaning "expert" or "scholar") was a Langobard historian who wrote a Historia Romana in the Beneventan Duchy (last quarter of the tenth century or beginning of the eleventh).

When his Historia was first published by Pierre Pithou in Basel in 1569, due to its varied content and sources, Pithou gave it the title Historia Miscella. The manuscript from the Palatine Library at Heidelberg (Pal. lat. 909) preserved in the Vatican Library is written in Beneventan script and shows evidence of having been committed to parchment under the supervision of Landulf himself.

The Historia, an expansion and extension of Paul the Deacon's eighth-century Historia Romana, contains a list of Byzantine emperors until the then-living Basil II and Constantine VIII (d. 1028) and another of empresses from Fausta to the wife of Michael IV.

There are exhortations to a princeps, perhaps implying that it was written at court, but which court is disputed. Some scholars, like Traube, have favoured Naples and others, like Amedeo Crivellucci, Benevento, where a prince was then reigning. Surviving manuscripts are littered with marginal notes, many of Landulf's authorship.

== Sources ==
- Chiesa, Paolo (2004). "LANDOLFO Sagace". Dizionario Biografico degli Italiani (in Italian). Vol. 63: Labroca–Laterza. Rome: Institute of the Italian Encyclopaedia. ISBN 978-88-12-00032-6.
