= Lex convivalis =

Latin text from late antiquity

The Lex convivalis, also known as the Decretum parasiticum, is a humorous Latin text from late antiquity.

Only a fragment of this work survives, transmitted at the end of the Querolus. Some editors include it in the text of that work, either at the end, as transmitted, or transposed to an earlier point in the last scene. The difference between the metrical character of the two works is against this: the Lex convivalis has metrical clausulae typical of late Latin prose rhythm, while the Querolus has endings that resemble Plautine verse. The text sets out the rights of a parasite (a hanger-on) for injuries sustained at a feast, humorously phrased in the formal language of Roman laws.
