= Nicolas Rigault =

French classical scholar

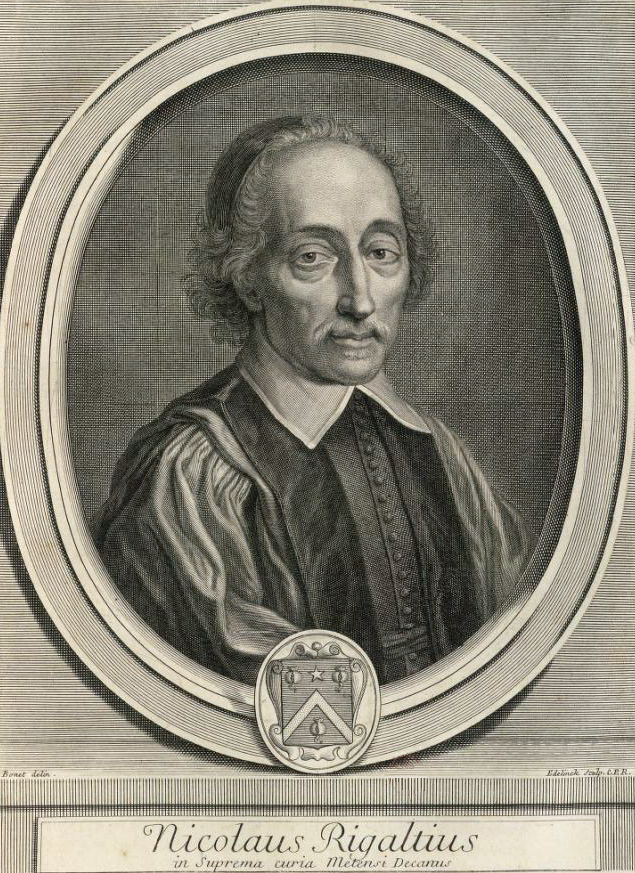
Nicolas Rigault

Nicolas Rigault (Rigaltius; 1577-1654) was a French classical scholar.

Born in Paris, he was educated by the Jesuits. He was successively councillor of the parlement of Metz, procurator general at Nancy, and intendant of the province of Toul.

He prepared annotated editions of Phaedrus, Martial, Juvenal, Tertullian, Minucius Felix, Saint Cyprian, and also some mixed collections: Rei accipitrariæ scriptores, 1612; Rei agrariae scriptores, 1613.

He acted as librarian to Louis XIII. He used a pseudonym J. B. Aeduus.

== Selected works ==
- 1596

— «Asini aurei asinus, sive De scaturigine onocrenes» (1596; экземпляр парижской национальной библиотеки считается uniсum),
— «Satyra Menippea somnium»,

- 1600 — «Biberii Curculionis parasiti mortualia, accessit Asinus...» (более известная под заглавием III изд.: "Funus parasiticum" (П., 1601), "Rei agrariae scriptores" (1613)).

== Sources ==
- Nicolas Rigault, in Marie-Nicolas Bouillet et Alexis Chassang (eds), Dictionnaire universel d'histoire et de géographie, 1878
