= Phaedrus (fabulist) =

Latin fabulist (c. 15 BC – c. 50 AD)

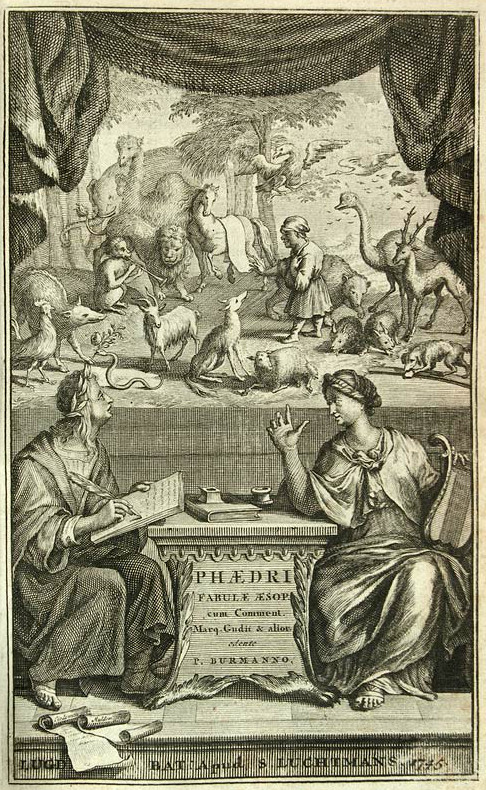
Phaedrus, 1745 engraving

Gaius Julius Phaedrus (/ˈfiːdrəs/; Ancient Greek: Φαῖδρος; Phaîdros) or Phaeder (c. 15 BC – c. 50 AD) was a 1st-century AD Roman fabulist and the first versifier of a collection of Aesop's Fables into Latin. Nothing is recorded of his life except for what can be inferred from his poems, and there was little mention of his work during late antiquity. It was not until the discovery of a few imperfect manuscripts during and following the Renaissance that his importance emerged, both as an author and in the transmission of the fables.

== Biography ==
The poet describes himself as born in the Pierian Mountains, perhaps in Pydna, and names the Thracian musicians Linus and Orpheus as his countrymen. The inscriptions and subscriptions in the manuscript tradition identify him as a freedman of Augustus. Some have inferred from these data that Phaedrus was brought to Rome in his childhood as a slave following the Thracian campaign of L. Calpurnius Piso.

Whether in Rome or elsewhere, Phaedrus studied Latin literature in his youth, as he quotes a line from Ennius saying that he read it when he was a boy. When he had published his first two books of fables, he was subjected to a trial in which he says Sejanus was accuser, witness, and judge. Although it is not clear what punishment the poet suffered, the poet pleads with a certain Eutychus to intercede on his behalf in the prologue to his third book. In the epilogue of the third book, the poet describes himself as in advanced middle age, and the final poem of Phaedrus's fifth book implies that he had reached old age.

There is no external evidence by which to judge whether the poet spoke truthfully of himself, and scholars have assigned different degrees of significance to the biographical hints contained in the poems. Attilio de Lorenzi's biography Fedro is reviewed by Perry as a "consistent and convincing all-round picture of the man" with "nothing unreasonable or improbable in any of the author's conclusions," but derided by another reviewer as "a romance" born of "de Lorenzi's ingenious imagination" which is "entertaining to read, but not always easy to believe." Franz de Ruyt likewise disparages elements of de Lorenzi's reconstruction as tenuously supported and "novelistic," and declares Fedro an original and useful work on the whole, but one which must be used with caution for biographical facts. Edward Champlin, while acknowledging that the traditional account of Phaedrus's life is "handed down through the scholarly literature," derides even the broad outlines of it that are most commonly accepted as "complete fantasy" and argues that what Phaedrus had to say about himself might as plausibly be reinterpreted to prove that he was born in Rome and spent the whole of his life there as a free citizen. On the basis of "an astonishingly sophisticated interest in Roman law" seen in the poems, however, Champlin asserts that "Phaedrus was a lawyer."

Léon Herrmann purported to find new biographical information in the fables in the form of acrostics, many of which could not be found in the text without novel editorial interventions. Herrmann also attributed the Apocolocyntosis, the Distichs of Cato, and most of the Culex to Phaedrus and sifted these texts for further biographical clues. The second part of Herrmann's book was an edition of the fables (in a novel order and divided into four books) and the other works he ascribed to Phaedrus. C. J. Fordyce described Herrmann's book simply as "full of surprises", of which the greatest was that Herrmann was "an editor of Phaedrus, and a professor of Latin, to whom quantity appears to mean nothing at all and who by his own conjectures turns metrical lines into unmetrical on every other page." Frank Goodyear mocked a later editor for citing Herrmann, referring to him sarcastically as "that noted metrician". Alfred Ernout remarked that while he would leave Herrmann's biographical theories to be discussed by historians of literature, he could only regret the abundance of errors of every kind to be found in Herrmann's edition.

=== Name ===
Phaedrus's name appears in his own text and in Martial in the genitive case as Phaedri. It is found in the nominative case, as Phaedrus, in Avianus's letter to Theodosius, and in the titles of three of the fables, possibly added by scribes on the authority of Avianus. Some critics have argued the poet's name would more correctly be written Phaeder in the nominative, by analogy to Latin names like Alexander, Menander, and Anaximander which reflect Greek originals that end in -δρος, supported by evidence from ancient inscriptions of the use of the form Phaeder.

Roman slaves were known by a single name, in contrast with the tria nomina borne by citizens. Manumitted slaves in the early empire usually took the praenomen and nomen of their former master, keeping their slave name as a cognomen. Some sources therefore give the poet's full name as Gaius Julius Phaedrus (or Phaeder), with the praenomen and nomen of Augustus.

=== Dates ===
Because Sejanus died in AD 31, Phaedrus's statement that his poems had offended Sejanus is usually taken to establish that the first two books were written before that date. That the first two books were published (whether together or separately) in the reign of Tiberius is supported by II.5.7, where Tiberius appears to be referred to as alive. Most scholars infer from the hostile manner in which Phaedrus writes of Sejanus, as if he had nothing further to fear from him, that the third book was written after Sejanus' death, but not long after, since Phaedrus was still suffering the effects of persecution by Sejanus. Phaedrus's statement in the third book that he was in advanced middle age would therefore support an approximate birth date of 15 BC or 18 BC. Based on the poet's insinuation in the fifth book that he was worn out by old age like the dog in the fable, scholars conclude that he died an old man in the reign of Claudius (41–54) or Nero (54–68); Giuseppe Zago believes Phaedrus to have revised his first book after having read Seneca the Younger's Moral Epistles and books De beneficiis, in which case Phaedrus died in the reign of Nero or Vespasian (69–79).

== Textual sources ==
The following sources are of significance for establishing the text of Phaedrus:

- Codex Pithoeanus (New York, Pierpont Morgan Library, M. 906, ff. 33–87), so called because of its previous ownership by Pierre Pithou who used it to edit the editio princeps, was copied by several hands in the late 9th Century and contains 94 fables of Phaedrus divided into four books, bound together with the Liber Monstrorum. It was rebound in the 16th Century, now with a copy of Phaedrus on paper in Pithou's hand in the front. It was inherited by Pithou's great-grandson, Claude Le Peletier, whose family was granted the title of Marquis of Rosanbo by Louis XIV, and so has also been known as the Rosanbo manuscript. A paleographic edition was published in 1893 with the permission of the Marquis of Rosanbo, but the family afterwards denied scholars access to the manuscript, prompting Perry to remark that the codex was in "very private possession" and Postgate to compare the present owner to the dragon from one of Phaedrus's fables. It became more accessible after the Pierpont Morgan Library purchased it in 1961.
- Codex Remensis, formerly held at the Abbey of Saint-Remi, was copied ca. 830–850 and destroyed in a fire on January 16, 1774. The readings of this lost witness must be determined by the reports of printed editions and manuscript collations or tracings made by those who were able to have direct knowledge of the manuscript. It contained the same poems as the Codex Pithoeanus in the same order, bound together with the Querolus.
- Codex Reginensis Latinus 1616, preserved in the Vatican Library, contains the inscription of the first book immediately followed by eight fables from it (11–13 and 17–21) copied in the mid-9th Century at ff. 17r–18r. Despite the fragment's brevity, E. K. Rand declares it the best source for the fables which it contains. This fragment is also called the "vetus Danielis chartula" or "scheda Danielis" because of its previous ownership by Pierre Daniel, who acquired many of the books of Fleury Abbey after the monastery was plundered by Huguenots in 1562. Daniel's books were sold after his death to Jacques Bongars and Paul Pétau, and Pétau's share was largely acquired in 1650 by Isaac Vossius as the agent of Christina, Queen of Sweden, who took her library to Rome after abdicating the throne. Her books passed into the Vatican Library, and in her honor are catalogued as the reginenses, or "queenly" books.
- Codex Neapolitanus or Perottinus (Naples, Biblioteca Nazionale, IV F 58) is the sole independent witness of an Epitome fabellarum Aesopi Auieni et Phaedri composed by Niccolò Perotti, consisting of poems composed by Phaedrus, Avianus, and Perotti himself, in Perotti's hand and seemingly written after 1474. The waterlogged manuscript was discovered in the library of the Duke of Parma in early 1727 by Jacques Philippe d'Orville. About a decade after d'Orville's discovery, the codex was transferred from Parma to Naples following Charles III of Spain's inheritance of the Farneses' books and conquest of the Kingdom of Naples. The manuscript contains 66 poems by Phaedrus, or rather 63, as Perotti copied one fable twice, and two fables are each divided into two. 30 of these 63 poems were not in the Pithoeanus or Remensis. This manuscript's condition has so deteriorated over time due to water damage that in many places it can no longer be read, and recourse must be had to older copies and collations to determine its readings. Nearly all the lacunae can be filled by reference to two codices in the Vatican Library.
  - Codex Urbinas Latinus 368, ff. 100–146, containing the entire Epitome, was made from the Neapolitanus around 1482 by Federico Veterano. The manuscript was brought to light by Angelo Mai around 1830.
  - Codex Urbinas Latinus 301, the sole witness of a work by Perotti titled Cornucopiae, includes two fables of Phaedrus (III.17 at f. 644r and app. 4 at f. 126r–v).
  - The so-called schedae d'Orvillianae (Oxford, Bodleian Library, MS. d'Orville 524) are a copy of the Neapolitanus made by d'Orville in 1727. D'Orville's manuscripts were sold by his grandson to J. Cleaver Banks, who sold them to the Bodleian Library in 1804.
- Codex Vaticanus Latinus 5190, ff. 111r–125r, contains 22 fables of Phaedrus copied by two hands in the late 15th Century mixed with fables of Avianus, including 8 poems otherwise known only through the Neapolitanus, although it is evidently independent of Perotti.

=== Prose paraphrases ===
Several medieval fable collections made extensive use of Phaedrus "in solution," i.e., with the metrical verses adapted into prose. The following collections contain 54 fables that are preserved in the direct tradition, 28 that have been lost from it, and 16 from non-Phaedrian sources. Each of them is printed in Hervieux 1894, and the fables they contain which have no equivalent in the extant metrical text of Phaedrus are translated or summarized in Perry 1965.

- Codex Leidensis Vossianus Latinus O. 15 (Leiden University Library), copied in the early 11th Century by Adémar de Chabannes, contains 67 fables at ff. 195r–203v, all but a few of which are paraphrases of Phaedrus.
- Codex Wissemburgensis (Wolfenbüttel, Herzog August Library, Codex Gudianus Latinus 148), copied in the 10th Century and formerly at Weissenburg Abbey as the 15th Century ex libris shows, contains 62 fables arranged in five books at ff. 60v–82r.
- Romulus is the putative author of a collection of 83 fables divided into four books; this collection survives in many manuscripts and has been critically edited by Georg Thiele.

== Number and division of the fables ==
=== The five books ===
Avianus writes about AD 400 that Phaedrus wrote five books of fables. The 94 fables contained in the Pithoeanus are divided into four books, but the text in the Remensis ended with the subscription "PHAEDRI AVG(VSTI) LIBERTI LIBER QVINTVS EXPLICIT FELICITER" ("this is the end of the fifth book of Phaedrus, freedman of Augustus"), indicating that in the manuscript from which the Pithoeanus and Remensis were copied, the poems were divided into five books.

The remains of Phaedrus's five books transmitted in the Pithoeanus and Remensis are of unequal length and seem to indicate that material has been lost. This is supported by the apology in the prologue to the first book for including talking trees, of which there are no examples in the text that survives although there was one in the Perotti appendix. In fact, only 59 out of 94 in the Pithou manuscript were even animal fables.

=== Appendix Perottina ===
The 30 poems which were discovered in Codex Neapolitanus are known as the Appendix Perottina. Perotti, evidently unaware of the unique value of the manuscript from which he copied, excerpted fables in an arbitrary order. Some scholars have attempted to restore these fables to their places within the five books with divergent conclusions, but usually they are printed separately in the order in which they are found in Perotti's Epitome. Perotti omitted the epimythia and promythia, sometimes transferring their wording into titles of his own stating the moral, which he added to all the fables.

=== Fabulae novae ===
Joan Frederik Nilant edited the Phaedrian fables transmitted in solution in 1709. A number of editors have undertaken to restore their original metrical form, and these reconstructions are conventionally referred to as the fabulae novae, or "new fables." The first attempt was made by Pieter Burman the Elder in an appendix to his edition of 1718, which he omitted from his edition of 1727; J. Wight Duff says the omission was wise, as Burman made excessive and arbitrary changes in the words, and unavoidably violated some of Phaedrus's metrical principles, which were poorly understood in the 18th Century.

Jacobus Johannes Hartman declares that there neither is nor can be a Latin sentence that cannot be made into a Phaedrian senarius by a slight adjustment, parodically "restoring" sentences from The Gallic War and Justinian's Digest to a metrical form. Postgate defends the procedure of "exhuming" Phaedrus's poems from the prose collections by versification, though conceding that "in these reconstitutions ... we tread on treacherous ground" and "in some cases the metrical form cannot now be restored with completeness or with certainty." Postgate edited only ten fabulae novae in his edition, saying that previous editors, believing it to be their duty to Phaedrus to restore everything that was his, had not taken due account of the limits of what can be accomplished.

In 1921, Carl Magnus Zander published 30 fabulae novae. Duff praised Zander's reconstruction as more valuable than his predecessors' efforts due to his "strict parsimony in alterations" and the clear information provided about the prose basis of the reconstruction and what words were supplied by the editor.

== Work ==
A collection of Aesopic fables compiled by Demetrius of Phalerum is likely to have been Phaedrus's main source. Phaedrus himself says in the prologue to Book 1 that "Aesop" is his source, and it is likely Demetrius's book that he regarded as the canonical Aesop, as distinguished from fables drawn from other sources or invented by himself which he calls "Aesopic in kind but not Aesop's." Demetrius's collection was a handbook of material that writers and speakers could adapt to make a point in the context of a work of another genre. Phaedrus created a new form of polite literature by elevating the fable to an independent genre, to be read as literature in its own right and not as an adjunct to another kind of work. Aesopic fable had traditionally been written in prose; before Phaedrus, some versified fables had been incorporated into works of other genres, but he is the first author in Latin or Greek to publish entire books of versified fables. Phaedrus's verse is in iambic senarii and is very regular.

The author's aim at the start was to follow Aesop in creating a work that "moves one to mirth and warns with wise advice". As the work progressed, however, he widened his focus and now claimed to be "refining" Aesopic material and even adding to it. In later books we find tales of Roman events well after the time of Aesop such as "Tiberius and the slave" (II.5) and "Augustus and the accused wife" (III.9), as well as the poet's personal reply to envious detractors (IV.21); there are also anecdotes in which Aesop figures from the later biographical tradition (II.3; III.3; IV.5; app. 9; app. 20). Finally he makes a distinction between matter and manner in the epilogue to the fifth book, commenting that

I write in Esop’s style, not in his name,
And for the most part I the subject claim.
Tho' some brief portion Esop might indite,
The more I from my own invention write,
The style is ancient but the matter’s new.

He also claims a place in the Latin literary tradition by echoing well-known and respected writers. It is to be noticed, however, that where Phaedrus and the slightly earlier poet Horace adapted the same fable to satirical themes, they often used different versions of it. In Horace a crow (cornicula) is the subject of The Bird in Borrowed Feathers; in Phaedrus it is a jackdaw (graculus). In the case of The Horse that Lost its Liberty, Phaedrus has it disputing with a boar and Horace with a stag. Neither do they agree in their account of The Frog and the Ox. Horace follows the story found in Greek sources; the frog's motivation is different in Phaedrus, and it is his version that Martial follows later. Moreover, in following the model of Aesop, the enfranchised slave, Phaedrus's satire is sharper and restores "the ancient function of the fable as a popular expression against the dominant classes". Another commentator points out that "the Aesopian fable has been a political creature from its earliest origins, and Phaedrus, (who was La Fontaine's model), though more openly subversive, has claims to be the first proletarian satiric poet".

== Testimonia and ancient reception ==
=== Seneca and Cassius Longinus ===
Seneca the Younger, writing about AD 43, recommended in a letter to Claudius's freedman Polybius that he turn his hand to Latinizing Aesop, 'a task hitherto not attempted by Roman genius' (Ad Polybium 8.3). This may indicate that Seneca had not heard of Phaedrus's works, that Seneca deliberately ignored Phaedrus's works or did not consider them works of "Roman genius," or that Phaedrus's works did not yet exist and the traditional dating of his first three books in the reign of Tiberius is mistaken. However, it is highly likely that Seneca knew the works of Phaedrus.

Ulpian records that Cassius Longinus, who died not long after AD 70, was accustomed to use the term "a leonine partnership" for a partnership where one partner takes all of the profits and the other partners run all of the risk, indicating that Cassius was familiar with a fable invented by Phaedrus about the lion taking all the profits of his partnership with the other animals (I.5).

=== Martial ===
By the mid-80s, Martial was imitating Phaedrus and mentions his mischievous humour (improbi jocos Phaedri, "the jests of naughty Phaedrus"). Whether Martial referred to the author of fables or to another man of the same name has been disputed. Interpreting the adjective improbi as modifying jocos, Johann Friedrich Fischer argued that Phaedrus's fables cannot rightly be called joci because they are not apt to provoke laughter, nor are they improbi (interpreted in the sense that they required hard work to accomplish) because Phaedrus wrote light verse about common, everyday things. Fischer believed the verse referred to Phaedrus the Epicurean. Others have proposed that Martial's Phaedrus is an otherwise unknown author of mimes. Ludwig Friedländer argues that Martial often uses improbus as a synonym of lascivus, or "bawdy," and Phaedrus's fables do not answer to this description, but Martial does associate the word improbus with mimes. Frédéric Plessis accepts Friedländer's reasoning.

Johann Friedrich Gronovius interpreted the word improbus to mean "bold" or "impudent," and considered it sufficiently explained by the fact that Phaedrus had represented animals and trees as speaking in his fables, and by the fact that through his fables, he had lampooned the behavior of the mighty of his age. Léopold Hervieux considered Gronovius to have demonstrated beyond any doubt that Martial referred to the fabulist. Wilhelm Siegmund Teuffel rejects Friedländer's hypothesis as lacking probability. Robinson Ellis identifies several fables as containing indecent content that can explain the designation improbus, and notes that more may have been contained in lost writings of Phaedrus.

Whether this line by Martial originally referred to jocos is also disputed. The best manuscripts read locos or locus. Later manuscripts read jocos, which has been adopted by editors, but may be no more than an emendation by an Italian humanist. Following a suggestion originally made by Georg Thiele, several editors since 1925 have emended this word to the Greek word λόγους, used in Latin as a loanword signifying "fables." A. E. Housman grants that both improbi and jocos have such associations that this combination of words could be taken to suggest lascivious poems, and that there are no poems extant in Phaedrus's corpus which would merit this description, but argues that besides the fact that Phaedrus himself calls his fables joci, improbus need mean nothing more than that Phaedrus was "disrespectful," which "may allude to those hits at the high and mighty which are supposed to have provoked the displeasure of Sejanus", and emending to λόγους "leaves improbi freer to mean what it ought."

=== Subsequent authors ===
Quintilian does not mention Phaedrus by name, but recommends as a school exercise that students compose prose versions of versified fables of Aesop, a genre originated by Phaedrus. This passage is interpreted by J. P. Postgate to praise a particular poet (taken by Postgate to be Phaedrus) who had told Aesop's fables in a "pure style." This is disputed, however, by F. H. Colson, who takes the sermo purus in this passage to refer to a style to be demanded of students in their own compositions.

The next literary reference is a homage by Phaedrus's fellow fabulist Avianus near the start of the 5th century, who claims the five books of fables as one of his sources in the dedication of his own work. The author of Octavia, Tertullian, Nemesianus, Ausonius, St. Paulinus of Nola, Prudentius, the author of the Alcestis Barcinonensis, and the author of the Querolus also appear to have read and imitated Phaedrus, but no author from antiquity mentions him by name other than Martial and Avianus. Whether Juvenal read Phaedrus is uncertain.

István Szamosközy discovered the verse nisi utile est quod facimus, stulta est gloria inscribed on a tomb in Alba Iulia, and published it in 1593. This was later identified as a line from Phaedrus. According to Johannes Tröster, this inscription still existed in 1666. Theodor Mommsen does not consider the inscription genuine.

== Modern reception ==
François Pithou discovered Codex Pithoeanus in 1596, at which time Phaedrus's work had fallen into complete oblivion, and sent the manuscript to his brother Pierre Pithou, who used it to publish the editio princeps. Pithou left no record of where this manuscript was found except for a note at the end of his edition that said, "vet. ex. Cat." Johann Caspar von Orelli plausibly took this to be an abbreviation of vetus exemplar Catalaunense ("an ancient copy from Châlons-en-Champagne") or Catuacense ("from Douai"). Nicolas Rigault brought out an edition in 1599 based on both the Pithoeanus and the scheda Danielis, and a new edition in 1617 (with minor corrections in 1630) taking into account the evidence of the Remensis.

Codex Neapolitanus was discovered at Parma by Jacques Philippe d'Orville in 1727. D'Orville informed his professor Pieter Burman the Elder of the find, but Burman did not attempt to edit the previously unknown poems because the manuscript was illegible in many places.

The Neapolitanus was rediscovered in Naples in 1808 by Juan Andrés, S.J. Giovanni Antonio Cassitto hastily brought out an edition of it from a copy made in the library by his brother, while Andrés, unaware of Cassitto's work, commissioned Cataldo Jannelli to produce an edition; Jannelli's edition was in the hands of the printers when Cassitto's edition unexpectedly appeared. A bitter scholarly controversy ensued as Jannelli strove to vindicate the superiority of his edition. Cassitto's first edition was printed in only fifty copies, and is of no value except as a bibliographical curiosity. Both editions lost much of their interest when Angelo Mai published a much better preserved copy of Perotti's Epitome in 1831.

The fables of Phaedrus soon began to be published as school editions, both in the original Latin and in prose translation. Since the 18th century there have also been four complete translations into English verse. The first was by Christopher Smart into octosyllabic couplets (London 1753). Brooke Boothby's "The Esopean Fables of Phedrus" were included in his Fables and Satires (Edinburgh, 1809) and also used octosyllables but in a more condensed manner:

What Esop taught his beasts in Greek,
Phedrus in Latin made them speak:
In English, I from him translate,
And his brief manner imitate.

It was followed by the Reverend Frederick Toller's A poetical version of the fables of Phædrus in 1854. These were translated more diffusely into irregular verses of five metrical feet and each fable was followed by a prose commentary. P. F. Widdows' translation also includes the fables in the Perotti appendix and all are rendered into a free version of Anglo-Saxon alliterative verse.

Phaedrus versions were translated individually by a variety of other poets into different languages. A small selection in various poetic forms appeared in the Poems & Translations (London 1769) of Ashley Cowper (1701–88). There were many more poems distinctively styled in La Fontaine's Fables; others followed by Ivan Krylov in Russian; Gregory Skovoroda and Leonid Hlibov in Ukrainian; and a more complete collection by Volodymyr Lytvynov in 1986.

== Bibliography ==
=== Editions ===
- Pierre Pithou, ed., Phaedri Aug. liberti Fabularum Aesopiarum libri V (Troyes: Jean Oudot, 1596)
- Nicolas Rigault, ed., Phaedri Aug. liberti fabularum Æsopiarum lib. V (Paris, 1599)
- Nicolas Rigault, ed., Phaedri Aug. liberti fabularum Aesopiarum libri V (Paris: Robert Estienne, 1617)
- Nicolas Rigault, ed., Phaedri Aug. liberti fabularum Æsopiarum libri V (Paris, 1630)
- Peter Axen, ed., Phaedri, Augusti liberti, fabularum Aesopiarum libri quinque (Hamburg, 1671)
- Pieter Burman the Elder, ed., Phædri, Aug. liberti fabularum Æsopiarum libri V (Amsterdam, 1698)
- Pieter Burman the Elder, ed., Phaedri, Aug. liberti, fabularum Aesopiarum libri V (The Hague, 1718)
- Pieter Burman the Elder, ed., Phaedri, Augusti liberti, fabularum Aesopiarum libri quinque (Leiden, 1727)
- Cataldo Jannelli, ed., Codex Perottinus Ms. Regiae Bibliothecae Neapolitanae duas et triginta Phaedri fabulas iam notas, totidem novas ... continens (Naples, 1811)
- The fables of Phædrus, with a literal English translation (London, 1828)
- Jules Berger de Xivrey, ed., Phaedri Aug. Liberti Fabularum Æsopiarum libros quatuor (Paris, 1830)
- Johann Caspar von Orelli, ed., Phaedri Aug. liberti fabulae Aesopiae (Zurich: Orelli, Fuesslin, & Co., 1831)
- C. T. Dressler, ed., Phaedri Augusti liberti fabulae Aesopiae (Bautzen, 1838)
- Lucian Müller, ed., Phaedri Augusti liberti Fabulae Aesopiae (Leipzig: B. G. Teubner, 1867)
- Lucian Müller, ed., Phaedri Fabulae Aesopiae (Leipzig: B. G. Teubner, 1877)
- Léopold Hervieux, ed., Les Fabulistes latins, vol. II, 2nd ed. (Paris, 1894)
- Louis Havet, ed., Phaedri Augusti liberti Fabulae Aesopiae (Paris, 1895)
- Domenico Bassi, ed., Phaedri Fabulae ad fidem codicis Neapolitani (Turin: Paravia, 1918)
- John Percival Postgate, ed., Phaedri Fabulae Aesopiae (Oxford: Clarendon Press, 1920)
- Carol Zander, ed., Phaedrus solutus, vel Phaedri fabulae novae XXX (Lund: C. W. K. Gleerup, 1921)
- Léon Herrmann, Phèdre et ses fables (Leiden: Brill, 1950)
- Felice Ramorino, ed. and comm., Le Favole di Fedro, 5th ed. (Turin: Giovanni Chiantore, 1925)
- Felice Ramorino, ed. and comm., with additions by Francesco Della Corte, Le Favole di Fedro, 6th ed. (Turin, 1959)
- Ben Edwin Perry, ed. and tr., Babrius and Phaedrus: Fables (Harvard University Press, 1965)
- Aldo Marsili, ed., Phaedri Augusti liberti fabularum Aesopiarum libri (Pisa, 1966)
- Antonio Guaglianone, ed., Liber Fabularum (Turin: Paravia, 1969)
- Otto Schönberger, ed. and tr., Liber Fabularum/Fabelbuch (Stuttgart, 1979)
- Eulogio Baeza Angulo, ed. and tr., Fedro. Fábulas esópicas (Madrid, 2011)
- Niklas Holzberg, ed. and tr., Fabeln (Berlin: De Gruyter, 2018)
- Giovanni Zago, ed., Fabulae Aesopiae (Berlin: De Gruyter, 2020)

=== Translations ===
==== English ====
- Anonymous 1828
- Gibbs, Laura (2002). Aesop's Fables. Oxford World's Classics. Oxford University Press.
- Henderson, John (2001). Telling Tales on Caesar: Roman Stories from Phaedrus. Oxford University Press.
- Henderson, John (2004). Aesop's Human Zoo: Roman Stories about Our Bodies. University of Chicago Press.
- Perry 1965
- Riley, Henry Thomas (1880). The Comedies of Terence and the Fables of Phaedrus Literally Translated into English Prose. London: George Bell & Sons.
- Smart, Christopher (1765). A Poetical Translation of the Fables of Phaedrus. London: J. Dodsley.
- Smart, Christopher (1996) [1765]. Williamson, Karina (ed.). The Poetical Works of Christopher Smart, Vol. 6: A Poetical Translation of the Fables of Phaedrus. Oxford: Clarendon Press. ISBN 9780198183600.
- Rev. Frederick Toller, A Poetical Version of the Fables of Phædrus (London: J. and C. Mozley, 1854)
- P. F. Widdows, The Fables of Phaedrus (Austin: The University of Texas Press, 1992)

==== French ====
- Tournier, Henri (2006). Fables grecques et latines. Babrius et Phèdre. Aix-en-Provence: Publications de l'université de Provence.

==== German ====
- Schönberger 1979
- Holzberg 2018

==== Spanish ====
- Baeza Angulo 2011

=== Commentary ===
- Gärtner, Ursula (2015). Phaedrus. Ein Interpretationskommentar zum ersten Buch der Fabeln. Munich.
- Henderson 2001
- Henderson 2004
- Luzzatto, Maria Jagoda, ed. (1976). Fedro: Un poeta tra favola e realtà. Turin: Paravia.
- Oberg, Eberhard (2000). Phaedrus-Kommentar (in German). Stuttgart: Franz Steiner Verlag.
- Ramorino 1959 (in Italian)

=== General sources ===
- Gärtner, Ursula (2015). "Phaedrus 1975–2014". Lustrum (in German). 57: 7–90. doi:10.13109/lutr.2015.57.1.7.
- Holzberg, Niklas (1991). "Phaedrus in der Literaturkritik seit Lessing. Alte und neue Wege der Interpretation". Anregung. 37 (4): 226–242.
- Lamb, R. W. (1998). Annales Phaedriani 1596–1996: A Bibliography of Phaedrus. Lowestoft: privately printed. ISBN 0-95333610-7.
