= Antoine Loysel =

French jurist-consultant

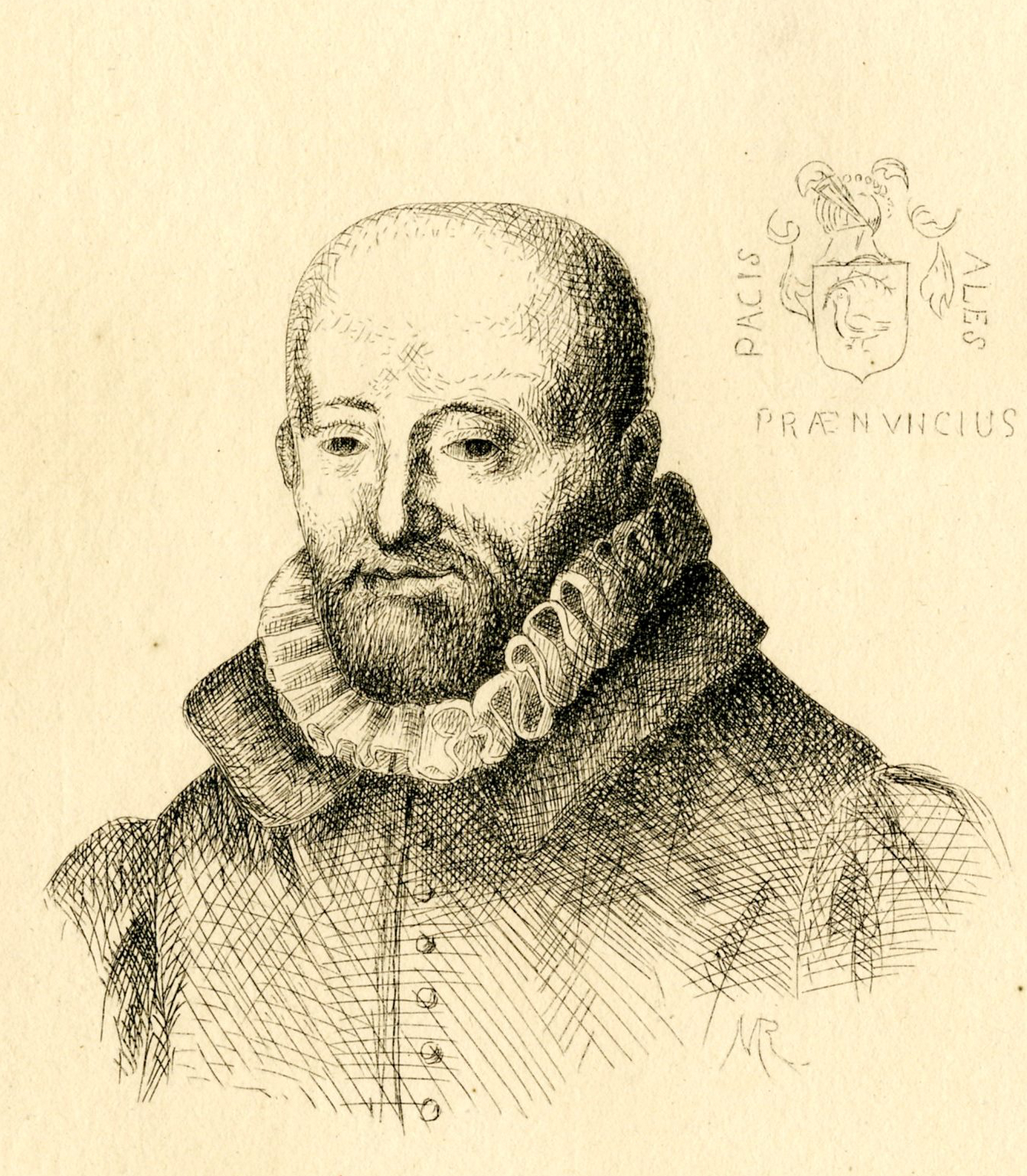
Engraving of Antoine Loisel, from the portrait kept at the Beauvais Museum

Antoine Loysel, Seigneur of Courroy, Fouilloy and Églantier (16 February 1536 – 28 April 1617) was a French jurisconsult known for collecting the general principles of old French customary law.

== Biography ==
=== Family and youth ===
Loysel was born in Beauvais, the son of Catherine d'Auvergne and Jean Loisel, an alderman and advisor to the king elected in the election of Beauvais.. His brother, Philippe Loisel, held positions as a civil and criminal lieutenant-general at the bailiwick of Senlis and master of requests for the Duke of Anjou. On 2 August 1563, Loysel married Marie de Goulas (1541–1595), who was a first cousin of Nicolas Goulas and the niece of Jean-Baptiste Dumesnil, a lawyer to the king before the Parlement of Paris. Together, Antoine and Marie had 12 children, and Loysel also became the stepfather of Guillaume Marescot.

"He wanted to devote himself to medicine, like his great-uncle Jean Loysel, physician to Louis XII and François I. His father did not approve, saying that despite the danger to which doctors were forced to expose themselves from day to day, a doctor could only ever be a doctor; but a lawyer could become president and chancellor."

In Toulouse, Loysel met Jacques Cujas, who inspired him to continue his studies in law.

Loysel became friends with Pierre Pithou, to whom he was introduced by a mutual acquaintance.

He was, with Nicolas Bergeron, the executor of the will of Petrus Ramus.

== Career ==
Successor to Charles Dumoulin, he is considered the first "thinker" of French law.

Loysel was a disciple of Jacques Cujas, whom he followed to Bourges, where he studied the methods of Humanist historians.

In February 1560, he received his lawyer designation in Paris. He became the Attorney General of Paris in 1564.

Some of his notable clients included Francis, Duke of Anjou, brother of Henry III of France, Catherine de Medici, the House of Montmorency, and the chapter of Our Lady of Paris. He ended his career as a public prosecutor at the Chamber of Justice in Limoges.

Loysel was a good follower of mos gallicus - the method of the humanists, which would move him away from the study of Roman law and history. Politically, he was a staunch defender of the king and the powers of the king and would, therefore, consider that the law must be that of the kingdom. He spoke first of a French law before speaking of a "Universal Law of our Kingdom". He believed that customs are "finally reduced to conformity, the reason for a single law". He wrote his work Institutes coutumières in 1607, whose form is Roman and background customary.

Loysel spent 40 years on his collection of the 958 maxims. It is an expression of French law. By merging the rules of many customs and Roman law, Loysel set the foundation for French law.

== Quotes ==
Loysel liked to find formulas to synthesize the law into a series of legal adages. Many are still valid:

- "He who wants the king, wants the law."
- "Whoever makes the child must feed him."
- ""An engaged girl is neither taken nor left; for many get engaged who never marry."
- "In marriage, may the one who can deceive, deceive."
- "Vestments do not make the monk, but the profession does."
- "Oxen are bound by their horns, and men by their words."
- "He does enough who has things done."
- "To all lords, all honours."
- "It is better to receive one in hand today, than two promises of "Tomorrow".
- "One time does not make a tradition."
- "In crime, [there] is no guarantor."
- "People used to say: ‘'Drinking, eating, and sleeping together — that’s marriage, it seems to me.' But the Church must still have its say."
- "The one who sells the pot, names the price."
- "He who could prevent a sin and does not, sins."

== Works ==
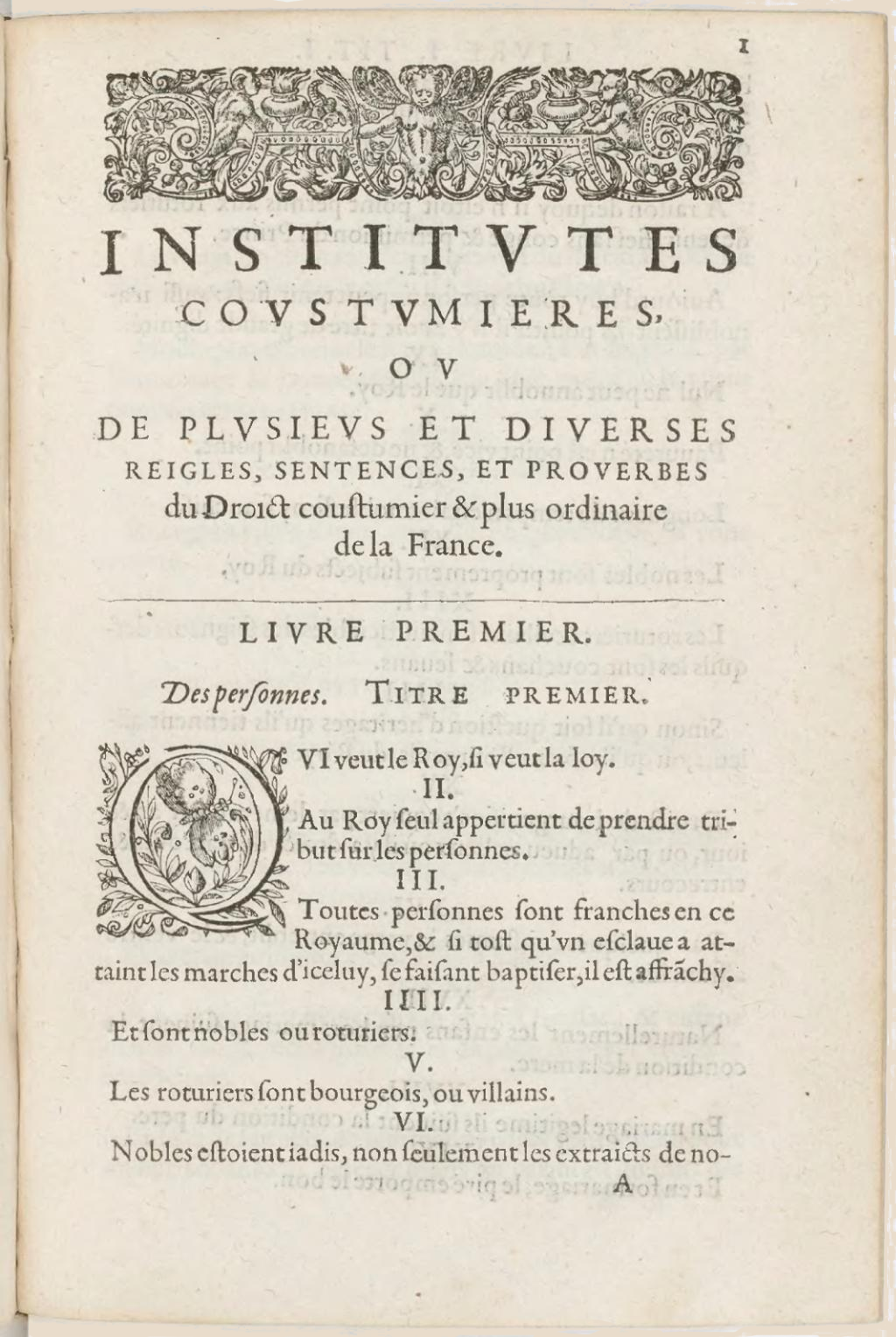
Customary institutes, 1607

Editions published between 1607 and 1846:

- 1607 - Antoine Loysel, Institutes coutumières: Ou manuel de pluſieurs & diuerſes reigles, ſentences, & Prouerbes tant anciens que modernes du Droict Couſtumier & plus ordinaire de la France, Paris, Abel L'Angelier, 1607, 1 st ed., 80 p. (OCLC 829487475, notice BnF FRBNF30828453)
- 1608 - Antoine Loysel, Institutes coutumières: Ou manuel de pluſieurs & diuerſes reigles, ſentences, & Prouerbes tant anciens que modernes du Droict Couſtumier & plus ordinaire de la France, Paris, Abel L'Angelier, 1608, 79 p. (OCLC 763879801, notice BnF FRBNF30828454)
- 1637 - Antoine Loysel, Institutes coutumières: Ou manuel de pluſieurs & diuerſes reigles, ſentences, & Prouerbes tant anciens que modernes du Droict Couſtumier & plus ordinaire de la France, Paris, 1637, 4 th ed., 79 p. ( OCLC 492825621, notice BnF FRBNF30828455)
- 1679 - Antoine Loysel, Institutes coutumières: Ou manuel de pluſieurs & diuerſes reigles, ſentences, & Prouerbes tant anciens que modernes du Droict Couſtumier & plus ordinaire de la France, Paris, 1679, 7 th ed. (OCLC 43093703, notice BnF FRBNF30828456 )
- 1710 - Antoine Loysel, Institutes coutumières: Avec des renvois aux Ordonnances de nos Rois, aux Coûtumes & aux Autheurs qui les ont commentées, aux Arrêts, aux anciens Pratticiens, & aux Hiſtoriens dont les regles ont été tirées, Paris,1710, 8 th ed. (OCLC 84182748, notice BnF FRBNF30828458 )( Antoine Loysel and Eusèbe Jacques de Laurière ( eds. ), Inſtitutes costumieres, vol. 1,1710 (OCLC 165672146, read on Wikisource, read online [ archive ] ), Antoine Loysel and Eusèbe Jacques de Laurière (eds.), Inſtitutes costumieres, vol. 2,1710 (OCLC 165672150, read on Wikisource, read online [ archive ] ))
- 1758 - Antoine Loysel, Institutes coutumières: Avec des renvois aux Ordonnances de nos Rois, aux Coûtumes & aux Autheurs qui les ont commentées, aux Arrêts, aux anciens Pratticiens, & aux Hiſtoriens dont les regles ont été tirées, Paris, Durand,1758, 9 th ed. (OCLC 457538619, notice BnF FRBNF30828459)( Customary Intitutes, vol. 1, Customary Intitutes, vol. 2)
- 1783 - Antoine Loysel, Institutes coutumières: Avec des renvois aux Ordonnances de nos Rois, aux Coûtumes & aux Autheurs qui les ont commentées, aux Arrêts, aux anciens Pratticiens, & aux Hiſtoriens dont les regles ont été tirées, Paris, Durand,1783, 10 th ed. (OCLC 902289863, notice BnF FRBNF39372794)(Institutes coutumières, vol. 1, Institutes coutumières, vol. 2)
- 1846 - Antoine Loysel, André Marie Jean Jacques Dupin ( dir. ) And Édouard Lefebvre de Laboulaye ( dir. ), Institutes coutumières: Ou manuel de plusieurs et diverses règles, sentences et proverbes, tant anciens que modernes du droit coutumier et plus ordinaire de la France, Paris, Durand,1846, 13 th ed. (OCLC 486218798, notice BnF FRBNF30828462, read on Wikisource )( Antoine Loysel, Customary institutes, vol. 1,1846 ( read on Wikisource ), Antoine Loysel, Institutes coutumières, vol. 2, 1846 ( read on Wikisource ))

== Bibliography ==
- Jean-Luc A. Chartier, Loisel. Avocat du roi (1536–1617), Paris, 2019, 203 p.
- Charles-Louis-Étienne Truinet, "Éloge d'Antoine Loysel prononcé à la séance d'ouverture de la conférence de l'ordre des avocats, le 9 décembre 1852", Paris, C. Lahure, December 1852, 32 p., In-8º
- S. de Beaufort, Une famille de lieutenants généraux du bailliage de Senlis aux XVIe et XVIIe siècles, les Loysel, Senlis archaeological committee, 1899
- Nègre Desrivières, Notes généalogiques sur la famille Loysel, Loisel, L'Oisel (Avis), seigneurs de Quévremont, de Flambermont, d'Exonviller, etc. - XVe, XVe et XVIIe siècles, Archaeological Committee of Senlis, 1899
- Armand Demasure, Antoine Loisel et son temps (1536–1617), Thorin, 1876
