= The Frog and the Ox =

Aesop's fable

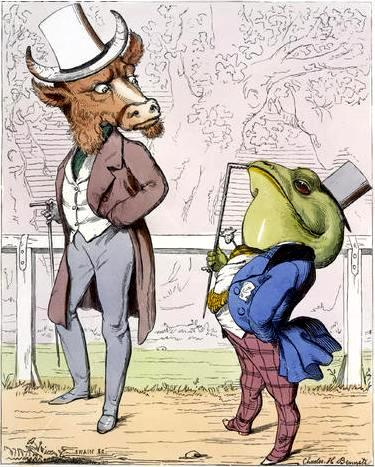
Charles H. Bennett's class-conscious interpretation of the fable, 1857

The Frog and the Ox appears among Aesop's Fables and is numbered 376 in the Perry Index. The story concerns a frog that tries to inflate itself to the size of an ox, but bursts in the attempt. It has usually been applied to socio-economic relations.

== Versions of the fable ==
There are Classical versions of the story in both Greek and Latin, as well as several Latin retellings in medieval times. One by Walter of England is in verse and was followed in Renaissance times by a Neo-Latin poem by Hieronymus Osius. In some sources, the frog sees the ox and tries to equal it in size; in others the frog is only told of an enormous beast by another and keeps swelling, asking at intervals, 'Was it as big as this?'

Both Martial and Horace are among the Latin satiric poets who made use of the fable of the frog and the ox, although they refer to different versions of it. The story related by Phaedrus has a frog motivated by envy of the ox, illustrating the moral that 'the needy man, while affecting to imitate the powerful, comes to ruin'. It is to this that Martial alludes in a short epigram (X.79) about two citizens trying to outdo each other by building in the suburbs. Horace places a different version of the story towards the end of a long conversation on the demented behaviour of mankind (Satires II.3) where Damasippus accuses the poet of trying to keep up with his rich patron Maecenas. His telling follows the Babrius version in which an ox has stepped on a brood of young frogs and the father tries equaling the beast in size when told of it.

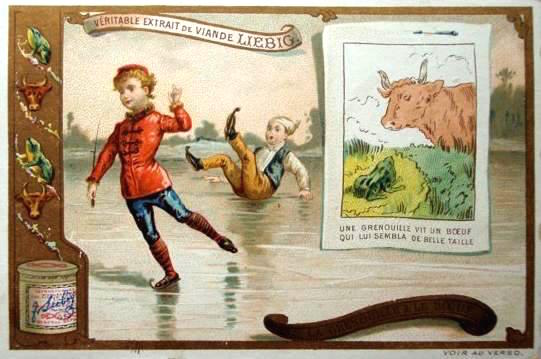
A 19th-century meat extract trade card with the first two lines of the La Fontaine's version.

The folly of trying to keep up with the Joneses is the conclusion drawn by La Fontaine's Fables from the Phaedrus version of the tale, applying it to the artistocratic times in which La Fontaine lived ("The frog that wished to be as big as the ox", Fables I.3):

This world of ours is full of foolish creatures too –
Commoners want to build chateaux;
Each princeling wants his royal retinue;
Each count his squires. And so it goes.

Two similar stories existed in Greek sources but were never adopted in the rest of Europe. There is a quatrain in Babrius concerning an earthworm that envied the length of a snake and burst in two while stretching itself to equal it. This is number 268 in the Perry Index. In the other fable, numbered 371 by Perry, a lizard destroys itself in a similar way. The moral given is that 'This is what happens to someone who competes with his superiors: he destroys himself before he can equal them.'

There are also African variations on the theme, including one related among the Fon people of Benin in which a frog competes similarly against an ox until it bursts. The moral of this tale is that ambitions should be kept moderate. In some other communities there are proverbs based on such stories, as for example, "The frog imitated the elephant and burst" in Kirundi and in Amharic; and in the Chewa language of Zambia, simply "The proud frog burst open" in an attempt to seem more than he was.

== Artistic uses ==
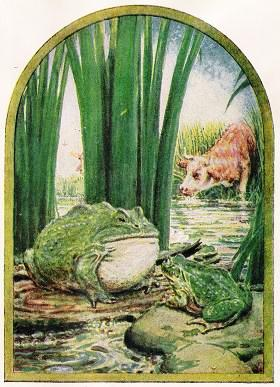
John Rae's illustration to Fables in Rhyme for Little Folks, 1918

The fable was a favourite in England and was put to popular use on 18th century china by the Fenton pottery and in the 19th century by the Wedgwood pottery. This was on its Aesop series of coloured plates, signed by Emile Lessore in the 1860s. Minton's pottery also used the fable on a series of Aesop tiles a little later. In France a biscuit porcelain figure group illustrating the fable was issued by the Haffreingue porcelain factory at Boulogne between 1857 and 1859. The ox is modeled lying on the ground and looking down at the frog directly in front.

Other uses have been the appearance of the fable on stamps during the centenary of La Fontaine's death in 1995. In France it was on one of a strip of six 2,80 franc stamps, each illustrating a different fable; in Albania the fable appears by itself on the 25 leke stamp and as part of the over-all design of the 60 leke commemorative. Then on the 400th centenary of La Fontaine's birth in 2021, Hungary featured it on the four-stamp commemorative sheet designed by Zsolt Vidák.

Among the composers who have set the fable are the following:

- W. Langton Williams (c. 1832–1896) in his Aesop's Fables, versified & arranged for the piano forte (London, 1890)
- Charles Lecocq, the third piece in his Six Fables de Jean de la Fontaine for voice and piano (1900)
- Mabel Wood Hill in her "Aesop's Fables Interpreted Through Music" (1920)
- Marcelle de Manziarly, the third piece in Trois Fables de La Fontaine (1935) for voice and piano
- Paul Bonneau in 10 Fables de La Fontaine for a cappella duet (1957)
- Marie-Madeleine Chevalier-Duruflé as the first in her 6 Fables de La Fontaine (1960) for a cappella female voices
- Jean Françaix for 4 male voices and piano (1963)
- Edward Hughes, as the third in his ten Songs from Aesop's Fables for children's voices and piano (1965), in a version by Peter Westmore
- Andre Asriel, Der Frosch und der Ochse, the second in his 6 Fabeln nach Aesop for mixed a cappella voices (1972)
- Isabelle Aboulker among the seven in her children's operetta La Fontaine et le Corbeau (1977)
- Claude Ballif, the third of his Chansonettes : 5 Fables de La Fontaine for small mixed choir (Op.72, No.1 1995)
- Xavier Benguerel i Godó, the sixth piece in his 7 Fabulas de la Fontaine (1995) for orchestra and narration (in both Catalan and Spanish translations)
- Vladimir Cosma, the second piece in his Eh bien ! Dansez maintenant, a divertissement for narrator and symphony orchestra (2006), in this case styled as a mazurka.
- Eric Saint-Marc, a setting for women's choir, piano and string quartet (2014)

== See also ==
- Exploding toad
- Rana rupta et bos
