= Gold Dust washing powder =

Commercial line of all-purpose cleaning agents

Fairbank's Gold Dust Brands
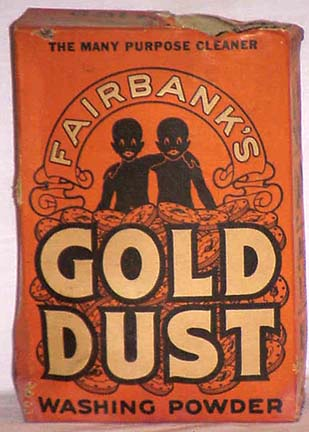
- Early Gold Dust Washing Powder product box
- Product type: Laundry detergent
- Current owner: Unilever Corporation
- Country: United States
- Introduced: 1889
- Related brands: Gold Dust washing powder, Gold Dust scouring soap
- Markets: United States, Canada, and the United Kingdom.
- Previous owners: N. K. Fairbank Corporation
- Website: http://www.unilever.com/

Fairbank's Gold Dust washing products was a line of all-purpose cleaning agents researched and developed by the N. K. Fairbank Manufacturing Company. First introduced to the American consumer in 1889, Gold Dust Washing Powder became a success due in large part to its low selling price and bright, eye-catching packaging. The most easily recognized members of the soap line were Gold Dust Washing Powder and Gold Dust Scouring Soap. They were marketed in boxes and containers prominently featuring the brand's well known trademark, the Gold Dust Twins. "Let the Twins Do Your Work" was the product's long lasting and ubiquitous slogan.

== Background ==
The Fairbanks Company, founded in 1864, was part of a changing landscape in American businesses' drive to give consumers more freedom in the timely completion of daily chores. The task of doing laundry began to change with the introduction of washing powders in the 1880s. Until that time, laundry was done using hard bar soap, washboards, and the repeated beating and wringing of the clothing items. The success of several new laundry washing products introduced late in the 19th century had proven that there was a ready market for what the consumer believed to be better and more economical cleaning agents. Many of these new products, however, were simply pulverized soap and fell short of having any significant improvement in doing the laundry.

Following its 1875 acquisition by the American Cotton Oil Company, Fairbanks was renamed N.K. Fairbanks & Co. In the next quarter century the New York-based company introduced several soaps and soap powders to America, including Gold Dust washing powder and Gold Dust scouring soap. Powdered soap proved to be a substantial improvement over the use of simple, pulverized bar soaps.

== Product history ==
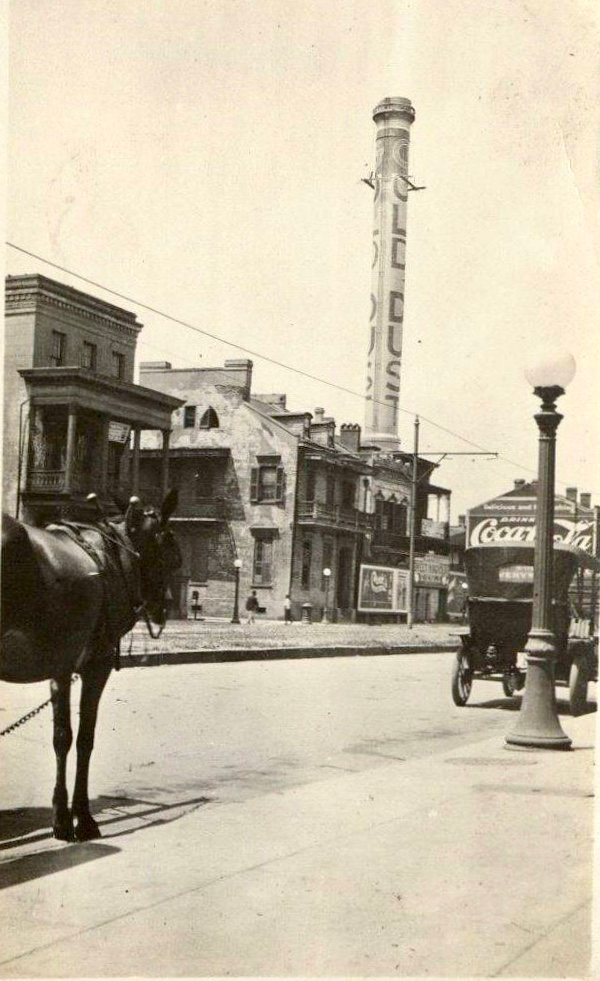
Gold Dust advertising on smoke stacks circa 1900

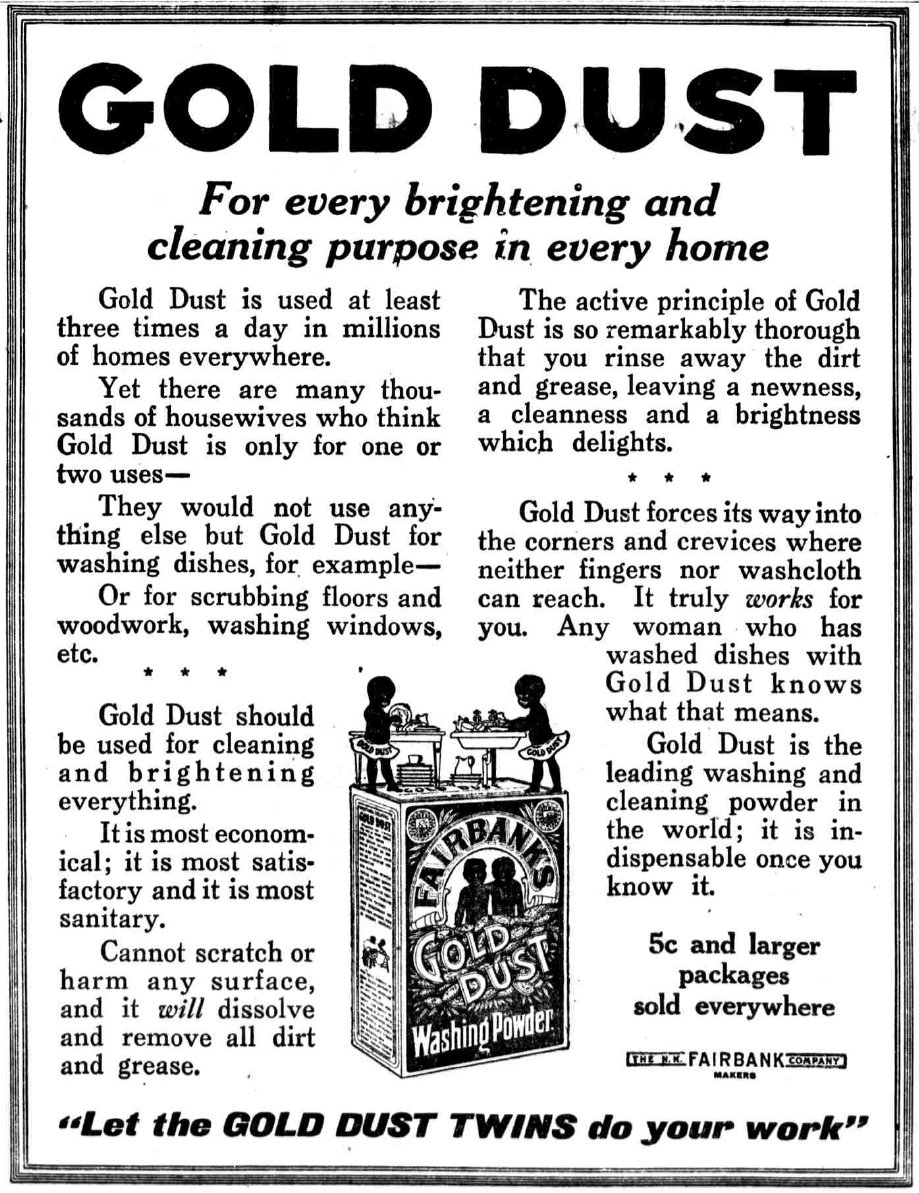
Ad from 1915 for Gold Dust, depicting the twins, Goldie and Dusty, doing the dishes perched on top of a box of the product

Introduced in 1889 by the N.K. Fairbank Company, Gold Dust washing powder was the first all-purpose laundry powder made possible by employing hydrogenated vegetable oils in its processing, a procedure the company pioneered, and industry quickly embraced. The formula for Gold Dust washing powder was developed and refined by industrial chemist James Boyce working at the Chicago, Illinois research lab of the company.

While working at the research facility, Boyce developed an industrial hydrogenation procedure, which, when applied to cottonseed (and other plant materials), was a scientific breakthrough in cottonseed processing. The incidental discovery that the process also rendered the modified, extracted cottonseed oil as edible led to a revolution in food processing that was quickly exploited by the French chemist Paul Sabatier and manufacturing giants such as Procter & Gamble. The development and manufacture of oleomargarine and other oil-based consumer products was a direct result of Boyce's discovery.

Initially a regional success in the Midwestern United States, Gold Dust Washing Powder rose to national prominence after the brand was licensed for distribution in America by the Lever Brothers Company, headquartered at the time in Cambridge, Massachusetts. By 1903 it was the top-selling brand of powdered soap in America, and was being marketed under license in Canada and Great Britain by Lever Brothers.

=== The Gold Dust Twins mascots ===
By 1892, the product's advertising and attention-grabbing packaging—black and white graphics on a bright orange background—became more focused on the iconic Gold Dust Twins. The Gold Dust Twin characters of Goldie and Dustie were the faces of Gold Dust products through most of their production, becoming one of the earliest brand-driven trademarks in American advertising. They were often comically depicted, along with a huge stack of dishes in a washtub, with one twin cleaning, the other drying. The Gold Dust Twins Radio Show—first broadcast in 1929 and created around the twins (and sponsored jointly by Gold Dust and Lever Brothers)—was one of the first of its kind in marketing history. The back of the box depicted the twins tackling several household chores and a list of jobs made easier by using Gold Dust washing powder. "Let the Twins Do Your Work" was the product's slogan.

== End of the line ==
In 1928, "the original company (the pre-existing Best Foods, Inc.) was taken over by the Gold Dust Corporation", (owners of American Cotton Oil Co. and American Linseed Co.).

In the 1930s, Lever Brothers purchased the Gold Dust brand outright. Gold Dust washing powder, found in many U.S. homes during the first half of the twentieth century, had a strong presence in the marketplace for more than sixty-five years. However, changing national sensibilities over the brand's mascots, combined with increased marketing pressure from newer competing lines (especially Procter & Gamble's "Tide"), caused the post-war demise of the Gold Dust product lines.
