= Querolus =

Anonymous late antique Latin comedy

Start of an excerpt from Querolus, misattributed to Plautus, in a 12th- or 13th-century copy of the Florilegium Gallicum, an anthology of classical authors

Querolus (The Complainer) or Aulularia (The Pot) is an anonymous Latin comedy from late antiquity, the only Latin drama to survive from this period and the only ancient Latin comedy outside the works of Plautus and Terence.

== Title and origins ==
In his prologue to the spectators the author first says Aululariam hodie sumus acturi (‘We are going to perform the Aulularia today’), then offers a choice of title: Querolus an Aulularia haec dicatur fabula, vestrum hinc iudicium, vestra erit sententia (‘Whether this play is called Querolus or Aulularia will be your judgement, your decision’). The archetype of the surviving manuscripts seem to have had the title Aulularia, along with a false attribution to Plautus, who had also written an Aulularia. Modern scholars generally use the title Querolus to avoid confusion with Plautus’ Aulularia.

Date and place of composition are uncertain. Mention of lawlessness ad Ligerem (‘by the Loire’) suggests a Gallic origin and perhaps an early fifth-century date, if it refers to a Bagaudae uprising. The work is addressed and dedicated to a certain Rutilius (perhaps Rutilius Namatianus), a vir illustris of higher social standing than the author.

== Metre and language ==
Although the text is printed as prose, the author was clearly trying to give the effect of the metres of Plautus. Sentences and phrases regularly end with the line endings of a trochaic septenarius or iambic senarius; and there is a tendency to trochaic sequences at the start of the next unit. In the middle however the metrical form of a Plautine verse is only occasionally preserved. The language used also has many reminiscences of early Latin comedy, both occasional archaisms and imitations or borrowings of whole phrases.

== Subject matter ==
=== Plot ===
The plot concerns the attempt by a pretended magician, Mandrogerus, to cheat the poor and grumpy Querolus of a treasure hidden in his house. Querolus’ father Euclio, dying abroad, had confided the location of the treasure to Mandrogerus. After Euclio’s death Mandrogerus was supposed to show Querolus the treasure and receive a half share as reward. Instead he tricks Querolus into allowing him to remove his ‘bad fortune’ from his house – the pot with the gold within it. On inspection, the pot seems to be a funerary urn, with only ashes inside it. Mandrogerus throws the pot back into Querolus’ house. It breaks and reveals the gold hidden within. When Mandrogerus learns of the gold, he returns and attempts to claim his share by his agreement with Euclio; but his own account leaves him with a choice of a charge of theft or sacrilege. Finally Querolus takes pity on him and allows him to remain as his dependent.

=== Dramatic technique ===
It seems unlikely that the author of the work was expecting it to be performed on stage in its original context. More probably it may have been read out as an entertainment at a banquet. But it is clear that the play is written to be performable within the conventions of ancient drama; and many aspects of dramatic technique, such as the preparation and motivation of entrances and exits, are carefully observed.

Many scenes are extended far beyond the demands of the plot for their own interest. The play opens with an extended discussion between Querolus and the household Lar, who, in the style of popular philosophy, compels Querolus to admit that his dissatisfaction with life is unjustified and that there is nothing that he can reasonably desire. Querolus’ slave, Pantomalus, has a long monologue complaining of his unreasonable master, which rather reveals his own idleness and dishonesty. Mandrogerus advises Querolus about the various occult powers from which one can seek aid, a scene mocking superstitious beliefs, but also, perhaps, covertly alluding to corrupt civil servants, whose favour must be sought with bribes.

=== Models ===
There are several similarities to Plautus’ Aulularia in the play: the grumpy character of Querolus; a pot of gold; the appearance of the Lar of his house and his role in leading Querolus to discover the gold; a theft. In addition the grumpy house owner in Plautus is called Euclio, the name of Querolus’ father; some see the work as a kind of sequel to Plautus’ play.

== Reception and modern editions ==
The play had some success in the Middle Ages and provided Vitalis of Blois in the twelfth century with the model for his own Aulularia. Since the renaissance, however, it has been largely neglected. One exception is the satirical novelist Thomas Love Peacock, who devoted an essay to it in his Horae Dramaticae of 1852.

The first printed edition is that of Pierre Daniel (Paris 1564). Only the most recent critical editions, Jacquemard-Le Saos (1994) and Brandenburg (2024) make use of an important witness, the seventeenth century copy of a lost manuscript from Reims. The ending of the work is missing (although evidently the plot is complete and very little text has been lost). In the manuscripts, it is followed without a break by the (also fragmentary) Lex convivalis, which some regard as a part of the play.
