= Gold Dust Twins =

Trademark for Fairbank's Gold Dust washing powder

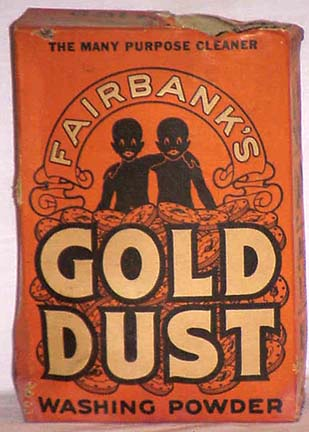
A box of Gold Dust Washing Soap featuring the iconic "Gold Dust Twins", 'Goldie' and 'Dustie'

The Gold Dust Twins, the trademark for Fairbank's Gold Dust washing powder products, appeared in printed media as early as 1892. "Goldie" and "Dusty", the original Gold Dust Twins, were often shown doing household chores together. In general use since the early 1900s, the term has had popular use as a nickname on several occasions. The sobriquet, "Gold Dust Twins," is often used to describe two talented individuals working closely together for a common goal, especially in sports.

== Background ==
Gold Dust washing powder was an all-purpose cleaning agent first introduced in the late 1880s by the Nathaniel Kellogg Fairbank Soap Company based in New York City. Gold Dust was distributed in America by the Lever Brothers Company of Cambridge, Massachusetts. Its first regional success was in the midwestern United States. Gold Dust Washing Powders had been marketed nationally since the mid-1890s, becoming the top-selling national brand of washing powder by 1903. Gold Dust products were eventually licensed and marketed internationally by Lever Brothers in Canada and Great Britain. The product lines' bright orange labels prominently featured the Gold Dust Twins.

== The original Gold Dust Twins ==
The Gold Dust Twins, "Goldie" and "Dustie" (sometimes spelled "Dusty"), were the faces of the Fairbank's Gold Dust washing powder product lines. The original version of the twins circa 1892 was a drawing of two young black children cheerfully cleaning up together in a washtub. On the original containers, they are simply pictured standing side-by-side over the "Gold Dust Washing Powder" wording and behind a mound of gold coins, while standing underneath an arch emblazoned with the name "Fairbank's."

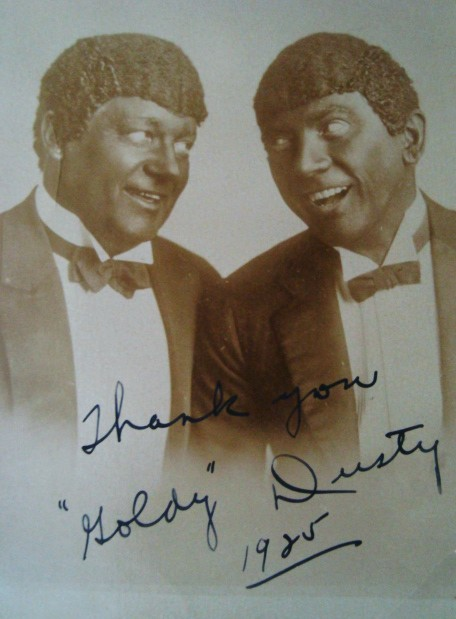
Harvey Hindemeyer and Earle Tuckerman in blackface as Goldie and Dusty, respectively, of the radio show fame

By the 1903 launch of a national advertising campaign, renderings of the twins had been transformed into a cartoonish pair of caricature, bald, black children of unspecified gender shown wearing tutus that sported the words "Gold" and "Dust" on them. On product containers and in advertisements, they were often comically depicted, along with a huge stack of dishes in a washtub, with one twin cleaning, the other drying. The twins became icons following a 1903 national marketing campaign, which featured the slogan "Let the Twins Do Your Work." They became an easily recognizable trademark found in many, if not most, U.S. homes during the first half of the twentieth century.

The Gold Dust Twins were drawn by E.W. Kemble, then a staff artist for The Daily Graphic. They were featured in print, billboard, specialty advertising, and radio advertisements for over sixty-five years. The Gold Dust Twins was the name of a popular radio program which was broadcast nationally in the U.S. in the 1920s. Starring Harvey Hindemeyer as "Goldie", and Earle Tuckerman as "Dusty," the show was sponsored by Lever Brothers and Gold Dust washing powder. An early example of product tie-ins, Gold Dust's advertising jingle became the show's theme song, sung by Hindemeyer and Tuckerman.

The products (along with Goldie and Dustie) were phased out by the mid-1950s, as national sensibilities regarding race—and the type of racial stereotypes embodied in the Twins characters—began to change.

== Other uses ==
=== People ===
Historically, the "Gold Dust Twins" moniker has most often been used to describe two individuals working closely together for a common goal, including:

Entertainers

- Tim Moore (later famous for his role of George "Kingfish" Stevens in the television version of Amos 'n' Andy), along with his stage-partners, Romeo Washburn and Cora Miskel, performed as part of the trio, "Cora and Her Gold Dust Twins," on the vaudeville circuit in the midwestern and the northeastern United States following the national popularization of the icons (early 1900s).

In government / politics

- Benjamin V. Cohen and Thomas Corcoran, government (1930s).
- Hugo Black and Bibb Graves, Alabama "gold passport" carrying Klansmen (1920s).

In sports

- Harold "Jug" McSpaden and Byron Nelson, golf (1930s and 1940s).
- Gus Mortson and Jim Thomson, Canadian hockey (1940s and early 1950s).
- Royal Copeland and Joe Krol, Canadian football (1940s and early 1950s).
- Lew Hoad and Ken Rosewall, tennis (1950s).
- Donny Anderson and Jim Grabowski, NFL football with the Green Bay Packers (1960s).
- Fred Lynn and Jim Rice, Boston Red Sox baseball (1970s).

Other

- Herman Sary and Leo Huck, two Catholic Carmelite brothers (circa 1898).
- Douglas Albert Munro and Raymond Evans, U.S. Coast Guardsmen awarded medals in World War II

=== In popular culture ===
- The Gold Dust Twins, a 1920s radio series sponsored by Gold Dust washing products
- Rafferty and the Gold Dust Twins, a 1975 comedy road movie; the Gold Dust Twins of the title being a pair of female hitchhikers
- The Twins appear in the 2004 release, C.S.A.: The Confederate States of America, an alternate reality American documentary about American life after the Confederates had won the American Civil War. A recreation of a Gold Dust Twins commercial, featuring purposely outrageous racial stereotypes, is shown as part of the "mockumentary."
- In "Washwoman's Blues" recorded August 8, 1928 and released as Columbia 146893, Bessie Smith has the line "Lord, I do more work than forty livin' Gold Dust Twins".
- In Chester Himes’s novel "A Rage in Harlem," Jackson, the central male character, and his twin brother, Goldy, had been nicknamed The Gold Dust Twins by “white people in the South.”

=== Products ===
A set of ham radio equipment was made by the Collins Radio Company in the 1950s that was nicknamed the "Gold Dust Twins" comprising the 75A-4 receiver and KWS-1 transmitter, which together at the time cost over $2500 ($30,000 in 2025 dollars) when new. Collins products were considered top-of-the-line. Ham radio enthusiasts nicknamed the pair the Gold Dust Twins, as they had not been affordable to most amateur radio enthusiasts when first introduced.
