= Old French law =

Law of the Kingdom of France before the French Revolution

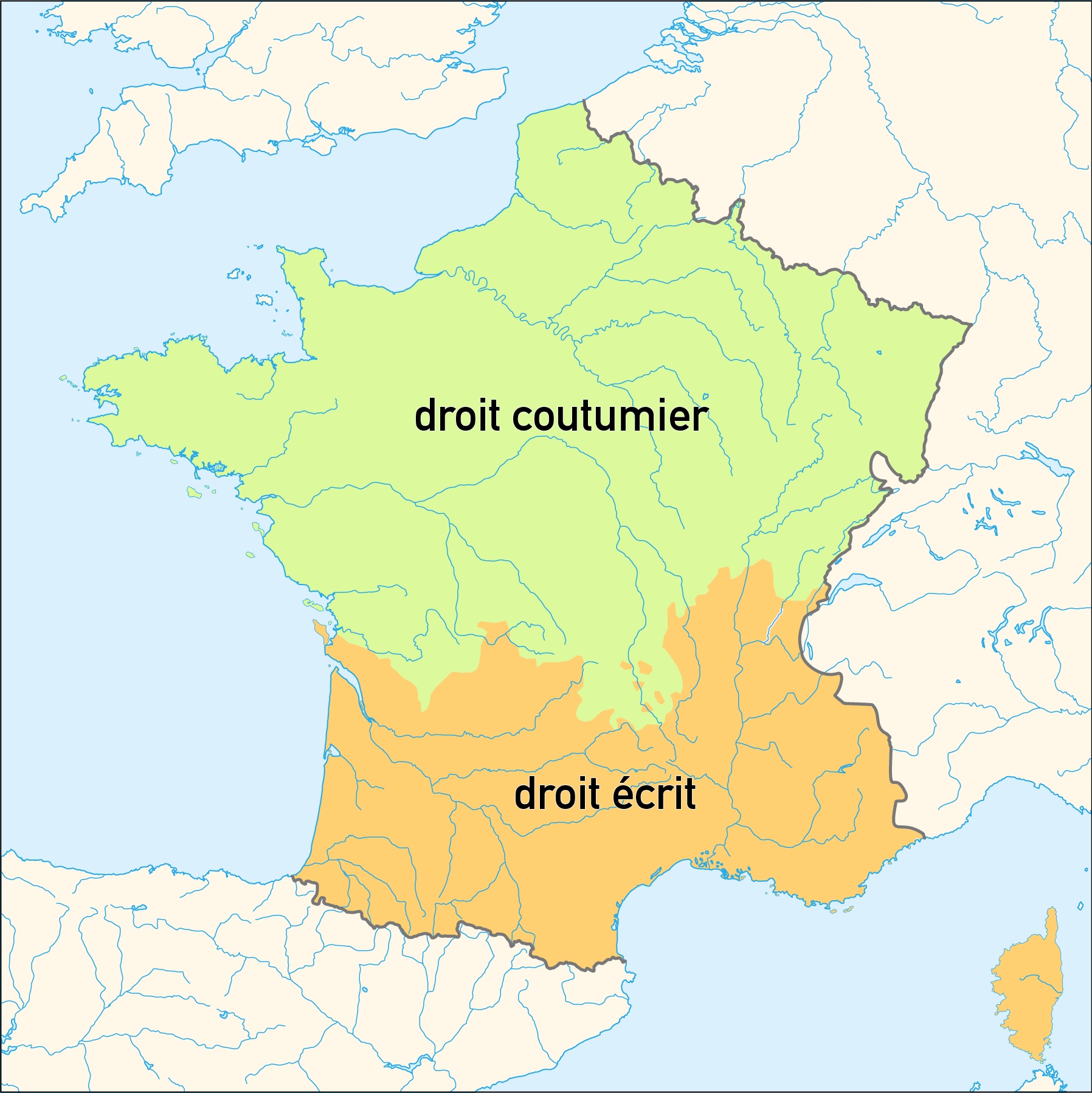
Zone of customary laws (droit coutumier) in the north and of written law (droit écrit) in the south, before the French Revolution

Old French law, referred to in French as l'Ancien Droit, was the law of the Kingdom of France until the French Revolution. In the north of France were the Pays de coutumes ('customary countries'), where customary laws were in force, while in the south were the Pays de droit écrit ('countries of written law'), where Roman law had been paramount. Roughly speaking, the line separating the two areas was the river Loire, from Geneva to the mouth of the Charente, although this was not a firm border between the two categories of law. As worded by George Mousourakis, "in both zones, the law in force also included elements derived from royal, feudal, and canonical sources."

== Pays de coutumes ==
In the north existed a variety of customs "with a Frankish-Germanic character."

In the tenth and eleventh centuries, as the Carolingians gave way to the Capetians, Frankish law broke up into many different systems, according to the territories, some extremely small, won by princes and prelates.

The coutumes were asserted and enforced under feudalism during the Middle Ages and in the early modern period by the French kings and their vassals, especially in the lands of the Île-de-France, to the exclusion of Roman law. A number of regional coutumes starting from the 13th century: e.g. the Coutumes de Beauvaisis, compiled by Phillipe de Remy. By the 16th century, the Coutume de Paris, first published in 1510, eventually extended to all of the Parlement of Paris' jurisdiction and beyond in cases of any alleged lacunae in the local customs. Antoine Loysel published a work of 958 legal maxims developed over a period of 40 years distilling the coutumes in his Institutes coutumières: Ou manuel de pluſieurs & diuerſes reigles, ſentences, & Prouerbes tant anciens que modernes du Droic‍t Couſtumier & plus ordinaire de la France, in 1607. Further development of customary law had been halted by the late 16th century.

For example, Claude de Ferrière commented that "community of goods" ("a partnership between married persons of all personal property, and of all real property acquired during the marriage state") prevailed "throughout all customary France, except Normandy, Rheims and Auvergne."

== Pays de droit écrit ==
George Mousourakis stated "after the revival of Roman law in the late eleventh and twelfth centuries and the spread of its study from Bologna to Montpellier and other parts of France, the Roman law of Justinian came to be accepted in southern France as the living law of the land", even though, as emphasized by Ernest Glasson, "coutumes did develop in those southern regions, and they often contradicted Roman law." "Prior to this, the pays de droit écrit in the south followed pre-Justinian Roman law, based primarily on the Code of Theodosius II (A.D. 438)", as reissued in the Alarician Breviary. As Antonio Padoa-Schioppa wrote,

When the monarchy was forced to take into account the reality in countries that had written laws, in order to avoid any potential subordination with respect to the [Holy Roman] Empire – of which Justinian Roman law was considered the expression – King Philip IV the Fair established in 1312, with an ordinance, that in the Pays de droit écrit Roman law was admitted, but only as a local custom, not as imperial law.

== Attempts to codify ==
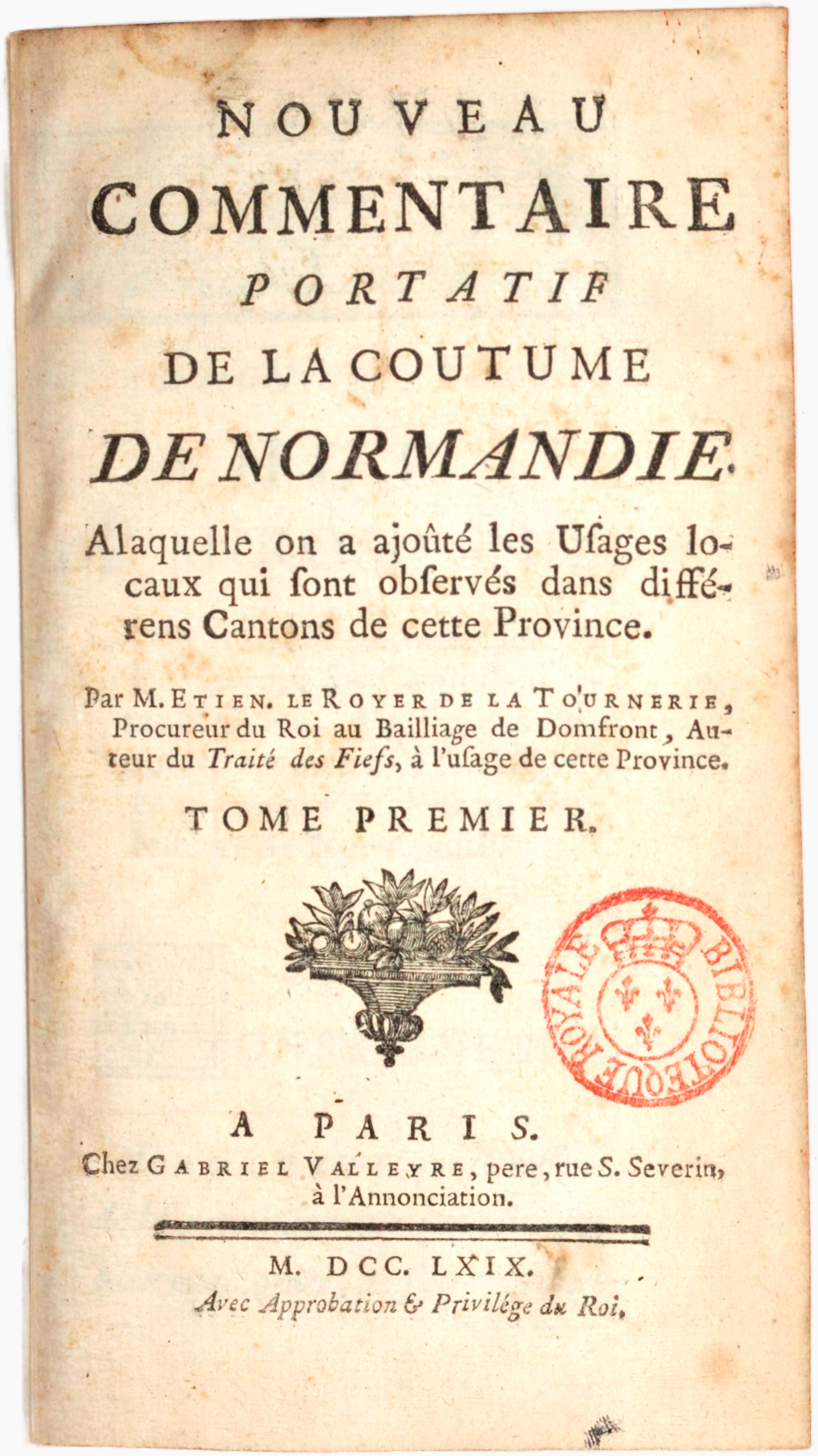
Cover of the 1778 Coutume de Normandie

Louis XI had formed the idea of using throughout his realm one custom, one weight, one measure. Henry III announced to the States of Blois his intention of resuming this design, and he caused a code of law to be prepared, and Louis XIII followed the same example. But these efforts were wholly lost. In the time of Louis XIV, under the direction of some of the celebrated jurists of his reign, the royal power of making laws for the whole realm was exercised, and some very admirable ordinances or statutes were enacted, but they only embraced a few isolated portions (or heads) of law. Under Louis XV, and particularly through the labours of D'Aguesseau, more royal ordinances were made; but these only remodelled detached morsels of the whole system, and the revolution in 1790 found France governed by nearly 300 systems of customary law.

In the 18th century, Voltaire declared that in travelling through France one changed the laws as often as one changed horses.

When the Napoleonic Code entered into force in 1804 all coutumes were abolished. However, French customary law was incorporated into the substance of the code.

== North America ==
In 1664, under the royal act creating the French East India Company, the Custom of Paris became the only law of the land in New France. In 1866 the Civil Code of Lower Canada was adopted in Lower Canada. The majority of the Code's rules borrowed heavily from the Custom of Paris.

== See also ==
- Fundamental laws of the Kingdom of France
- Legal history of France
