= Pierre Pithou =

French lawyer and scholar (1539-1596)

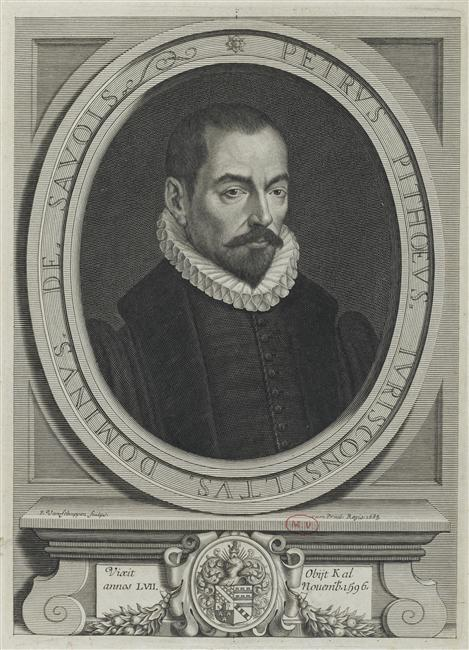
Pierre Pithou

Pierre Pithou (1 November 1539 – 1 November 1596) was a French lawyer and scholar. He is also known as Petrus Pithoeus.

== Life ==
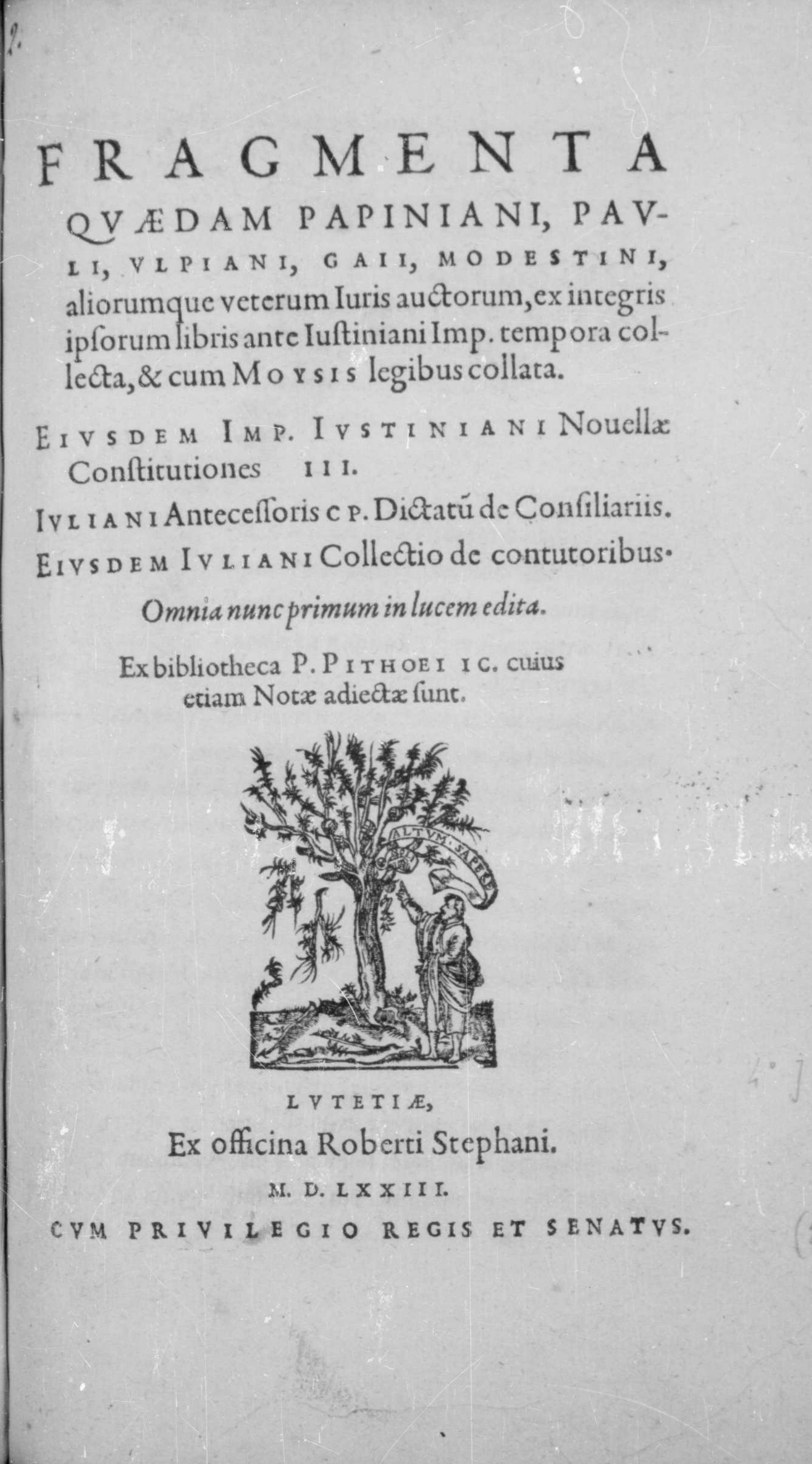
Fragmenta quaedam Papiniani, Pauli, Ulpiani, Gaii, Modestini, aliorumque veterum iuris auctorum, 1573

He was born at Troyes. From childhood he loved literature, and his father Pierre encouraged this interest. Young Pithou was called to the Paris bar in 1560. On the outbreak of the second war of religion in 1567, Pithou, who was a Calvinist, withdrew to Sedan, France and afterwards to Basel, returning to France on the publication of the edict of pacification. Soon afterwards he accompanied the duc de Montmorency on his embassy to England, returning shortly before the massacre of St Bartholomew, in which he narrowly escaped with his life. Next year he followed the example of the future Henry IV of France by abjuring the Protestant faith.

Shortly after his accession to the throne, Henry recognized Pithou's talents and services by giving him various legal appointments. He co-operated in publishing the Satire Ménippée (1593), which did much to damage the cause of the Catholic League; the harangue of the Sieur d'Aubray is usually attributed to Pithou.

Pithou wrote many legal and historical books, besides preparing editions of several ancient writers. His earliest publication was Adversariorum subsectorum lib. II. (1565). In 1569, he became the first to publish Landolfus Sagax' Historia Romana, and under the name by which it became better known: Historia Miscella. Perhaps his edition of the Leges Visigothorum (1579) was his most valuable contribution to historical science; in the same line he edited the Capitula of Charlemagne, Louis the Pious, and Charles the Bald in 1588; he assisted his brother François in preparing the Corpus juris canonici (1687).

Pierre's Libertés de l'église gallicane (1594) is reprinted in his Opera sacra juridica his orica miscellanea collecta (1609). In classical literature he was the first who made the world acquainted with the Fables of Phaedrus (1596).

Pithou contributed to the study of Livy, in collating a manuscript against the edition of Sigonius, and adding notes. It was not published, but has been cited as "Excerpta-", "Exc-" and "notulae Pithoei", and remains in the Bodleian Library, Oxford.

He died at Nogent-sur-Seine. His valuable library, specially rich in manuscripts, was for the most part transferred to what is now the Bibliothèque Nationale in Paris.

== Family ==
Three of Pierre Pithou's brothers acquired distinction as jurists: Nicolas, with his twin, Jean co-authored the treatise, Institution du mariage chrétien. François Pithou, the youngest, wrote Glossarium ad libros capitularium (1588) and Traité de l'excommunication et de l'interdit, etc. (1587).

== Works ==
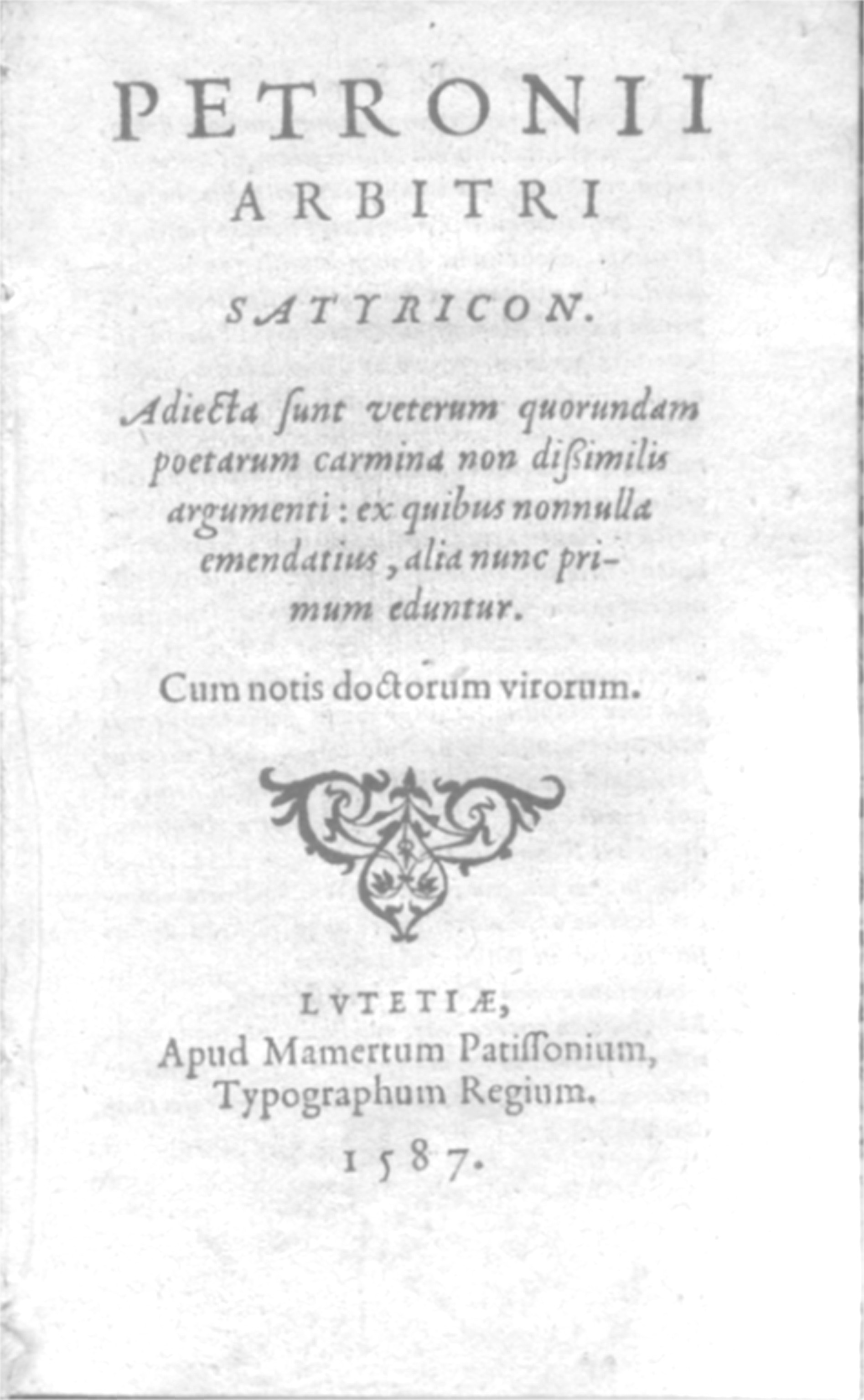
Satyricon, 1587

- Charlemagne empereur d'Occident.
- Généalogie des comtes héréditaires de Troyes et de Meaulx, ou de Champaigne et Brie, qui furent aussi Roys de Navarre.
- Bref recueil des évêques de Troyes. (Signé : P. Pithoeus... [1572].).
- Fragmenta quaedam Papiniani, Pauli, Ulpiani, Gaii, Modestini, aliorumque veterum iuris auctorum (in Latin). Paris: Robert Etienne. 1573.
- Satire Ménippée, 1593.
  - Satyre Ménippée : de la vertu du Catholicon d'Espagne et de la tenue des estats de Paris, Éd. Charles Labitte, Œuvres & Valsery, Ressouvenances, 1841; 1997 ISBN 978-2-90442-973-6.
  - Satyre Menippee de la Vertu du Catholicon d'Espagne et de la tenue des Estats de Paris, éd. critique de Martial Martin, Paris, H. Champion, 2007, « Textes de la Renaissance », n° 117, ISBN 978-2-74531-484-0.
