= Carlo Alessandro Guidi =

Italian poet (1650–1712)

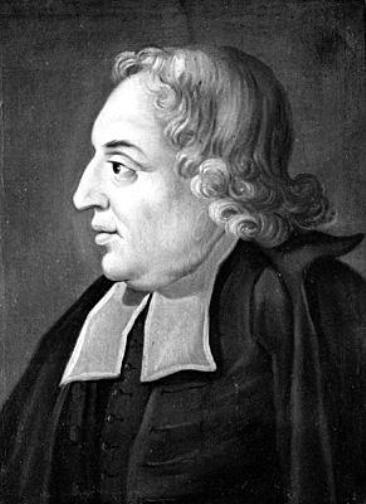
- Portrait of Carlo Alessandro Guidi, c. 1700
- Born: 14 June 1650; Pavia, Duchy of Milan
- Died: 12 June 1712 (aged 61); Frascati, Papal States
- Resting place: Sant'Onofrio, Rome
- Occupations: Poet; Intellectual; Playwright
- Title: abbot
- Parent(s): Bernardo Guidi and Maddalena Guidi (née Figarolla)
- Writing career
- Pen name: Erilo Cleoneo
- Language: Latin; Italian
- Literary movement: Baroque; Neoclassicism

Carlo Alessandro Guidi (14 June 1650 – 12 June 1712), Italian lyric poet, was born at Pavia.

== Biography ==
As chief founder of the well-known Roman Academy of the Arcadians, he had a considerable share in the reform of Italian poetry, which at that time was dominated by the baroque extravagance of the poets Giambattista Marino and Claudio Achillini and their school. Guidi, Giovanni Mario Crescimbeni, and the critic and jurisconsult Gravina attempted to foster a straightforward use of language.

While his early verse shows the influence of Marino, he later cultivated the Pindaric manner of Chiabrera, producing canzoni of free stanzaic form.

His most celebrated song was Alla Fortuna (To Fortune).

Guidi's poems were printed at Parma in 1671, and at Rome in 1704. In 1681 he published at Parma his lyric tragedy Amalasunta in Italia, and two pastoral dramas Daphne and Endymion.

Guidi's poetical version of the six homilies of Pope Clement XI, was severely criticized by the satirist Settano. An edition of this version had been printed in 1712, and the pope being then in Castel Gandolfo, Guidi went there to present him with a copy. On the way he found out a serious typographical error, which he took so much to heart that he was seized with a stroke at Frascati and died on the spot.

Guidi was honoured with the special protection of Ranuccio II, duke of Parma, and of Queen Christina of Sweden.

== Works ==
- Poesie liriche d'Alessandro Guidi consagrate all'Altessa Serenissima di Ranuccio II Farnese duca di Parma, e di Piacenza. In Parma: per li Viotti, 1671
- Il Giove d'Elide fulminato, introduzione al balletto fatto dalla serenissima signora duchessa di Parma l'anno 1677. Nel teatrino del serenissimo signor duca poesia d'Alessandro Guidi, posta in musica da d. Marco Uccellini maestro di capella della medesima altezza, Parma, 1677
- Amalasonta in Italia. Dramma d'Alessandro Guidi, posto in musica dal Maestro di cappella Gio: Battista Policci, e fatto rappresentare dal serenissimo signor duca di Parma nel Teatro del Collegio de' Nobili l'anno 1681. In Parma: per Galeazzo Rosati Stampator Ducale, 1681
- Amore riconciliato con Venere, introduzione al balletto fatto dalla serenissima signora duchessa di Parma l'anno 1681. nel Teatrino del serenissimo signor duca poesia d'Alessandro Guidi, posta in musica dal Maestro di cappella Gio: Battista Policci. In Parma: per Galeazzo Rosati Stampator Ducale, 1681
- Accademia per musica fatta nel real palazzo della maesta della regina Christina per festeggiare l'assonzione al trono di Giacomo secondo re d'Inghilterra, versi d'Alesandro Guidi. In Roma: nella stamperia della Reu. Cam. Apost., 1687
- L'Endimione di Erilo Cleoneo pastore arcade con un discorso di Bione Crateo all'eminentiss. e reverendiss. sig. cardinale Albano. In Amsterdam: appresso la vedoua Schippers, 1692
- Pensieri heroici, spiegati dalla penna d'Alessandro Guidi. Dedicati all'illustrissimo Nicolò Foscarini. In Venetia: appresso Alvise Pavin, 1695; In Parma: per Giuseppe Rossetti, 1695
- Poesie d'Alessandro Guidi non più raccolte, con la sua vita novamente scritta dal signor canonico Crescimbeni e con due ragionamenti di Vincenzo Gravina non più divulgati, Verona, G. A. Tumermani, 1726
- Le basiliche di S. Francesco d'Assisi e della Madonna degli Angeli, descritte da Alessandro Guidi, postovi innanzi un compendio della vita di esso serafico padre. Roma: Tip. poliglotta, 1873
