= Federigo Nomi =

Italian poet and translator

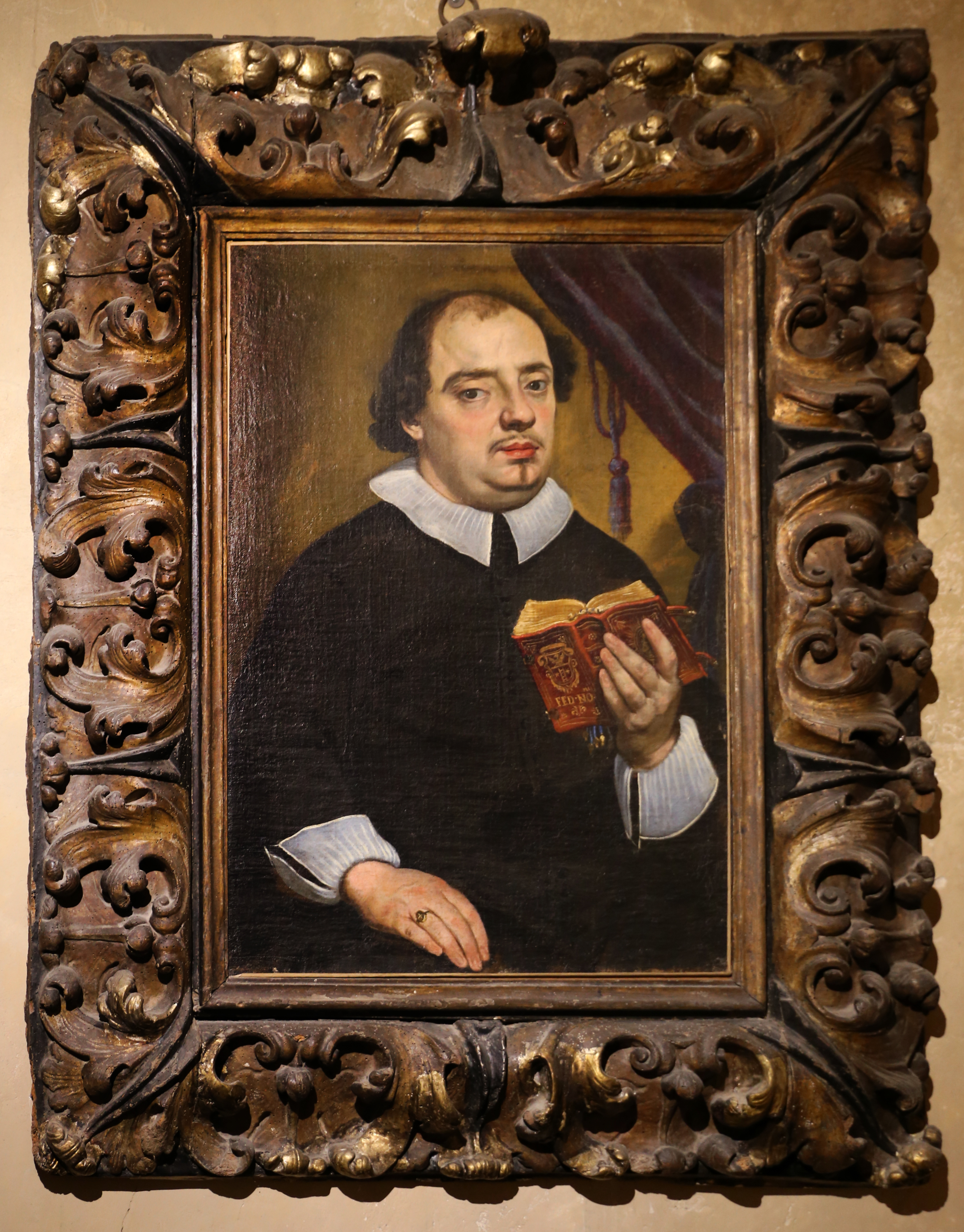
- Portrait of Federigo Nomi. Anghiari, Museo di Palazzo Taglieschi
- Born: 31 January 1633; Anghiari, Grand Duchy of Tuscany
- Died: 30 November 1705 (aged 72); Monterchi, Grand Duchy of Tuscany
- Education: University of Pisa
- Occupations: Poet; Classical scholar; Translator
- Known for: Italian translation of Horace
- Parent(s): Giovanni Battista Nomi and Ottavia Nomi (née Canicchi)
- Writing career
- Language: Latin, Italian
- Genres: Poetry; translation
- Movements: Baroque; Neoclassicism

Federigo Nomi (31 January 1633 – 30 November 1705) was an Italian poet and translator.

== Biography ==
Born in Anghiari in the Grand Duchy of Tuscany, Nomi lived most of his life in Arezzo. In 1656, he took holy orders. From 1674 to 1682, he taught feudal law at the University of Pisa. Later in his life he became a parish priest in the small town of Monterchi. He died in Monterchi on 30 November 1705, aged 72. A close friend of Francesco Redi and Antonio Magliabechi, Nomi was a member of the Academy of Arcadia, using the pseudonym ‘Cerifone Nedeatide’.

== Works ==
His major works were the epic poem Buda liberata (1703), modelled on Torquato Tasso's Jerusalem Delivered, and the mock-heroic poem Il catorcio d'Anghiari, written about 1684 in imitation of Alessandro Tassoni's La secchia rapita and published posthumously in 1830. Other works include neoclassic lyrics, religious poetry, Italian translations of Horace's Odes and Epodes, and a collection of Latin satires written in imitation of Juvenal and published in Leiden by Jakob Gronovius (1703). Nomi translated Francesco Redi's Esperienze intorno a diverse cose naturali into Latin.

== List of works ==
- Poesie Liriche. Perugia: Zecchini. 1666.
- I quattro libri delle poesie liriche di Orazio Flacco. Florence: all'insegna della Nave. 1672.
- Il libro degli Epodi di Orazio trasportato in Toscana favella. Florence: per Niccolò Navesi, al segno della Nave. 1675.
- Jakob Gronovius, ed. (1703). Liber satyrarum sexdecim (in Latin). Lugduni in Batavis: apud Jordanum Luchtmans.

== Bibliography ==
- Grassi, Liliana (2013). "NOMI, Federigo". Dizionario Biografico degli Italiani (in Italian). Vol. 78: Natta–Nurra. Rome: Institute of the Italian Encyclopaedia. ISBN 978-88-12-00032-6.
- Crescimbeni, Giovanni Mario (1720). Notizie Istoriche degli Arcadi Morti. Vol. 2. Rome: de Rossi. pp. 262–264.
- Bettazzi, Enrico (1912). "Appunti biografici e bibliografici intorno a Federigo Nomi". Scritti Varii in Onore di Rodolfo Renier. Turin: 697–702.
- Citroni, S. (1976). "Le satire latine di Federico Nomi e di Ludovico Sergardi: aspetti dell'eredità di Giovenale alla fine del '600". Studi Secenteschi. 17 (33): 33–60.
