= Orazio Filippo Bianchi =

Italian scholar

Orazio Filippo Bianchi (c. 1680 – 1757) was an Italian lawyer and classical scholar.

== Biography ==
Orazio Bianchi was born in Rome, Papal States, in the last quarter of the 17th century, and studied law under Giovanni Vincenzo Gravina, becoming a friend of Pietro Metastasio and a member of the Accademia dei Quirini.

He moved to Milan, where he practised law, at the same time teaching Greek and Latin at the Scuole Palatine.

His friendship with the publisher Filippo Argelati triggered a period of literary scholarship. By 1721, he was employed full-time as the principal proofreader for the Palatine Society, which had been formed to publish Muratori's Rerum Italicarum Scriptores. In 1722, he was asked by the Ambrosian librarian, Giuseppe Antonio Sassi, to compare manuscript versions of the Historia miscella of Paul the Deacon with current printed editions. For this, he spent many hours in the Ambrosian Library and chapter archives of Monza.

Bianchi then became involved in developing commentaries on the text of some of the chronicles printed in the early volumes, such as those of Jordanes, Eutropius, and Paul the Deacon. His enthusiasm for the task brought him into conflict with both the Ambrosian librarian, Giuseppe Antonio Sassi, and with Muratori himself, who found his commentaries too long-winded. However, his edition of Paul the Deacon's Historia Langobardorum is rich in detail and precise, and draws on contemporary Greek and Latin historians and has been praised by later editors.

Delays in the production process from 1733 led to Bianchi being put on half pay, so he found a role in the Duchy of Milan's administration, culminating in his appointment as secretary of the Royal Council. He practised as a lawyer, and eventually held the posts of Professor of Municipal Law, Auditor General of the armies of the emperor in Italy, and perpetual Podestà of Milan.

He continued to involve himself with literary scholarship, working with Argelati on his anthology of Latin poets, where he provided Italian translations of the poetry of Statius and of Claudian under the pseudonym Academico Quirino. He produced an edition of the works of Sigonius, including the first printed edition of the Historia ecclesiastica, the manuscript of which he had tracked down in Rome. He translated Miles gloriosus, Plautus’ longest comedy, into Italian verse stressed on the antepenult (Il Capitan Bravo).

He was incapacitated by a stroke in 1753. He died at the beginning of 1756. His wife and son were left in difficult financial straits by his death.

== Sources ==
- Argelati, Filippo (1767). Angelo Teodoro Villa (ed.). Biblioteca degli Volgarizzatori (in Italian). Vol. III. Milan.
- Claudianus, Claudius (1736). Raccolta di tutti gli antichi poeti latini colla loro versione nell'italiana favella (in Italian). Vol. 13. Milan.
- Mazzuchelli, Giammaria (1770). Scrittori d'Italia, II, 2, Brescia 1770, pp. 1160-1 [Italian writers] (in Italian). Vol. 2, Part 2. Brescia: Giambatista Bassini. p. 1160.
- Muratori, Lodovico Antonio, ed. (1723). Rerum Italicarum scriptores (in Latin). Vol. 1. Milan: Societatis Palatinae.
- Sigonius, Carolus (1734). Bianchi, Orazio Filippo (ed.). Historiae ecclesiasticae (in Latin). Milan: Historiae ecclesiasticae.
- Statius, Publius Papinius (1732). Raccolta di tutti gli antichi poeti latini colla loro versione nell'italiana favella (in Italian). Vol. 4. Milan.
- Vischi, Luigi (1880). "La Società Palatina di Milano". Archivo Storico Lombardo (in Italian) (Anno VII).
- Waitz, Georg, ed. (1878). Scriptores Rerum Langobardicarum et Italicarum. Monumenta Germaniae Historica (in Latin). Hannover. p. 45.
- Petrucci, Armando (1968). "BIANCHI, Orazio". Dizionario Biografico degli Italiani (in Italian). Vol. 10: Biagio–Boccaccio. Rome: Institute of the Italian Encyclopaedia. ISBN 978-88-12-00032-6.
