= Andrés Marcos Burriel =

Spanish Jesuit, historian and essayist

Andrés Marcos Burriel y López SJ (8 December 1719 – 19 June 1762) was a Spanish Jesuit historian, essayist, notable for editing Miguel Venegas' Empresas Apostólicas and publishing it using Venegas' name as Noticia de la California in 1757.

== Biography ==
Andrés Marcos Burriel was born in Buenache de Alarcón on 19 November 1719, the son of Miguel Burriel and Ana López de Gonzalo. He studied at the Colegio Imperial de Madrid before starting his noviciate in 1731. He was ordained in 1743 after studying rhetorics, philosophy and theology, becoming a grammar school teacher in Toledo.

In 1744, he suffered tuberculosis and was obliged to retire to Buenache de Alarcón, recovering his strength through relaxation and abstention from books. During his convalescence, in a moment when he felt in mortal danger, he made a vow to San Francisco Javier that if he got better he would serve the Indians of California as a missionary. The following Spring he recovered and became a teacher of philosophy in Madrid.

He did not attempt to leave to California immediately. First he continued his academic career, taking up the position of director of a seminary for the aristocracy in Madrid and the post of professor of philosophy for the Jesuit University of Alcalá. In 1749, Burriel received the summons to become a missionary among the people of the Baja California. Burriel started preparing for his voyage, but at the last moment he heard that he was not going to leave. His imminent departure was halted by Francisco de Rávago, who by royal decree named him director of an investigative commission into the ecclesiastical archives. About this disappointment he wrote the following to Juan Francisco Tompes on 3 June 1750:

I am almost completely persuaded, that this strange reprisal that has been done to me, while walking to the port, destined to the Province of Mexico, and wishing to bury myself among the Californians, was the work of God, such that the people of the Indies have in me an agent wishing the universal good of the Indies.

—

The mission of the investigative commission was, with a group of historians including the influential Francisco Pérez Bayer, to critically edit all the documents in the church archives, reorder them and at the same time purge from the archives all documents related to the rights of the Crown over the Roman Curia. With this goal he traveled extensively between 1749 and 1756 during which he collected more than 10.000 documents. However, after Richard Wall became prime minister, Burriel was ordered to return all the documents he had collected. Not finished with his work, Burriel delayed until in 1756 all of his documents were seized and brought to the Biblioteca Nacional de España in Madrid.

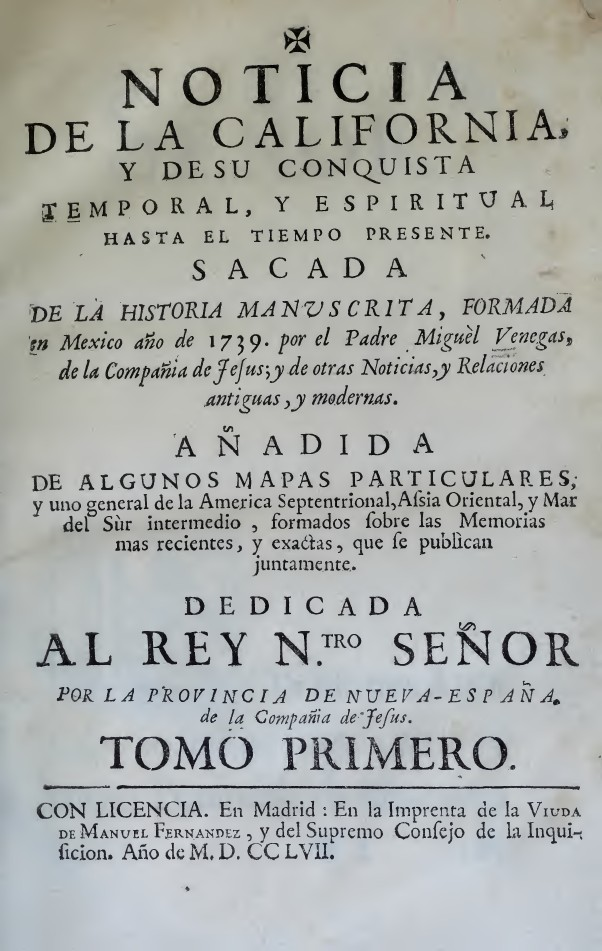
Title page of Noticia de la California by Miguel Venegas, edited by Andrés Marcos Burriel.

In 1754, Pedro Ignacio de Altamirano commissioned Burriel to re-elaborate the Empresas Apostólicas by Miguel Venegas, a project which took him two years and in which he reordered and expanded the original manuscript, reducing the role of the supernatural and bringing it in line with contemporary standards of natural history. On 1 April 1757 the book was published under Venegas' name in Madrid, and then translated to English (London, 1759), French (Paris, 1767) and other languages.

== Burriel and the Spanish Enlightenment ==
Andrés Marcos Burriel is considered to be a key figure of the Spanish Enlightenment. He maintained an active correspondence with the Valencian writer Gregorio Mayans y Siscar, whom he considered a great friend. Apart from the Noticia de la California, Burriel wrote the Paleografía española (1756), Memorias para la vida del santo rey don Fernando III (1762) and the Informe de la imperial ciudad de Toledo (1758). In the dispute surrounding Lorenzo Boturini's depiction of a glorious Amerindian past wiped out by Spanish colonialism, Burriel (along with Mayans) initially supported the Italian and attempted to secure a him a salary at the court.

== Works by Burriel ==
- Paleografía española, 1756
- Informe de la imperial ciudad de Toledo al Real y Supremo Consejo de Castillasobre igualación de pesos y medidas, 1758
- Noticia de la California, 1757
- Memorias de San Fernando III, 1762.
