= Giacomo Maria Paitoni =

Italian scholar

- Born: Giacomo Costantino Paitoni; October 11, 1708; Venice, Republic of Venice
- Died: 30 October 1774 (aged 66); Zero Branco, Republic of Venice
- Occupations: Christian monk; Philologist; Bibliographer
- Parent(s): Bortolomio Paitoni and Francesca Paitoni (née Santinelli)

Academic work
- Notable works: Biblioteca degli Autori Antichi Greci e Latini Volgarizzati
- Influenced: Filippo Argelati

Giacomo Maria Paitoni (11 October 1708 – 30 October 1774) was a Venetian monk, philologist and bibliographer. His reputation is founded on an accurate work entitled Biblioteca degli Autori Antichi Greci e Latini Volgarizzati (Library of Ancient Greek and Latin Authors), 5 vols., Venice, 1766-74.

== Biography ==
Giacomo Costantino Paitoni was born in Venice in 1708. He joined the Somaschi Fathers in 1725, taking the name of Giacomo Maria, and became librarian of their house. His minor publications, aside from some translations, the most notable of which is that of Cicero's Laelius de Amicitia, are mainly based on the rich collection of fifteenth-century books which they possessed. His last work was the Dissertazione sopra il vaso antico, chiamato Cotone (Dissertation on the ancient vase called Cotone), a commentary on a passage of Plutarch's Life of Lycurgus published in the Nuova Raccolta d’opuscoli scientifici e filologici (XX-XII [1770], pp. 1–21). Paitoni died in Zero Branco in 1774.

== Works ==
Filippo Argelati's Biblioteca degli Volgarizzatori had not yet been published when the similar but better work of Paitoni began to appear: Biblioteca degli Autori Antichi Greci e Latini Volgarizzati. Argelati's editor hastened to bring out his work, making some additions, and declaring that Paitoni had determined not to go on. Paitoni, however, resumed his task, and published the last volume of his Biblioteca in Venice in 1774. Argelati's Biblioteca degli Autori Antichi Greci e Latini Volgarizzati was published in 1766-1767 after the author's death, with additions by Angelo Teodoro Villa.

Besides the writings already mentioned, Paitoni realized an Italian translation of Diophantus' Arithmetica, published in Giovanni Francesco Crivelli's Elementi di fisica (Venice, 1744).

== Bibliography ==
- Boccardo, Gerolamo (1884). "Paitoni, Giacomo Maria". Nuova Enciclopedia italiana. Vol. XVI. Turin: UTET. p. 433.
- Dandolo, Girolamo (1855). La caduta della repubblica di Venezia ed i suoi ultimi cinquant'anni: studii storici. Vol. 1. Venice: Naratovich. pp. 330–331.
- Mandelli, Vittorio (2014). "PAITONI, Iacopo Maria". Dizionario Biografico degli Italiani (in Italian). Vol. 80: Ottone–Pansa. Rome: Istituto dell'Enciclopedia Italiana. ISBN 978-88-12-00032-6.
