= Pedro Alonso O'Crouley =

Catholic of Irish Descent

Pedro Alonso O'Crouley or O'Crowley (born 21 February 1740, died 8 February 1817, Cadiz, Spain) was one of many Catholics of Irish descent whose relatives immigrated to Spain. O'Crouley is most notable for his 1774 travel narrative of New Spain, Idea compendiosa del Reyno de Nueva España published in English as A Description of the Kingdom of New Spain by Sr. Dn. Pedro Alonso O'Crouley 1774. translated and edited by Seán Galvin in 1972.

== Life ==
His father, Dermot O'Crowley of county Cork, and mother, Mary O'Donnell of Ballymurphy, county Clare, emigrated from Ireland ca. 1731 to the port city of Cadiz, Spain, where O'Crouley was born. O'Crouley married fellow Cadiz Irish-Spanish resident Maria Power y Gil (1764-1805) when he was 44, and the couple had nine children. Their house in Cadiz still stands, with the family coat of arms above the doorway.

O'Crouley became a merchant, spending a decade going between Cadiz and Mexico, starting in 1764. He accumulated wealth that allowed him to become a collector of art and antiquities. He had a collection of Greek and Roman coins, hundreds of paintings, including works by masters Van Dyck, Rubens, Murillo, Velázquez, Zurbarán, and Ribera. While in Mexico, he collected geological specimens. He was a learned man of the era of the Spanish Enlightenment, who became a member of the Spanish Real Academia de Historia, Real Sociedad Vascongada, Real Sociedad Económica Matritense for the improvement agriculture and use of machinery. As with many learned men of the era, he was a corresponding member of other learned societies, in his case the Society of Antiquaries of Edinburgh. He also was a member of the Santa Hermandad in the city of Toledo. Prior to his writing his narrative of travels in New Spain, he read published works on Mexican, including Antonio de Solís, Antonio de Herrera, José de Acosta, Miguel Venegas, and Benno Ducrué.

== A Description of the Kingdom of New Spain, 1774 ==
O'Crouley's description of New Spain in the eighteenth century is a valuable contribution to scholarship, mostly unknown until the late twentieth century when it was published. The original manuscript comprises 202 leaves bound in red leather in the Biblioteca Nacional de Madrid, Ms. 972.02. It was published in English in 1972, as A Description of the Kingdom of New Spain by Sr. Dn. Pedro Alonso O'Crouley 1774. Once published, it was widely reviewed in the scholarly literature. In 1975, it was published in a facsimile edition. For the English edition, the translator Galvin rearranged some of the text to produce a more readable work. One scholar criticized this, saying "This is a disservice to the text, since part of its overall significance as an 'enlightened' compendium resides precisely in its structure as a miscellany."

The volume is richly illustrated. He drew native plants and flowers (cacao, vanilla, avocado, sapote, mamey, passion flower, and pricky pear cactus) as well as animals not known in Europe. What has gained most attention are his depictions of race mixture (castas), which have been published in works on that topic. O'Crouley provides written text for the illustrations, which were likely copies of existing casta groupings. He devotes an entire section of text to the condition of the Indians, lamenting their current state. Unlike many casta paintings that show scenes of imagined everyday life of the racial types, O'Crouley's lack any further context.

He wrote short descriptions of New Spain's principal cities, the capital Mexico City, the second largest city Puebla; Valladolid (now Morelia); Oaxaca; Guadalajara; Durango; Acapulco; and Veracruz. He travelled north to presidios of Los Adáes, in Texas; El Paso del Norte; and the province of Nayarit. His description of New Mexico is considerably longer than the places coming before it. Also lengthy is the chapter on his voyage up the Gulf of California; his description of California itself; and an expedition to Nueva Andalucía (Sinaloa and Sonora).

== Honors ==
The municipality of Cadiz commissioned a posthumous portrait of O'Crouley in 1855, which still hangs in the city hall. A street in Cadiz is named for him.
