= Filippo Argelati =

Italian historian (1685–1755)

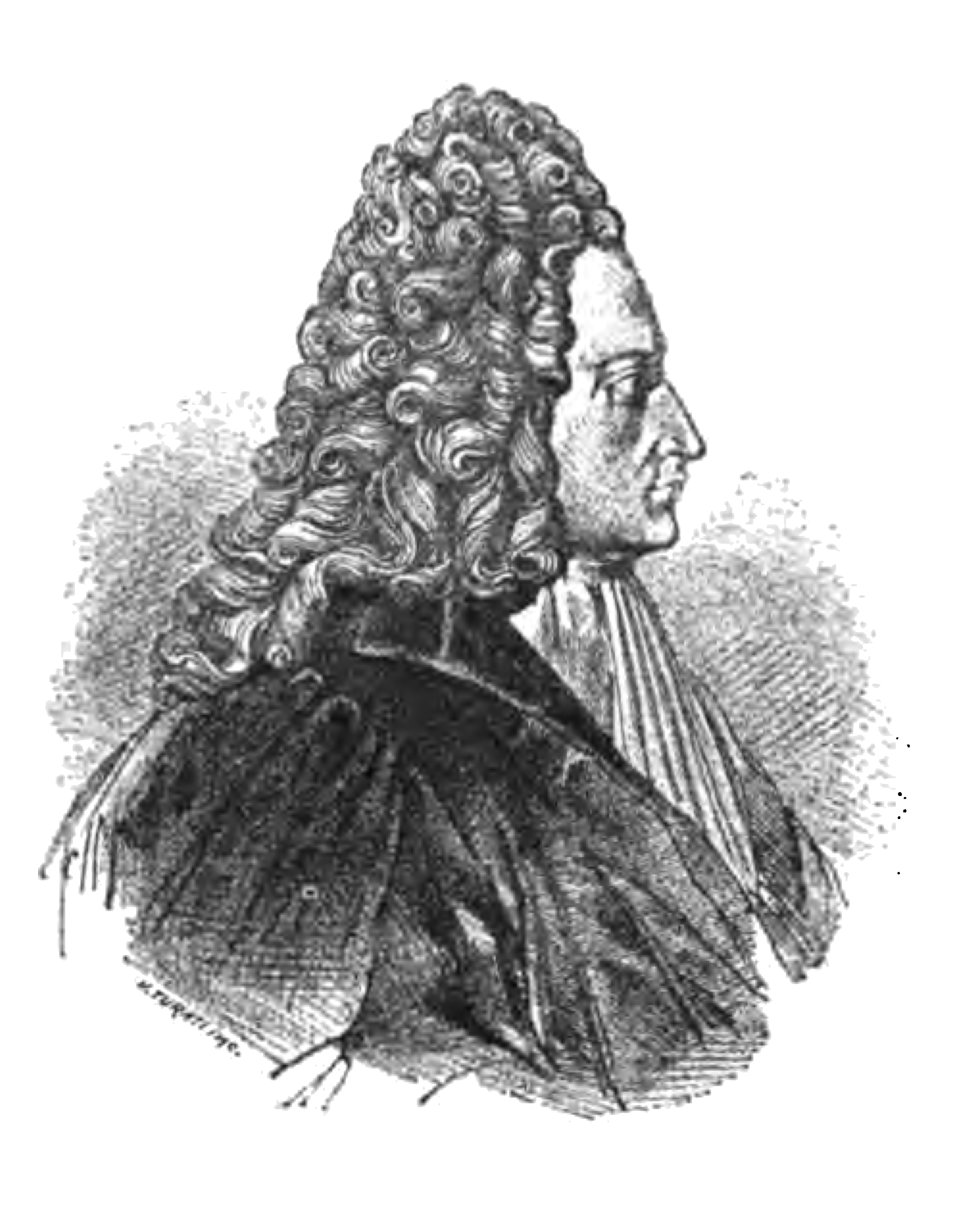
- Portrait of Filippo Argelati
- Born: December 1685; Bologna, Papal States
- Died: 25 January 1755 (aged 69); Milan, Duchy of Milan
- Other name: Dioneo Termeonio
- Occupation: Historian

Filippo Argelati (December 1685 – 25 January 1755) was an Italian historian and prolific editor, notable as a leading scholar of his age.

== Biography ==
Filippo Argelati was born at Bologna, where his early studies were superintended by Bonaventura Rossi, and he was afterwards placed under the care of the Jesuits. In the year 1705 he visited Florence and other cities in Italy, and in 1706 was about to proceed to France, when the death of an uncle recalled him to his native city. He had previously contemplated the publication of some important works, and now proposed to carry his design into effect. He turned his attention, in the first instance, towards an edition of the published and unpublished works of Ulisse Aldrovandi, and for this purpose procured the co-operation of some of the professors of Bologna for the different branches of natural history, and had made further progress in the necessary arrangements when the successive deaths of those who were to co-operate with him in the editorship forced him to abandon the project.

He subsequently devoted himself from the first to editing works of literature. The notice of him given by Giammaria Mazzucchelli was furnished to that writer by himself, and has been copied by Giovanni Fantuzzi and all subsequent writers. In 1715 he published Raccolta delle Rime del Sig. Carlantonio Bedori, 4º, which he dedicated to Count Angiolo Sacco, the author of the life of Bedori, prefixed to the work. His next and most important undertaking was in editing and publishing Muratori's multivolume opus, entitled Rerum italicarum scriptores. Muratori informed Argelati that he could not find a printing office for his work. Argelati traveled to Milan, and explained this problem and the work to Count Carlo Archinto, a prominent patron of the arts. Archinto, in order to raise the necessary funds, formed a society of Milanese noblemen under the name of Società Palatina, each of whom subscribed a considerable sum. By these means Argelati was able to complete first production of the work in twenty-five volumes folio. He appears to have taken an active part in the preparation of this work, furnishing notices and collecting manuscripts. After the publication of the first volume in 1723, dedicated to the Emperor Charles VI, that monarch assigned him a pension of three hundred ducats, with the honorary title of his Secretary.

In 1726, he published the Effemeridi of Eustachio Manfredi at Bologna, in two vols 4º; the Lettere critiche e poetiche di P. F. Bottazzoni, Milan, 1733, 4º, two works by the celebrated Orsi, viz., De Absolutione Capitalium Criminum, Milan, 1730, 4º, and De Invocatione Spiritus Sancti, Milan, 1731, 4º. In 1732 he commenced the re-publication of the works of Carolus Sigonius, in six volumes folio, which he printed in Ædibus Palatinis, that is, at the press of the Società Palatina : the last volume appeared in 1738. The first volume was dedicated to the Emperor Charles VI, who in return added another annual three ducats to the pension previously granted to the editor.

He re-published with the Abbé Biacca, at Milan, in 1730, in-fol. the Medaglie Imperatorie of Francesco Mezzabarba Birago, with the addition of others from the Farnese Museum, and various notices drawn from the manuscripts of the author; also the treatise De Antiquis Mediolani Ædificiis of Pietro Grazioli, 1736, folio; the first edition of the Neutonianismo per le Dame by the Count Francesco Algarotti, 1737, 4º; the Lettere Polemiche of Benedetto Bacchini, 1738, 4º; the Thesaurus Novus Veterum Inscriptionum of Muratori, 1739, fol.; the Storia di Trino of Giovanni Andrea Irico, 1745, 4º; the Rime of Francesco Lorenzini, 1746, 8º; De Antiquis Ecclesiæ Ritibus, by Edmond Martène; several collections of poetry and other works. To what extent Argelati was concerned in the publication of the works mentioned above is not clear. Fantuzzi states that “he showed great zeal for the honour of Italy in thus publishing the works of her litterati, to which, perhaps, he may have been further stimulated by the traffic in books with which he occupied himself”; and in the Giornale de’ Letterati, quoted by Fantuzzi, he is distinctly called Mercatante Libraro. He appears also to have been the director of the press of the Palatine Society, the founder of which, Carlo Archinto, he calls his Mecænas. It is, therefore, not easy to say whether his connection with many of these works was as whole or joint editor or as publisher.

== Works ==
In addition to these re-publications, Argelati was the author of the following works :

- Bibliotheca Scriptorum Mediolanensium; seu Acta et Elogia Virorum omnigena Eruditione illustrium, &c.; Præmittitur J. A. Saxii Historia Typographica Mediolanensis, two vols., Milan, 1745, fol. The authorship of this work was attributed to Giovanni Andrea Irico by the Giornale de’ Letterati and Argelati was accused of plagiarism. In a letter, however, published by him September 22d, 1746, he denies the charge, and Fantuzzi states that the Acta Eruditorum, quoted by the journalist as an authority for the accusation, makes no mention of any such plagiarism.
- De Monetis Italiæ variorum illustrium Virorum Dissertationes P. Argelati collegit, recensuit, auxit, nec non Indicibus exornavit, six vols., Milan, 1750–59, 4º.
- Animadversiones in Opera Caroli Sigonii, published in the edition of Sigonius mentioned above.
- The dedicatory epistles to all the volumes of the Scriptores Rerum Italicarum.
- The lives of all the poets whose works are inserted in the Corpus omnium veterum Poetarum Latinorum, cum Versione Italica, thirty-five vols., Milan, 1731–65, 4º, edited by him in conjunction with J. R. Malatesta.
- Rimario; ossia Raccolta di Rime sdrucciole, Milan, 1753, 4º.
- Risposta dell’Amico alla Lettera di ***, Milan, 1730. This was a reply to an anonymous publication, entitled Lettera ad un Amico, which appeared at Florence in 1730, directed against the Cronaca de’ tre Villani, comprised in vols. XII and XIV of Muratori’s collection.
- Biblioteca degli Volgarizzatori, osia Notizia dell’Opere Volgarizzate d’Autori che scrissero in Lingua morte prima del Secolo XV. Posthumous work with additions and corrections by Angelo Teodoro Villa, five tomes, Milan, 1767, 4º. In the preparation of this work Argelati was assisted by Giacomo Maria Paitoni and Antonio Maria Biscioni.

Argelati died at Milan on 25 January 1755. His labours were highly serviceable to the cause of Italian literature : they display great intelligence, indefatigable industry, very considerable reading, and much bibliographical knowledge. He was a member of several academies; of the Affidati of Pavia; the Arcadi of Rome, with the name of Dioneo Termeonio; the Gelati of Bologna, and of the Società Colombaria of Florence. The only additional fact recorded of him is that in 1717, being one of the tribunes the people, he delivered a discourse to his successors upon the various points concerning them, which gave so much satisfaction that it was ordered to be inscribed among their acts.

== Bibliography ==
- The Biographical Dictionary of the Society for the Diffusion of Useful Knowledge. Vol. 3. Longman, Brown, Green, and Longmans. 1843. pp. 360–362.
- Zicàri, Italo (1962). "ARGELATI, Filippo". Dizionario Biografico degli Italiani (in Italian). Vol. 4: Arconati–Bacaredda. Rome: Institute of the Italian Encyclopaedia. OCLC 883370.
- De Tipaldo, Emilio Amedeo. Biografia degli Italiani Illustri del sec. XVIII. Vol. VII. pp. 387–390.
- Lombardi, Antonio. Storia della Letteratura Italiana nel Secolo XVIII. Vol. III. pp. 107–109.
