= Manuel Martí =

Spanish humanist scholar (1663–1737)

Reverend Manuel Martí
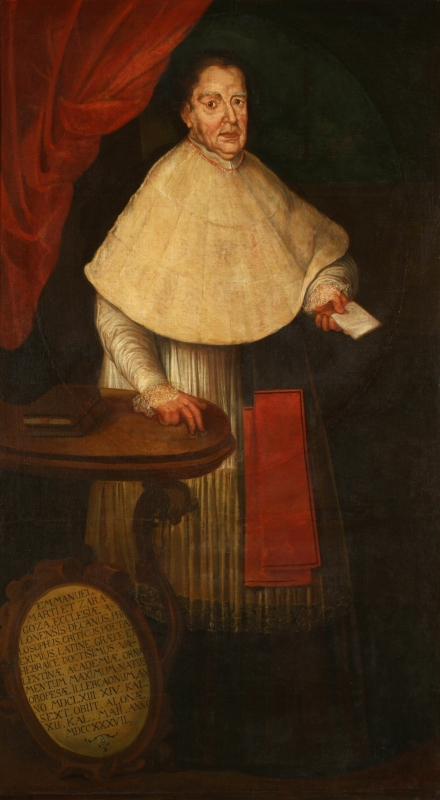
- Portrait of Manuel Martí y Zaragoza attributed to José Vergara Gimeno. Oil on canvas, 199 x 112 cm, Universidad de Valencia, Paraninfo
- Born: 19 July 1663; Oropesa del Mar, Spanish Empire
- Died: 21 April 1737 (aged 73); Alicante, Spanish Empire
- Occupations: Catholic priest; Translator; Archaeologist; Philologist
- Parent(s): José Martí and María Martí (née Zaragoza)

Academic background
- Education: University of Valencia; Sapienza University of Rome
- Influences: Juan Luis Vives; Francisco Sánchez de las Brozas; Giovanni Vincenzo Gravina

Academic work
- Discipline: Classical scholar

Manuel Martí (19 July 1663 – 21 April 1737) was a Spanish humanist scholar. Born near Valencia in 1663, he published a collection of poems, entitled Amalthea Geographica, and made several translations from the Latin. He died in Alicante in 1737.

Juan José Eguiara y Eguren published his Biblioteca Mexicana in response to the text of Martí, which denigrated the attainments of the men of letters of the New World in his "epistolas latinas" printed in Madrid in 1735.

== Biography ==
Martí studied Grammar in Castellón under the humanist Miguel Falcó, an admirer of Juan Luis Vives and Francisco Sánchez de las Brozas; in 1676 he began to study Philosophy and, later, Theology at the University of Valencia.

In 1686 he moved to Rome where he published the Latin poem Sylva de Tiberis alluvione (1688) and devoted himself to the study of Classical Greek. He entered the service of Cardinal José Saenz d'Aguirre and wrote a series of Latin poems that remained unpublished. From 1693 to 1694 Sáenz d'Aguirre published in Rome his Collectio Maxima Conciliorum omnium Hispaniae et novi orbis on which Martí had worked; he performed some scholarly and philological works, notably Notae in Theocritum. In 1694 he published the Satyromastix, a vicious attack against Monsignor Lodovico Sergardi who, under the pseudonym of Q. Sectano, had written a collection of Latin Satires against Giovanni Vincenzo Gravina. Martí became a member of the Academy of Arcadia and of the Academy of the Infecondi. In 1696 he edited in Rome the Bibliotheca Hispana Vetus of Nicolás Antonio. In the same year he graduated "in utroque iure" at the Sapienza University of Rome.

In December 1696 he moved to Alicante where in January 1697 he was ordained a priest. In 1699 he moved to Valencia, where he was appointed coadjutor bishop with right of succession. In 1704 he established himself at Madrid where he entered the service of the Duke of Medinaceli; in 1707 he began a correspondence with the Marquis de Mondéjar and in 1708 with Juan Interián de Ayala, one of the founders of the Royal Spanish Academy. Between 1711 and 1715 he traveled through Andalusia and carried out excavations in Italy.

In 1715 he returned to Madrid, where Guillaume Daubenton, the French confessor of king Philip V, rejected his candidacy for royal librarian. In 1716 he moved to Alicante, where he befriended Felipe Bolifon, a Neapolitan friend of Gravina and of Montfaucon. In May 1717 he embarked for Rome where in 1718 he wrote his Apaterosis. He attended Gravina on his deathbed. In December he returned to Spain and settled definitely in Alicante. On 2 December 1720 he began a correspondence with Gregorio Mayans who, in 1722, edited Martí's Apasterosis; in 1726 Martí sold his library. In 1730 he began a correspondence with Otto Mencke and the editors of Acta eruditorum of Leipzig. In 1735 he published in Madrid the Epistolarum Libri duodecim. Marti died in Alicante on 21 April 1737, and the following year the second edition of his Epistolarum libri duodecim was published in Amsterdam.

== Works ==
- De Alluvione Tyberis Sylva, Rome, 1688.
- Notae in Theocritum.
- Satyromastix.
- Apasterosis, Madrid, 1722.
- Epistolarum Libri duodecim, Madrid, 1735, second edition, Amsterdam, 1738.
- Pro crepitu ventris, Madrid, 1737.
