= Archinto family =

Coat of Arms of the Archinto Family

The Archinto family was a 14th through 18th century Italian noble family, residing in Milan. The family held significant wealth and influence in the city.

== History ==
The family can trace its beginnings to the 14th or 15th century, however they possibly can trace their lineage even further, to the 11th and 12th century. They possibly came from the kings of Lombardy. Arriving in Milan from Mariano, Brianza, they quickly became rich and influential. They then gained land and large sums of money from trade.

The family was a patron of the arts.

During the 15th century, the family was split in branches through the four sons of Giuseppe Archinto: Giovanni Ambrogio, Giovanni Stefano, Bartolomeo, and Cristoforo. Decades later, the family thinned, only surviving through Cristoforo's branch. Cristoforo's two grandsons, Carlo and Orazio, had begun two branches: Tainate and Barate. When the Barate branch went extinct around 1740, the Tainate branch was left by itself and is the only surviving branch today.

The family is most known for the Palazzo Archinto. The Palazzo was owned by the family for more than a hundred years, until it was sold, along with the artworks inside after Giuseppe Archinto had left the family in financial ruin.

== Important members ==
The family had many important members. They were:

- Filippo Archinto, apostolic vicar of the city of Rome and Archbishop of Milan
- Filippo, Bishop of Como
- Aurelio, Bishop of Como
- Romolo, Bishop of Novara
- Giuseppe Archinto, apostolic legate in Italy and Madrid and finally Archbishop of Milan
- Gerolamo, Archbishop of Tarsus and apostolic legate in Cologne and Poland
- Carlo, lieutenant and vicar of the Provision of the city of Milan, decurion of the General Council of Sixty, Captain of Justice in Milan, received the Order of the Golden Fleece by Philip of Spain, Emperor Leopold's chamberlain, Grandee of Spain by Charles of Spain, first Count of Tainate and head of the Tainate branch as son of Cristoforo
- Ottavio, decurion of the General Council of Sixty, first Count of Barate and head of the Barate branch as son of Orazio.
- Giuseppe, quaestor, jurist and representative of the city's best magistracies, senator of the state with a position of trust from the Habsburg rulers
