= Lodovico Sergardi =

Italian Roman Catholic priest and poet (1660–1726)

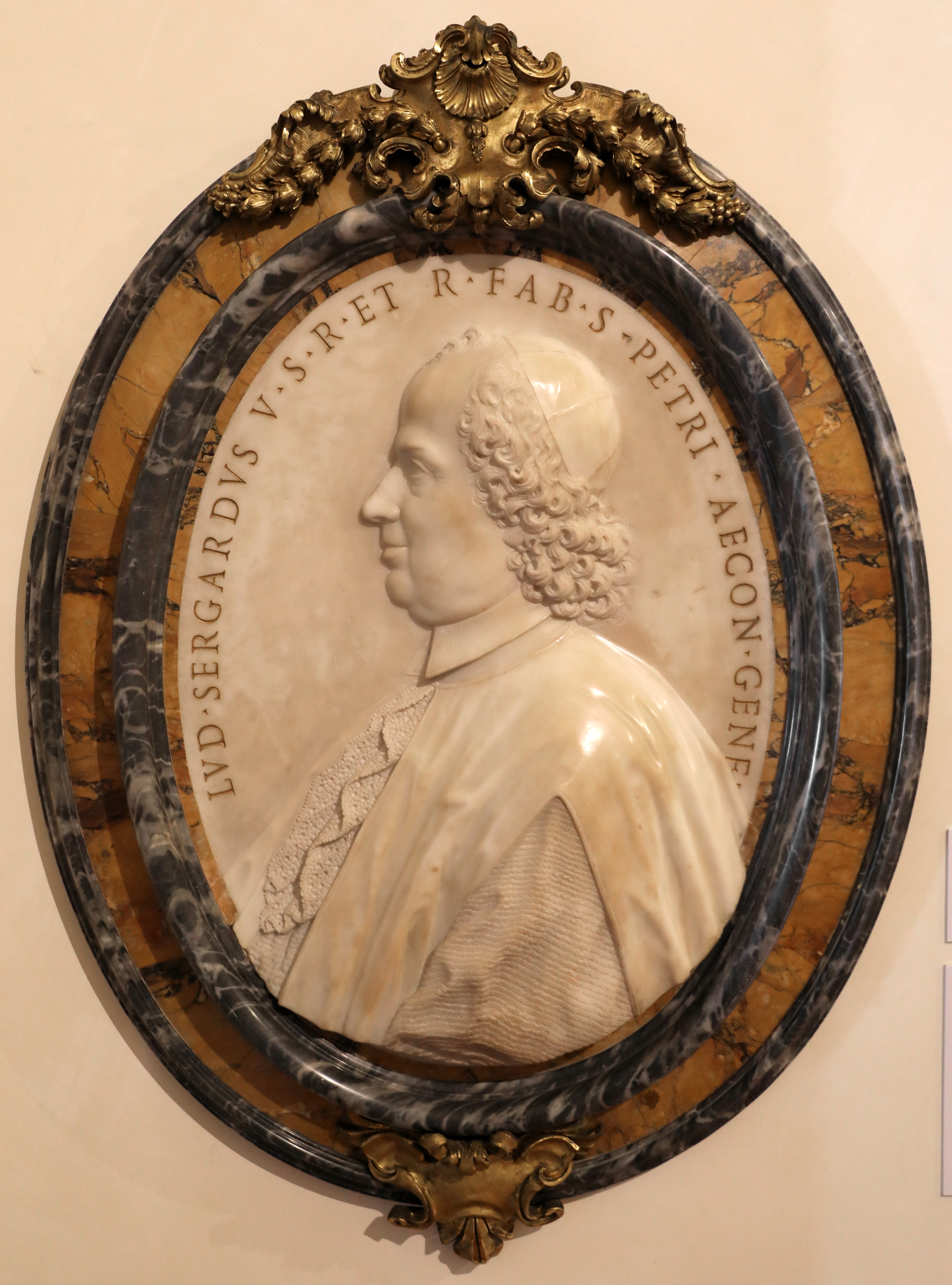
- Lodovico Sergardi
- Born: 27 March 1660; Siena, Grand Duchy of Tuscany
- Died: 7 November 1726 (aged 66); Spoleto, Papal States
- Resting place: Spoleto Cathedral
- Education: Sapienza University of Rome
- Occupations: Priest; Poet; Intellectual
- Parent(s): Curzio Sergardi and Olimpia Sergardi (née Biringucci)
- Writing career
- Pen name: Quintus Sectanus
- Language: Latin; Italian
- Notable work: Quinti Sectani Satyrae in Philodemum (1694)
- Movement: Neoclassicism

Lodovico Sergardi (b. at Siena, 1660; d. at Spoleto, 7 November 1726) was an Italian Roman Catholic priest and poet, chiefly known for his vivid latin satires against the jurist Giovanni Vincenzo Gravina, models of composition, which for nearly a decade kept the Roman public in an uproar. Sergardi's satires were an influence on Parini's Il giorno.

== Biography ==
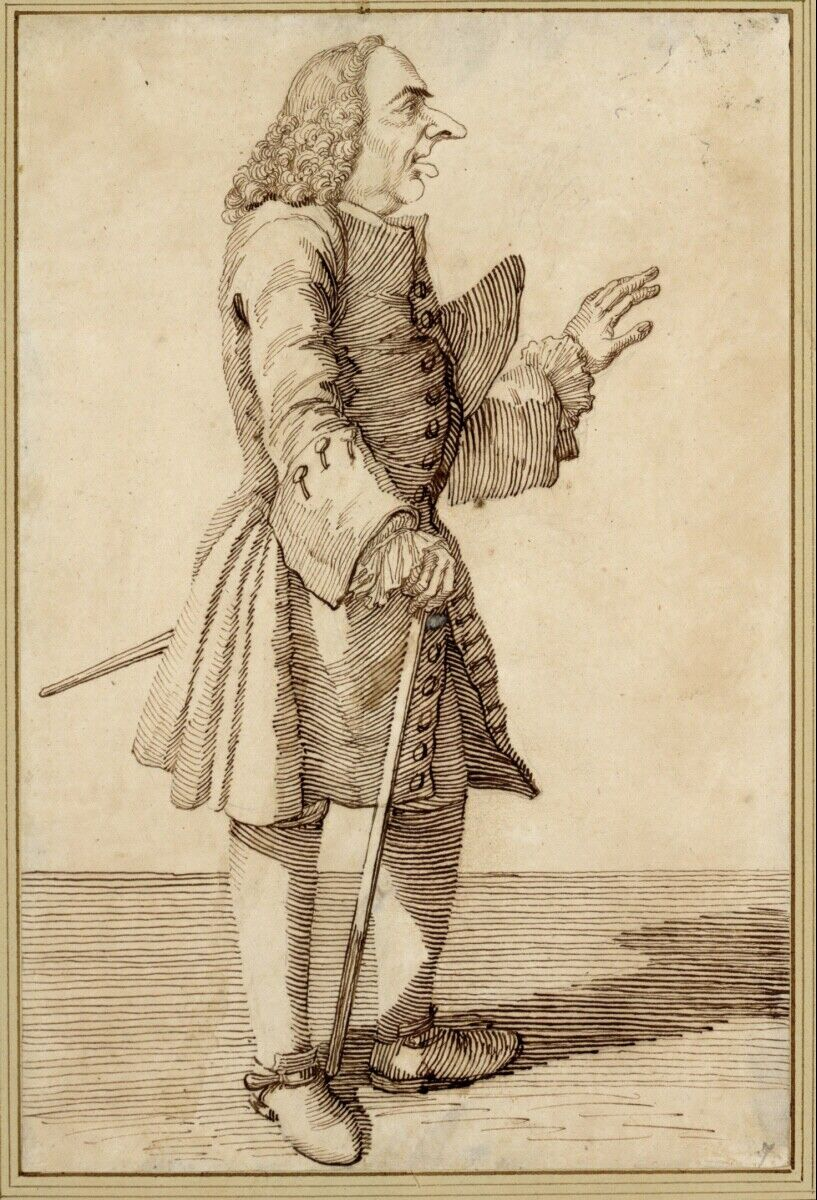
Caricature of Giovanni Vincenzo Gravina by Pier Leone Ghezzi

Sergardi was born in Siena of a noble family on 27 March 1660. As a youth he studied painting, literature, and philosophy, and showed a passionate inclination toward poetry.

In October 1684 he went to Rome to study jurisprudence. Soon after his arrival at Rome he began to make acquaintances among the literati of the city, and soon became the protégé of Prince Chigi. He befriended cardinal Pietro Ottoboni, and served him as Prefect of St. Peter's Basilica when he was elected pope as Alexander VIII in 1689.

An active member of the Republic of Letters, Sergardi soon became friends with such eminent scholars as Jean Mabillon and Francesco Bianchini, the keeper of the Ottoboni Library. In 1691 Sergardi became a member of the Academy of Arcadia under the pseudonym of “Licone”.

During the seances of the Academy, Sergardi began a spirited debate with the famed jurist Giovanni Vincenzo Gravina. The hatred between them soon split the academy into supporting factions. Sergardi attacked Gravina in a series of bitter latin satires published under the pseudonym of Quintus Sectanus (1694).

Sergardi's satires appeared in five editions between 1694 and 1701. They have the force, the poetical expression, and the freedom or, rather, licentiousness, of Juvenal. The Satires were translated into Terza rima as it is believed by the author himself. The latter part of the fourteenth is particularly fine. The Spanish scholar Manuel Martí published his Satyromastix in defence of Gravina.

Sergardi also had artistic and medical interests; he designed the pavement for St. Peter's Square and the position of the Vatican Obelisk, and sketched the kidney stones found in Pope Innocent XI's body after his death. Sergardi died in Spoleto in November 1726. He was buried in the Cathedral of Spoleto.

== Works ==
- Quinti Sectani satyræ in Philodemum (Naples, or Rome), 1694, in-8°.
- Satire di Settano tradotte in terza rima, Zürich (Florence), 1760, in-8°.
- Oratio pro eligendo summo pontifice post obitum Innocentii XI, Rome, 1689, in-4°.
- Orazione recitata in Campidoglio per l’accademia dell’arti liberali, ibid., 1703, in-4°.
- Distinta relazione della gran sala della cancelleria apostolica, ibid., 1719, in-4°.
- Discorso sopra il nuovo ornato della Guglia di San Pietro, ibid., 1723, in-fol.
- Relazione della statua equestre di Carlo Magno, eretta nel portico Vaticano, Siena, 1725, in-fol.
- Satyræ, argumentis, scholiis, enarrationibus illustratæ, Lucca, 1783, 4 vols. in-8°.

== Bibliography ==
- Quondam, Amedeo (1969). "Le satire di Ludovico Sergardi. Contributo ad una storia della cultura romana tra Sei e Settecento". La Rassegna della Letteratura Italiana. LXIII: 206–272.
- Citroni, Sandra (1976). "Le satire latine di Federico Nomi e di Ludovico Sergardi: aspetti dell'eredità di Giovenale alla fine del '600". Studi Secenteschi. 17 (33): 33–60.
- Pepin, Ronald E. (1996). "Lodovico Sergardi and the Roman satirical tradition". International Journal of the Classical Tradition. 2 (4): 555–559. doi:10.1007/BF02677890. S2CID 162272588.
- The Satires of Lodovico Sergardi. An English Translation and Introduction by Ronald E. Pepin (Seventeenth-Century Texts and Studies 4) (New York, San Francisco, Bern, etc., 1994), Introduction pp. 1–13 and notes to each of the fourteen satires.
- Pepin, Ronald E. (1990). "The Satires of "Sectanus" and the Spinelli archive". The Yale University Library Gazette. 65 (1/2): 20–25. JSTOR 40859610.
