= Nicolás Antonio =

Spanish bibliographer (1617–1684)

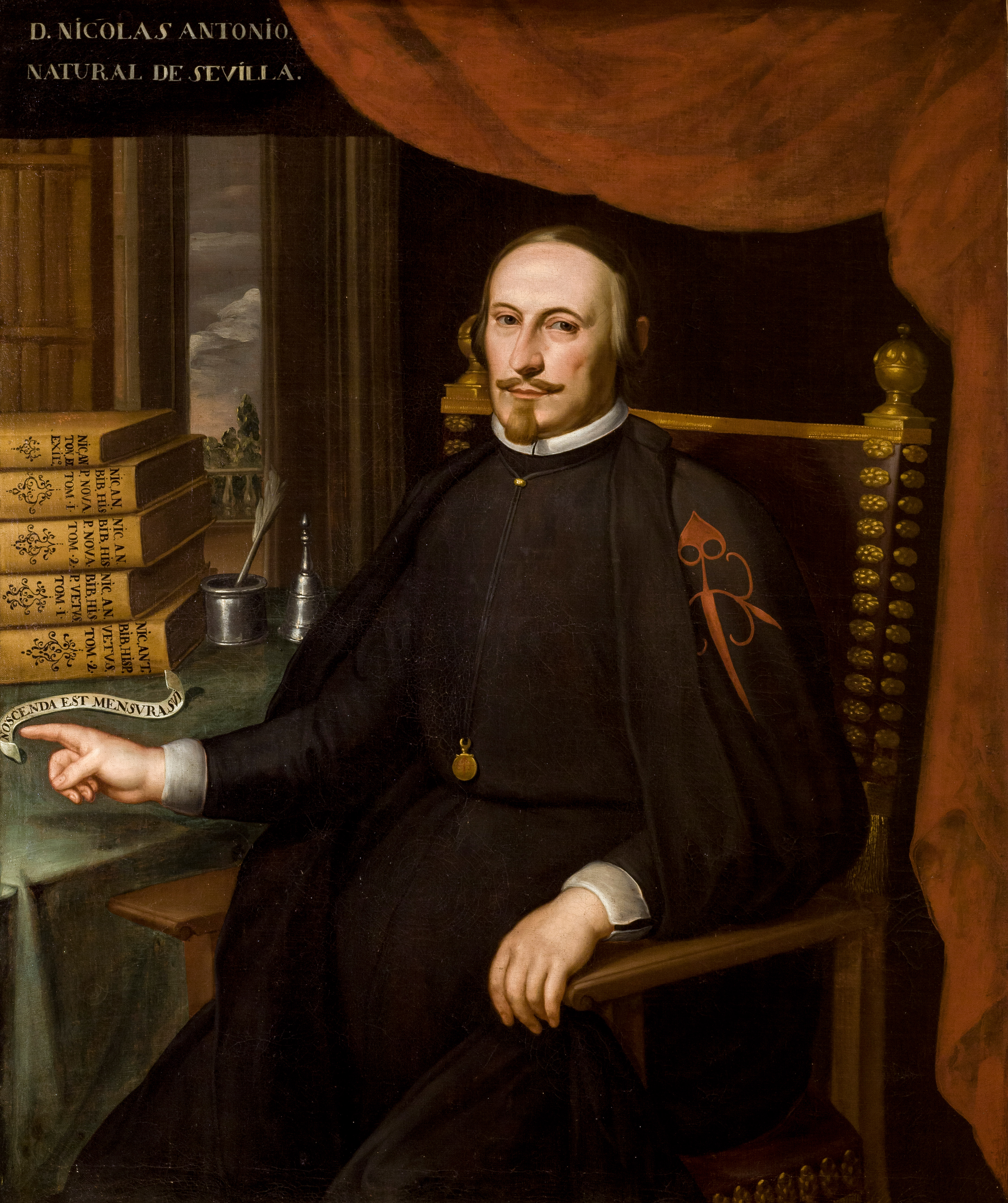
Nicolás Antonio

Nicolás Antonio (31 July 1617 – 13 April 1684) was a Spanish bibliographer born in Seville.

== Biography ==
After taking his degree in Salamanca (1636–1639), he returned to his native city, wrote his treatise De Exilio (which was not printed until 1659), and began his monumental register of Spanish writers. The fame of his learning reached Philip IV, who conferred the Order of Santiago on him in 1645, and sent him as General Agent to Rome in 1654.

Returning to Spain in 1679, Antonio died at Madrid in the spring of 1684. His Bibliotheca Hispana nova, dealing with the works of Spanish authors who flourished after 1500, appeared at Rome in 1672, under the title Bibliotheca Hispana sive Hispanorum; the Bibliotheca Hispana vetus, a literary history of Spain from the time of Augustus to the end of the 15th century, was revised by Manuel Martí, and published by Antonio's friend, Cardinal José Sáenz de Aguirre at Rome in 1696. A fine edition of both parts, with additional matter found in Antonio's manuscripts, and with supplementary notes by Francisco Pérez Bayer, was issued at Madrid in 1787–1788.

Of Antonio's miscellaneous writings the most important is the posthumous Censura de historias fabulosas (Valencia, 1742), in which erudition is combined with critical insight. His Bibliotheca Hispana rabinica has not been printed; the manuscript is in the national library at Madrid.
