= Carlo Archinto =

Italian aristocrat and patron of the arts

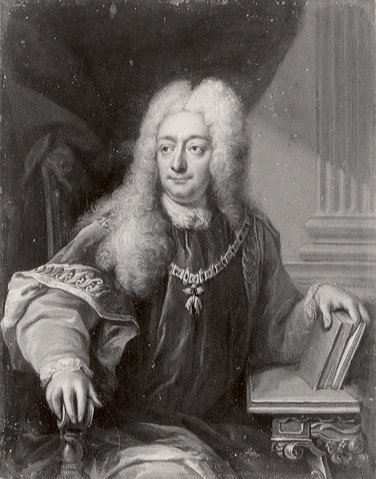
Portrait of Carlo Archinto

Count Carlo Archinto (30 July 1669 – 17 December 1732) was an Italian aristocrat and patron of the arts.

== Biography ==
Carlo Archinto was born into the aristocratic Archinto family and was educated initially under the Jesuits at the Brera Academy of Milan. He then studied with the Jesuits at the University of Ingolstadt. He travelled as a young man through France, Germany, Holland, and his native Italy and returned in Milan in 1700. He formed a very choice library in his palace, which he enriched with a rare collection of mathematical instruments. In 1702, he founded a scholarly academy, which met at his palace. He collaborated with Filippo Argelati to publish the epic history by Muratori, titled Rerum italicarum scriptores. He was rewarded with appointments by the Hapsburg rulers. The Emperor Leopold made Archinto his chamberlain, and Charles II of Spain created him a knight of the Golden Fleece, and Philip V a grandee of Spain. Archinto commissioned frescoes by the Venetian Tiepolo to decorate his family's Palazzo Archinto. He died on the 17 December, 1732.

== Works ==
Carlo Archinto wrote several works both in Latin and Italian; one, the annotations on the Third, Fourth, and Fifth Books of the Histories of Arnulf of Milan, is published in fourth volume of the Rerum italicarum scriptores, and some tables of the sciences were published anonymously at Venice after the anthor's death, under the title Tabulæ precipua Scientiarum et Artium Capita digesta per Ordinem repræsentantes.
