= Margherita Sparapani Gentili Boccapadule =

Roman noble (1735–1820)

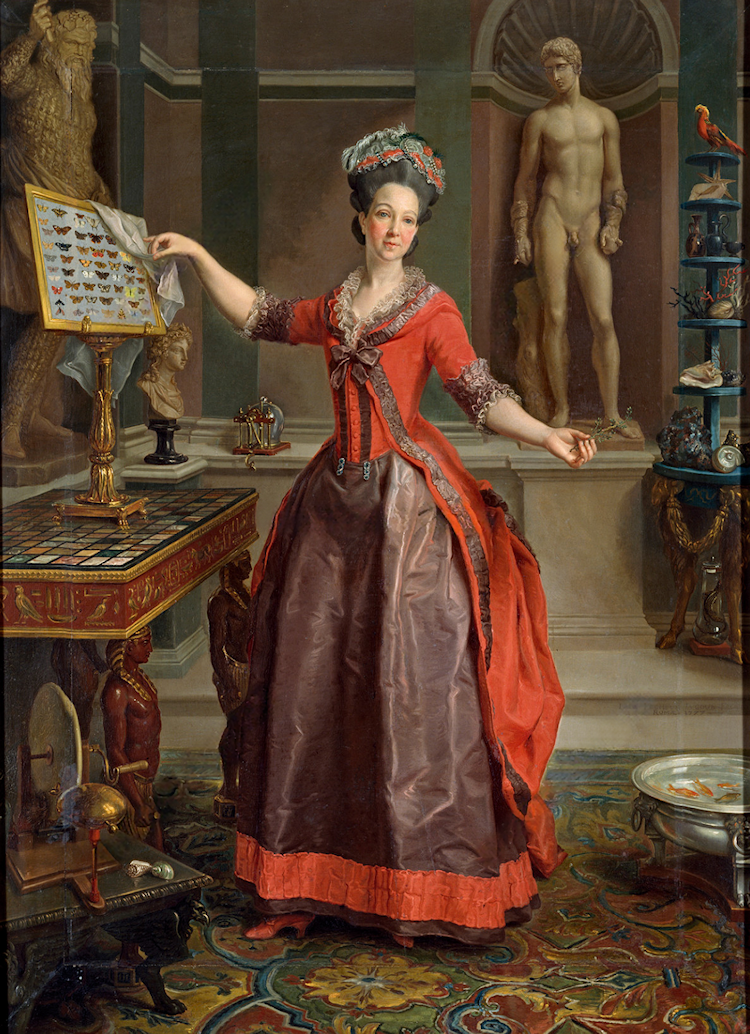
Margherita Sparapani Gentili Boccapadule by Laurent Pécheux, 1777

Margherita Sparapani Gentili Boccapadule (Camerino, 29 October 1735 - Rome, 13 December 1820), was a Roman noble, salon holder, and traveler. She was also known for her interest in literature and nature science, and a member of the Accademia degli Arcadi.
