= Diodata Saluzzo Roero =

Italian writer

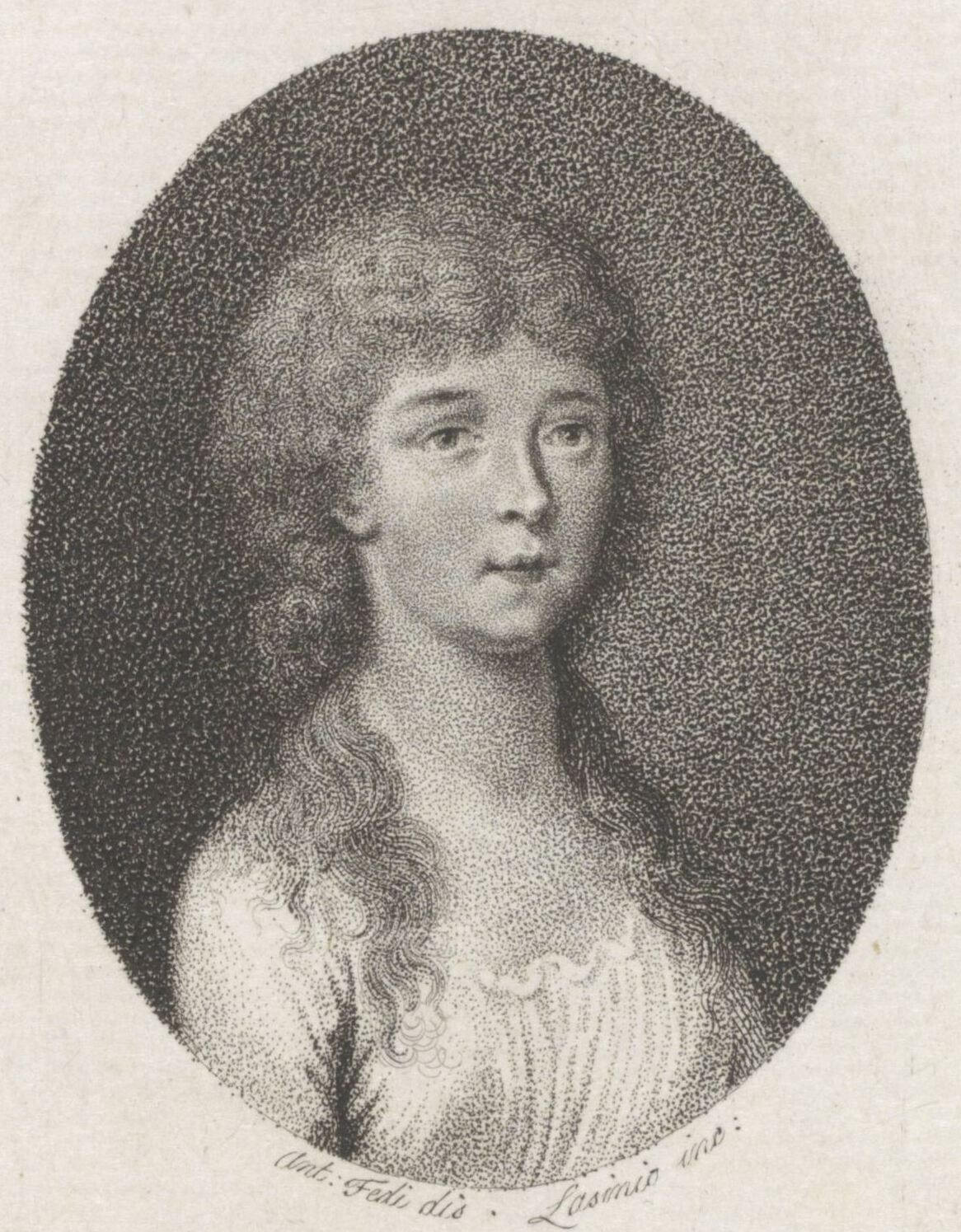
- Born: 1774; Turin
- Died: 1840 (aged 65–66); Turin
- Education: Accademia degli Arcadi
- Occupations: Poet, playwright, author
- Known for: Il Castello di Binasco

Diodata Saluzzo Roero (1774–1840) was an Italian poet, playwright and author of prose fiction. Her work drew praise from such figures as Tommaso Valperga di Caluso, Giuseppe Parini, Ludovico di Breme, Alessandro Manzoni, Vittorio Alfieri and Ugo Foscolo, and her life served as an inspiration for the protagonist in Germaine de Staël's 1807 Corinne.

Diodata Saluzzo was born in Turin to Jeronima Cassotti di Casalgrasso and Giuseppe Angelo Saluzzo di Monesiglio, a well-known scientist. In 1795 she became one of the first women to be admitted to the Accademia degli Arcadi, and the following year released her first collection of poems. In 1799 she married the count Massimiliano Roero di Revello, but on his death three years later returned to live with her family. A collection of her romantic short stories on historical themes was published in 1830. Of these the best known is Il Castello di Binasco, a novella based on the second marriage and execution of Beatrice di Tenda, first published in Raccoglitore in 1819.

Diodata Saluzzo Roero died in Turin in 1840.
