= Giovanni Mario Crescimbeni =

Italian critic and poet

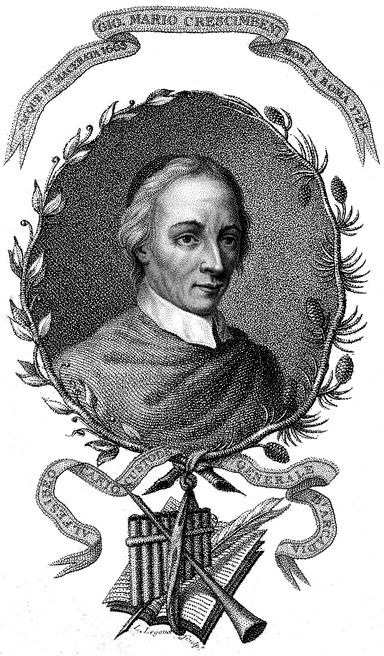
- Giovanni Mario Crescimbeni
- Born: 9 October 1663; Macerata, Papal States
- Died: 8 March 1728 (aged 64); Rome, Papal States
- Occupations: Poet and critic
- Writing career
- Period: 17th century
- Notable work: Istoria della volgar poesia

Giovanni Mario Crescimbeni (Latinized as Ioannes Maria Crescimbenus, 9 October 1663 – 8 March 1728) was an Italian critic and poet. Crescimbeni was a founding member and leader of the erudite literary society of Accademia degli Arcadi in Rome.

== Biography ==
Born in Macerata, which was then part of the Papal States, and educated by a French priest in Rome, he entered the Jesuits' college of his native town, where he produced a tragedy on the story of Darius, and versified the Pharsalia. In 1679 he received the degree of doctor of law, and in 1680 he moved again to Rome.

The study of Vincenzo Filicaja and Niccolò Leonico having convinced him that he and all his contemporaries were working in the wrong direction, he resolved to attempt a general reform. In 1690, in conjunction with fourteen others, he founded the celebrated Academy of Arcadians, and began the contest against false taste and its adherents. The academy was most successful; branch societies were opened in all the principal cities of Italy; and the influence of Giambattista Marino, opposed by the simplicity and elegance of such models as Angelo di Costanzo, soon died away.

Crescimbeni officiated as secretary to the Arcadians for thirty-eight years. He edited 7 volumes of members' biographies (1708–1727) and 12 volumes of their verse and prose works (1716–1722). In 1705 he was made canon of Santa Maria in Cosmedin; in 1715 he obtained the chief curacy attached to the same church; and about two months before he died (1728) he was admitted a member of the Society of Jesus. His principal work is the Istoria della volgar poesia (1698), an estimate of all the poets of Italy, past and contemporary, which may yet be consulted with advantage.

The most important of his numerous other publications are the Commentarii (5 volumes, 1702–1711), and La Bellezza della volgar poesia (1700).

== Works ==
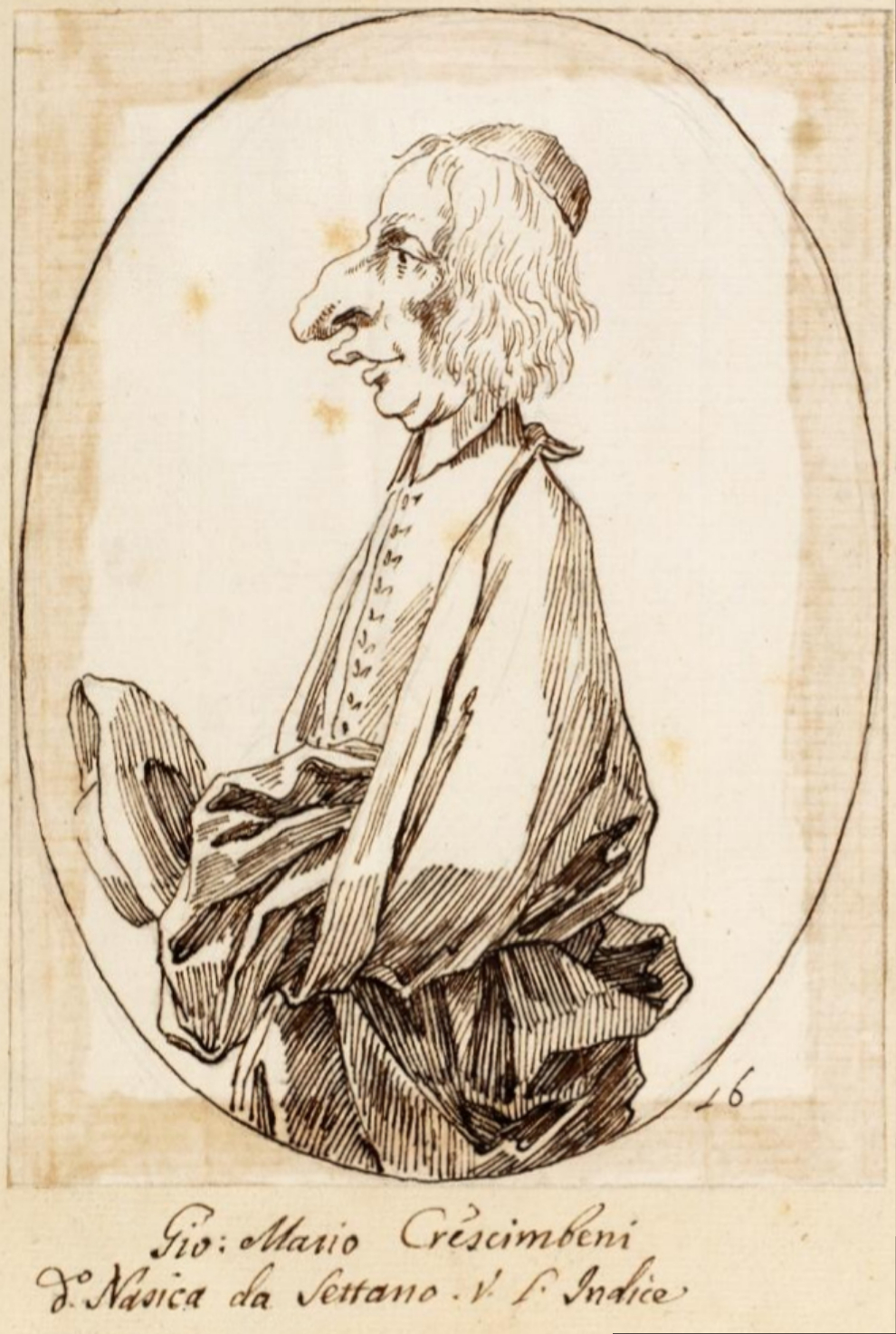
Caricature of Giovanni Mario Crescimbeni by Pier Leone Ghezzi. 1623

- Istoria della volgar poesia (1698)
- La bellezza della volgar poesia (1700, 1712^{2})
- L' Arcadia del canonico Gio. Mario Crescimbeni custode della medesima Arcadia, di nuovo ampliata, e pubblicata d'ordine della Generale Adunanza degli Arcadi, colla giunta del Catalogo de' medesimi (1711)
- L'istoria della chiesa di S. Giovanni avanti Porta Latina, titolo cardinalizio, scritta da Gio. Mario Crescimbeni Canonico di S. Maria in Cosmedin (1716)
- Comentarj del canonico Gio. Mario Crescimbeni custode d'Arcadia intorno alla sua Istoria della volgar poesia. Volume secondo parte prima contenente l'ampliazione del secondo libro dell'Istoria, mediante le vite, i giudizi, e i saggi de' poeti provenzali, che furono padri della detta poesia volgare (1722)
- Le Vite degli Arcadi illustri / scritte da diversi autori, pubblicate d'ordine della Generale Adunanza da Giovan Mario Crescimbeni (1708-1727)
- Poesie d'Alessandro Guidi pavese con la sua vita descritta da Gio. Mario Crescimbeni e due ragionamenti di Vincenzo Gravina
- L'istoria della basilica di s. Anastasia titolo cardinalizio, scritta da Gio. Mario Crescimbeni arciprete di s. Maria in Cosmedin, e custode generale d'Arcadia (1722) (History of Sant'Anastasia al Palatino)

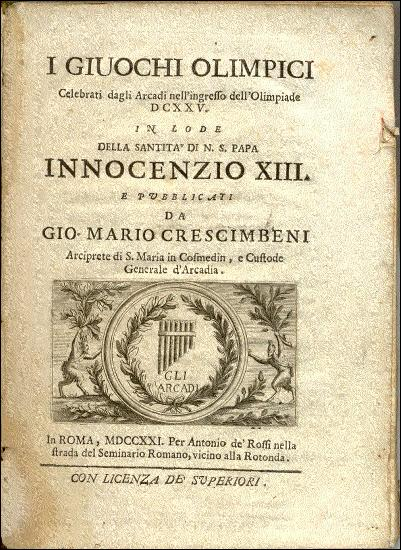
The Olympic Games

- Serie cronologica dei cardinali diaconi dei prelati vicarii degli arcipreti e canonici e di altri componenti il capitolo della persigne basilica di Santa Maria in Cosmedin
- Notizie istoriche della sacra immagine della beatissima Vergine. Titolare della basilica di S. Maria in Cosmedin di Roma, estratte per maggior comodo de' divoti dall'Istoria, e dallo Stato di essa basilica di Gio. Mario Crescimbeni arciprete delle medesima. All'eminentissimo ... cardinale Alessandro Albani (1722)
- L' Elvio favola pastorale d'Alfesibeo Cario pastore, e custode d'Arcadia. Alla gentiliss. e valorosiss. pastorella arcade Amaranta Eleusina (1695)
- Rime di Alfesibeo Cario custode d'Arcadia. Col catalogo, e chiaue de' pastori Arcadi nominati in questa, e in altre opere dell'istesso autore (1695)
- Vita di Monsignor Gabbriello Filippucci Maceratese, scritta da Giovan Mario Crescimbeni (1698)
- Notizie istoriche degli Arcadi morti (1721)
