= Miguel Venegas =

Jesuit administrator and historian (1680–1764)

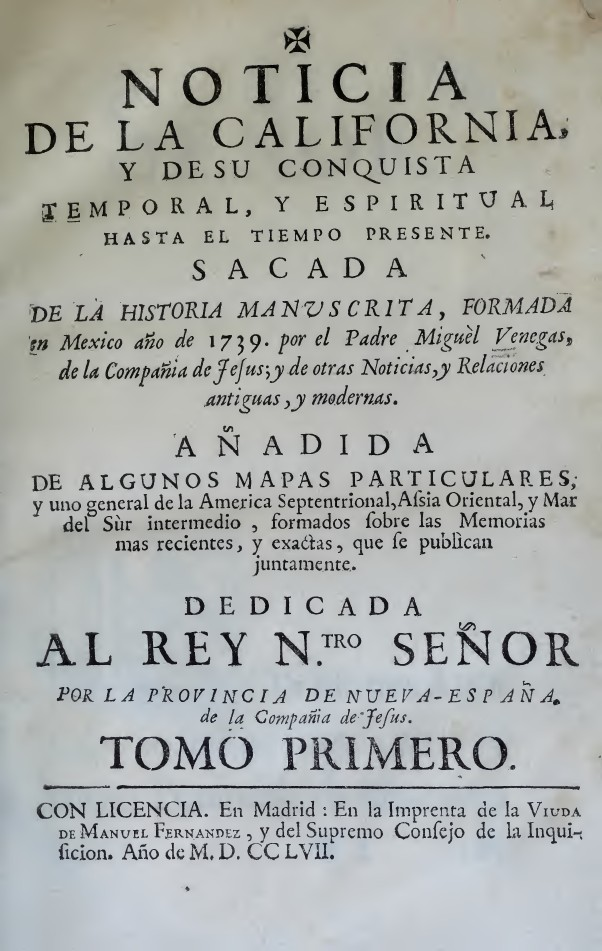
Noticia de la California

Miguel Venegas SJ (1680–1764) was a Jesuit administrator and historian. He is most known for his book Noticia de la California, a standard geographical, historical, and ethnographic description of Baja California, Mexico—a region he never personally visited.

== Biography ==
Miguel Venegas was born in Puebla, New Spain. He received an academic degree prior to joining the Jesuit order, which he did in 1700 in Tepotzotlán. Five years later he was an ordained member and he taught philosophy and moral theology at the Colegio S. Pedro y S. Pablo de México. He suffered from poor health and edema which obliged him to retire to the Jesuit ranch of Chicomocelo, where he devoted himself to writing and botany until his death in 1764.

As a historian, he was cautious in his investigations, critical in his selection of sources and concerned with discovering the truth. In his major work on California, he cited Georg Marcgraf and Willem Piso's Historia Naturalis Brasiliae (1648), an important compendium on flora and fauna in Brazil, which circulated widely in northern Europe and beyond.

== Published works ==
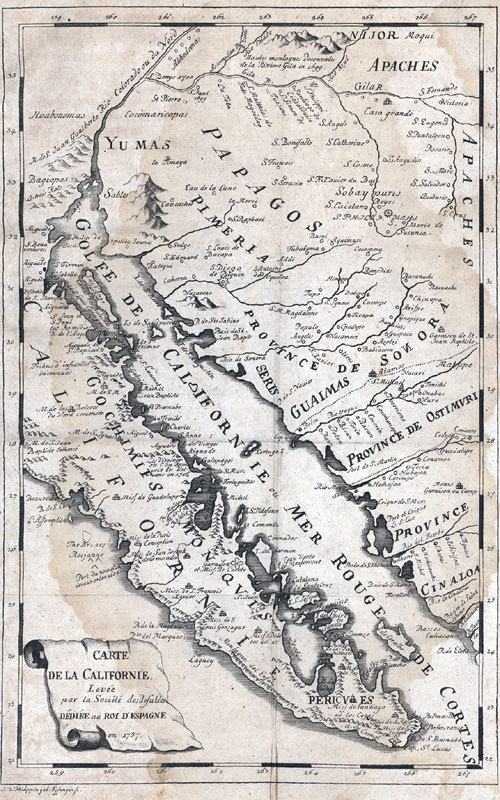
Map of Baja California, from the 1766 French edition of Noticia de la California.

In the mid-1730s, he was assigned the task of writing an account of Baja California. This seems to have been, at least in part, to counter the setback to the missionaries' efforts and reputation caused by the Pericú revolt on the southernmost part of the peninsula in 1734. The historian was given access to the missionaries' correspondence and reports, and he was able to exchange letters with them to acquire further information, which he did through the use of questionnaires.

Venegas' 600-page manuscript, Empresas Apostólicas, was completed in 1739. It was sent to Spain, but it languished there rather than seeing publication because it was too detailed with regard to military matters. Another Jesuit historian, Andrés Marcos Burriel, extensively revised Venegas' manuscript in the 1750s, and it was finally published in 1757 as Noticia de la California in three volumes at Madrid. This work by Venegas and Burriel was subsequently translated into English (1759), Dutch (1761–1762), French (1766–1767), and German (1769–1770), and it became the standard source for information about the early Californias. The original manuscript was published in a facsimile edition in 1979.

Venegas was a prolific writer, also authoring biographical and theological treatises. Among his other works are a manual on how to administer the sacraments, the official ritual for the Mexican branch of the Catholic church (1731), a biography of Juan María de Salvatierra (1754a, 1929) and a biography of Juan Bautista Zappa (1754b). Many of these were edited extensively before publication due to Venegas' writing style, which was too verbose for his fellow Jesuits.

=== Books by Venegas ===
- 1731. Manual de párrocos, para administrar los santos sacramentos, y exercer otras functiones ecclesiásticas conforme al ritual romano. J. D. de Hogal, Mexico.
- 1754a. El apóstol Mariano representado en la vida del V.P. Juan María de Salvatierra, de la Compañía de Jesús. Doña María de Rivera, Mexico City.
- 1754b. Vida y virtudes del V.P. Juan Bautista Zappa de la Compañía de Jesús. Pablo Nadal, Barcelona.
- 1757. Noticia de la California, y de su conquista temporal, y espiritual hasta el tiempo presente. Viuda de M. Fernández, Madrid.

Translations of Noticia de la California:

- 1759. A Natural and Civil History of California. James Rivington and James Fletcher, London.
- 1761–1762. Natuurlyke en burgerlyke historie van California. Johannes Enschedé, Te Haerlem, Netherlands.
- 1766–1767. Histoire naturelle et civile de la Californie. Chez Durand, Paris.
- 1769–1770. Natürliche und bürgerliche Geschichte von Californien. Meyerschen Buchhandlung, Lemgo, Germany.
