= Palazzo Taglieschi =

- Museo delle arti e tradizioni popolari dell'Alta Valle del Tevere
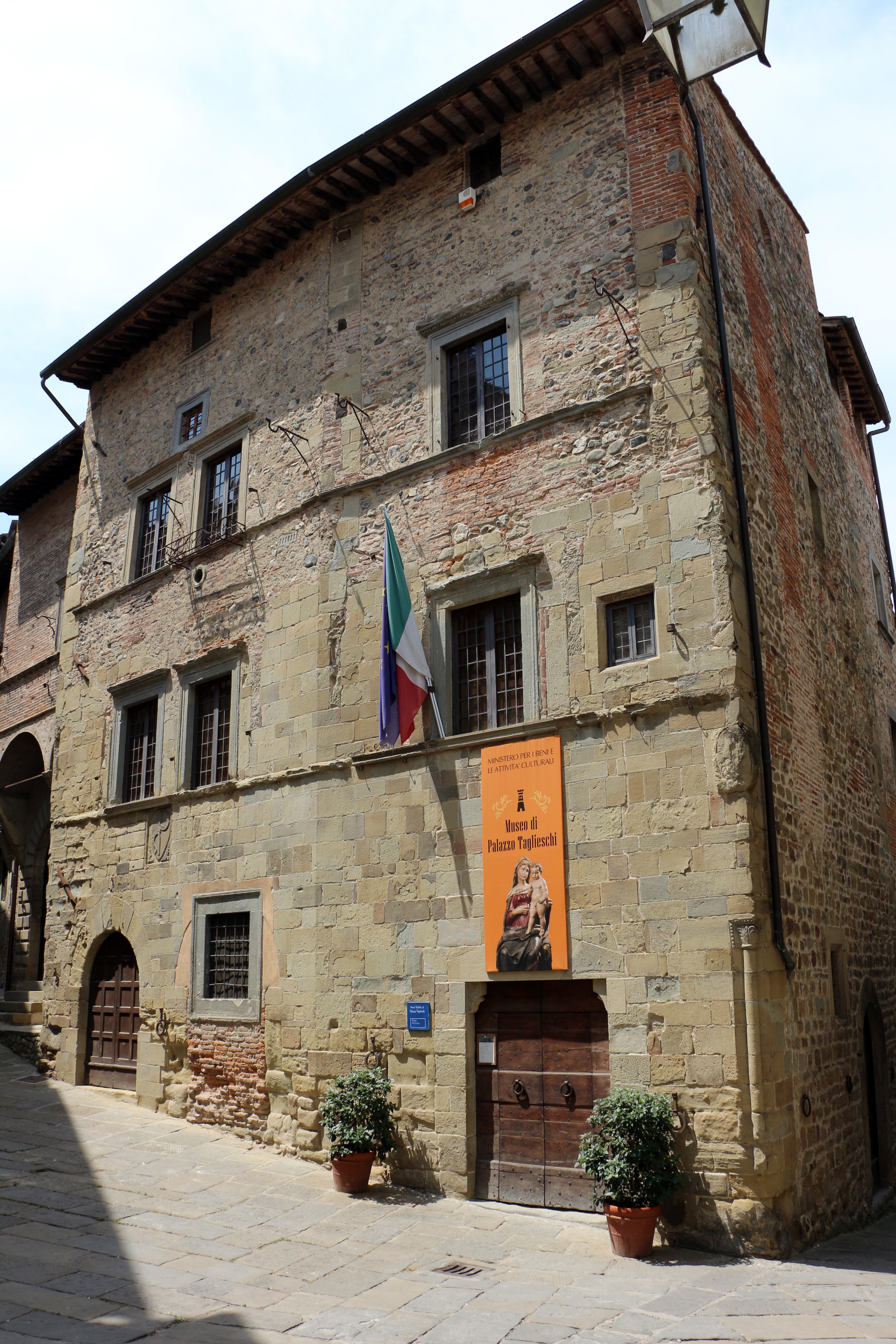
- Palazzo Taglieschi, seat of the museum

- Location within Tuscany
- Established: 1975
- Location: Anghiari, Province of Arezzo, Tuscany, Italy
- Coordinates: 43°32′27″N 12°03′23″E
- Type: State museum; art and ethnography
- Director: Marco Musmeci
- Owner: (Italy) Repubblica Italiana - Ministero della Cultura

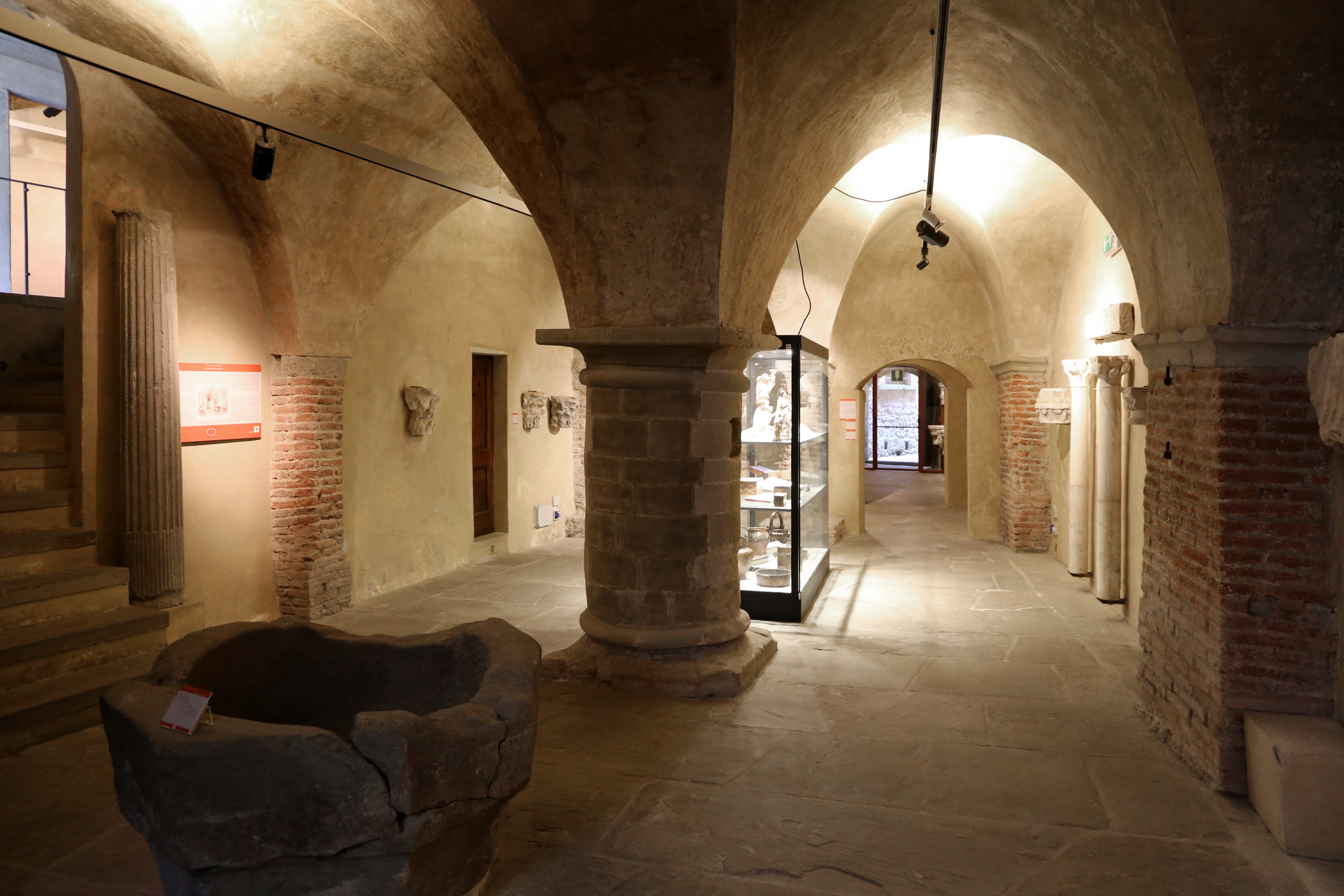
Ground floor

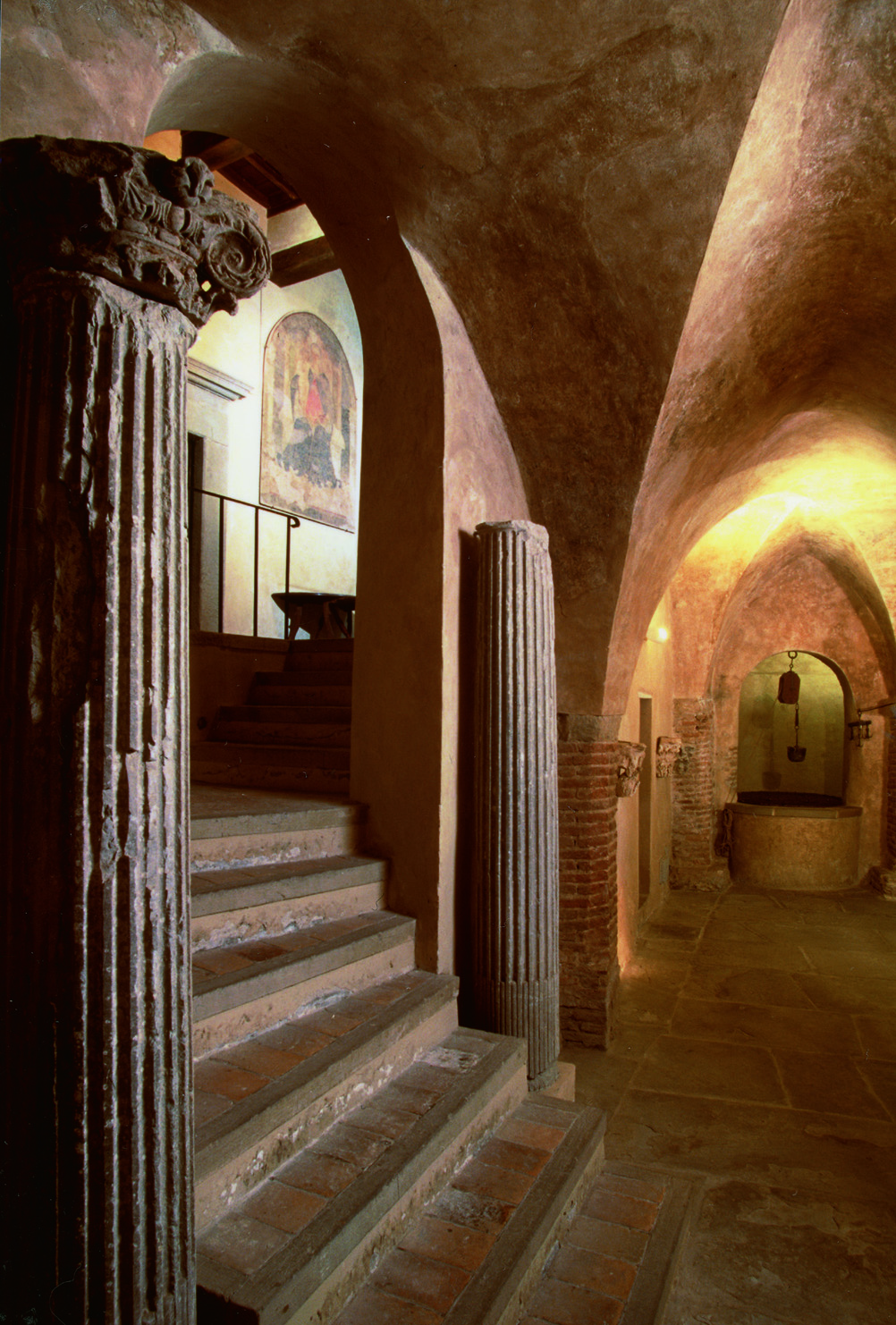
staircase to the ground floor

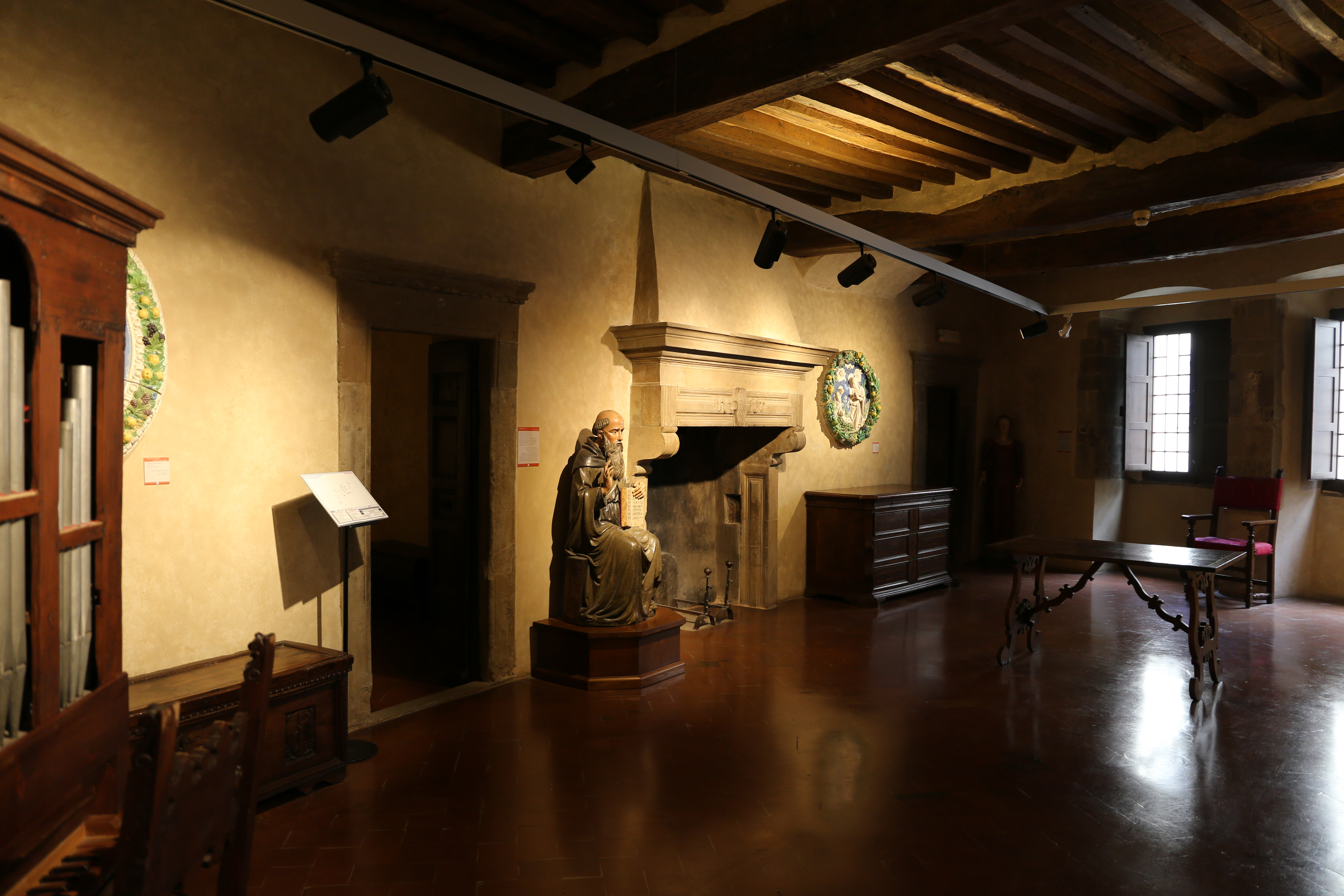
First floor

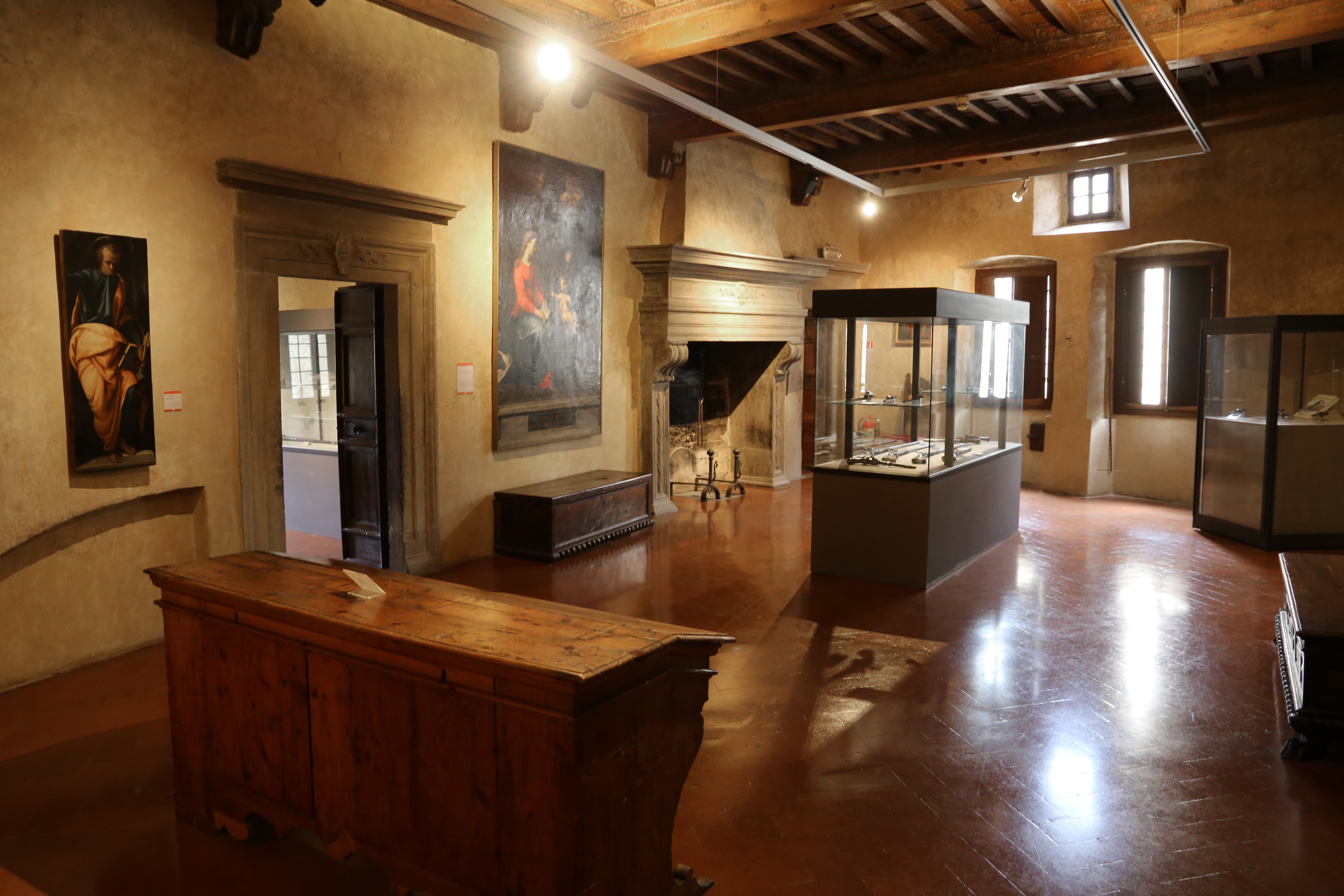
Second floor

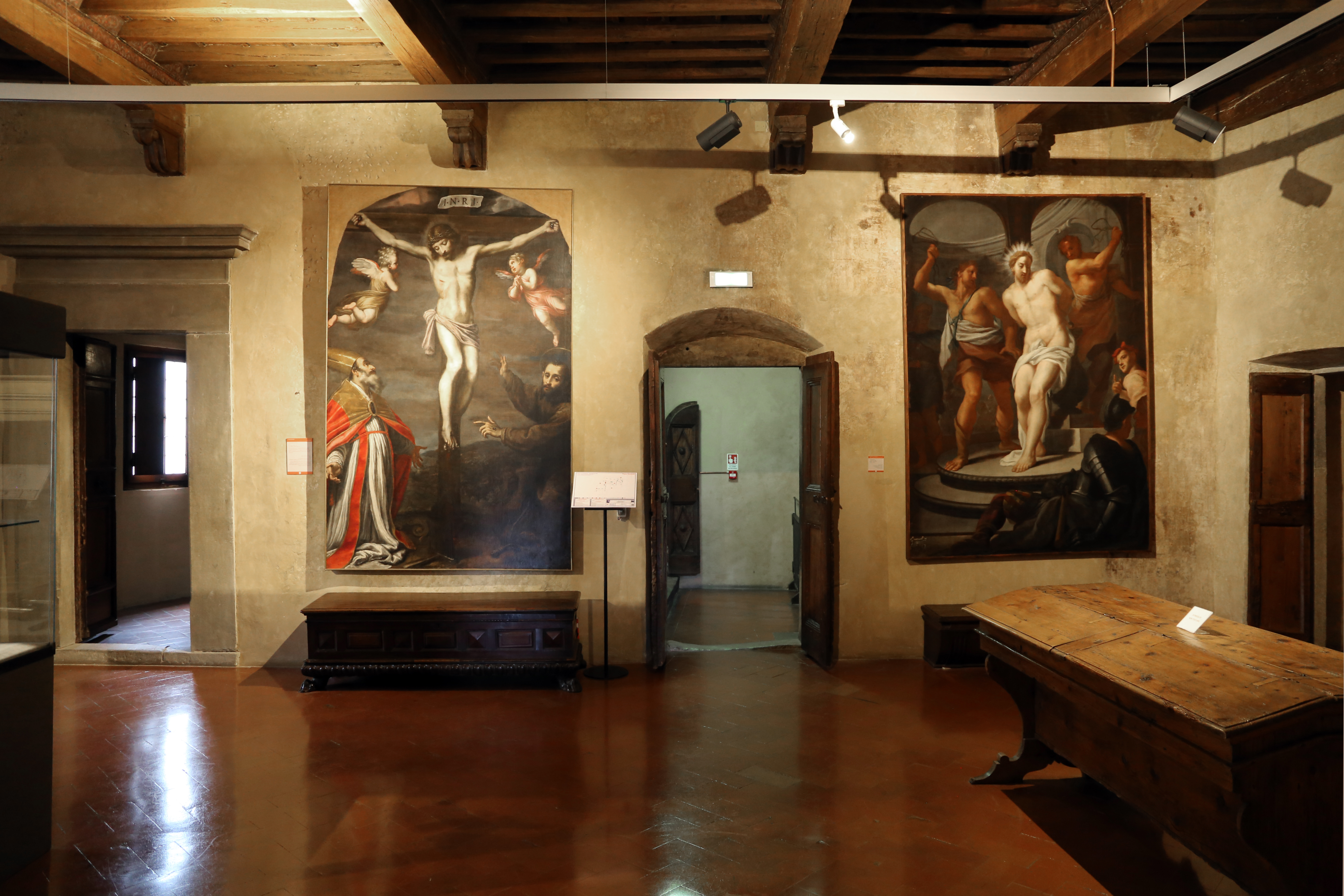
Second floor

Palazzo Taglieschi is a Renaissance palace in Anghiari, in the Province of Arezzo, Tuscany, central Italy. It houses the Museo delle arti e tradizioni popolari dell'Alta Valle del Tevere ("Museum of Arts and Popular Traditions of the Upper Tiber Valley"), a state museum open since 1975.

The museum brings together works of art from the 14th to the 18th century, gathered from churches and historic buildings of the Upper Tiber Valley, alongside a large collection of domestic and agricultural objects connected with local folk traditions. Its best-known work is a polychrome wooden Madonna and Child attributed to Jacopo della Quercia and dated to about 1420.

== History ==
=== The palace ===
The palace stands in the heart of the medieval "Borghetto" district of Anghiari. It was created around the mid-15th century by amalgamating several pre-existing medieval tower houses, which were remodelled in Renaissance forms. It belonged to the Taglieschi, reputed to be the richest family in the area in the 15th and 16th centuries. Tradition ascribes the work to the condottiero Matteo di Antonio di Bartolomeo Taglieschi, known as Matteo Cane ("Matteo the Dog"), a mercenary captain in the service of Genoa, Florence and Bologna who also served several times as ambassador for the community of Anghiari; the date 1437 is carved on the façade beneath the family arms. His nickname is recalled by a small corner column between the façade and Via Mameli, which once bore a carved dog's head above the Taglieschi coat of arms, though neither the head nor the arms now survive. The masons are said to have followed the canons of the Florentine and Urbino schools, yet within the overall Renaissance appearance several medieval features remain, such as the pointed arched windows of the side elevation, the upper storey projecting on corbels, and a groin vaulted storeroom.

The building kept the Taglieschi name even after passing, from the early 16th century, to the Angiolieri, Testi and Lisi families. By 1881 it had been heavily subdivided; after the Second World War it sheltered the town's poorest families, and restoration to its patrician appearance began in the 1960s.

=== The museum ===
The museum originated in the 1959 bequest of Don Nilo Conti, a priest, scholar and collector from Anghiari and the building's last owner, who gave the palace together with his collection so that it might become the nucleus of a public collection. It was inaugurated on 6 September 1975 by Giovanni Spadolini, the Minister for Cultural Heritage; its fiftieth anniversary was marked in 2025. Since 2014 it has been run by the Italian Ministry of Culture through its regional museums directorate for Tuscany. In February 2026 the architect Marco Musmeci was appointed director.

== Collection ==
The museum occupies about twenty rooms on four levels, linked by a wooden staircase and ending in a glazed loggia overlooking the town; a distinctive feature of the display is the pairing of major works of art with everyday domestic and agricultural objects. The ground floor illustrates the history of the valley through stone fragments and detached frescoes, ranging from Roman capitals to Gothic reliefs; one room holds the so-called Catorcio di Anghiari, the bolt of the town-bridge gate that is celebrated in the mock-heroic poem Catorciade by the local writer Federico Nomi.

The piano nobile is given over to wooden sculpture and Della Robbia glazed terracotta, and holds the museum's masterpiece, Jacopo della Quercia's Madonna and Child, shown together with 13th- and 14th-century polychrome Madonnas from churches of the district. The same floor preserves a rare table positive organ of the early 16th century, still playable, from the former church of Santo Stefano in Anghiari. The upper floors display a collection of richly decorated Anghiari arms, devotional paintings of the 16th and 17th centuries—by Giovanni Antonio Sogliani, Matteo Rosselli, Jacopo Vignali and Giovan Battista Ghidoni—liturgical vestments, and a notable assemblage of ex-votos and dressed devotional statuettes (Madonnine agghindate) from Conti's collection.

=== Notable works ===
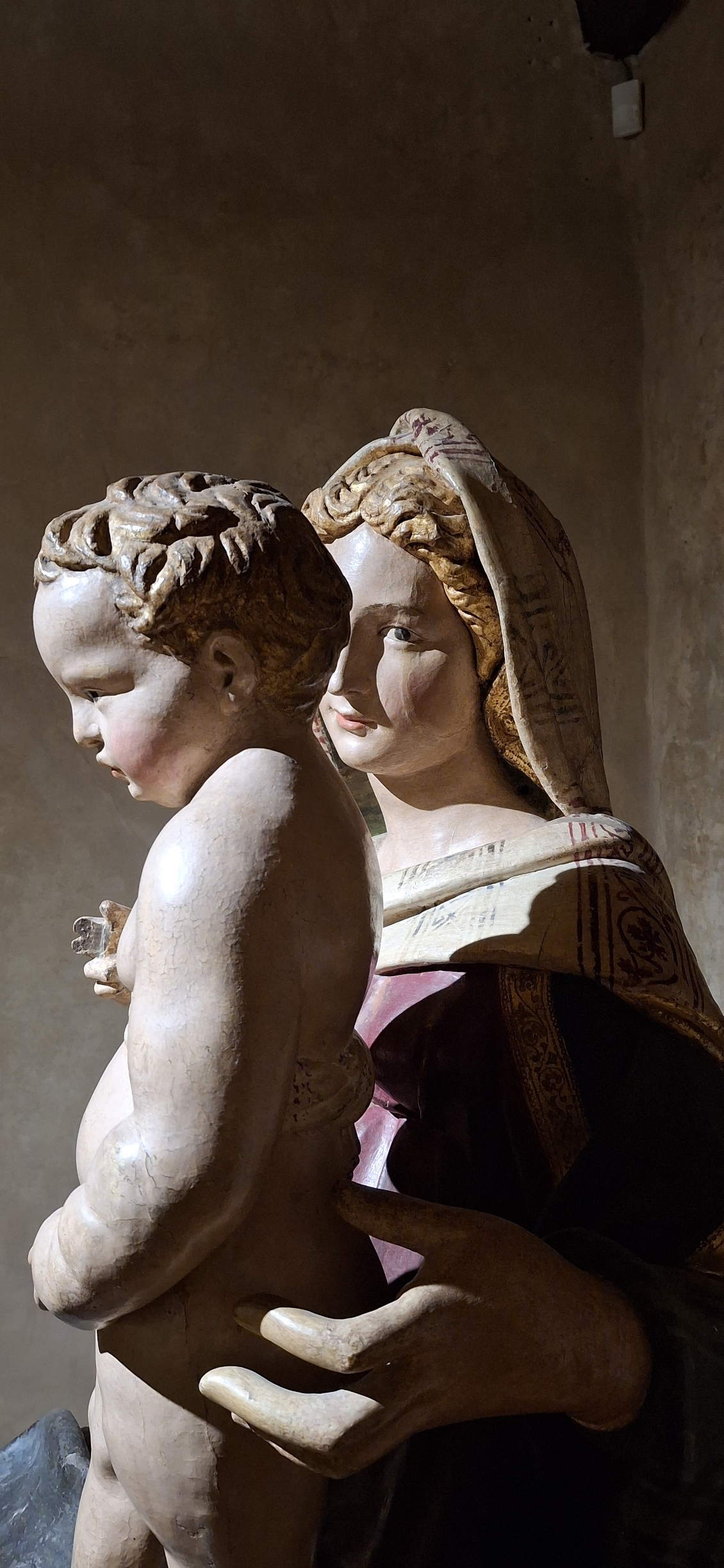
Madonna and Child, Jacopo della Quercia, 1420 c.a.

The polychrome wooden Madonna and Child attributed to Jacopo della Quercia is the museum's masterpiece. It was dated on stylistic grounds to about 1420 by the art historian Anna Maria Maetzke, and was made for a church in Anghiari at the commission of the Confraternity of Santa Maria della Misericordia, as recorded by an inscription painted on the base; the Child may not be original to the group. Acquired by the Italian state in 1977, it comes from a chapel near Anghiari.

The glazed terracotta Nativity and Saints, bearing the arms of the Ducci di Catenaia, was given by Filippo Ducci to the abbey church (Badia) of Anghiari in 1472. The museum guide tentatively attributes it to Andrea della Robbia, whereas the Dizionario Biografico degli Italiani connects it with Girolamo della Robbia. The museum also holds a lunette of Christ and the Samaritan Woman attributed to Benedetto Buglioni.

== See also ==
- Battle of Anghiari
- Della Robbia
- Jacopo della Quercia

== Sources ==
- Caporossi, Luisa (2013). "Museo Statale di Palazzo Taglieschi". In Refice, Paola; Teza, Laura (eds.). Capolavori in Valtiberina. Da Piero della Francesca a Burri. Piccoli, Grandi Musei (in Italian). Vol. 34. Florence: Polistampa. pp. 46–47. ISBN 978-88-596-1278-0.
- Speranza, Laura. Anghiari. Museo statale di Palazzo Taglieschi (in Italian). Anghiari: Comune di Anghiari – Soprintendenza ai Beni Artistici e Storici di Arezzo.
