= Giovanni Vincenzo Gravina =

Italian writer and jurist (1664–1718)

Gian Vincenzo Gravina
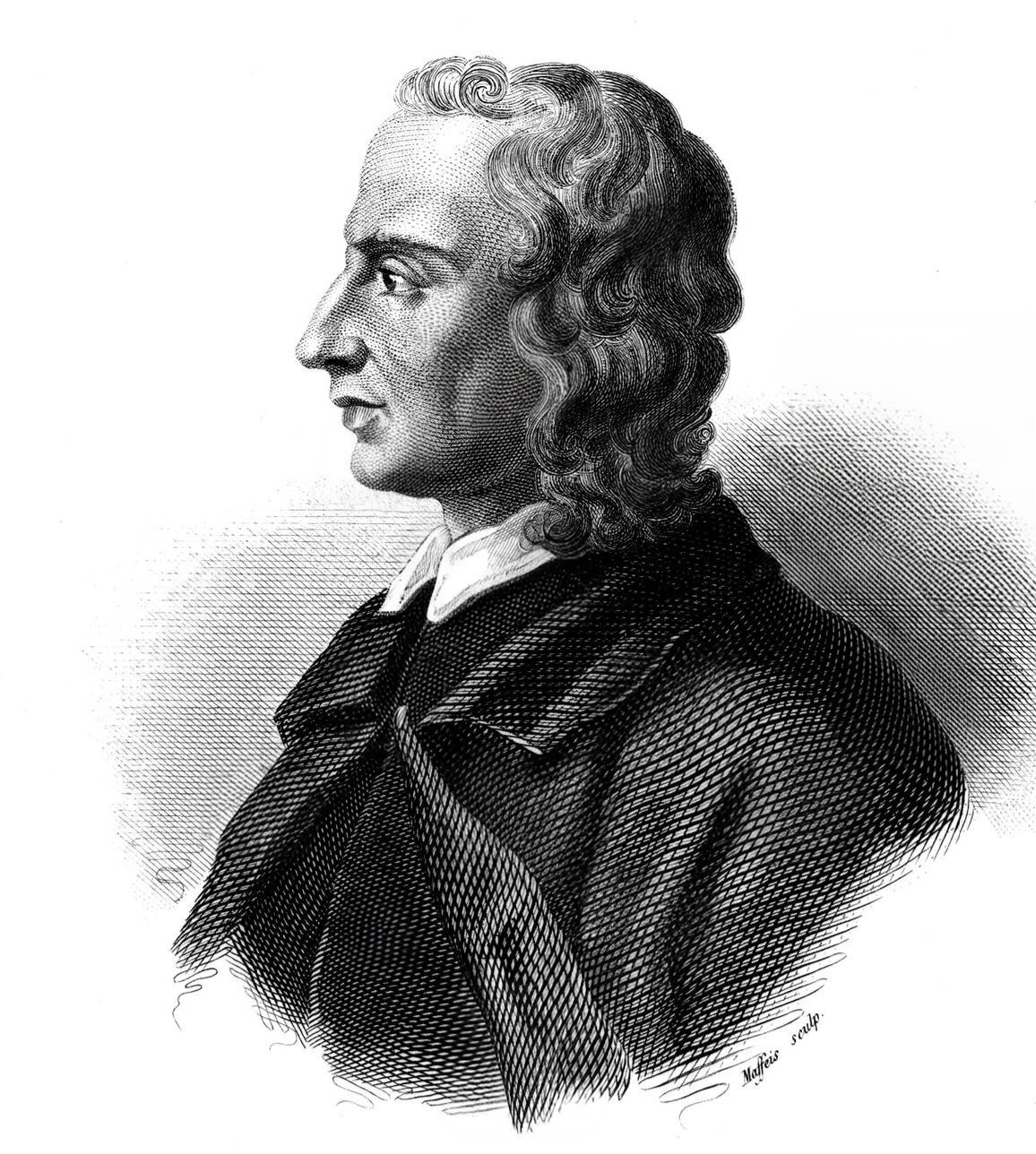
- Engraved portrait of Gian Vincenzo Gravina by Sperandio Maffeis
- Born: 20 January 1664; Roggiano Gravina, Kingdom of Naples
- Died: 6 January 1718 (aged 53); Rome, Papal States
- Occupations: Jurist, university teacher
- Parent(s): Gennaro Gravina and Anna Gravina (née Lombardi)

Academic work
- Era: 17th century
- Discipline: Roman law, Ancient history
- Institutions: Sapienza University of Rome
- Doctoral students: Orazio Filippo Bianchi
- Notable works: Origines juris civilis De Romano imperio

Giovanni Vincenzo Gravina (20 January 1664 – 6 January 1718) was an Italian man of letters and jurist. He was the adoptive father of the poet Metastasio. Gravina was one of the foremost Italian jurists of the late 17th century. His views exerted considerable influence outside his own country, particularly upon Montesquieu.

== Biography ==
Giovanni Vincenzo Gravina was born at Roggiano a small town near Cosenza, to a well-off family. He was early sent to study with his maternal uncle, Gregorio Caloprese, who possessed some reputation as a poet and philosopher. This was a decisive experience in his education: his tutor not only guided him toward knowledge of the classics, but also exposed him to the methods and perspectives of “new science”; Caloprese had returned to Calabria from Naples, where he had frequented the Accademia degli Investiganti (Academy of Investigators), which diffused the ideas of Galileo, Descartes, and Pierre Gassendi throughout southern Italy.

In 1680, Gravina moved to Naples to undertake legal studies, during which he turned particularly to the great humanists of the sixteenth century, both jurists and scholars. At the same time, he perfected himself in Greek at the school of Gregorio Messere He quickly entered into the most forward-thinking cultural circles of the capital, represented in the sphere of law by the followers of Francesco D'Andrea. Naples was a center for the intersection and comparison of different philosophical and religious tendencies. These included polemics against neo-Aristotelian and Thomist traditions, as well as against Jansenistic, quietistic, and anti-Jesuitic trends. Gravina's first printed work was consequently of a moral and religious character: Hydra mistica (1691), from which minor works drawing on the same material followed.

In Naples, meanwhile, he had earned the favor of Cardinal Antonio Pignatelli (the future pope Innocent XII), who in 1689, requested that he come to Rome as one of his agents. To the slightly stifling climate of the Roman capital in those years, Gravina brought a breath of the lively debates in which he had participated in Naples. In 1690, he was among the founders of Rome's Academy of Arcadia. In Rome, which had now become his base, he composed between 1692 and 1696 numerous writings that were literary in nature or characterized either by historical scholarship or by moral or aesthetic criticism, and that were for the most part united in the various Opuscula, dedicated to Innocent XII (1696). He also received several public appointments, including in 1699 the chairmanship of the faculty of Civil Law at La Sapienza University, during the reorganization and reinvigoration of the university, which had been rather inactive until that point. In 1703, he transferred to the chair of Canon Law. From Innocent XII Gravina received the offer of various ecclesiastical honors, but declined them from a disinclination to enter the clerical profession.

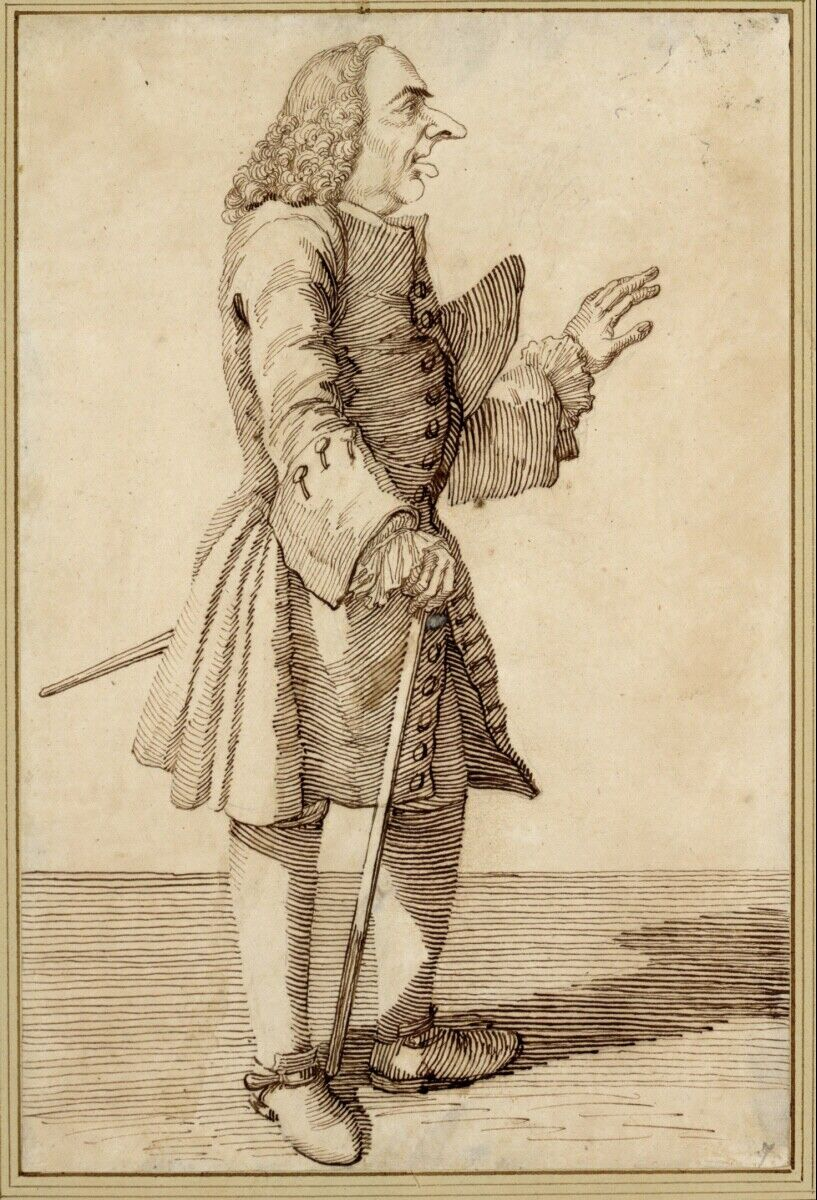
Caricature of Giovanni Vincenzo Gravina by Pier Leone Ghezzi

His openness to the currents of European thought brought on more than a few disputes with more conservative groups in the Curia, which he often resolved only with much effort. In 1701 Gravina published the first draft of his principal work, Originum juris civilis libri tres, which was completed in 1704, appeared in a definitive edition in Leipzig in 1708, and has been reprinted several times. Appreciated in all Europe, the Origines became a standard reference until the nineteenth century on the history of Roman law and on the theme of the relationships between natural rights and the historicity of rights. Gravina's literary interests, his contributions in aesthetic theory, and his interests in historical scholarship were all expressed in the same period in an abundance of writings: among the principal works, the Ragion poetica (1708) and a collection of Orationes (1712) are particularly significant. In 1711, a schism occurred in the Academy of Arcadia, and Gravina and his followers founded in opposition to it the Academy of Quirina.

The years 1714-16, he spent in Calabria resting and attending to the inheritance bequeathed him by Caloprese. In his final years Gravina continued to publish on legal and literary subjects and even wrote tragedies, which were in their time much appreciated. He also reestablished contacts in the Neapolitan circle, traveling frequently to the capital of the Kingdom of Naples and publishing various works there. He died in 1718 in Rome. Comforting him at his death in 1718 was one of his dearest friends and followers, Pietro Metastasio. Gravina was survived by his mother, to whom he left his property in Calabria. His Roman possessions were left to Metastasio. Among the famous pupils of Gravina were Lorenzo Gori and Orazio Filippo Bianchi.

== Works ==
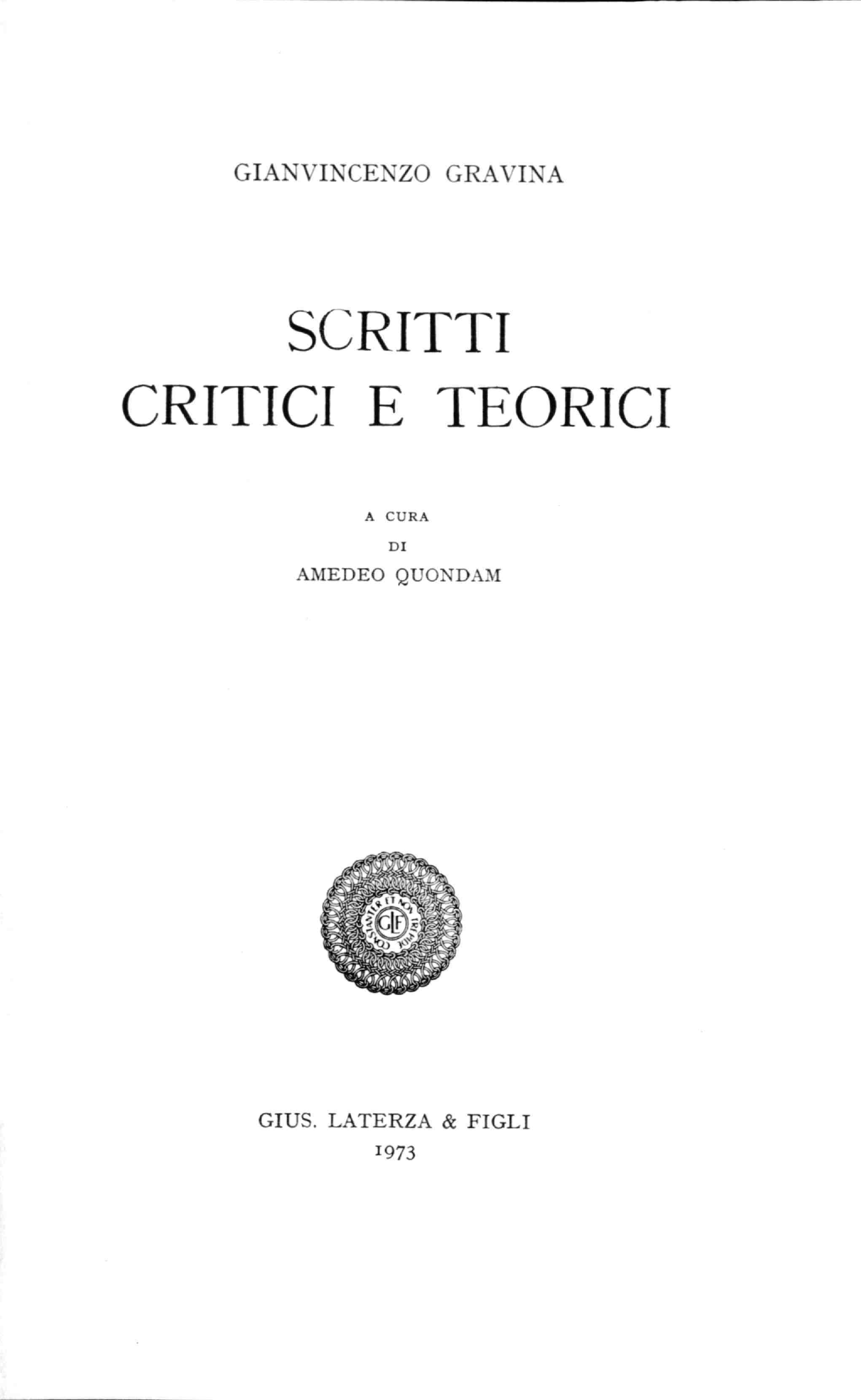
Scritti critici e teorici, 1973

Gravina was the author of a number of works of great erudition, the principal being his Origines juris civilis, completed in 3 vols (1713) and his De Romano imperio (1712). These works went through various editions in Italy and Germany, and a French translation of the Origines was published by J. B. Requier in 1766.

The work of Gravina that is best remembered is his discourse on poetry, first published in 1708: Della Ragion Poetica libri due, in which he defines poetry as an intuitive and imaginative form of knowledge with the power to inspire civic renewal. Gravina seeks to pioneer poetics as a science deduced from rational first principles and conceives poetry itself as a rudimentary and imperfect form of cognition through which philosophical truth is transmitted by means of image and emotion. In this and in his preference for the primitive (Homer and Dante) over the refined (Virgil and Torquato Tasso), he points distantly towards Vico's The New Science (1725).

== See also ==
- Lodovico Sergardi
- Manuel Martí

== Bibliography ==
- Gravina, Gian Vincenzo (1973). Scritti critici e teorici. Scrittori d'Italia 255. Roma-Bari: Laterza.
- San Mauro, Carla (2002). "GRAVINA, Gian Vincenzo". Dizionario Biografico degli Italiani (in Italian). Vol. 58: Gonzales–Graziani. Rome: Institute of the Italian Encyclopaedia. ISBN 978-88-12-00032-6.
- Gravina, Gianvincenzo (2005). R. Gaetano (ed.). Della Ragion poetica. Soveria Mannelli: Rubbettino. ISBN 978-8849815726.
- San Mauro, Carla (2006). Gianvincenzo Gravina giurista e politico. Con un'appendice di scritti inediti. Milan: FrancoAngeli. ISBN 978-8846474735.
