= Francisco Pérez Bayer =

Spanish philologist (1711–1794)

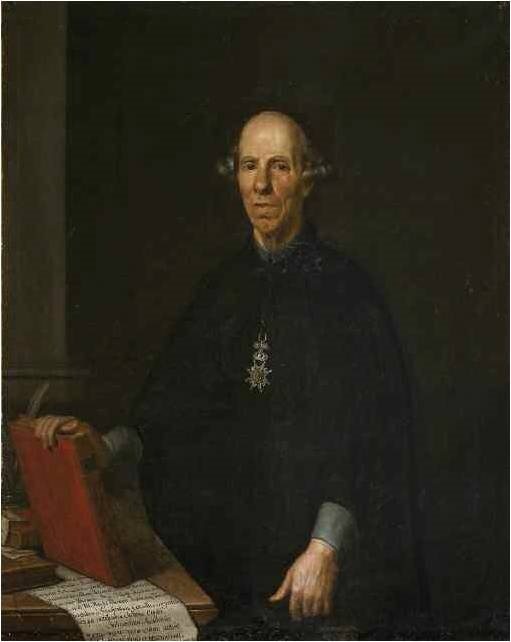
Francisco Pérez Bayer

Francisco Pérez Bayer (1711–1794) was a Spanish philologist, jurist and writer.

== Works ==
- Catalog of the Royal Library of El Escorial. Damaiuis et Laurentius Hispani, Rome, 1756.
- Alphabet and language of the Phoenicians and their colonies, 1772.
- Travel literature. Valencia: Institution Alfonso the Magnanimous, 1998.
- Etymology of the Spanish language.
- Archeological journey from Valencia to Andalusia and Portugal.
- De Numis Hebraeo-Samaritanis, 1781
- From Temple Hebraeorum Toletano
- Institutions of the Hebrew language.
- Origin of Spanish voices derived from Hebrew.
