= Angelo Teodoro Villa =

Italian Catholic scholar (1720–1794)

Angelo Teodoro Villa (1723?–1794?) was an Italian Jesuit priest and scholar, publishing and editing translations from the classics as well as biographies of writers and a text on Eloquence.

== Biography ==
He was born near Pavia. He studied eloquence and classic Greco-Latin literature in Pavia and Milan. In Pavia, he was a member of the scholarly society of the Accademia dei Transformati. He was the tutor of Greek language for Giacomo Trivulzio in Milan. Count Carlo Firmian appointed him Professor of Greco-Latin studies at the University of Pavia, where he wrote about the history of the university.

== Works ==
- Abduction of Helen (Ratto di Elena), Translated into Italian from the original Greek poem by Coluthus, based on a manuscript in the Biblioteca Ambrosiana (Milan, 1749, in octavo)
- Lezioni d' eloquenza, (Pavia, 1780, in octavo).
- Della Presa di Troia, (Modena, 1774), dedicated to Count Firmian. This Italian work is a translation of the work of Tryphiodorus.
- L'encomio d'Elena translation of the Greek oration by Isocrates
