= Pontifical Academy of Arcadia =

Italian literary academy founded in Rome in 1690

The Accademia degli Arcadi or Accademia dell'Arcadia, "Academy of Arcadia" or "Academy of the Arcadians", is an Italian literary academy founded in Rome in 1690. The full Italian official name was Pontificia Accademia degli Arcadi.

Established in honor of Queen Christina of Sweden by members of her Roman intellectual circle, the academy sought to reform Italian poetry by opposing the ornamental excesses of Marinist verse in the Baroque period with a return to classical simplicity, drawing inspiration from Greco-Roman pastoral literature. Each member assumed a pastoral pseudonym, and unlike most learned societies of the period, the academy admitted women.

Shortly after its founding, the academy grew to number over 1,300 members and established colonies across Italy. Its most celebrated member was the librettist and lyric poet Pietro Metastasio, widely regarded as the highest exponent of the Arcadian movement. Goethe was admitted in 1786, and George Frideric Handel was a frequent attendant during his years in Italy.

The academy survives to the present day, and membership is considered prestigious. In 1925, it was renamed the Arcadia Accademia Letteraria Italiana (Arcadia Italian Literary Academy) and continues to operate as a historical institute promoting literary criticism.

== History ==
=== Foundation ===
The beginnings of the Accademia degli Arcadi date to February 1656, when a literary circle formed under the patronage of Queen Christina of Sweden, who had abdicated the Swedish crown in 1654, converted to Catholicism, and taken up her residence in Rome, where she spent much of the rest of her life. There she became a significant patron of literature, science and music, with composers including Alessandro Scarlatti, Alessandro Stradella and Arcangelo Corelli dedicating works to her.

Christina died in 1689, surrounded by a group of admiring members of Rome's intelligentsia, desirous of opposing the complexities of Baroque culture with a return to classical simplicity and directness. They applauded her desire to get back to basic (and classical) literary values of sincerity and simplicity in an Italy which, she believed, was allowing its national heritage to waste and decay, because of that Baroque concentration on over-ingenious conceits to the detriment of meaningful content. In 1689, a group of intellectuals belonging to Christina's circle established the academy in her memory and elected her as its symbolic head (basilissa, the Greek term for 'Queen'). For the next two hundred years, the Academy remained a leading cultural institution.

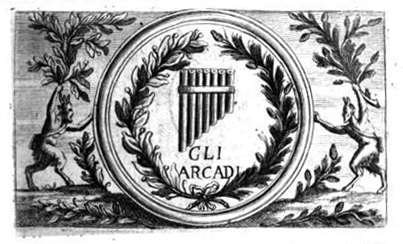
Stamp of the Academy of Arcadia

The first solemn gathering of the Arcadians was held on the Janiculum hill, in a wood belonging to the Reformed Minorites, on 5 October 1690. The Accademia degli Arcadi was so-called because its principal intention was to reform the diction of Italian poetry, which the founders believed had become corrupt through over-indulgence in the ornamentation of the baroque style. Under the inspiration of pastoral literature, the conventions of which imagined the life of shepherds, originally supposed to have lived in Arcadia in the golden age, divinely inspired in poetry by the Muses, Apollo, Hermes and Pan, the Academy chose as its emblem the pipe of Pan with its seven unequal reeds.

The fourteen founders selected Giovanni Mario Crescimbeni as the first Custode di Arcadia or president of the academy. He was the author of a history of Italian poetry and of various literary works. The Arcadians resolved to return to the fields of truth, always singing of subjects of pastoral simplicity and drawing their inspiration from Greco-Roman bucolic poetry. The ideal parameters for the artistic work were simplicity and a sense of measure and beauty. Common to all the poets was the desire to oppose the poetry of the Marinists, and return to classic poetry, embracing also the recent rationalist influence of Descartes. Norms and rituals of the academy took their cue from classic and pastoral mythology, as in the custom of assuming 'pastoral' names (Crescimbeni, for example, chose that of 'Alfesibeo Cario').

=== Orsini Gardens & Beyond ===
In 1692, the meetings were transferred to the gardens of Duke Orsini on the Esquiline hill; in 1696, to the Farnese Gardens on the Palatine. Finally, the generosity of John V of Portugal, one of its members under the name of Arete Melleo, enabled the society to secure (1723) on the Janiculum a site known as the Bosco Parrasio or (Parrasian Grove). Here they held their meetings on summer days, in winter moving to the Teatro degli Arcadi in the Palazzo Salviati. In 1696 the Accademia admitted seven musicians including Giovanni Bononcini.

While the academy was still on the Palatine, its Statuto or Constitution was drawn up. This constitution (the work of co-founder Gian Vincenzo Gravina) was modelled on the ancient Roman laws of the 'Twelve Tables', and was engraved on marble. Differing tendencies soon asserted themselves, following the ideas of the two founders: that of Gravina stood in the tradition of Homer and Dante, while that of Crescimbeni was more influenced by Petrarch. Because of these differences, Gravina left to found the Accademia dei Quirini in 1711. Despite this loss, Arcadia retained its vigour in the following years and created colonies in many cities of Italy. Many noblemen, ecclesiastics, and artists held membership in it to be an honour, and very soon it numbered 1,300.

The celebrated lyric poet and opera librettist Pietro Metastasio (1698–1782), a student of Gravina's and a prominent member of the Academy, is widely regarded as the highest exponent of the movement.

Unlike most learned societies of the period, Arcadia admitted female members. It was the first Italian academy to do so, and several women became prominent writers within the organization, with their works appearing in official publications. One of the first female members of the Academy was the Italian poet Diodata Saluzzo Roero, admitted in 1795, but some evidence does exist for earlier female members. In the 17th century, the poet Maria Antonia Scalera Stellini was elected a member, and the 1721 edition of the Academy's publication included work by Caterina Imperiale Lercari Pallavicini. Margherita Sparapani Gentili Boccapadule was also a member.

=== Anti-Arcadian Reaction ===
A violent anti-Arcadian reaction soon developed, and, starting from the early 19th century, Arcadianism began to be regarded as a late and unconvincing expression of the ancien régime. Severe critics included Giuseppe Baretti, who was fiercely opposed to what he considered the emptiness and fundamentally frivolous quality of the compositions of the Arcadians, while Luigi Settembrini saw the movement as a Jesuitical attempt to reduce the Italian intelligentsia to childish decadence.

After the end of the French Revolution, the Academy strove to renew itself in accord with the spirit of the times, without sacrificing its traditional system of sylvan associations and pastoral names. The Academy no longer represented a literary school, but a general interest in the classics and figures like Dante came to be greatly honoured by its members. Furthermore, the Academy's field of endeavour was enlarged to include many branches of study, including history and archaeology. The new Arcadian revival was marked by the foundation (1819) of the Giornale Arcadico. In 1925 the Academy was renamed to become the Arcadia – Accademia Letteraria Italiana, a historical institute. Arcadia has demonstrated its resilience and its independent stance, not least during the Fascist era, when alone of the Italian academies, it refused to remove Croce's name from its register of fellows. In its modern guise as promoter of literary criticism, its conservative programme shows every sign of outliving the theories of postwar criticism, and currently the Academy has long waiting lists for its keenly contested membership.

=== Legacy ===
The Accademia degli Arcadi counted among its members some of the principal literary men and women of the time, including scholars Francesco Redi, Ludovico Antonio Muratori, Scipione Maffei and Giambattista Vico, librettists Apostolo Zeno, Pietro Metastasio and Paolo Rolli, and linguist Clotilde Tambroni, among others. Some of the leading Italian poets of the eighteenth century, including Giuseppe Parini, Carlo Goldoni and Vittorio Alfieri, were co-opted as members, despite their differences from Arcadian poetic tradition.

The famous composer George Frideric Handel is known to have often attended the meetings and symposia of the Arcadians when studying in Italy, under the patronage of Ruspoli, a leading member of the Academy. Goethe, was welcomed as a member of the Arcadian Academy in 1786. There is an interesting account of the Academy's history and program in his 'Italian Journey'.

The archives of the academy are currently housed in the Biblioteca Angelica, next to the church of Sant'Agostino in Rome. The paintings are housed in the Palazzo Braschi.

=== Assessment ===
Following Baretti, the 19th-century critic Francesco de Sanctis, with his Romantic emphasis on national liberation and patriotic values, reviled what he saw as the uncommitted attitudes of the movement, though he appreciated the technical achievements of some of the Arcadian poets, particularly Metastasio. Giosuè Carducci robustly took up de Sanctis's nationalistic attack, but 20th-century critics, notably Benedetto Croce and Mario Fubini, have concentrated rather on the reforming side of the academy, claiming that without its early revolutionary and enlightened aims, writers such as Goldoni, Alfieri, and Parini would not so easily have been able to achieve their particular originality; and that it helped enlightened critics, such as Gravina and Muratori, to lay down critical rules for judging and defining literary and particularly poetic creations. Nor perhaps would it have been so easy for Italian cultural, or at least literary, nationalism to make itself heard through the literary histories of Crescimbeni (Istoria della volgar poesia) and of Tiraboschi (Storia della letteratura italiana), which led directly to the patriotic history of Italian literature created by de Sanctis.
