= Puteanus =

Puteanus may refer to:

- Pierre Dupuy (scholar), otherwise known as Puteanus (1582 - 1651), a French scholar, the son of the humanist and bibliophile Claude Dupuy
- Erycius Puteanus (1574 - 1646), a humanist and philologist from the Low Countries
