= Lectionary 163 =

Lectionary ℓ 163
- New Testament manuscript
- Text: Apostolarion
- Date: 14th century
- Script: Greek
- Now at: Biblioteca Vallicelliana
- Size: 23 by 16.1 cm

Lectionary 163, designated by siglum ℓ 163 (in the Gregory-Aland numbering) is a Greek manuscript of the New Testament, on parchment leaves. Paleographically it has been assigned to the 14th century.

Formerly, it was labelled was Lectionary 46^{a}.

== Description ==
The codex contains weekday Apostolos lessons (Acts and Epistles) from Easter to Pentecost and Saturday/Sunday Gospel lessons for the other weeks lectionary (Apostolarion) with lacunae. It is written in Greek minuscule letters, on 153 parchment leaves (23 by 16.1 cm), in one column per page, 27-28 lines per page. It contains music notes.

== History ==
The manuscript was bought in 1606, Corneliani in Iapygia (as ℓ 103).

The manuscript is not cited in the critical editions of the Greek New Testament (UBS3).

Currently the codex is located in the Biblioteca Ambrosiana (C. 63 sup) at Milan.

== See also ==
- List of New Testament lectionaries
- Biblical manuscript
- Textual criticism
