= Ambrosian Iliad =

Fifth-century AD Homeric manuscript

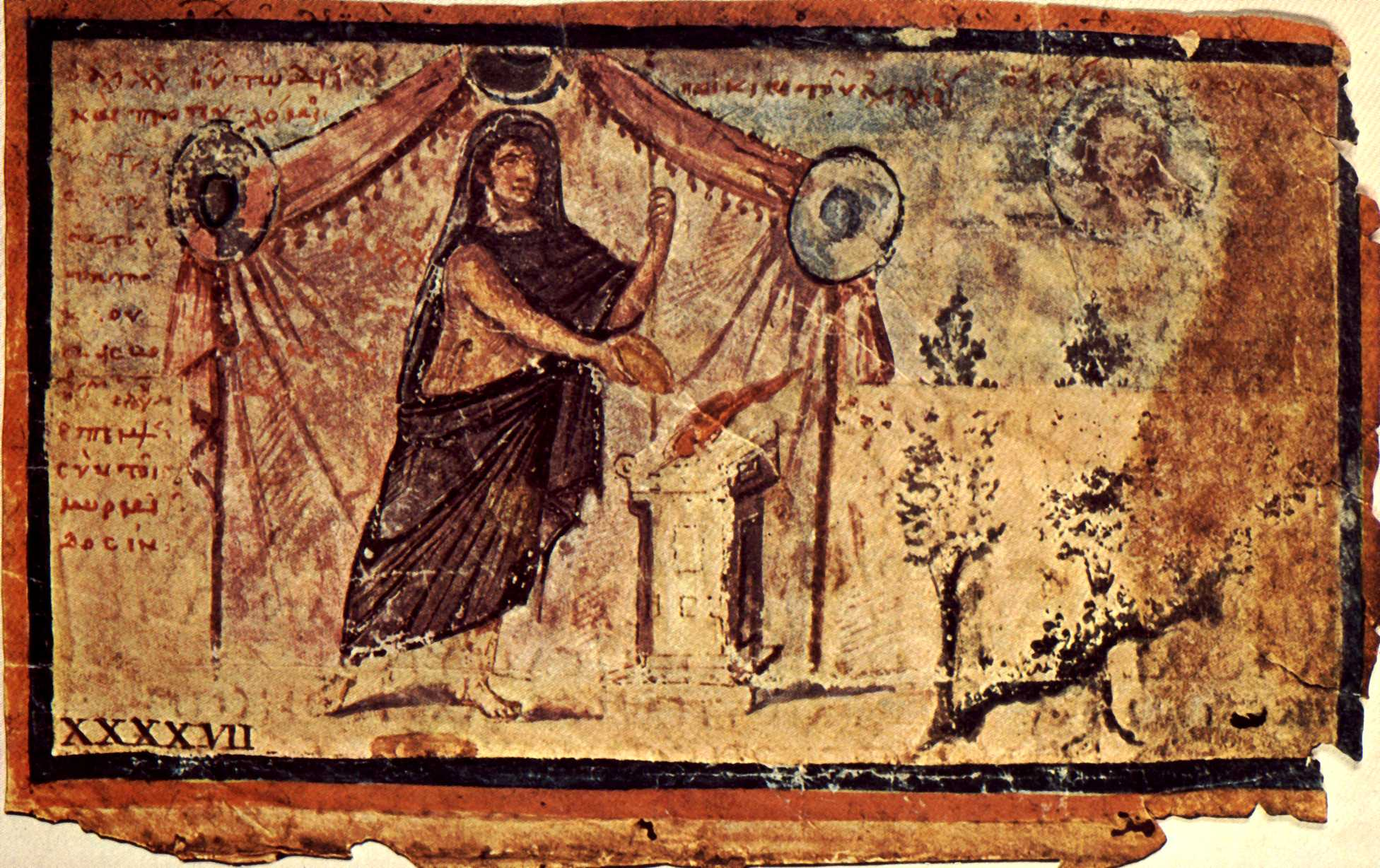
Achilles sacrificing to Zeus, folios XXXXVII

The Ambrosian Iliad or Ilias Picta (Milan, Biblioteca Ambrosiana, Cod. F. 205 Inf.) is a 5th-century illuminated manuscript on vellum, which depicts the entirety of Homer's Iliad, including battle scenes and noble scenes. It is considered unique due to being the only set of ancient illustrations that depict scenes from the Iliad. The Ambrosian Iliad consists of 52 miniatures, each labeled numerically. It is thought to have been created in Alexandria, given the flattened and angular Hellenistic figures, which are considered typical of Alexandrian late antique art and of late antique literature, in approximately 500 AD, possibly by multiple artists. The author(s) first drew the figures nude and then painted the clothes on, much like in Greek vase painting. In the 11th century, the miniatures were cut out of the original manuscript and pasted into a Siculo-Calabrian codex of Homeric texts.

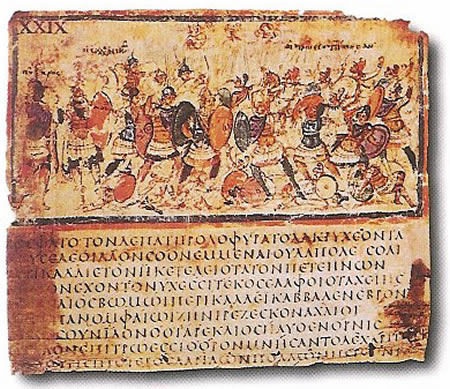
Example of Greek Uncial Text, folios XXIX

Comparisons of texts per page to other late antique manuscripts (Vatican Vergil, Vienna Genesis) has led some to speculate these miniatures were originally part of a large manuscript. This manuscript was unlike other illuminated manuscripts in its lack of gilding. Instead, the author(s) chose yellow ochre to represent gold within the individual images, i.e. the gold cuirasses of noble figures, and the halo of Zeus (folios XXXIV).

Cardinal Angelo Mai, librarian of the Ambrosiana in the early 1800s, became convinced that the manuscript was from the 3rd century, and therefore philologically extremely important. He labelled the miniatures, and applied harsh chemicals to the manuscript in an attempt to improve the legibility of the text. His actions caused the miniatures' colors to bleed through the pages and left them in the damaged state they are in today.

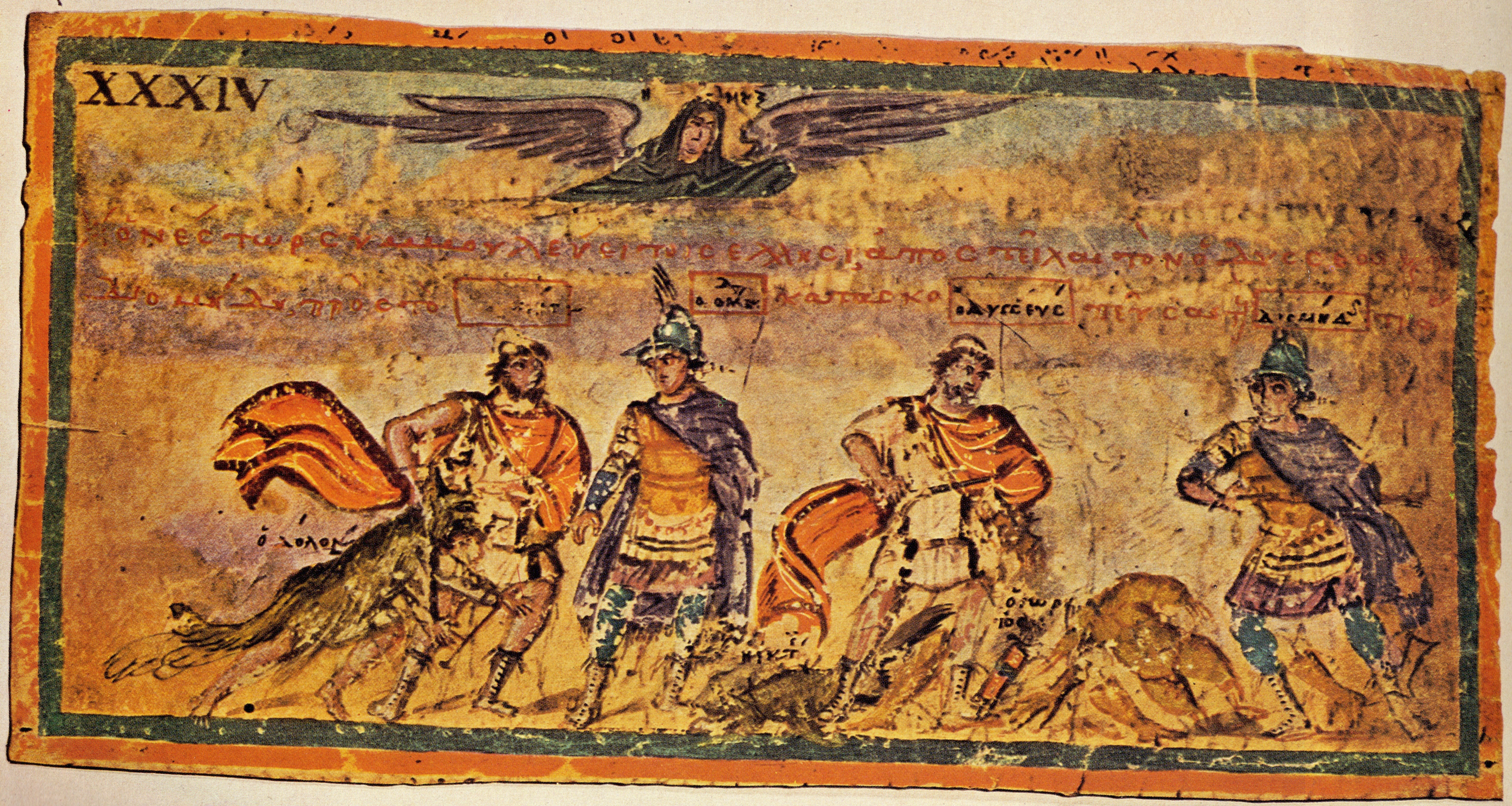
The Capture of Dolon, folios XXXIV

Today the Ambrosian Iliad is held in the Biblioteca Ambrosiana in Milan, Lombardy, Italy, which is also the manuscript's namesake. It was purchased from Genoese collector Gian Vincenzo Pinelli's library and added, by the famed Cardinal Federico Borromeo, to the Biblioteca Ambrosiana on June 14, 1608. The manuscript's images can be viewed on the Warburg Institute Iconographic Database.
