= Lectionary 292 =

Lectionary ℓ 292
- New Testament manuscript
- Text: Evangelistarium †
- Date: 9th century
- Script: Greek
- Now at: Carpentras
- Size: 35.5 cm by 26.5 cm
- Type: Byzantine text-type

Lectionary 292, designated by siglum ℓ 292 (in the Gregory-Aland numbering) is a Greek manuscript of the New Testament, on parchment. Palaeographically it has been assigned to the 9th century. Scrivener labelled it as 189^{e}.

== Description ==
The codex contains lessons from the Gospel of John, Matthew, and Luke (Evangelistarium), on 277 parchment leaves (35.5 cm by 26.5 cm). The first Gospel lesson begins in John 16:28.

The text is written in Greek uncial letters, in two columns per page, 24 lines per page. The manuscript contains weekday Gospel lessons. It contains music notes, the initial letters are rubricated. It contains subscriptions.

In Matthew 23:8 it has reading from prima manu καθηγητης, the corrector changed it into διδασκαλος (teacher). The first reading is supported by the manuscripts: Codex Sinaiticus, Bezae, Regius, Koridethi, 1010, 1241, 1424, Byz. The second reading is supported by the manuscripts: Sinaiticus^{1}, Vaticanus, 33, 892.

It lacks the Pericope Adulterae (John 8:1-11).

== History ==
Scholz dated the manuscript to the 6th century, Scrivener and Gregory dated it to the 10th century. It is presently assigned by the INTF to the 9th century.

Epiphanius Magister Paschales presented the manuscript in 1091 to the monastery of the Birth of God. It was housed in Cyprus (between 1438 and 1605).

The manuscript was examined by Constantin von Tischendorf in 1843, who gave some extracts from the codex in his Anecdota.

The manuscript was added to the list of New Testament manuscripts by Scrivener (number 189^{e}) and Gregory (number 292^{e}). Gregory saw the manuscript in 1884.

The manuscript is cited in the critical editions of the Greek New Testament (UBS3).

Currently the codex is housed at the Bibliothèque municipale, 10 (L 11) in Carpentras.

== See also ==
- List of New Testament lectionaries
- Biblical manuscript
- Textual criticism
- Lectionary 291

== Bibliography ==
- C. v. Tischendorf, Anecdota sacra et profana ex Oriente et Occidente allata (1861), pp. 151–153.
- Gregory, Caspar René (1900). Textkritik des Neuen Testaments. Vol. 1. Leipzig: J.C. Hinrichs’sche Buchhandlung. p. 412.
