= Lectionary 106 =

Lectionary ℓ 106
- New Testament manuscript
- Text: Evangelistarion
- Date: 13th-century
- Script: Greek
- Now at: Biblioteca Ambrosiana
- Size: 28 cm by 23 cm
- Hand: splendidly written

Lectionary 106, designated by siglum ℓ 106 (in the Gregory-Aland numbering) is a Greek manuscript of the New Testament, on parchment leaves. Palaeographically, it has been assigned to the 13th century.

== Description ==
The codex contains lessons from the Gospels of John, Matthew, Luke lectionary (Evangelistarium) with some lacunae. It is written in Greek minuscule letters, on 349 parchment leaves (28 cm by 23 cm), in two columns per page, 20 lines per page, and is splendidly written in a large cursive hand. Some leaves were supplemented in the 16th century on paper.

== History ==
The manuscript was used in Constantinople. It was bought in Korfu and came to Milan. It was added to the list of New Testament manuscripts by Scholz, who examined some parts of it.

The manuscript is not cited in the critical editions of the Greek New Testament (UBS3).

Currently, the codex is located in the Biblioteca Ambrosiana (C. 891 sup.) in Milan.

== See also ==
- List of New Testament lectionaries
- Biblical manuscript
- Textual criticism

== Bibliography ==
- Gregory, Caspar René (1900). Textkritik des Neuen Testaments. Vol. 1. Leipzig: J.C. Hinrichs. p. 396.
