= Lectionary 105 =

Lectionary ℓ 105
- New Testament manuscript
- Text: Evangelistarion
- Date: 13th-century
- Script: Greek
- Now at: Biblioteca Ambrosiana
- Size: 25.4 cm by 18 cm

Lectionary 105, designated by siglum ℓ 105 (in the Gregory-Aland numbering) is a Greek manuscript of the New Testament, on parchment leaves. Palaeographically it has been assigned to the 13th-century.

== Description ==
The codex contains lessons from the Gospels of John, Matthew, Luke lectionary (Evangelistarium) with some lacunae. It is written in Greek minuscule letters, on 157 parchment leaves (25.4 cm by 18 cm), in 2 columns per page, 20 lines per page. It was carefully written. The first 19 leaves were supplemented in the 16th century on paper.

== History ==
The manuscript once belonged to presbyter Andreas. It was in Korfu. It was added to the list of New Testament manuscripts by Scholz, who examined some parts of it.

The manuscript is not cited in the critical editions of the Greek New Testament (UBS3).

Currently the codex is located in the Biblioteca Ambrosiana (M. 81 sup.) in Milan.

== See also ==
- List of New Testament lectionaries
- Biblical manuscript
- Textual criticism

== Bibliography ==
- Gregory, Caspar René (1900). Textkritik des Neuen Testaments. Vol. 1. Leipzig: J.C. Hinrichs. p. 396.
