= Lectionary 104 =

Lectionary ℓ 104
- New Testament manuscript
- Text: Evangelistarion, Apostolos
- Date: 12th-century
- Script: Greek
- Now at: Biblioteca Ambrosiana
- Size: 29 cm by 21.5 cm

Lectionary 104, designated by siglum ℓ 104 (in the Gregory-Aland numbering) is a Greek manuscript of the New Testament, on parchment leaves. Palaeographically it has been assigned to the 12th-century.

== Description ==
The codex contains lessons for every day from the Gospels of John, Matthew, Luke, from Acts of the Apostles and Epistles lectionary (Evangelistarium and Apostolos) with lacunae at the beginning and end. It is written in Greek minuscule letters, on 128 parchment leaves (29 cm by 21.5 cm), in 2 columns per page, 23 lines per page. It contains a lot of pictures.

== History ==
The manuscript was brought in 1607 from Calabria to Milan. .It was added to the list of New Testament manuscripts by Scholz, who examined some parts of it.

The manuscript is not cited in the critical editions of the Greek New Testament (UBS3).

Currently the codex is located in the Biblioteca Ambrosiana (D. 72 sup.) in Milan.

== See also ==
- List of New Testament lectionaries
- Biblical manuscript
- Textual criticism
