= Lectionary 102 =

Lectionary ℓ 102
- New Testament manuscript
- Text: Evangelistarion
- Date: 1370
- Script: Greek
- Now at: Biblioteca Ambrosiana
- Size: 27.9 cm by 21.9 cm

Lectionary 102, designated by siglum ℓ 102 (in the Gregory-Aland numbering) – formerly ℓ 102a – is a Greek manuscript of the New Testament, on paper leaves. It is dated by a colophon to the year 1370.

== Description ==
The codex contains Lessons from the Gospels of John, Matthew, Luke lectionary (Evangelistarium) with a commentary. The text is written in Greek minuscule letters, on 116 paper leaves (27.9 cm by 21.9 cm), in 1 column per page, 35 lines per page. According to Burgon it contains commentarii incerti auctoris in omnia Evangelia quae per annum in Ecclesia Graeca leguntur.

== Lectionary 2307 ==
The same manuscript contains four parchment leaves, two at beginning and two at end, written in 24 lines per page, from the 13th century. They are classified now as Lectionary 2307, and they were designated by siglum ℓ 2307 (formerly as ℓ 102b).

== History ==
The manuscript was written by Stephanus, a priest. It was bought in 1606 in Taranto. It was added to the list of New Testament manuscripts by Scholz, who examined some parts of it.

The manuscript is not cited in the critical editions of the Greek New Testament (UBS3).

Currently the codex is located in the Biblioteca Ambrosiana (S. 62 sup.) in Milan.

== See also ==
- List of New Testament lectionaries
- Biblical manuscript
- Textual criticism

== Bibliography ==
- J.M.A. Scholz, Biblich-kritische Reise in Frankreich, der Schweiz, Italien, Palästine und im Archipel in den Jahren 1818, 1819, 1820, 1821: Nebst einer Geschichte des Textes des Neuen Testaments (Leipzig, 1823), p. 72.
