= Trésor des Chartes =

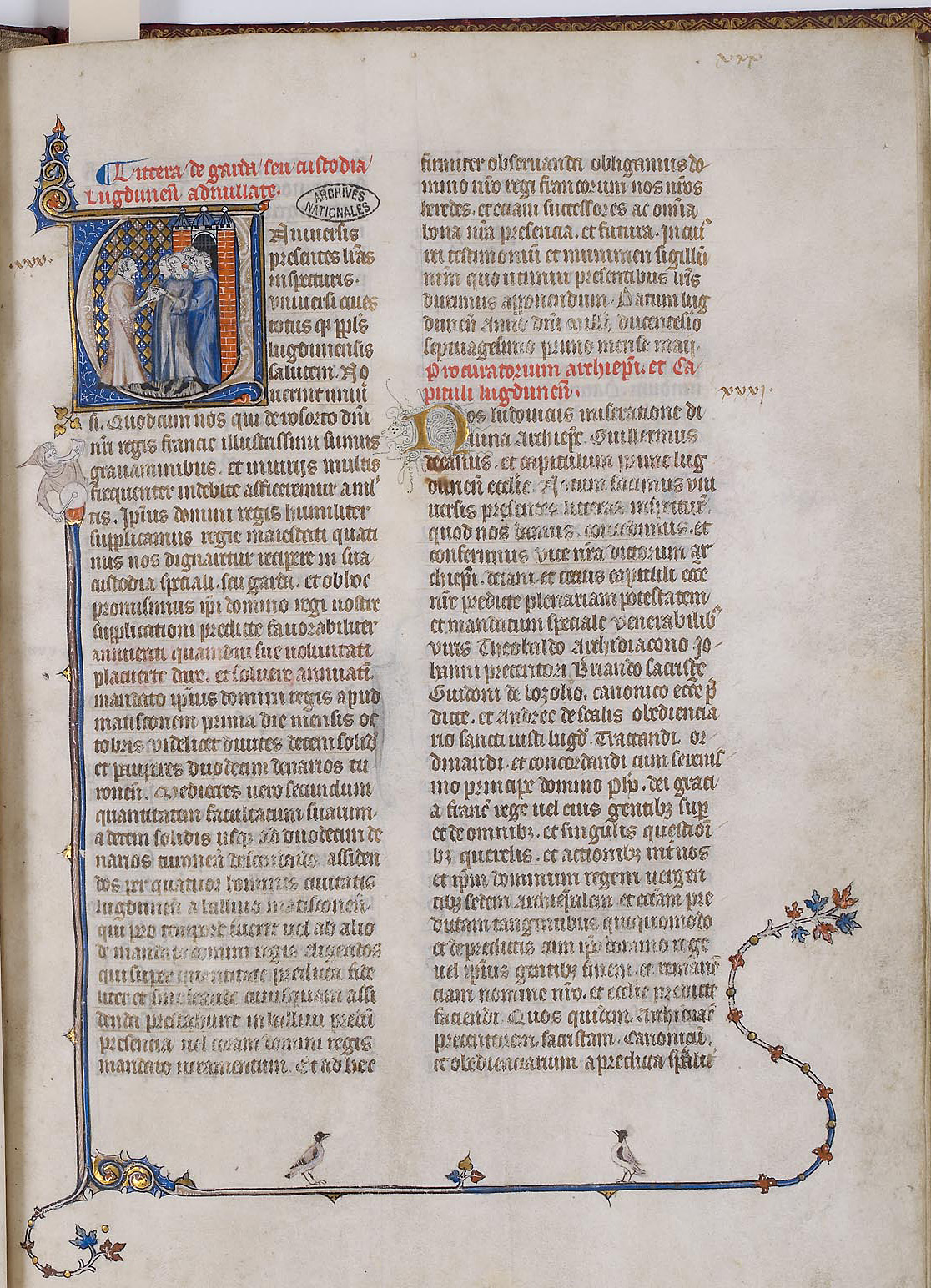
A page of the Registre du Trésor des Chartes

The Trésor des chartes ("Charters treasury", Latin: Thesaurus chartarum et privilegiorum domini regis) are the ancient archives of the French crown. They were spared during the French Revolution and are today stored at the Archives nationales (National Archives of France) in Paris, where they form the J and JJ series, totaling 422 ancient bound volumes (registers) and 1,020 boxes of loose records from the 10th to the late 18th century.

The Trésor des chartes is not, however, the oldest series of records held by the Archives nationales, as that distinction goes to the so-called "Historic Monuments" series (series K and KK), an artificial series of historical records assembled after the French Revolution with archives seized during the French Revolution, in particular those of ancient abbeys and monasteries in the Paris Region closed during the Revolution, which contained archives going as far back as the 7th century (archives of the Abbey of Saint-Denis in particular, necropolis of the kings and queens of France, founded by Dagobert I in the 7th century). The Trésor des Chartes, in contrast to the "Historic Monuments", were strictly secular (lay) archives, and they have preserved their internal Medieval organization as they were not broken up and reordered in different series after the French Revolution, unlike what happened to the archives of the abbeys and monasteries of the Paris Region.

== History ==
On 5 July 1194, Philip II of France was defeated by Richard I of England at the Battle of Fréteval. Philip managed to flee but lost his archives, his treasury and the Royal seal which were captured by Richard.

After the battle, Philip was forced to re-establish the archives of the Kingdom, the registers and the domestic archives of the French crown and he entrusted Grand Chamberlain Gauthier II of Nemours with this mission which led to the creation of the Trésor des chartes, the predecessor of what became the Archives Nationales during the French Revolution in 1790. After Gauthier's death in 1204, Keeper of the Seals Guérin was entrusted with this mission.

From 1231, the documents were stored in the Royal Palace in Paris.

At the end of the reign of Saint Louis, the archives and, from around 1300, the registers of the Chancery were stored on the third floor of a Gothic building built on the side of the Sainte-Chapelle, in the Capetian royal palace compound on the Île de la Cité, above the sacristy of the Sainte-Chapelle, which occupied the 1st and 2nd floors of that building and contained the "treasure" of the Passion relics and some jewels. It was consequently called the Trésor des chartes, the "Charters treasury", in Latin Thesaurus chartarum et privilegiorum domini regis. The Trésor des chartes remained in that Gothic building until its demolition in 1783 to make way for the new neoclassical aisles of the Paris courthouse's formal entrance courtyard, at a time when Gothic architecture was looked down upon.

The archives of Philip IV of France and of his three sons, kings of France, Louis X, Philip V, and Charles IV represent almost a third of the preserved records. The chests that contained these archives were called layettes.

In 1615, Pierre Dupuy was commissioned by Mathieu Molé, first president of the parlement of Paris, to draw up an inventory of the documents of the Trésor des chartes. This work occupied eleven years. His manuscript inventory is preserved in the original and in copy in the Bibliothèque Nationale, and transcriptions are in the national archives in Paris, at the record office in London, and elsewhere.

== See also ==
- Archives nationales
- Himanis Search Interface for the Tresor des Chartes ("Chancery collection")
