= Minuscule 353 =

- New Testament manuscript
- Text: Gospels
- Date: 12th century
- Script: Greek
- Now at: Biblioteca Ambrosiana
- Cite: J. M. A. Scholz, Biblisch-kritische Reise (Leipzig, 1823), p. 70-73.
- Size: 28.2 cm by 21.8 cm
- Type: Byzantine text-type
- Category: V
- Note: full marginalia

Minuscule 353 (in the Gregory-Aland numbering), A^{210} (Soden), is a Greek minuscule manuscript of the New Testament, on parchment. Paleographically it has been assigned to the 12th century. It has full marginalia.

== Description ==
The codex contains the text of the four Gospels on 194 parchment leaves (28.2 cm by 21.8 cm) with some lacunae (Matthew 15:30-16:23; John 21:24.25). The text is written in one column per page, biblical text in 23 lines per page, text of commentary in 59 lines per page. The biblical text is surrounded by the same catena as codex 181.

The text is divided according to the κεφαλαια (chapters), whose numbers are given at the margin, and their τιτλοι (titles of chapters) at the top of the pages. There is also a division according to the Ammonian Sections, with references to the Eusebian Canons (later hand).

It contains lectionary markings at the margin (for liturgical use), and incipits.

== Text ==
The Greek text of the codex is a representative of the Byzantine text-type. Aland placed it in Category V. It was not examined by the Claremont Profile Method.

== History ==
The manuscript probably came from island Barginense. The manuscript was added to the list of New Testament manuscripts by Scholz (1794–1852). Scholz collated major part of the manuscript. C. R. Gregory saw it in 1886.

The manuscript is currently housed at the Biblioteca Ambrosiana (B. 93 sup.) in Milan.

== See also ==
- List of New Testament minuscules
- Biblical manuscript
- Textual criticism
