= Minuscule 345 =

- New Testament manuscript
- Text: Gospels
- Date: 11th century
- Script: Greek
- Now at: Biblioteca Ambrosiana
- Cite: Scholz, Biblisch-kritische Reise (1823)
- Size: 14.8 cm by 11.4 cm
- Type: mixed
- Note: full marginalia

Minuscule 345 (in the Gregory-Aland numbering), ε 119 (Soden), is a Greek minuscule manuscript of the New Testament, on parchment. Paleographically it has been assigned to the 11th century. The manuscript was prepared for Church reading. It has full marginalia.

== Description ==
The codex contains a complete text of the four Gospels on 375 parchment leaves (14.8 cm by 11.4 cm) with only some lacunae (e.g. in Matthew 1:1-10 - the ornamented heading). The text is written in two columns per page, in 15 lines per page.

The text is divided according to the κεφαλαια (chapters), whose numbers are given at the margin, and their τιτλοι (titles of chapters) at the top of the pages. There is also a division according to the smaller Ammonian Sections (in Mark 237 Sections, the last in 16:16), with references to the Eusebian Canons (written below Ammonian Section numbers).

It contains lectionary markings at the margin (for Church reading), subscriptions at the end of each Gospel, with numbers of ρηματα, numbers of στιχοι, numbers of Verses, and portrait of John Evangelist (before Gospel of John). The Synaxarion and Menologion (lacunose) were added by a later hand.

== Text ==
Kurt Aland did not place the Greek text of the codex in any Category. According to the Claremont Profile Method it belongs to the textual cluster 163 in Luke 1, Luke 10, and Luke 20 (fragmentary). It creates textual pair with 163.

== History ==
The manuscript is dated by the INTF to the 11th century.

It was examined by Scholz and Burgon. It was added to the list of New Testament manuscripts by Scholz (1794-1852). C. R. Gregory saw it in 1886.

The manuscript is currently housed at the Biblioteca Ambrosiana (F. 17 sup.) in Milan.

== See also ==
- List of New Testament minuscules
- Biblical manuscript
- Textual criticism
