= Lectionary 290 =

Lectionary ℓ 290
- New Testament manuscript
- Text: Evangelistarium †
- Date: 14th century
- Script: Greek
- Now at: Biblioteca Ambrosiana
- Size: 26.3 cm by 18.2 cm
- Type: Byzantine text-type

Lectionary 290, designated by siglum ℓ 290 (in the Gregory-Aland numbering) is a Greek manuscript of the New Testament, on paper. Palaeographically it has been assigned to the 14th century. Scrivener labelled it as 169^{e}.

Some leaves of the manuscript were lost.

== Description ==
The codex contains lessons from the Gospel of John, Matthew, and Luke (Evangelistarium), on 198 paper leaves (26.3 cm by 18.2 cm), with some lacunae. It contains also several lessons from the Epistles on the leaves 190–193. The leaves of the codex are in disorder.

The text is written in Greek minuscule letters, in one column per page, 23 lines per page. The manuscript contains weekday Gospel lessons for Church reading from Easter to Pentecost and Saturday/Sunday Gospel lessons for the other weeks.

== History ==
Scrivener and Gregory dated the manuscript to the 14th or 15th century. It has been assigned by the Institute for New Testament Textual Research to the 14th century.

It was bought in 1858 for the Biblioteca Ambrosiana.

The manuscript was added to the list of New Testament manuscripts by Scrivener (number 169^{e}) and Gregory (number 290^{e}). Gregory saw the manuscript in 1886.

The manuscript is not cited in the critical editions of the Greek New Testament (UBS3).

The codex is housed at the Biblioteca Ambrosiana (A. 150 sup.) in Milan.

== See also ==
- List of New Testament lectionaries
- Biblical manuscript
- Textual criticism
- Lectionary 289

== Bibliography ==
- Gregory, Caspar René (1900). Textkritik des Neuen Testaments, Vol. 1. Leipzig: J.C. Hinrichs’sche Buchhandlung. p. 412.
