= Minuscule 350 =

- New Testament manuscript
- Text: Gospels
- Date: 11th century
- Script: Greek
- Now at: Biblioteca Ambrosiana
- Cite: Scholz, Biblisch-kritische Reise (1823)
- Size: 19.5 cm by 15.2 cm
- Type: Byzantine text-type
- Category: V
- Note: marginalia

Minuscule 350 is a Greek minuscule manuscript of the New Testament Gospels, written on parchment. It is designated by the siglum 350 in the Gregory-Aland numbering of New Testament manuscripts, and ε 122 in the von Soden numbering of New Testament manuscripts. Using the study of comparative writing styles (palaeography), it has been dated to the 11th century. The manuscript has marginal notes.

== Description ==
The manuscript is a codex (precursor to the modern book format), containing the complete text of the New Testament Gospels, made of 305 parchment leaves (sized 19.5 cm by 15.2 cm), with one gap - John 21:9-25. Though technically still there, the first four paper leaves with the text of Matthew 1:1-4:25 were added in the 16th century. The text is written in one column per page, with 21 lines per page.

The text is divided according to the chapters (known as κεφαλαια / kephalaia), whose numbers are given in the margin, and their titles (known as τιτλοι / titloi) at the top of the pages. There is also a division according to the smaller Ammonian Sections (241 in Mark 234, the last in 16:20). There are however no references to the Eusebian Canons (both early divisions of the Gospels into sections.).

The margins contains lectionary markings (for liturgical use), and portraits of the Evangelists precede each of their respective Gospels (except Matthew). The synaxarion and Menologion were added in the 14th century.

== Text ==
The Greek text is considered to be a representative of the Byzantine text-type. Biblical scholar Kurt Aland placed it in Category V of his New Testament manuscript classification system. Category V manuscripts are described as "manuscripts with a purely or predominantly Byzantine text."

According to the Claremont Profile Method (a specific analysis of textual data), it represents the textual family M350 in Luke 1, Luke 10, and Luke 20. Textual critic Hermann von Soden classified it as part of the textual group K^{ak}.

== History ==
The earliest history of the manuscript is unknown. It was purchased in 1606 in Taranto. It was examined by biblical scholar Johann M .A. Scholz (1794-1852). Scholz also added it to the list of New Testament manuscripts. Biblical scholar Caspar René Gregory saw it in 1886.

It is currently dated by the INTF to the 11th century. It is presently housed at the Biblioteca Ambrosiana (shelf number B. 62 sup.), in Milan.

== See also ==
- List of New Testament minuscules
- Biblical manuscript
- Textual criticism
