= Claude Dupuy (jurist) =

French jurist, humanist and bibliophile (1545–1594)

Claude Dupuy (1545–1594), a jurist, humanist and bibliophile from Paris. He was a leading figure in the circle of French legal humanists and historians that gathered around Jacques Cujas and Jacques-Auguste de Thou. Dupuy (Puteanus) assembled a great library of manuscripts that was inherited by his sons Pierre, a noted scholar himself, and Jacques, but when Jacques died in 1657, the books and manuscripts entered the Royal Collection and are now in the Bibliothèque Nationale, Paris. Codices from his library are identifiable under the title Codex Puteanus. Among his most celebrated manuscripts are the St. Paul's Epistles in Greek and Latin (BN grec 107 & A); a collection of Tironian notes (BN lat 8777). His ninth-century Statius, his Tertullian Apologeticum and his fifth-century codex of Livy's Third Decade were among the group of his manuscripts that came from the Abbey of Corbie, acquired by foul means or fair. "Claude Dupuy was not interested in illuminated manuscripts; he looked for good and correct texts, elegantly written. He read, and sometimes annotated them." He died too young to publish the results of his research, but his long correspondence with Gian Vincenzo Pinelli has been edited by Anna Maria Raugei.
