= Basket of Fruit (Caravaggio) =

Painting by Caravaggio

- Canestra di frutta (Italian)
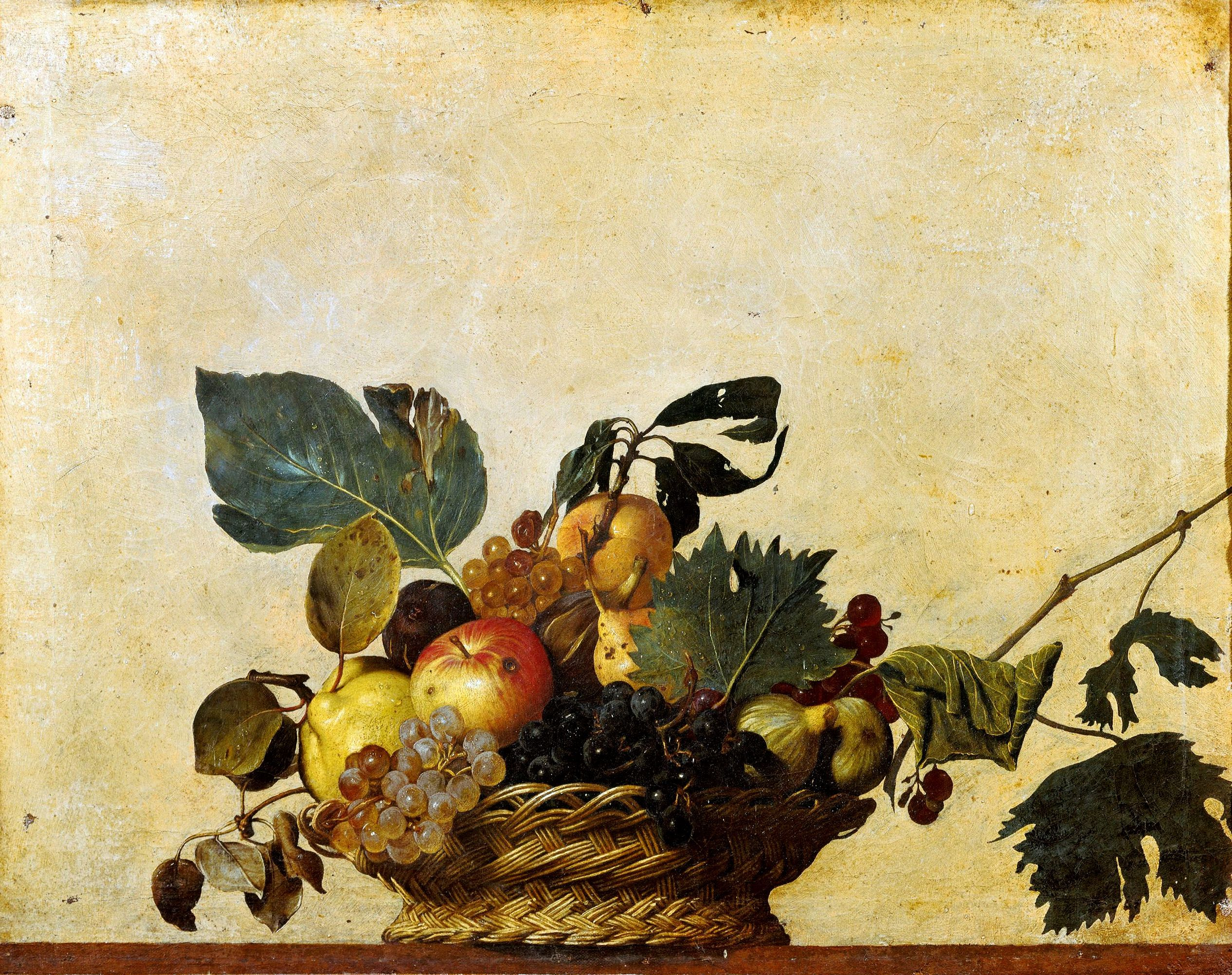
- Artist: Caravaggio
- Year: c. 1599
- Medium: oil on canvas
- Dimensions: 46 cm × 64.5 cm (18 in × 25.4 in)
- Location: Biblioteca Ambrosiana, Milan

Basket of Fruit (c.1599) is a still life painting by the Italian Baroque master Michelangelo Merisi da Caravaggio (1571–1610), which hangs in the Biblioteca Ambrosiana (Ambrosian Library), Milan.

It shows a wicker basket perched on the edge of a ledge. The basket contains a selection of summer fruit:

... a good-sized, light-red peach attached to a stem with wormholes in the leaf resembling damage by oriental fruit moth (Orthosia hibisci). Beneath it is a single bicolored apple, shown from a stem perspective with two insect entry holes, probably codling moth, one of which shows secondary rot at the edge; one blushed yellow pear with insect predations resembling damage by leaf roller (Archips argyospita); four figs, two white and two purple—the purple ones dead ripe and splitting along the sides, plus a large fig leaf with a prominent fungal scorch lesion resembling anthracnose (Glomerella cingulata); and a single unblemished quince with a leafy spur showing fungal spots. There are four clusters of grapes, black, red, golden, and white; the red cluster on the right shows several mummied fruit, while the two clusters on the left each show an overripe berry. There are two grape leaves, one severely desiccated and shriveled while the other contains spots and evidence of an egg mass. In the right part of the basket are two green figs and a ripe black one is nestled in the rear on the left. On the sides of the basket are two disembodied shoots: to the right is a grape shoot with two leaves, both showing severe insect predations resembling grasshopper feeding; to the left is a floating spur of quince or pear.

Much has been made of the worm-eaten, insect-predated, and generally less than perfect condition of the fruit. In line with the culture of the age, the general theme appears to revolve about the fading beauty, and the natural decaying of all things. Scholars also describe the basket of fruit as a metaphor of the Church.

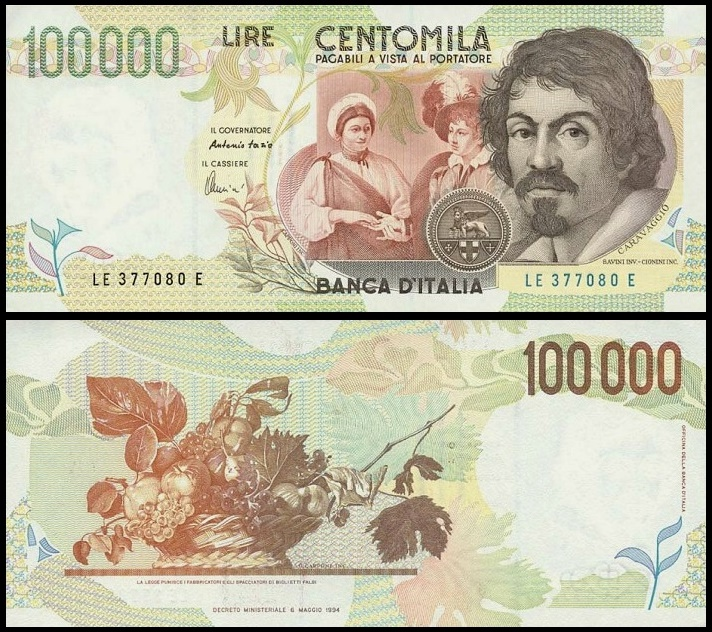
Italian lira banknote, 1990 issue

A recent X-ray study revealed that it was painted on an already used canvas painted with grotesques in the style of Caravaggio's friend Prospero Orsi, who helped the artist in his first breakthrough into the circles of collectors such as his first patron, Cardinal Francesco Maria del Monte, around 1594/1595, and who remained close to him for many years thereafter.

Scholars have had more than their usual level of disagreement in assigning a date to the painting: John T. Spike places it in 1596; Catherine Puglisi believes that 1601 is more probable; and practically every year in between has been advanced. Puglisi's reasoning seem solid, (the basket in this painting seems identical with the one in the first of Caravaggio's two versions of Supper at Emmaus - even the quince seems to be the same piece of fruit), but no consensus has emerged.

In 1607 it was part of Cardinal Federico Borromeo’s collection, a provenance which raises the plausibility of a conscious reference to the Book of Amos. Borromeo, who was archbishop of Milan, was in Rome approximately 1597-1602 and a house guest of del Monte in 1599. He had a special interest in the Northern European painters such as Paul Bril and Jan Brueghel the Elder, who were also in Rome at the time, (indeed, he took Breughel into his own household), and in the way they did landscapes and flowers in paintings as subjects in their own right, something not known at the time in Italian art. He would have seen the way Caravaggio did still life as incidental accessories in paintings such as Boy Bitten by a Lizard, Bacchus, in del Monte's collection, and The Lute Player in the collection of del Monte's friend Vincenzo Giustiniani. The scholarly Giustiniani wrote a treatise on painting years later, wherein, reflecting the hierarchical conventions of his day, he placed flowers "and other tiny things" only fifth on a twelve-scale register, but he said also that Caravaggio once said to him "that it used to take as much workmanship for him to do a good picture of flowers as it did to do one of human figures."

Like its doppelganger in Supper at Emmaus, the basket seems to teeter on the edge of the picture-space, in danger of falling out of the painting and into the viewer's space instead. In the Supper this is a dramatic device, part of the way in which Caravaggio creates the tension of the scene; here, trompe-l'œil seems to be almost the whole purpose of the painting, if we subtract the possible didactic element. But the single element that no doubt attracted its original owner, and still catches attention today, is the extraordinary quasi-photographic realism of the observation which underlies the illusionism. Basket of Fruit can be compared with the same artist's Still Life with Fruit (c. 1603), a painting which John Spike identifies as "the source of all subsequent Roman still-life paintings."

== See also ==
- List of paintings by Caravaggio

== Bibliography ==
- Müller, Jürgen: Der Judaskuss der Malerei. Subversive Bildstrategien im Werk von Michelangelo Merisi da Caravaggio, Leiden 2026, pp. 140-147 ISBN 978-90-04-75847-6
- Puglisi, Catherine. 1998. Caravaggio. ISBN 978-0-7148-3966-0
- Robb, Peter. 1998. [M]: The Man Who Became Caravaggio. ISBN 978-1-876631-79-6
- Spike, John T. 2001. Caravaggio. ISBN 978-0-7892-0639-8
