= Minuscule 351 =

- New Testament manuscript
- Text: Gospels
- Date: 12th century
- Script: Greek-Latin
- Now at: Biblioteca Ambrosiana
- Cite: J. M. A. Scholz, Biblisch-kritische Reise (Leipzig, 1823)
- Size: 21.6 cm by 15.6 cm
- Type: Byzantine text-type
- Category: V
- Note: marginalia

Minuscule 351 (in the Gregory-Aland numbering), ε 228 (Soden), is a Greek minuscule manuscript of the New Testament, on parchment. Paleographically it has been assigned to the 12th century. It has marginalia.

== Description ==
The codex contains a complete text of the four Gospels on 268 parchment leaves (21.6 cm by 15.6 cm) with only one lacuna (John 21:9-25). It is written in one column per page, in 22 lines per page.

The text is divided according to the Ammonian Sections (Mark 233 Sections, the last section in 16:8), whose numbers are given at the margin, wit references to the Eusebian Canons (written below Ammonian Section numbers).

It contains the Epistula ad Carpianum, Eusebian tables, tables of the κεφαλαια (tables of contents) before each Gospel, and subscriptions at the end of each Gospel.

In the 15th century in many places of the codex was inserted a Latin version between lines of the Greek text.

== Text ==
The Greek text of the codex is a representative of the Byzantine text-type. Hermann von Soden classified it to the textual family Family K^{x}. Aland placed it in Category V. According to the Claremont Profile Method it represents the textual family K^{x} in Luke 1.

== History ==
The manuscript was added to the list of New Testament manuscripts by Scholz (1794-1852). It was examined by Dean Burgon. C. R. Gregory saw it in 1886.

The manuscript is currently housed at the Biblioteca Ambrosiana (B. 70 sup.) in Milan.

== See also ==
- List of New Testament minuscules
- Biblical manuscript
- Textual criticism
