= Minuscule 615 =

- New Testament manuscript
- Text: Catholic epistles, and Pauline epistles
- Date: 15th century
- Script: Greek
- Now at: Biblioteca Ambrosiana
- Size: 24.8 cm by 17.1 cm
- Type: mixed
- Category: none

Minuscule 615 (in the Gregory-Aland numbering), α 560 (von Soden), is a Greek minuscule manuscript of the New Testament, on paper. Palaeographically it has been assigned to the 15th century. Tischendorf labeled it by 138^{a} and 173^{p}.

== Description ==
The codex contains the text of the Pauline epistles and Catholic epistles on 202 paper leaves (size 24.8 cm by 17.1 cm). The text is written in one column per page, 19 lines per page.

The order of books: Pauline epistles and Catholic epistles. Hebrews is placed after Epistle to Philemon. It contains Martyrium Pauli.

== Text ==
Aland the Greek text of the codex did not place in any Category.

== History ==
The manuscript once belonged to J. P. Pinelli.

The manuscript was added to the list of New Testament manuscripts by Johann Martin Augustin Scholz. Scholz examined it very slightly. Gregory saw the manuscript in 1886.

Formerly it was labeled by 138^{a} and 173^{p}. In 1908 Gregory gave the number 615 to it.

The manuscript currently is housed at the Biblioteca Ambrosiana (E. 102 sup.), at Milan.

== See also ==
- List of New Testament minuscules
- Biblical manuscript
- Textual criticism
