= Giuseppe Antonio Sassi =

Italian librarian and literary scholar (1675–1751)

Doctor Giuseppe Antonio Sassi
- Born: February 28, 1675; Milan, Duchy of Milan
- Died: 21 April 1751 (aged 76); Milan, Duchy of Milan
- Occupations: Catholic priest, librarian, literary scholar

Academic work
- Discipline: Medieval history
- Sub-discipline: History of Milan
- Institutions: Biblioteca Ambrosiana

Giuseppe Antonio Sassi, Latin: Saxius (28 February 1675 – 21 April 1751), was an Italian librarian and literary scholar.

== Biography ==
Giuseppe Antonio Sassi was born in Milan on February 28, 1675, to a patrician family. After completing his studies, he joined the congregation of the Oblates of Saints Ambrose and Charles and taught literature. After receiving his doctorate at the Ambrosian College, he was appointed rector in 1711 and curator of the famous library founded by Cardinal Federico Borromeo. Sassi took an active part in the most important literary undertakings. He contributed to the publication of Muratori's Rerum italicarum Scriptores with notes and essays and with transcripts from the manuscripts in the Ambrosian library, including History of the Goths by Jordanes, the Chronicles of Landulf the Younger, Ottone & Acerbo Morena's City of Lodi, the Life of Dolcino, a Novarese heresiarch, and of the History of the Visconti, by Galvano Fiamma. He also revised and enriched with notes the History of the Kingdom of Italy (De regno Italiæ), by Sigonius, and inserted it in the second volume of the complete edition of this scholar's works. The most constant object of Sassi's work was the ecclesiastical and literary history of Milan. However, he found the time to create a standard edition of the works of Charles Borromeo. He was preparing a major work on the history of the archbishops of Milan when he died on 21 April 1751.

== Publications ==
- Epistola apologetica pro identitate corporis S. Augustini reperti in Confessione S. Petri in cœlo aureo Papiæ, Milan, 1695.
- Dissertatio apologetica ad vindicand. Mediolano corporum SS. Gervasii et Protasii martyrum possessionem, Milan, 1708. The author disputed the views of Jean Mabillon, Daniel van Papenbroeck, Louis-Sébastien Le Nain de Tillemont, and Benedetto Bacchini, et al., who claimed that the relics of these martyrs were in Brisach. Papenbroeck acknowledged his mistake and retracted his statement in the supplement to the Acts of the Saints for the month of June.
- De studiis litterariis Mediolanensium antiquis et novis prodromus, Milan, 1729. This curious work contains the history of the schools, colleges, academies and other literary establishments of Milan from the earliest times. Sassi claims (Ch. 2) that the public library founded by Pliny the Younger could only have been founded in Milan, and that this city already possessed a collection of books formed by its first bishops in the second century; but Tiraboschi does not find the evidence he brings to support this opinion very conclusive.
- Epistola pro vindicanda formula in Ambrosiano canone ad missæ sacrum præscripta : Corpus tuum frangitur, Christe, Milan, 1731. (See: Journal des savants, 1732, p. 555). This letter was reproduced in 1737, by Calogerà, in vol. 14 of his Raccolta. Dissertatio historica ad vindicandam veritatem contra allegata ad concordiam in causa præcedentiæ; in qua antiqua Ambrosianæ ecclesiæ disciplina, et metropolitani Mediolanensis dignitas illustrantur, Milan, 1731.
- Historia litterario-typographica Mediolanensis, 1745. This work is the introduction to Argelati's history of the writers of Milan. The author precedes it with his essay on the literary establishments, ancient and modern, of the city of Milan, which has already been mentioned. After dealing with the introduction of the art of typography and early printers, he offers an essay on the scholars of Milan in the 15th century, with a list of their works that have been preserved among the manuscripts of the Ambrosian library. This is followed by a collection of dedicatory epistles or preliminary letters and finally a chronological catalogue of works printed in Milan from 1463 to 1500. Sassi leaves no stone unturned to prove that a printing press was established in Milan in 1463; he relies on the edition of the Historiæ Augustæ scriptores, cited by Saumaise for this date; however it is known that this collection was not printed until 1475, and no work with a definite date is known to have come off the presses of this city before 1469.
- Vindiciæ de adventu Mediolanum S. Barnabæ apostoli, contra nonnullos recentioris ætatis scriptores. Prodromus ad Commentaria ritus Ambrosiani, Milan, 1748.
- Archiepiscoporum mediolanensium series historico-chronologica ad criticæ leges et veterum monumentor. fidem illustrata, preceded by the life of the author, Milan, 1755.
