= Lectionary 284 =

Lectionary ℓ 284
- New Testament manuscript
- Text: Evangelistarium
- Date: 10th century
- Script: Greek
- Now at: Biblioteca Ambrosiana
- Size: 25.5 cm by 21 cm
- Type: Byzantine text-type

Lectionary 284, designated by siglum ℓ 284 (in the Gregory-Aland numbering) is a Greek manuscript of the New Testament, on parchment. Palaeographically it has been assigned to the 10th century. Scrivener labelled it as 163^{e}.

Only one leaf of the manuscript has survived.

== Description ==
The codex contains parts of the two lessons with the text of the Matthew (26:17-20) and Gospel of John (13:3-12) (Evangelistarium).

The text is written in Greek uncial letters, on 1 parchment leaf (25.5 cm by 21 cm), in two columns per page, 21 lines per page.

== History ==
Scrivener and Gregory dated the manuscript to the 10th century. It is presently assigned by the INTF to the 10th century.

The manuscript was added to the list of New Testament manuscripts by Scrivener (number 163^{e}) and Gregory (number 284^{e}). Gregory saw the manuscript in 1886.

The manuscript is not cited in the critical editions of the Greek New Testament (UBS3).

Currently the codex is housed at the Biblioteca Ambrosiana (Q. 79 sup., fol. 1) in Milan.

== See also ==
- List of New Testament lectionaries
- Biblical manuscript
- Textual criticism
- Lectionary 285

== Bibliography ==
- Gregory, Caspar René (1900). Textkritik des Neuen Testaments, Vol. 1. Leipzig: J.C. Hinrichs’sche Buchhandlung. p. 411.
