= Lectionary 291 =

Lectionary ℓ 291
- New Testament manuscript
- Text: Evangelistarium †
- Date: 11th century
- Script: Greek
- Now at: Laurentian Library
- Size: 23.7 cm by 20 cm
- Type: Byzantine text-type

Lectionary 291, designated by siglum ℓ 291 (in the Gregory-Aland numbering) is a Greek manuscript of the New Testament, on parchment. Palaeographically it has been assigned to the 11th century. Scrivener labelled it as 187^{e}.

== Description ==
The codex contains lessons from the Gospel of John, Matthew, and Luke (Evangelistarium), on 181 parchment leaves (23.7 cm by 20 cm). It contains music notes, the initial letters are rubricated. The manuscript was often used.

The text is written in Greek minuscule letters, in two columns per page, 21 lines per page. The manuscript contains weekday Gospel lessons for Church reading from Easter to Pentecost and Saturday/Sunday Gospel lessons for the other weeks.

== History ==
Scrivener and Gregory dated the manuscript to the 11th or 12th century. It is presently assigned by the INTF to the 11th century.

The manuscript once belonged to Niccolo de Niccolis.

The manuscript was added to the list of New Testament manuscripts by Scrivener (number 187^{e}) and Gregory (number 291^{e}). Gregory saw the manuscript in 1886.

The manuscript is not cited in the critical editions of the Greek New Testament (UBS3).

Currently the codex is housed at the Laurentian Library (S. Marco 706) in Florence.

== See also ==
- List of New Testament lectionaries
- Biblical manuscript
- Textual criticism
- Lectionary 290

== Bibliography ==
- Gregory, Caspar René (1900). Textkritik des Neuen Testaments, Vol. 1. Leipzig: J.C. Hinrichs’sche Buchhandlung. p. 412.
