= Lectionary 289 =

Lectionary ℓ 289
- New Testament manuscript
- Text: Evangelistarium †
- Date: 14th century
- Script: Greek
- Now at: Biblioteca Ambrosiana
- Size: 32.6 cm by 25.5 cm
- Type: Byzantine text-type

Lectionary 289, designated by siglum ℓ 289 (in the Gregory-Aland numbering) is a Greek manuscript of the New Testament, on parchment. Palaeographically it has been assigned to the 14th century. Frederick Henry Ambrose Scrivener labelled it as 168^{e}.

Some leaves of the manuscript were lost.

== Description ==
The codex contains lessons from the gospels of Matthew and Luke (Evangelistarium), on 156 parchment leaves (32.6 cm by 25.5 cm), with some lacunae. Lessons from the Gospel of John and major part of Menology were lost.

The text is written in Greek minuscule letters, in two columns per page, 27-28 lines per page. The manuscript contains weekday gospel lessons.

== History ==
Scrivener and Gregory dated the manuscript to the 14th century. It has been assigned by the Institute for New Testament Textual Research (INTF) to the 14th century.

The manuscript was added to the list of New Testament manuscripts by Scrivener (number 168^{e}) and Gregory (number 289^{e}). Gregory saw the manuscript in 1886.

The manuscript is not cited in the critical editions of the Greek New Testament (UBS3).

The codex is housed at the Biblioteca Ambrosiana (C. 160 inf.) in Milan.

== See also ==
- List of New Testament lectionaries
- Biblical manuscript
- Textual criticism
- Lectionary 288

== Bibliography ==
- Gregory, Caspar René (1900). Textkritik des Neuen Testaments, Vol. 1. Leipzig: J.C. Hinrichs’sche Buchhandlung. p. 412.
