= Lectionary 286 =

Lectionary ℓ 286
- New Testament manuscript
- Text: Evangelistarium
- Date: 9th century
- Script: Greek
- Now at: Biblioteca Ambrosiana
- Size: 25.5 cm by 17.2 cm
- Type: Byzantine text-type

Lectionary 286, designated by siglum ℓ 286 (in the Gregory-Aland numbering) is a Greek manuscript of the New Testament, on parchment. Palaeographically it has been assigned to the 9th century. Scrivener labelled it as 480^{e}.

Only five leaves of the manuscript have survived.

== Description ==
The codex contains lessons from the Gospel of John, Matthew, and Luke (Evangelistarium), with some lacunae.

The text is written in Greek uncial letters, on 5 parchment leaves (25.5 cm by 17.2 cm), in one column per page, 23-25 lines per page. The manuscript contains weekday Gospel lessons.

It is a palimpsest, the upper text was written in 1150, it contains the writings of Theodor Studites and Anastasius Sinaita.

== History ==
Scrivener and Gregory dated the manuscript to the 9th century. It has been assigned by the Institute for New Testament Textual Research to the 9th century.

The manuscript was added to the list of New Testament manuscripts by Scrivener (number 480^{e}) and Gregory (number 286^{e}). Gregory saw the manuscript in 1886.

The manuscript is not cited in the critical editions of the Greek New Testament (UBS3).

The codex is housed at the Biblioteca Ambrosiana (E. 101 sup.) in Milan.

== See also ==
- List of New Testament lectionaries
- Biblical manuscript
- Textual criticism
- Lectionary 285

== Bibliography ==
- Gregory, Caspar René (1900). Textkritik des Neuen Testaments, Vol. 1. Leipzig: J.C. Hinrichs’sche Buchhandlung. p. 411.
