= Lectionary 288 =

Lectionary ℓ 288
- New Testament manuscript
- Text: Evangelistarium †
- Date: 13th century
- Script: Greek
- Now at: Biblioteca Ambrosiana
- Size: 29 cm by 23.5 cm
- Type: Byzantine text-type

Lectionary 288, designated by siglum ℓ 288 (in the Gregory-Aland numbering) is a Greek manuscript of the New Testament, on parchment. Palaeographically it has been assigned to the 13th century. Scrivener labelled it as 167^{e}.

Only several leaves of the manuscript were lost.

== Description ==
The codex contains lessons from the Gospel of John, Matthew, and Luke (Evangelistarium), on 124 parchment leaves (29 cm by 23.5 cm), with some lacunae at the beginning and end. The leaves 1–9, 104-123 were supplied on paper in the 16th century.

The text is written in Greek minuscule letters, in two columns per page, 24 lines per page. The manuscript contains weekday Gospel lessons for Church reading from Easter to Pentecost and Saturday/Sunday Gospel lessons for the other weeks.

== History ==
Scrivener and Gregory dated the manuscript to the 13th century. It is presently assigned by the INTF to the 13th century.

The manuscript was added to the list of New Testament manuscripts by Scrivener (number 167^{e}) and Gregory (number 288^{e}). Gregory saw the manuscript in 1886.

The manuscript is not cited in the critical editions of the Greek New Testament (UBS3).

Currently the codex is housed at the Biblioteca Ambrosiana (A. 150 sup.) in Milan.

== See also ==
- List of New Testament lectionaries
- Biblical manuscript
- Textual criticism
- Lectionary 287

== Bibliography ==
- Gregory, Caspar René (1900). Textkritik des Neuen Testaments, Vol. 1. Leipzig: J.C. Hinrichs’sche Buchhandlung. p. 412.
