= Lectionary 103 =

Greek manuscript of the New Testament of the Bible

Lectionary ℓ 103
- New Testament manuscript
- Text: Evangelistarion
- Date: 13th-century
- Script: Greek
- Now at: Biblioteca Ambrosiana
- Size: 29.5 cm by 20.5 cm

Lectionary 103, designated by siglum ℓ 103 (in the Gregory-Aland numbering) is a Greek manuscript of the New Testament, on parchment leaves. Palaeographically it has been assigned to the 13th-century.

== Description ==
The codex contains lessons from the Gospels of John, Matthew, Luke lectionary (Evangelistarium). It is written in Greek minuscule letters, on 138 parchment leaves (29.5 cm by 20.5 cm), in 2 columns per page, 31-32 lines per page. It contains a lot of pictures.

== History ==
The manuscript was written in the West. It was bought in 1606 Corneliani in Salentinis (as ℓ 163). It was added to the list of New Testament manuscripts by Scholz, who examined some parts of it.

The manuscript is not cited in the critical editions of the Greek New Testament (UBS3).

Currently the codex is located in the Biblioteca Ambrosiana (D. 67 sup.) in Milan.

== See also ==
- List of New Testament lectionaries
- Biblical manuscript
- Textual criticism

== Bibliography ==
- Gregory, Caspar René (1900). Textkritik des Neuen Testaments. Vol. 1. Leipzig: J.C. Hinrichs. p. 396.
