= Minuscule 163 =

- New Testament manuscript
- Name: Codex Barberinianus 12
- Text: Gospels
- Date: 1193?
- Script: Greek
- Now at: Vatican Library
- Size: 29 cm by 19.7 cm
- Category: none
- Note: marginalia

Minuscule 163 (in the Gregory-Aland numbering), ε 114 (Soden), is a Greek minuscule manuscript of the New Testament, on parchment. It is dated by its colophon to the year 1193 (?). It has complex contents and full marginalia.

== Description ==
The codex contains a complete text of the four Gospels on 173 thick parchment leaves (size 28 cm by 19.7 cm). The text is written in two columns per page, in 33 lines per page, ink is black.

The text is divided according to the κεφαλαια (chapters), whose numbers are given at the margin, (no τιτλοι). There is also a division according to the Ammonian Sections (in Mark 237 – the last section in 16:15), with references to the Eusebian Canons (written below Ammonian Section numbers).

It contains the Eusebian tables, tables of the κεφαλαια (tables of contents) are placed before each Gospel, lectionary markings at the margin for liturgical use, incipits, synaxaria, Menologion, subscriptions at the end of each Gospel, with numbers of ρηματα, and numbers of στιχοι (to the first three Gospels), and pictures.

== Text ==
Kurt Aland the Greek text of the codex did not place in any Category.

According to the Claremont Profile Method it creates textual cluster 163 and textual pair with 345.

== History ==
It was written in Syria, in 1193 (?).

It was examined by Birch (about 1782) and Scholz (1794-1852). Scholz ascribed it as "solumnodo pericopas in ecclesia legi sotitas". C. R. Gregory saw it in 1886.

It is currently housed at the Vatican Library (Barberini, gr. 520), at Rome.

== See also ==
- List of New Testament minuscules
- Biblical manuscript
- Textual criticism
