= Lectionary 287 =

Lectionary ℓ 287
- New Testament manuscript
- Text: Evangelistarium
- Date: 13th century
- Script: Greek
- Now at: Biblioteca Ambrosiana
- Size: 29 cm by 21 cm
- Type: Byzantine text-type

Lectionary 287, designated by siglum ℓ 287 (in the Gregory-Aland numbering) is a Greek manuscript of the New Testament, on parchment. Palaeographically it has been assigned to the 13th century. Frederick Henry Ambrose Scrivener labelled it as 166^{e}.

== Description ==
The codex contains lessons from the Gospel of John, Matthew, and Luke (Evangelistarium), on 201 parchment leaves (29 cm by 21 cm), with some lacunae.

The text is written in Greek minuscule letters, in two columns per page, 29 lines per page. The manuscript contains weekday Gospel lessons.

It contains the text of the Pericope Adulterae (John 8:3-11).

== History ==
Scrivener and Gregory dated the manuscript to the 13th century. It has been assigned by the Institute for New Testament Textual Research to the 13th century.

The manuscript was added to the list of New Testament manuscripts by Scrivener (number 166^{e}) and Gregory (number 287^{e}). Gregory saw the manuscript in 1886.

The manuscript is not cited in the critical editions of the Greek New Testament (UBS3).

The codex is housed at the Biblioteca Ambrosiana (D. 108 sup., fol. 3–203) in Milan. The leaves 1–2,204 of the same codex are classified as lectionary 2352 (Gregory-Aland).

== See also ==
- List of New Testament lectionaries
- Biblical manuscript
- Textual criticism
- Lectionary 286

== Bibliography ==
- Gregory, Caspar René (1900). Textkritik des Neuen Testaments, Vol. 1. Leipzig: J.C. Hinrichs’sche Buchhandlung. p. 411.
