= Minuscule 347 =

- New Testament manuscript
- Text: Gospels
- Date: 12th century
- Script: Greek
- Now at: Biblioteca Ambrosiana
- Cite: Scholz, Biblisch-kritische Reise (1823)
- Size: 23.1 cm by 16.5 cm
- Type: Byzantine text-type
- Category: V
- Note: correctly written

Minuscule 347 (in the Gregory-Aland numbering), ε 226 (Soden), is a Greek minuscule manuscript of the New Testament, on parchment. Paleographically it has been assigned to the 12th century. It has full marginalia.

== Description ==
The codex contains a complete text of the four Gospels on 245 parchment leaves (23.1 cm by 16.5 cm) with only one lacuna (Matthew 1:1-10). The text is written in one column per page, in 25 lines per page.

The text is divided according to the κεφαλαια (chapters), whose numbers are given at the margin, and their τιτλοι (titles) at the top of the pages. There is also a division according to the Ammonian Sections (in Mark 233 Sections - 16:8), with references to the Eusebian Canons (written below Ammonian Section numbers).

It contains Prolegomena, Epistula ad Carpianum, tables of the κεφαλαια (tables of contents) before each Gospel, and lectionary markings at the end of each Gospel (for liturgical use).

== Text ==
The Greek text of the codex is a representative of the Byzantine text-type. Hermann von Soden classified it to the textual family K^{x}. Aland placed it in Category V.

According to the Claremont Profile Method it represents textual family K^{x} in Luke 1 and Luke 20. In Luke 10 no profile was made.

The text of the Pericope Adulterae (John 7:53-8:11) is placed after John 21:25.

== History ==
The manuscript was written by Constantin Chrysographus. It was examined by Scholz and Burgon. It was added to the list of New Testament manuscripts by Scholz (1794-1852). C. R. Gregory saw it in 1886.

The manuscript is currently housed at the Biblioteca Ambrosiana (R. 35 sup.) in Milan.

== See also ==
- List of New Testament minuscules
- Biblical manuscript
- Textual criticism
