= Richard Lassels =

The Voyage of Italy

Richard Lassels (also Lascelles) (c. 1603–1668) was a Roman Catholic priest and a travel writer. Lassels was a tutor to several of the English nobility, and traveled through Italy five times. He is best known for his work, The Voyage of Italy, or a Compleat Journey through Italy, printed in Paris and published in London in 1670. In his book, he asserts that any truly serious student of architecture, antiquity, and the arts must travel through France and Italy, and suggested that all "young lords" make what he referred to as the Grand Tour in order to understand the political, social, and economic realities of the world.

== Early life and education ==
Lassels was the younger son of a Catholic gentleman, William Lascelles of Brackenborough in Yorkshire, and grandson of Sir Thomas Lascelles, a member of the council of the north; his mother was Elizabeth Tunstall, youngest daughter of Sir Francis Tunstall of Thurland Castle, Lancashire, and Anne Bold (from whom Richard and his brothers derived their religious alias ‘Bolds’). About 1623, Lassels followed two of his brothers abroad to be educated in the Southern Netherlands at Douai College; Thomas and John Lassels had both been there since 1618 and were ordained as priests in 1624 and 1625 respectively.

In May 1626 Richard was sent with a group of students to Paris, probably because of the plague. According to Anthony Wood he was 'an hospes for some time' at Oxford, 'as those of his persuasion have told me, but whether before or after he left England they could not tell'. Back at Douai he was teaching grammar in 1629 (the year when a third brother, Ralph Lassels, also arrived at the college) and syntax a year later. Richard was ordained priest there on 6 March 1632. Almost certainly he was the author (under his alias of Richard Bolds) of The Conviction of Noveltie, and Defense of Antiquitie (1633), a slim duodecimo by 'R.B. Roman Catholicke, and one of the English Clergie, and Mission'. It is likely that he returned to England briefly, on the mission to reconvert his compatriots, after his ordination.

== Career and travels ==
In 1633 Lassels returned to Paris, however, where he was employed first by the Catholic bishop in exile, Richard Smith, and then by Smith's patron, Cardinal Richelieu, as Latin secretary. In 1637 he saw through the press at Paris his Latin translation, Epistola historica de mutuis officiis (dedicated to Charles I), of Smith's work, then visited Rome, probably on clergy business, and stayed there with Peter Fitton, a fellow priest and scholar. Something of a connoisseur, and a friend of Bellori, Fitton may have introduced Lassels to Italian art and fellow scholars in this field. Lassels became familiar with the works of Vasari, Carlo Rifoldi, and Bellori, and may indeed have met the last as well as artists such as François du Quesnoy and Gianlorenzo Bernini. He also refers in his writings to the great collector the earl of Arundel, another acquaintance of Fitton's. During this time he translated the twelfth volume of Cardinal Caesar Baronius's Annales, which was published in Paris in 1639 as The Life or the Ecclesiasticall Historie of S. Thomas Archbishope of Canterbury. The civil war confirmed Lassels's residence abroad, and by 1644 he was apparently chaplain to the self-exiled Lady Anne Brudenell, in Paris. This was where he published The Way how to Heare Masse with Profit and Devotion' (1644, with a dedication to Lady Anne) though our knowledge of this edition depends upon a later manuscript transcript and published versions.

Having already acted as travelling tutor, in the jubilee year of 1650 Lassels was asked to accompany a daughter of the earl of Shrewsbury, the Lady Catherine Whetenhall, to Rome. At her death in childbirth in Padua her husband asked Lassels to write an account of their journey together. This was the first in what became a series of continuously revised manuscript accounts of Italy based on his experience of several tours with young royalist and Catholic exiles: 'The Description of Italy' of 1654, written for David Murray, Lord Balvaird, whom he was unable to accompany in person; 'The Voyage of Italy' of about 1663 (now at North Yorkshire County Record Office); and 'The Voyage of Italy' of 1664 (now at Yale University, Beinecke Library).

During the late 1650s and 1660s Lassels was cited in correspondence now in the Westminster Cathedral Archives as a candidate to be Richard Smith's successor as bishop of Chalcedon. But Lassels died in September 1668 in Montpellier in his capacity as travelling tutor, during what would have been his sixth voyage to Italy, accompanying Richard, Lord Lumley, and Ralph Sheldon. He was buried in the church of the Discalced Carmelites, Montpellier, and left 100 florins to Douai College. His fellow priest Simon Wilson obtained the latest version of his Voyage manuscript, edited it (ultimately omitting those passages likely to offend Protestant taste), printed it first in Paris in 1670 with Vincent du Moutier. A less censored version was published in Paris in 1671 by Louis Billaine.

Lassels's Voyage of Italy became the most influential English guidebook of the period, conditioning the first impressions of many tourists to that country. It is particularly notable for summarizing Vasari's Vite de' piu eccellenti pittori, scultori e architetti, as well as Carlo Ridolfi's Le Maraviglie dell'Arte and other Italian sources where relevant. It thus provided the basis for most subsequent guidebooks as well as manuscript accounts, including even the 'Diary' of John Evelyn, though the latter purports to date from the 1640s. The unprecedented attention it paid to art and architecture encouraged the phenomenon of the eighteenth-century style ‘grand tour’ (a term coined by Lassels) according to which art and antiquities eventually prevailed over all other subjects, religious or secular. It was translated and published in French and German and was still being reprinted in the early eighteenth century.

Aside from Lassels's published works, notes and two or three completed pietistic manuscripts ('Collections … out of Baronius' and the two-volume 'Apologie for the Roman Catholicks') in his fine, distinctive hand survive at Oscott College, near Birmingham.
