= Pierre Dupuy (scholar) =

French scholar (1582–1651)

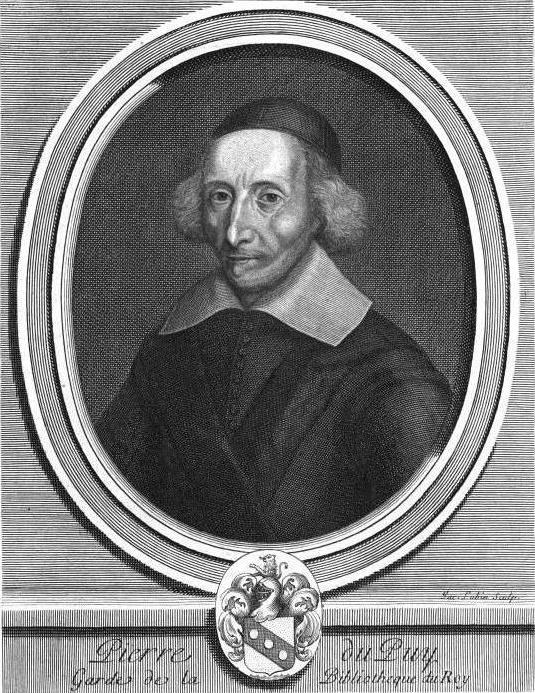
Pierre Dupuy.

Pierre Dupuy (French pronunciation: [pjɛʁ dypɥi]; 27 November 1582 – 14 December 1651), otherwise known as Puteanus, was a French scholar, the son of the humanist and bibliophile Claude Dupuy.

== Biography ==
He was born on 27 November 1582, in Agen, Agenais, France.

In 1615, he was commissioned by Mathieu Molé, first president of the parlement of Paris, to draw up an inventory of the documents which constituted what at that time was known as the Trésor des chartes. This work occupied eleven years. His manuscript inventory is preserved in the original and in copy in the Bibliothèque Nationale, and transcriptions are in the national archives in Paris, at the record office in London, and elsewhere.

Dupuy's classification is still regarded with respect, but the inventory has been partially replaced by the publication of the Layettes du trésor (four volumes, coming down to 1270; 1863–1902). Dupuy also published, with his brother Jacques, and their friend Nicolas Rigault, the History of Aug. de Thou (1620, 1626). The two brothers then bought from Rigault the post of keeper of the king's library, and drew up a catalogue of the library (Nos. 9352-9354 and 10366-10367 of the Latin collection in the Bibliothèque Nationale).

In the course of this work, Dupuy became acquainted with and copied an enormous mass of unpublished documents, which furnished him with the material for some excellent works:

- Traité des droits et des libertés de l'Église gallicane, avec les preuves (1639)
- Histoire de l'ordre militaire des Templiers (1654)
- Histoire générale du schisme qui a été dans l'Église depuis 1378 jusqu'à 1428 (1654)
- Histoire du différend entre le pape Boniface VIII et le roi Philippe le Bel (1655)

These works, especially the last, are important contributions to the history of the relations of church and state in the Middle Ages. They were written from the Gallican standpoint, i.e. in favour of the rights of the crown in temporal and political matters, and this explains the delay in their publication until after Dupuy's death.

He wrote also Traité des régences et des majorités des rois de France (1655) and Recueil des droits du roi (1658). Dupuy's papers, preserved in the Bibliothèque Nationale, were inventoried by Léon Dorez (Catalogue de la collection Dupuy, 1899). See also Léopold Delisle's Le Cabinet des manuscrits de la Bibliothèque impériale.

Dupuy died in Paris.
