= Lectionary 285 =

Lectionary ℓ 285
- New Testament manuscript
- Text: Evangelistarium
- Date: 12th century
- Script: Greek
- Now at: Biblioteca Ambrosiana
- Size: 26.9 cm by 21.9 cm
- Type: Byzantine text-type

Lectionary 285, designated by siglum ℓ 285 (in the Gregory-Aland numbering) is a Greek manuscript of the New Testament, on parchment. Palaeographically it has been assigned to the 12th century. Frederick Henry Ambrose Scrivener labelled it as 164^{e} and 165^{e}.

Only 37 leaves of the manuscript has survived.

== Description ==
The codex contains lessons from the Gospel of John, Matthew, and Luke (Evangelistarium), with some lacunae.

The text is written in Greek minuscule letters, on 37 parchment leaves (26.9 cm by 21.9 cm), in two columns per page, 22) lines per page. The manuscript contains weekday Gospel lessons.

== History ==
Scrivener and Gregory dated the manuscript to the 12th century. It has been assigned by the Institute for New Testament Textual Research to the 12th century.

The manuscript was added to the list of New Testament manuscripts by Scrivener (number 164^{e} and 165^{e}) and Gregory (number 285^{e}). Gregory saw the manuscript in 1886. According to Scrivener the first leaf belonged to the other manuscript. It was not confirmed by Gregory, Aland and other textual critics.

The manuscript is not cited in the critical editions of the Greek New Testament (UBS3).

The codex is housed at the Biblioteca Ambrosiana (I. 94 suss., fol. 1-37) in Milan.

== See also ==
- List of New Testament lectionaries
- Biblical manuscript
- Textual criticism
- Lectionary 284

== Bibliography ==
- Gregory, Caspar René (1900). Textkritik des Neuen Testaments, Vol. 1. Leipzig: J.C. Hinrichs’sche Buchhandlung. p. 411.
