= Gian Vincenzo Pinelli =

Italian humanist and botanist

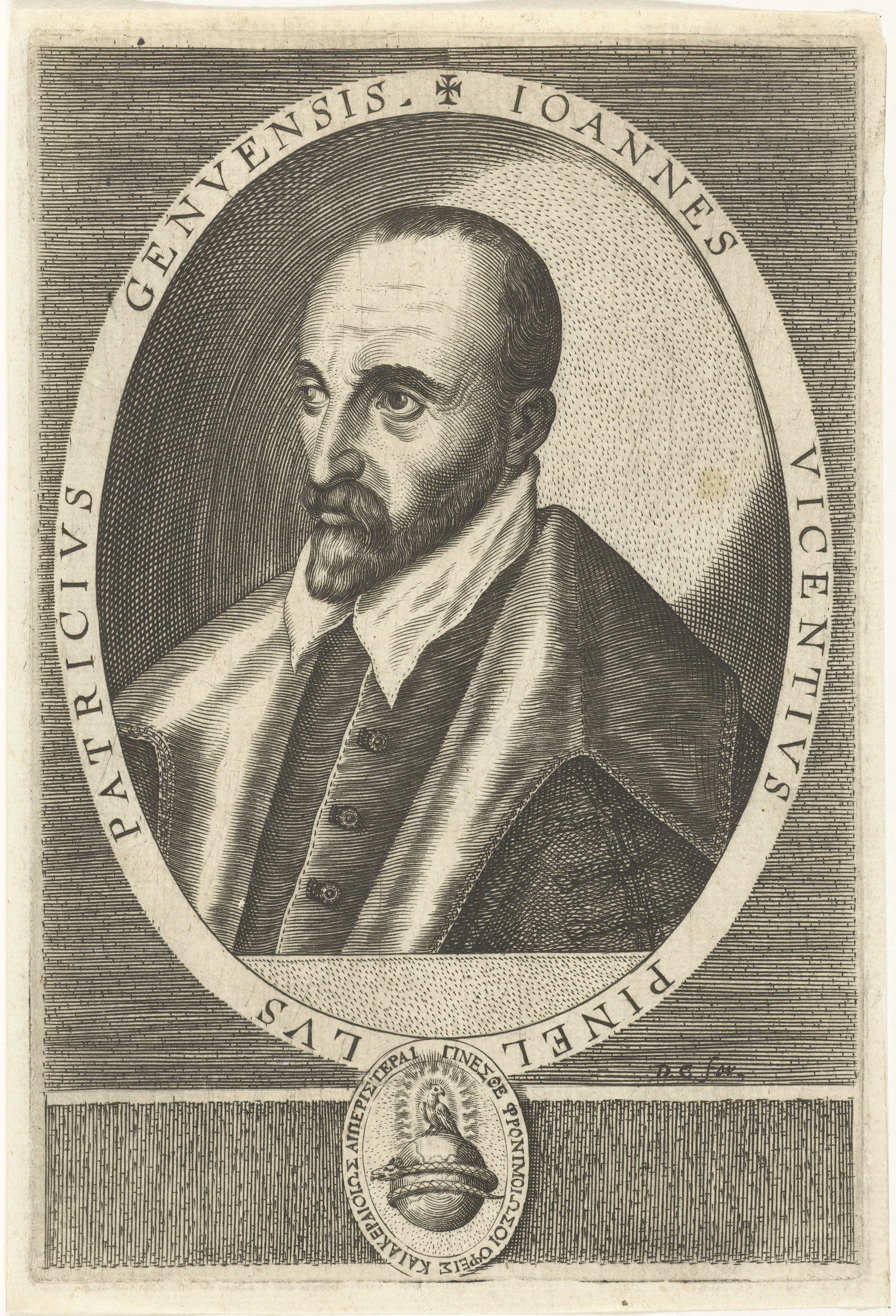
- Portrait of Gian Vincenzo Pinelli by Dominicus Custos
- Born: 1535; Naples, Kingdom of Naples
- Died: 31 August 1601 (aged 65–66); Padua, Republic of Venice
- Education: University of Padua
- Occupation: Renaissance humanist

Gian Vincenzo Pinelli (1535 – 31 August 1601) was an Italian humanist, born in Naples and known as a savant and a mentor of Galileo. His literary correspondence put him at the center of a European network of virtuosi. He was also a noted botanist, bibliophile and collector of scientific instruments. The Aroid genus Pinellia is named after him.

== Collector ==
His enormous library was probably the greatest in 16th-century Italy, consisting of around 8,500 printed works at the moment of his death, plus hundreds of manuscripts. When he died, in 1601, Nicolas Fabri de Peiresc was in his house and spent some of the following months studying his library and taking notes from its catalogues. Pinelli's secretary, Paolo Gualdo, wrote and published (1607) a biography of Pinelli which is also the portrait of the perfect scholar and book-collector.

His collection of manuscripts, when it was purchased from his estate in 1608 for the Biblioteca Ambrosiana, filled 70 cases. Pinelli stood out among the early bibliophile collectors who established scientific bases for the methodically assembled private library, aided by the comparatively new figure—in the European world— of the bookseller.

His love of books and manuscripts, and his interest in optics, labored under a disability: a childhood mishap had destroyed the vision of one eye, forcing him to protect his weak vision with green-tinted lenses. Cautious and withdrawn by nature, detesting travel whether by road or canal boat, wracked by the gallstones that eventually killed him, he found solace in the library he amassed over a period of fifty years (Nuovo 2003).

Leonardo's treatise on painting, Trattato della Pittura, was transcribed in the Codex Pinellianus ca. 1585, perhaps expressly for Pinelli who made annotations in it. Pinelli's codex was the source for the Barberini codex from which it was eventually printed, ostensibly edited by Raphael du Fresne, in 1651. Pinelli's interest in the new science of optics was formative for Galileo Galilei, for whom Pinelli opened his library in the 1590s, where Galileo read the unpublished manuscripts, consisting of lecture notes and drafts of essays on optics, of Ettore Ausonio, a Venetian mathematician and physician, and of Giuseppe Moleto, professor of mathematics at Padua (Dupre).

Beside his Greek and Latin libraries of manuscripts his collection included the original Arabic manuscript from which was translated and printed the Descrittione dell'Africa of Leo Africanus.

== Other interests ==
He was among Europe's early botanists, and also collected mathematical instruments. He had taken musical instruction from the great madrigalist Philippe de Monte, with whom he continued a correspondence. He kept his amanuensis Camillus Venetus (Zanettus) busy.

In the field of botany, he collected herbs in his garden and corresponded with the father of Italian botany, Luca Ghini, who pioneered the techniques of drying and pressing plant material for a herbarium and whose papers he transcribed after Ghini's death, while the botanists who would be considered Ghini's heirs, like Andrea Mattioli and Ulisse Aldrovandi, clamored for them.

Pinelli's voluminous correspondence with the French humanist and book collector Claude Dupuy was published in 2001.
