= Biblioteca Ambrosiana =

Historic library in Milan, Italy

Pinacoteca Ambrosiana
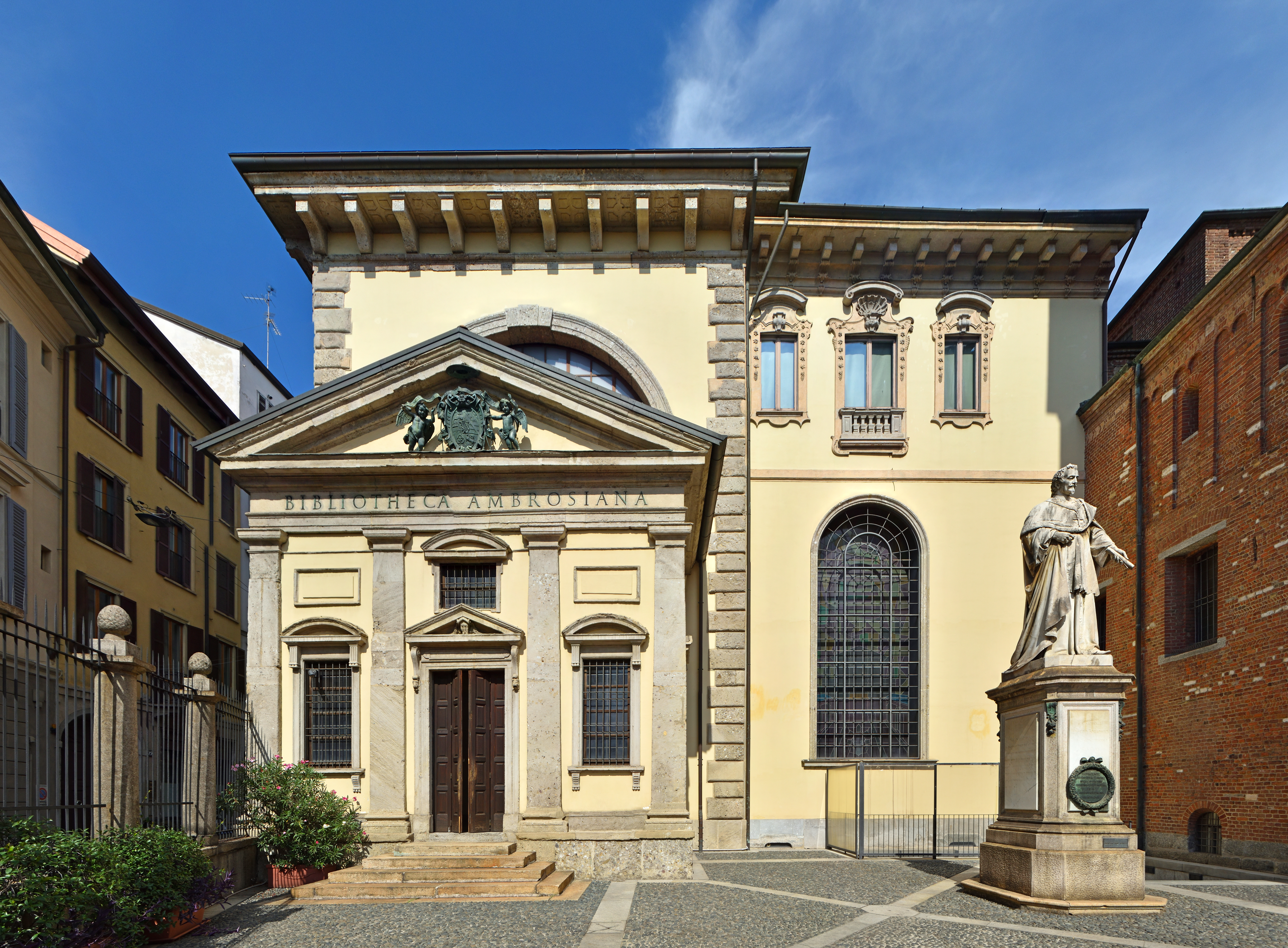
- Entrance to the Biblioteca Ambrosiana
- Established: 1609
- Location: Piazza Pio XI 2, 20123, Milan, Italy
- Coordinates: 45.4631°N 9.1854°E
- Director: Alberto Rocca
- Website: www.ambrosiana.it

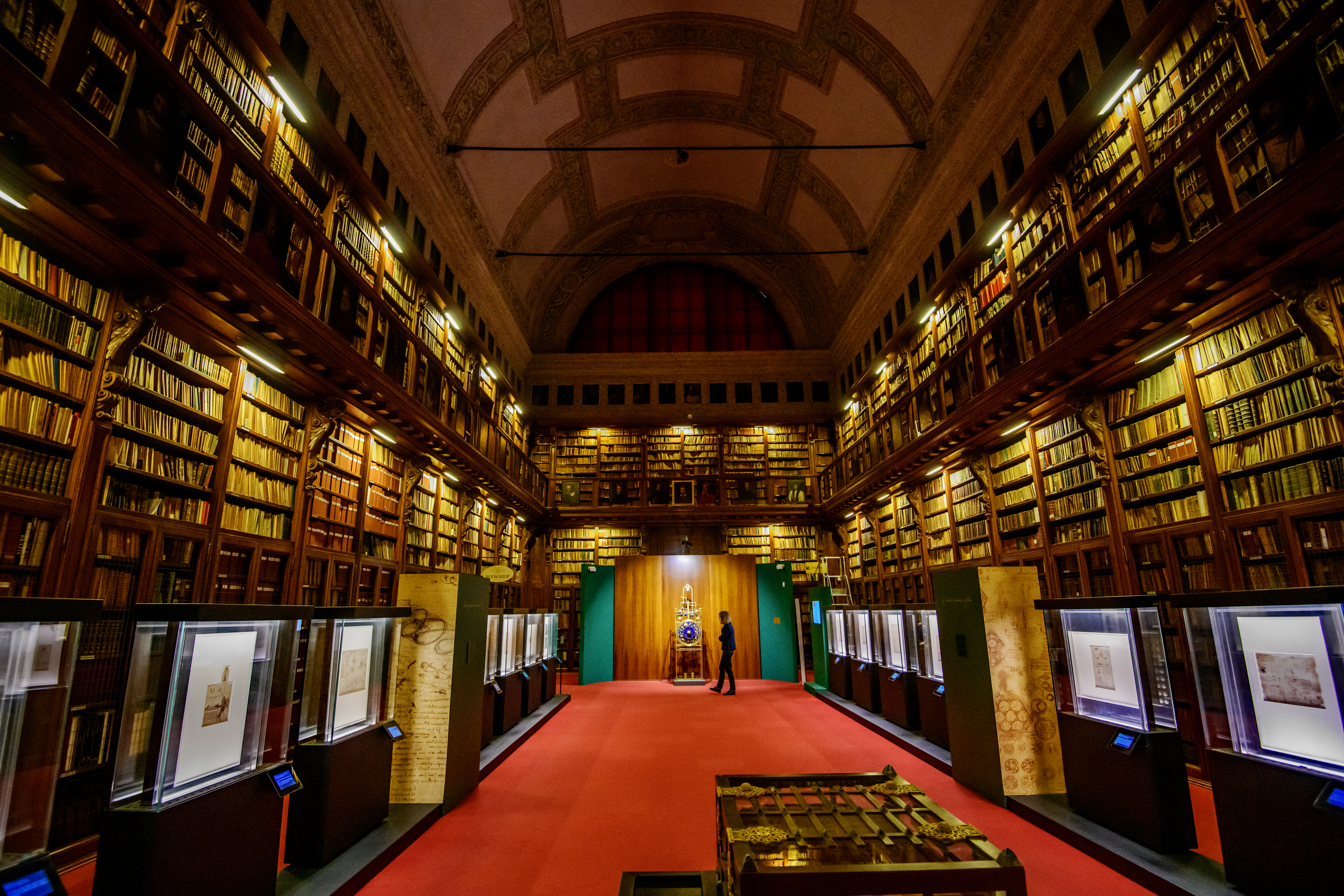
Biblioteca Ambrosiana

The Biblioteca Ambrosiana is a historic library in Milan, Italy, also housing the Pinacoteca Ambrosiana, the Ambrosian art gallery. Named after Ambrose, the patron saint of Milan, it was founded in 1609 by Cardinal Federico Borromeo, whose agents scoured Western Europe and even Greece and Syria for books and manuscripts. Some major acquisitions of complete libraries were the manuscripts of the Benedictine monastery of Bobbio (1606) and the library of the Paduan Vincenzo Pinelli, whose more than 800 manuscripts filled 70 cases when they were sent to Milan and included the famous Iliad, the Ilias Picta.

== Background ==
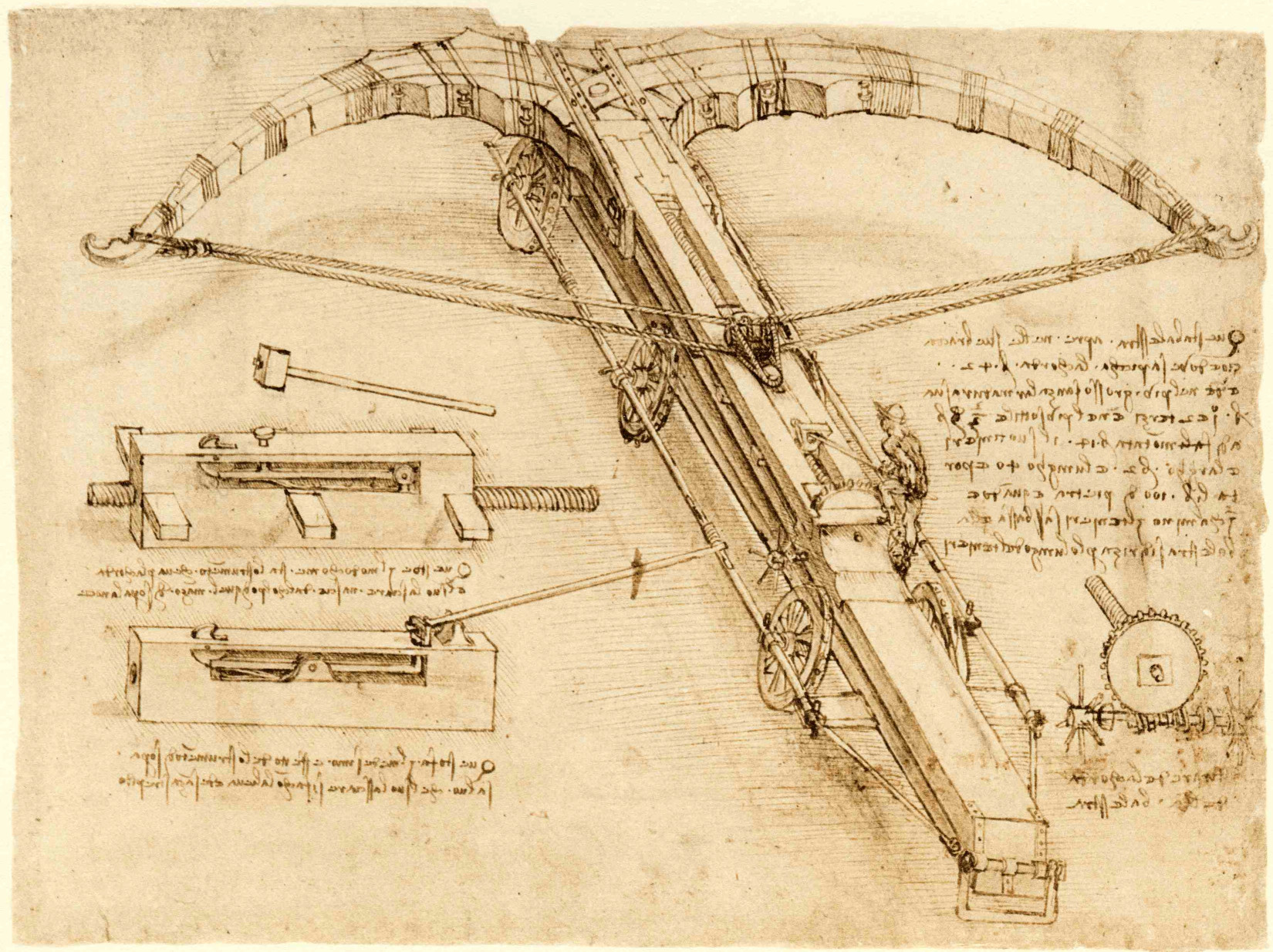
Leonardo da Vinci Crossbow sketch, Codex Atlanticus

During his sojourns in Rome, 1585–95 and 1597–1601, Cardinal Borromeo envisioned developing a library in Milan as one open to scholars and that would serve as a bulwark of Catholic scholarship in the service of the Counter-Reformation against the treatises issuing from Protestant presses.

The library's contents were assembled in the six preceding years by a team of purchasing agents, members of the Cardinal's establishment or ecclesiastical hommes de confiance. These emissaries, who travelled over much of the Mediterranean, were kept under strict financial control from Milan and worked to a master plan devised by the Cardinal. In this scheme, Greek manuscripts, of which there were more than a thousand, held the position of honour that had become normal since the Renaissance, but Oriental languages were given greater prominence than in earlier public collections. There was only one large block purchase; attempts to buy the library of Cardinal Ascanio Colonna in Rome and those of Giacomo Barocci and Pietro Bembo in Venice were unsuccessful, though Lucrezia Borgia's love letters presumably came from the last. Otherwise, the books were acquired singly or in small groups.

An important source of supply was the churches and monasteries of northern Italy to whom the Cardinal-Archbishop was clearly well placed to appeal. The most valuable codex obtained in this way was perhaps the sixth-century papyrus Josephus from Sant'Ambrogio in Milan, and the greatest coup, the acquisition of part of Bobbio's ancient library in exchange for 'more useful' modern books. Bobbio had been founded in the early seventh century by a party of Irish monks under St Columban, and still owned the only substantial group of Italian pre-Caroline manuscripts outside Verona Cathedral.

Cardinal Federigo chose a suitable envoy, Gian Giacomo Valeri, of an old Milanese family, Canon of Santa Maria della Scala and an antiquarian collector on his own account. Negotiations were opened in 1605 and had immediate success. The following year, about seventy-four manuscripts reached the Ambrosiana, among them at least two written in Ireland (one at Bangor in County Down), and several palimpsests, one of the submerged texts being of three lost orations of Cicero.

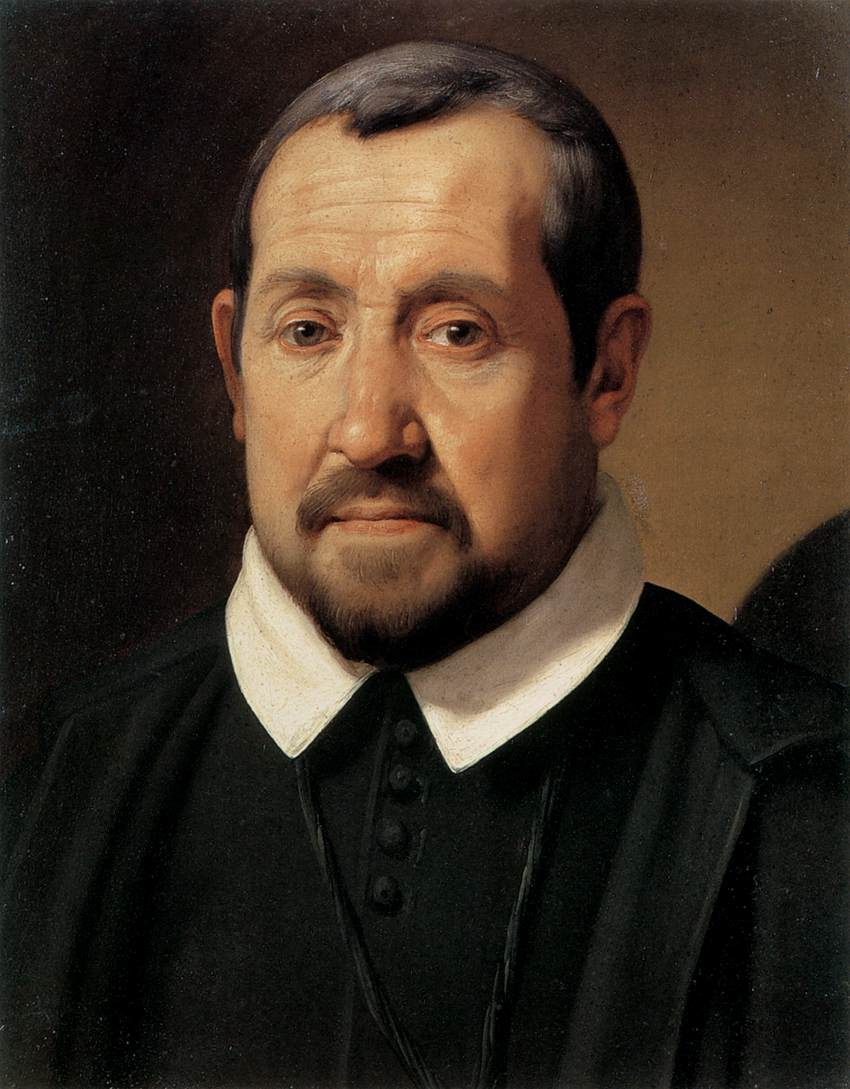
Portrait of Antonio Olgiati by Daniele Crespi

Antonio Olgiati, the Cardinal's librarian and first Prefect of the Ambrosiana, was sent on a buying mission to south Germany, the southern Netherlands and France. Francesco Bernardino Ferrari, later Olgiati's successor as Prefect, made a similar journey to Spain. An Ambrosian Doctor, Antonio Salmazia, spent a year from 1607 to 1608 in Corfu hunting for Greek manuscripts. Harassed by delays in the transfer of funds and by the Corfiotes' hostility, tantalised by travellers' tales from the mainland of 'a very numerous and good library which once belonged to an Emperor in Constantinople' or of a Gospels with the words of Christ written in gold and those of 'the Jewish hordes' in black, he nevertheless succeeded in buying 113 manuscripts by weight (one Corfiote pound weight of manuscript cost five Milanese lire). A group of Greek manuscripts was purchased in Venice from the titular archbishop of Philadelphia, and others were received in a consignment from Chios, and discovered in the monasteries of Abruzzo. Hebrew manuscripts and some rare printed books were obtained from the Jewish communities of Bologna and other Italian towns by Domenico Gerosolimitano, a converted rabbi in the Cardinal's service.

Works in Oriental languages have been a feature of the Ambrosiana's holdings since its foundation, but little is known of how or where the 340 Arabic, Persian and Turkish manuscripts of the vecchio fondo were acquired. A Lebanese Christian was dispatched to the Levant from 1610 to 1617, but with what result, other than a gift of 'Chaldean books' from the Maronite patriarch, is not recorded. Probably the advice of Diego de Urrea Conca, a Spanish Arabist living in Naples, was followed; he recommended asking the Grand Duke of Tuscany and the Grand Master of the Knights Hospitaller to instruct their ships to buy Arabic manuscripts in quantity when they visited Cairo and ‘those parts’. Even so, the founder's appetite for the exotic was not satisfied. He owned works in Glagolitic (the medieval alphabet of Croatia) and a Japanese Contemptus mundi printed in Amakusa in 1596, and begged Cardinal Ottavio Bandini’s secretary to find him hieroglyphic books.

In 1601, Cardinal Federigo's correspondent and friend, Gian Vincenzo Pinelli, died in Padua. Two hundred volumes of transcripts of state papers were impounded by the Republic of Venice, and more books were lost when Barbary pirates attacked the galleys carrying the consignment down the Adriatic to the collector's Neapolitan heirs. The remainder of the library was offered at auction in Naples in 1608 (the earliest recorded book auction sale in Italy) and bought for the Ambrosiana for 3,050 scudi. There were further delays - the printed books would not have paid the cost of shipping and had to be left behind, for safe transport, it was necessary to wait for the Genoese fleet returning from escorting a new archbishop to Sicily. Eventually, in the middle of 160,9 five hundred and fifty manuscripts, nearly half of which were Greek, arrived in Milan.

== Building ==
To house the cardinal's 15,000 manuscripts and twice that many printed books, construction began in 1603 under the designs and direction of Lelio Buzzi and Francesco Maria Richini.

The library was shelved behind brass grilles around the walls of a single room with a high, coved ceiling, designed by Richini and Buzzi and completed by 1609. Two friezes of authors' and artists' portraits, inspired by Paolo Giovio's famous series at Como, ran along the gallery and above the bookcases. The light entered by two enormous semicircular windows at each end of the room. Rooms to hold collections of pictures and casts of antique statues, to which was later added accommodation for schools of painting and sculpture, occupied the remainder of a long, narrow building adjoining the churches of San Sepolcro and Santa Maria della Rosa in the centre of Milan.

When its first reading room, the Sala Fredericiana, opened to the public on 8 December 1609, it became one of the earliest public libraries. One innovation was that its books were housed in cases ranged along the walls, rather than chained to reading tables, the latter a medieval practice seen still today in the Laurentian Library of Florence. A printing press was attached to the library, and a school for instruction in the classical languages.

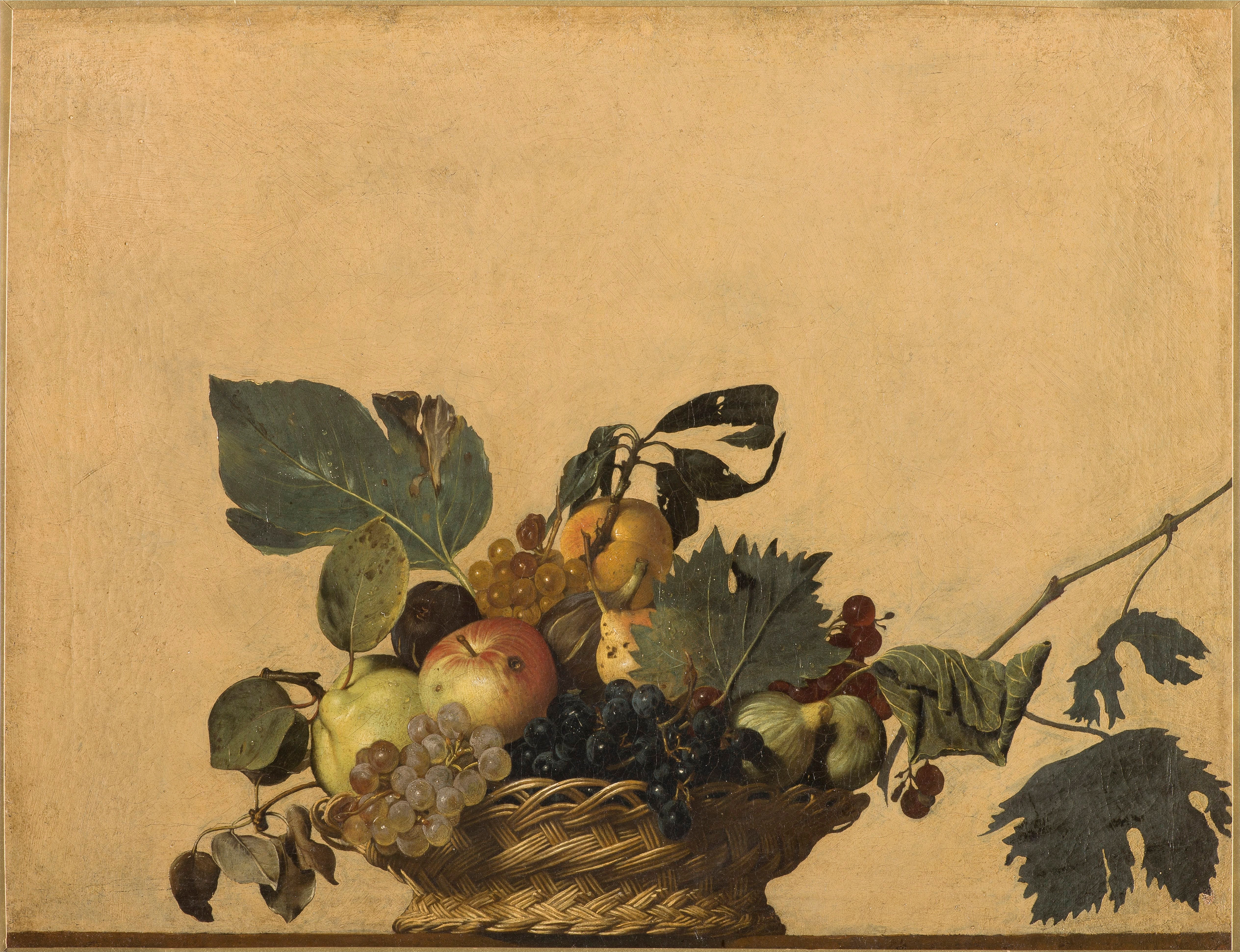
Caravaggio's Basket of Fruit

== Pinacoteca Ambrosiana ==
Constant acquisitions, soon augmented by bequests, required enlargement of the space. Borromeo intended an academy (which opened in 1625) and a collection of pictures, for which a new building was initiated in 1611–18 to house the Cardinal's paintings and drawings, the nucleus of the Pinacoteca. Artwork at the Pinacoteca Ambrosiana includes Leonardo da Vinci's Portrait of a Musician, Caravaggio's Basket of Fruit, Bramantino's Adoration of the Christ Child and Raphael's cartoon of "The School of Athens". The library now contains some 12,000 drawings by European artists, from the 14th through the 19th centuries, which have come from the collections of a wide range of patrons and artists, academicians, collectors, art dealers, and architects.

== Collection ==
The Ambrosiana contains several important manuscript works from classical antiquity and the Renaissance. In 1637, six years after the cardinal's death, the library acquired twelve manuscripts of Leonardo da Vinci, including the Codex Atlanticus, from the Marquis Galeazzo Arconati, who had refused a tempting offer from Thomas Howard, Earl of Arundel. The Codex Atlanticus is the largest single set of drawings by Leonardo. Formed by the sculptor Pompeo Leoni, it incorporates three dismembered notebooks and many single sheets.

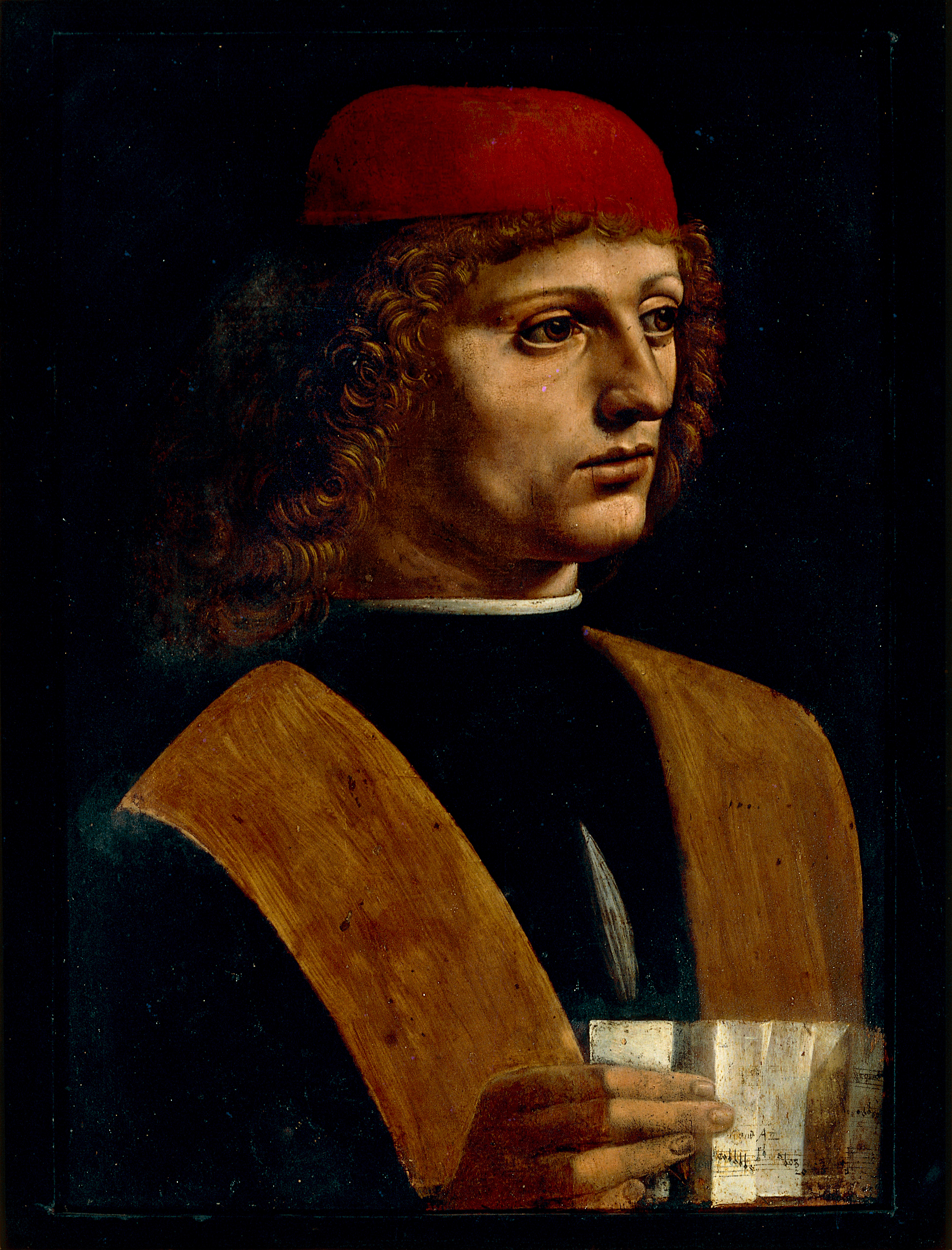
Leonardo's Portrait of a Musician

Among the 30,000 manuscripts, which range from Greek and Latin to Hebrew, Syriac, Arabic, Ethiopian, Turkish and Persian, is the Muratorian fragment, of ca 170 A.D., the earliest example of a Biblical canon and an original copy of De divina proportione by Luca Pacioli. Gian Vincenzo Pinelli's library, purchased by Cardinal Borromeo in 1608, comprises five hundred and fifty manuscripts, including a fourth- or fifth-century illustrated Homer known as 'the Ambrosian Iliad', a tenth- or eleventh-century Horace, a copy of Dante's Divine Comedy written in Padua about 1355, Boccaccio's La Fiammetta annotated by Pietro Bembo, and many antiquarian, humanistic and topical miscellanies. Among Christian and Islamic Arabic manuscripts are treatises on medicine, a unique 11th-century diwan of poets, and the oldest copy of the Kitab Sibawahaihi.

Among the treasures of the library are also a Greek Pentateuch of the fifth century; several palimpsest texts, including an early Plautus, fragments of Ulfilas's Gothic Bible, and a copy of Virgil, with marginal notes by Petrarch.

== College of Doctors ==
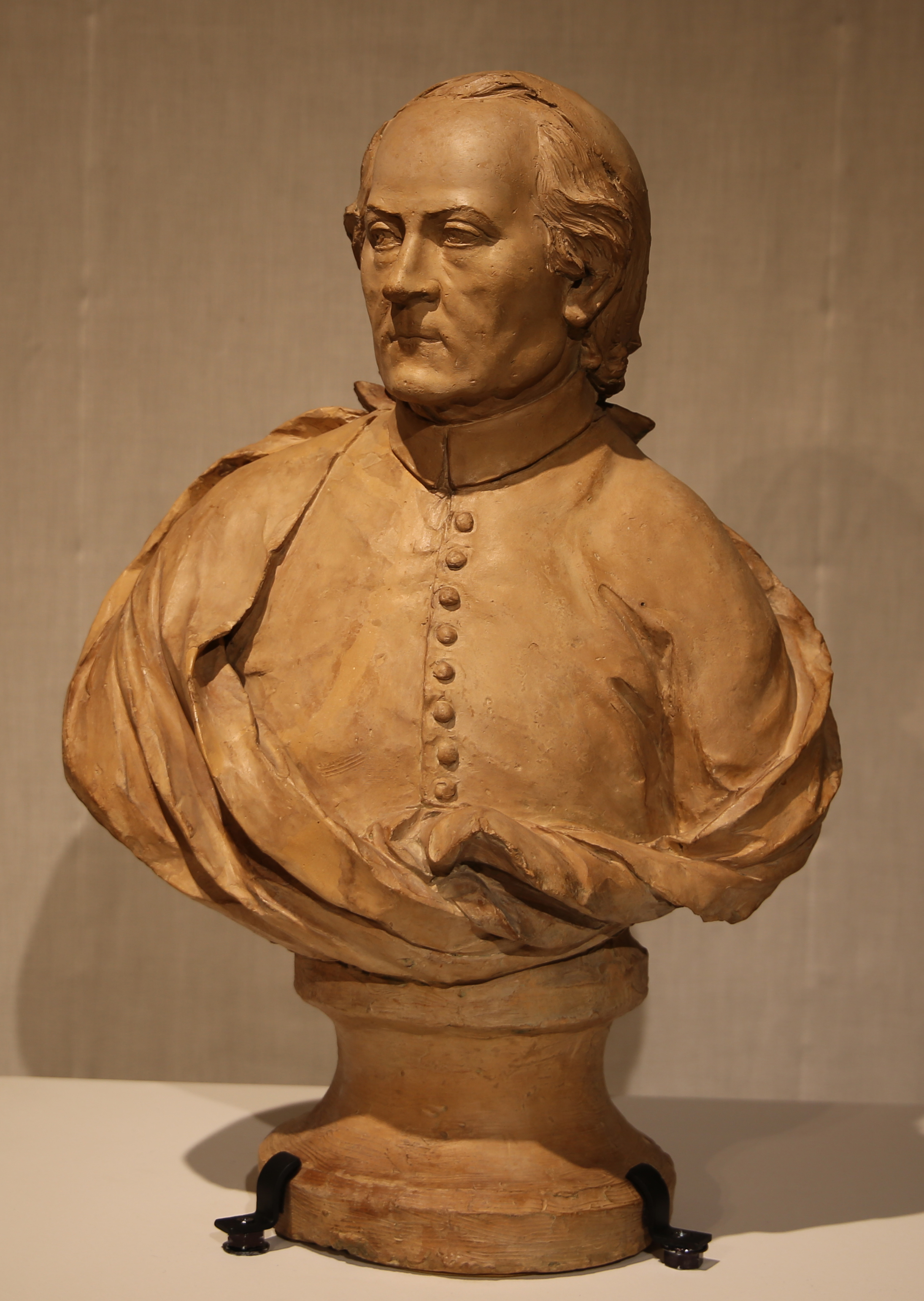
Bust of Ludovico Antonio Muratori by Giovanni Antonio Cybei

The most original feature of the library's constitutions was to separate responsibility for administration from that for the scholarly use of the collections. The former was entrusted to seven conservatori, to include the senior member of the Borromeo family. For the latter purpose, a College of Doctors was instituted. They were encouraged to specialise in different subjects and released from all routine duties, but required to publish a learned work within three years of appointment. The librarian was given onerous responsibilities, among them the purchase of new books and advice to the Doctors on subjects for research.

Among the most prominent doctors of the Ambrosiana have been Giuseppe Ripamonti, Ludovico Antonio Muratori, Giuseppe Antonio Sassi, Cardinal Angelo Mai and, at the beginning of the 20th century, Antonio Maria Ceriani, Achille Ratti (on 8 November 1888), the future Pope Pius XI, and Giovanni Mercati. Ratti wrote a new edition of the Acta Ecclesiae Mediolanensis ("Acts of the Church of Milan"), a Latin work first published by the cardinal Federico Borromeo in 1582.

A handful of clauses in the constitutions reflect the Ambrosiana's ecclesiastical origin: at least four of the Doctors should profess theology, communication with foreigners 'of depraved religion' was forbidden, each Doctor within ten years of his appointment must publish a work on the Virgin Mary to whom the college and library were dedicated.

== Later history ==
Several prized manuscripts, including the Leonardo codices, were requisitioned by the French during the Napoleonic occupation, and only partly returned after 1815. In particular, Leonardo's aerial screw was taken and is still in the Institut de France in Paris.

In 1943, the building was damaged by an Allied air raid. Manuscripts and incunables had been removed and escaped intact, and the damage to the fabric was made good after the war (the paintings are now particularly well displayed), but several volumes perished, including the archives of opera libretti of La Scala. The building was restored in 1952 and underwent major restorations in 1990–97.

== In popular culture ==
The Ambrosiana library was from the beginning open to the public (for four hours a day, now increased to five). The great seventeenth century scholar Gabriel Naudé judged that there were at his time only three libraries in all Europe open to the public, namely the Bodleian, the Ambrosiana and the Angelica. This unique feature was well known to early modern travellers. 'The Bibliotheca Ambrosiana is one of the best Libraries in Italy, because it is not so coy as the others, which scarce let themselves be seen; whereas this opens its dores publikly to all comers and goers, and suffers Them to read what book they please' (Richard Lassels, The Voyage of Italy, 1670).

On 15 October 1816, the Romantic poet Lord Byron visited the library. He was delighted by the letters between Lucrezia Borgia and Pietro Bembo ("The prettiest love letters in the world") and claimed to have managed to steal a lock of her hair ("the prettiest and fairest imaginable.") held on display.

The novelist Mary Shelley visited the library on 14 September 1840 but was disappointed by the tight security occasioned by the recent attempted theft of "some of the relics of Petrarch" housed there.

== Some manuscripts ==
- Uncial 0135 – fragments of the gospels of Matthew, Mark and Luke
- Codex Ambrosianus 435, Ambrosianus 837 – treatise On the Soul of Aristotle
- Minuscule manuscripts of New Testament: 343, 344, 345, 346, 347, 348, 349, 350, 351, 352, 353, 614, 615
- Lectionaries ℓ 102, ℓ 103, ℓ 104, ℓ 105, ℓ 106, ℓ 284, ℓ 285, ℓ 286, ℓ 287, ℓ 288, ℓ 289, ℓ 290.
- Codices Ambrosiani, containing the Gothic language
- ms. D 437 inf. (16th century) containing a copy of the late 13th century Liber colorum secundum magistrum Bernardum

== Bibliography ==
- Catalogus codicum graecorum Bibliothecae Ambrosianae (Mediolani 1906) Tomus I
- Catalogus codicum graecorum Bibliothecae Ambrosianae (Mediolani 1906) Tomus II
- Herbermann, Charles, ed. (1913). "The Ambrosian Library" . Catholic Encyclopedia. New York: Robert Appleton Company.
- Biblioteca Ambrosiana website, select English
- Ambrosiana Foundation, U.S. support organization
- Hobson, Anthony (1970). Great libraries. London: Weidenfeld & Nicolson. pp. 186–94. ISBN 978-0297000990.
- "Inventory Catalog of Drawings at the Biblioteca Ambrosiana". Archived from the original on 28 October 2020.
- "Ambrosian Library" . New International Encyclopedia. 1905.
