= Francesco Rovai =

Florentine-Jewish poet (1605–1647)

- Born: 1605; Grand Duchy of Tuscany
- Died: 1647 (aged 41–42); Grand Duchy of Tuscany
- Other name: Rainero Fucasco
- Occupation: Poet
- Era: Baroque era
- Organization: Accademia degli Apatisti

Francesco Rovai (1605–1647) was a Florentine-Jewish poet during the Baroque era.

== Biography ==
Rovai was a member of the Accademia Degli Alterati and Accademia degli Apatisti, the latter of which was a Florentine society of academics sponsored by the Medici family. He was known there under the name Rainero Fucasco: an anagram of his own name. He was also regarded highly in the Accademia degli Svogliati, having been attested to there as early as 1626, when he was only 21 years old, and he became consul of the organization in 1645. Additionally, he was fluent in Italian, Ancient Greek, Latin, and French.

His prose was influenced by the style of Gabriello Chiabrera, and his writing was imbued with many allusions to ancient mythology and history. He is most known for his posthumous anthology, "Poesi...", which encompassed his many works and was compiled by Niccolo Rovai. There was a possible elogy of him written by English poet John Milton, however any proof that the work was finished no longer exists and the piece is not extant.

== Relationships with other Baroque intellectuals ==
He is mentioned in a letter from Carlo Roberto Dati to Milton. Dati is recorded to have been an enthusiast of Rovai, and even helped plan his funeral, as referenced by Francesco Fontani in his elogy on Dati, stating:

Italian: Dalle riferite espressioni del Vossio para ch'e non volesse aderire alle persuasioni del Dati relativamente al cantar le glorie del Rovai, par eternarne la di lui memoria, ma da una lettera che Carlo medesimo scrisse al celebre Giovanni Milton Inglese affine di indurlo a volere anch' egli fare sullo stesso soggetto alcun poetico componimento, sembra ch'e si laciasse vincere dalle attrattive dell' amicizia, e ner cantasse le lodi. English: From the above-mentioned expressions of Vossius, it seems that he did not want to adhere to Dati's persuasions regarding singing the glories of Rovai, it seems to eternalize his memory, but from a letter that Charles himself wrote to the famous Englishman John Milton in order to induce him to also want to write some poetic composition on the same subject, it seems that he allowed himself to be won over by the attractions of friendship, and sang his praises.

In addition to his high regards by many influential scholars of the time, he was friends with Roman painter Salvator Rosa, as well as Florentine poet Paolo Vendramini of the Vendramin family. Although not friends, Rovai was a big admirer of Italian-Jewish polymath Abramo Colorni.

Art historian Filippo Baldinucci claimed that Lorenzo Lippi had been inspired by Rovai for the Canto I section of his mock epic, Il Malmantile racquistato.

== Sources ==
- Haan, Estelle (1998). From Academia to Amicitia: Milton's Latin Writings and the Italian Academies. American Philosophical Society. ISBN 978-0-87169-886-5.
- Mariani, Ilaria Miarelli (2010-01-01). "Salvator Rosa e il suo tempo, 1615–1673, a cura di S. Ebert-Schifferer, H. Langdon, C. Volpi". Salvator Rosa e Il Suo Tempo, 1615–1673, A Cura di S. Ebert-Schifferer, H. Langdon, C. Volpi, Roma, Campisano Editore: 425–434 – via ResearchGate.
- Rovai, Francesco (1652). Rovai, Niccolo (ed.). Poesie di Francesco Rovai Accademico Fiorentino Dedicate al Serenessimo, e Revendiss. Signor Principe Cardinale Giocarlo di Toscana (in Italian). Nella Stamperia di S.A.S.
