= Anton Maria Salvini =

Italian naturalist and classicist

Reverend Anton Maria Salvini FRS
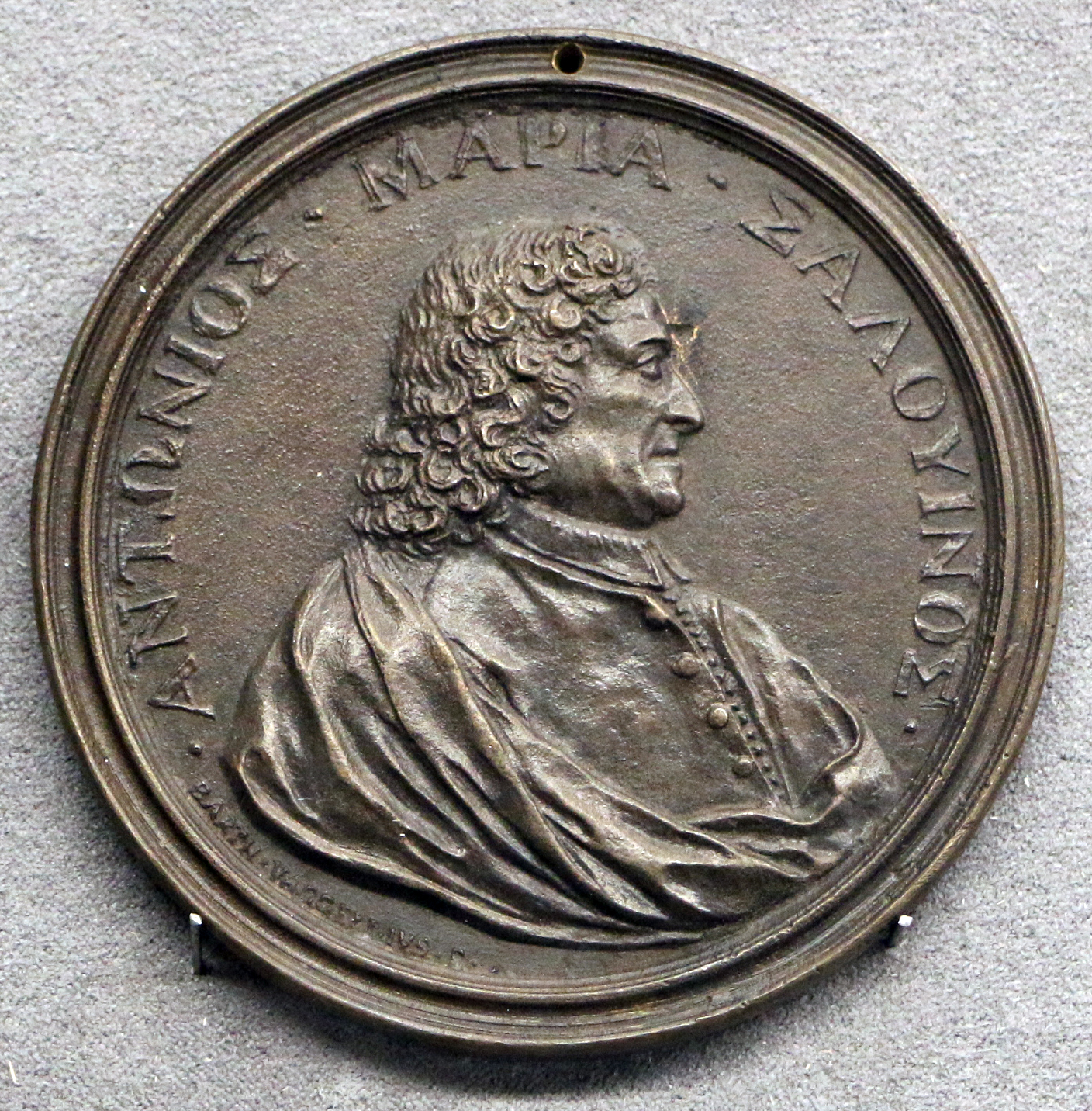
- Medallion with Salvini portrait
- Born: February 12, 1653; Florence, Grand Duchy of Tuscany
- Died: 16 May 1729 (aged 76); Florence, Grand Duchy of Tuscany
- Burial place: Santo Spirito, Florence
- Occupations: Catholic priest, translator, university teacher, hellenist
- Title: abbot
- Parent(s): Andrea Salvini and Eleonora Salvini (née Del Dua)

Academic background
- Education: University of Pisa

Academic work
- Discipline: Hellenist, Classical scholar
- Institutions: University of Florence
- Doctoral students: Giovanni Lami; Antonio Francesco Gori; Anselmo Banduri

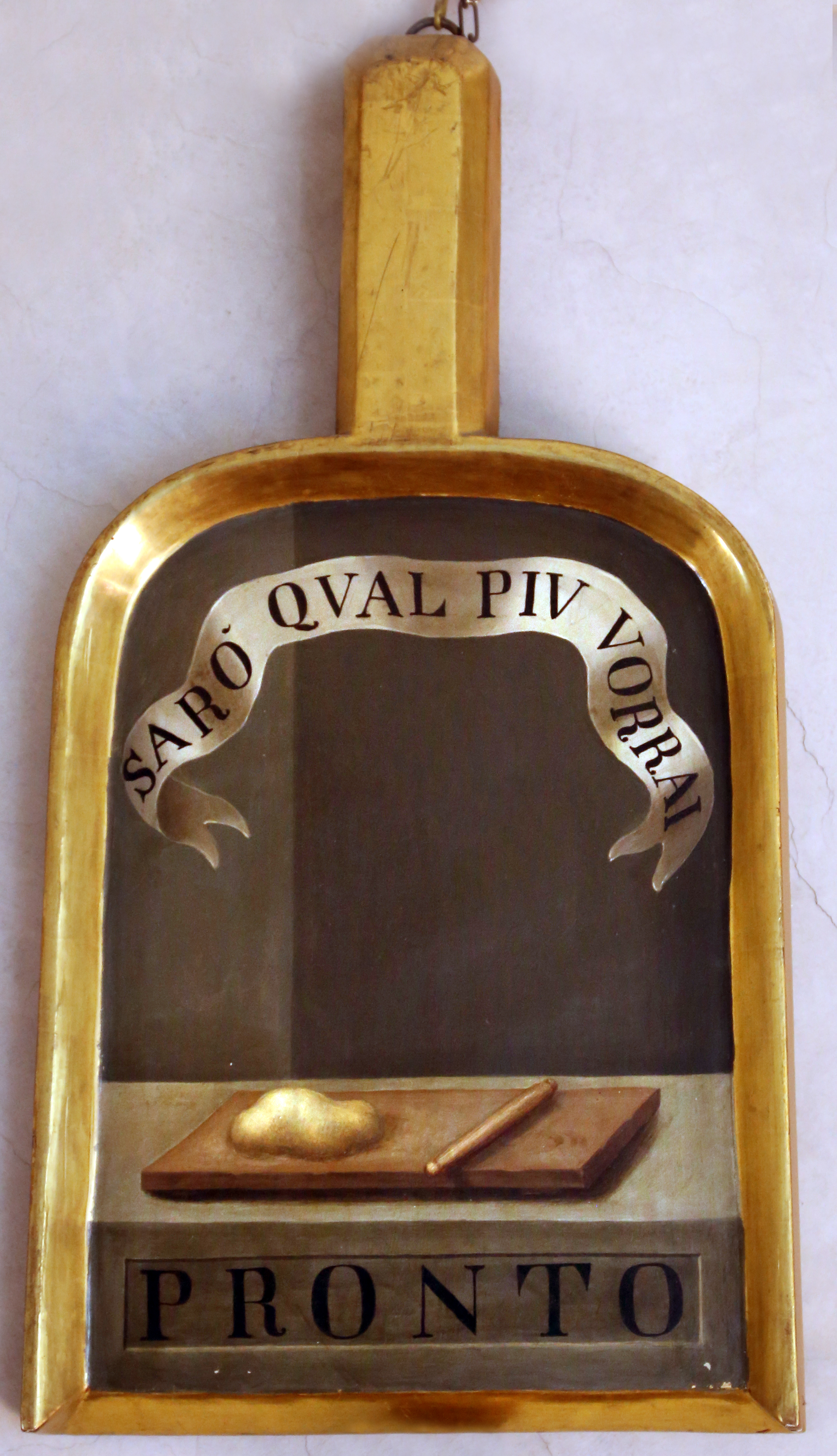
Shovel of Anton Maria Salvini (Pronto) at the Accademia della Crusca

Anton Maria Salvini FRS (12 February 1653 – 16 May 1729) was an Italian naturalist and classicist who lived in Tuscany. An accomplished linguist, he is noted for his translations and editions of Greek and Latin Classics.

== Biography ==
Born in Florence to a prominent family, his brother Salvino Salvini grew up to be also a writer. At the age of 12, he began his studies under Jesuits. Among his fellow students were future cardinal Giovanni Battista Tolomei and future bishop of Florence, Ansaldo Ansaldi (1651–1719). In 1669, he was sent to the University of Pisa to study jurisprudence. That same year, he became a member of the Accademia degli Apatisti, founded in Florence by Agostino Coltellini. At Pisa, he studied ancient Greek under Benedetto Averani.

In 1679, he graduated with a doctorate in canon and civil law. He was sent to work under a lawyer, Andrea Poltri, but passed the time reading and studying texts. He was not functioning well or interested in being a lawyer, but he gained among some the reputation of an excessively erudite polyglot and polymath, profusely quoting the ancient footnote to any new statement. Italian writers of the 19th century, like Foscolo and Settembrini, were strongly repulsed by his urge to base knowledge on recondite and archaic sources. Francesco Redi is said to have commented that: And from a full glasses and overflowing / in such sweet demeanor my heart he touches / That to laugh again will not be enough / He, my Salvini, who has so much tongue in his mouth.

He befriended Benedetto Menzini and Carlo Dati, who had also studied under Redi. With the support of Cardinal Leopoldo de Medici, in 1677 he succeeded Dati as professor of Greek language at the Studio Fiorentino. He was soon admitted as member of the prestigious Accademia Fiorentina and Accademia della Crusca. In 1680, he took to the vestments of a secular abbot. He became a prolific translator of Greco-Roman classics.

Salvini corresponded with scholars all over Europe, including Jean Mabillon, Jean Le Clerc, and Eusèbe Renaudot. He was close friends with the scholars Ludovico Antonio Muratori, Francesco Redi, and Giusto Fontanini. During the early eighteenth century, he formed strong ties with the community of British envoys and expatriates residing in the Grand Duchy of Tuscany, including Henry Newton, John Molesworth, and Henry Davenant, who inspired him to translate Joseph Addison's tragedy Cato into Italian.

Salvini died in Florence on 16 May 1729 and was buried in the cloister of the church of Santo Spirito. On his death, his library and documents were left to the Biblioteca Riccardiana. Among Salvini's pupils were Antonio Francesco Gori, Anselmo Banduri and Giovanni Lami. Salvinia, a genus of floating fern commemorates his name.

== Classical editions and translations ==
Salvini published few works during his lifetime. In 1695, his verse translation of Anacreon appeared, and in the next years, he published translations of the works of Theocritus, Bion and Moschus (1717), the Iliad and the Odyssey (1723), Xenophon of Ephesus' Ephesian Tale (1725), Persius' Satires (1726), Oppian's Halieutica and Cynegetica and Euripides' Cyclops (1728). Several of his translations were published posthumously. Epictetus' Enchiridion and Diogenes Laertius' Lives were published in Florence in 1733, Hesiod's works in 1747, Plato's Euthyphro and Symposium in 1753, Callimachus' Elegies in 1763, Nicander's Theriaca and Alexipharmaca in 1764, the works of Aratus, Coluthus, Musaeus, and Tryphiodorus in 1765, the works of Theognis and Phocylides in 1766, and Lucian's Tragodopodagra and Ocypus in 1807.

== Bibliography ==
- Cordaro, Carmelo (1906). Anton Maria Salvini. Saggio critico biografico. Piacenza: Bertola & c.
- Trabalza, Ciro (1908). Storia della grammatica italiana. Milan: Hoepli.
- Paoli, Maria Pia (2005). "Anton Maria Salvini (1653-1729). Il ritratto di un letterato nella Firenze di fine Seicento" (PDF). Naples, Rome, Florence: Une histoire comparée des milieux intellectuels italiens (XVII-XVIIIe siècles). Rome: École française de Rome: 501–544. Archived from the original (PDF) on 9 May 2006.
- Bianchi, Nunzio (2006). Il codice del romanzo. Tradizione manoscritta e ricezione dei romanzi greci. Bari: Dedalo. pp. 83–147. ISBN 9788822058126.
- Paoli, Maria Pia (2017). "SALVINI, Anton Maria". Dizionario Biografico degli Italiani (in Italian). Vol. 90: Salvestrini–Saviozzo da Siena. Rome: Institute of the Italian Encyclopaedia. ISBN 978-88-12-00032-6.
