= Antonio Malatesti =

Italian poet (1610–1672)

- Born: 1610; Florence, Grand Duchy of Tuscany
- Died: 27 December 1672 (aged 61–62); Florence, Grand Duchy of Tuscany
- Resting place: Santa Croce, Florence
- Occupations: Poet; Intellectual
- Father: Emilio Malatesti
- Writing career
- Pen name: Alamonio Transetti; Aminta Setaiolo
- Language: Italian
- Genre: Comic poetry
- Notable works: La Sfinge; La Tina: Equivoci Rusticali
- Movements: Baroque; Neoclassicism

Antonio Malatesti (1610 – 27 December 1672) was an Italian comic poet of the Seicento.

== Biography ==
Antonio Malatesti was born in Florence in 1610. He studied astronomy with Torricelli's disciple Ludovico Serenai and painting with Lorenzo Lippi. He devoted himself to commerce until Lorenzo and Mattias de' Medici's patronage allowed him to dedicate himself to poetry.

Malatesti was a leading member of the Accademia degli Apatisti, which he joined between 1632 and 1634, assuming the anagrammatic pseudonyms of Alamonio Transetti and Aminta Setaiolo.

In 1640 he published La Sfinge, a collection of enigmatic riddles in verse form. In the same period he composed La Tina, a collection of 50 equivocal, rustic sonnets which he dedicated and presented to John Milton on the occasion of his visit to Florence in September 1638. The sole surviving manuscript of La Tina has only very recently come to light.

Malatesti died of a stroke in Florence in 1672. He was buried in Santa Croce. His last work, Il brindisi de' Ciclopi, was published posthumously in 1673. It consists of a series of toasts in sonnet form delivered by Cyclopes to celebrate the victory of Polyphemus over his rival Acis, whom he crushed beneath a rock for being more acceptable to Galatea.

Malatesti was a close friend of Carlo Roberto Dati and Agostino Coltellini and corresponded with Antonio Magliabechi and Angelico Aprosio. Some of his works, including the satirical poem La Chimera, and the epic Rinaldo infuriato, were never published, and are preserved among the Manuscripts in the National Central Library of Florence.

== Works ==
Of special interest to English readers is La Tina, a good example of the rustic poetry so much in vogue in Florence since Lorenzo de' Medici wrote the Nencia da Barberino. La Tina is composed of a series of sonnets with a double meaning, addressed by a farmer to his lady love. This work was probably first published in London in 1757, with a dedication by Malatesti to Milton. Ettore Allodoli, who, like Pietro Fanfani before him, attempted to trace its history, asserts that the sonnets may have been a gift to Milton when he was in Florence in 1638, and that the English poet, being aware of their levity, accepted the manuscript and prudently put it away. Later it was discovered and was published, either in London in 1757 or, as seems more likely, much later - 1837 - in Venice.

Malatesti's best-known work is his Sfinge, the first part of which appeared in Venice, printed by Sarzina, 1640; the second part was printed in Florence, Stamperia di S. A. S., 1643; both of them, with a third part, appeared in Florence, alla Passione, 1683. The first part contains 110 enigmatic sonnets; the second, 106 more; the third, 53 sonnets, 57 octaves, and 66 quatrains dealing with the card game of Minchiate. Each part is followed by an Edipo, giving the solutions of the riddles and copious explanatory notes. Pietro Fanfani edited the three sonnet cycles, La Sfinge, i Brindisi de' Ciclopi e la Tina, Milan, Corradetti, 1865, with a lengthy introduction (pp. I-XXXI) and Giovanni Lami's "Notizie intorno all'autore" (pp. 295-298). In 1913, Ettore Allodoli edited the Sfinge and the Tina. He omitted the game of Minchiate because he found it uninteresting. In 1897, printed at Trani, and extracted from the Rassegna Pugliese, Anno XIII, fasc. 7, there appeared Una "Corona di enigmi" di Antonio Malatesti, with an Introduction by Clemente Valacca. The riddles in this "Corona" are twelve in number, all of them octaves; eight had already appeared in the third part of the Sfinge. Still more riddles, most of them obscene, are in manuscript in the Marucelliana Library in Florence. A collection of Enimmi ossieno Indovinelli piacevoli e galanti d'Antonio Malatesti, finora inediti, pubblicati e illustrati da Modesto Rastrelli, preceded by the life of the author, has been published in Florence by A. Benucci (1782).

== In fiction ==
Lorenzo Lippi gave Malatesti a very prominent place in his mock-heroic epic Il Malmantile racquistato. In this poem Malatesti bears the anagrammatic name of Amostante Latoni, and marries the heroine, Celidora. The Argomenti, or themes, that precede each canto of Lippi's poem were conceived by Malatesti.

== List of works ==
- Pietro Fanfani, ed. (1865). La sfinge, I brindisi de' Ciclopi e la Tina. Milan: Corradetti.
- Ettore Allodoli, ed. (1913). La sfinge, enimmi (PDF). Lanciano: Carabba.
- Davide Messina, ed. (2014). Antonio Malatesti, 'La Tina': Equivoci rusticali. MHRA. ISBN 978-1781880524.

== Bibliography ==
- Rossi, Giuseppe Aldo (2001). "L'enigmografia italiana nel XVII secolo. Da Antonio Malatesti a Francesco Moneti". Enigmistica: Il gioco degli enigmi dagli albori ai giorni nostri. Hoepli: 103–112. ISBN 9788820327224.
- Chiarelli, Francesca (2002). "Malatesti, Antonio". The Oxford Companion to Italian Literature. Oxford University Press. ISBN 978-0-19-818332-7.
- De Miranda, Girolamo (2007). "MALATESTI, Antonio". Dizionario Biografico degli Italiani (in Italian). Vol. 68: Malatacca–Mangelli. Rome: Institute of the Italian Encyclopaedia. ISBN 978-88-12-00032-6.
- Messina, Davide (2011). "La Tina Regained". Milton Quarterly. 45 (2): 118–122. doi:10.1111/j.1094-348X.2011.00278.x. JSTOR 24461952.
