= Francesco Rondinelli =

Italian scholar (1589–1665)

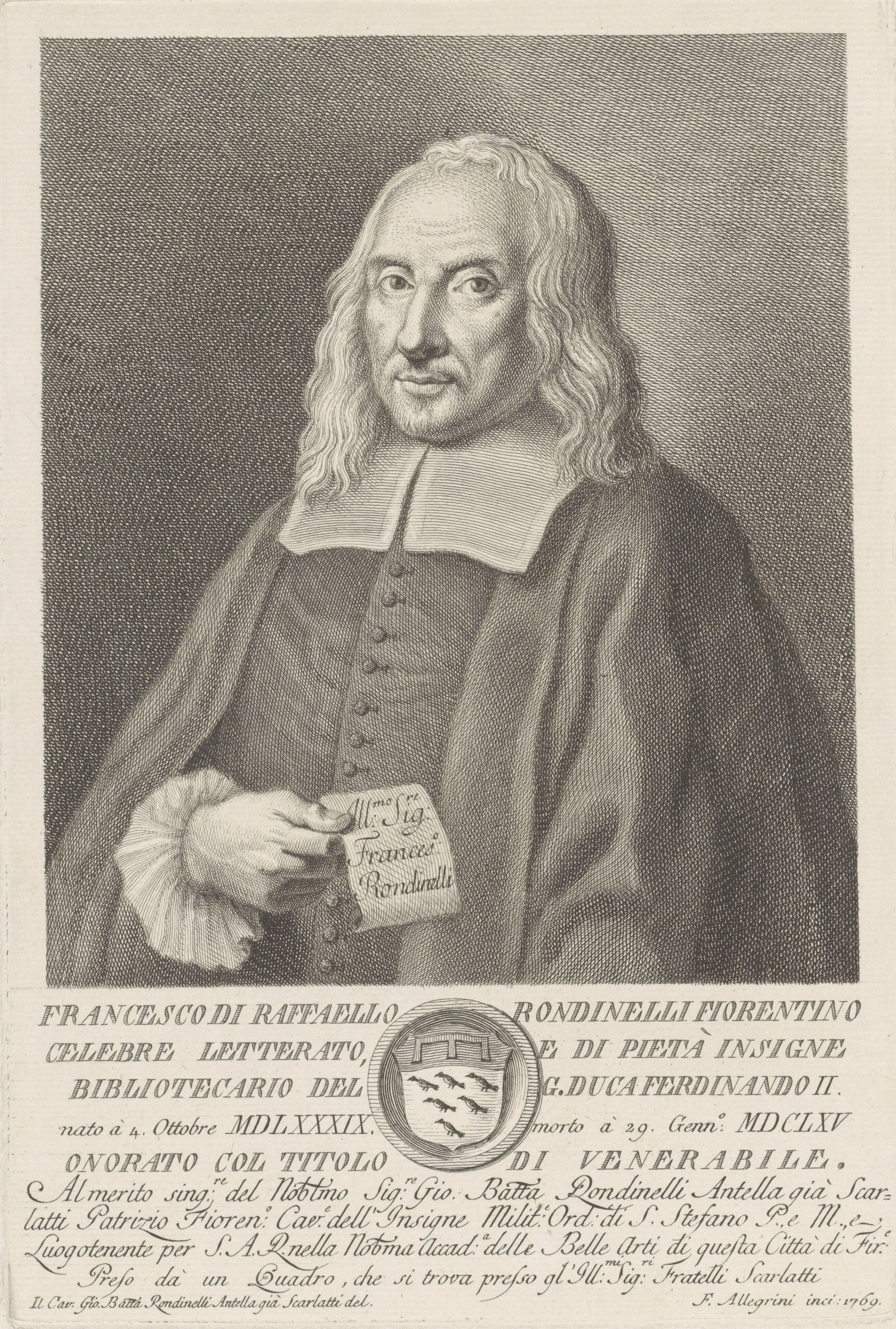
- Francesco Rondinelli
- Born: 4 October 1589; Florence, Grand Duchy of Tuscany
- Died: 30 January 1665 (aged 75); Florence, Grand Duchy of Tuscany
- Resting place: Basilica of San Lorenzo, Florence
- Education: University of Pisa
- Occupations: Writer; Scholar; Academic; Librarian
- Parent(s): Raffaello Rondinelli; Ortensia Rondinelli
- Writing career
- Language: Italian
- Notable work: Relazione del contagio stato in Firenze l’anno 1630, e 1633
- Literary movement: Baroque; Neoclassicism

Francesco Rondinelli (4 October 1589 – 30 January 1665) was a Florentine scholar and academic of the Seicento.

== Biography ==
Francesco Rondinelli was born in Florence on October 4, 1589 to Raffaello and Ortensia Rondinelli. He studied at the University of Pisa. Rondinelli was a prominent member of the Accademia Fiorentina and of the Accademia della Crusca. He participated in the drafting of the third edition of the Vocabolario degli Accademici della Crusca (Vocabulary of the Members of the Accademia della Crusca, 1691). Rondinelli was also a member of the Accademia degli Svogliati, founded in Florence by Jacopo Gaddi, and of the Accademia degli Apatisti. In 1635, Ferdinando II de' Medici awarded him the position of Librarian of the Grand Duchy of Tuscany, and appointed him tutor to the future Grand Duchess, Vittoria della Rovere. Rondinelli was a close friend of Alessandro Adimari, Gabriello Chiabrera, Fulvio Testi, Carlo Roberto Dati and Michelangelo Buonarroti the Younger. He devised the programme for Pietro da Cortona's fresco cycle in the so-called Planetary Rooms at Palazzo Pitti.

== Works ==
Rondinelli’s masterpiece is the Relazione del Contagio Stato in Firenze l’anno 1630 e 1633, an account of the epidemic that struck Florence in the early 1630s. The work was commissioned to Rondinelli by the Grand Duke Ferdinando II and is based official records and interviews with survivors. A carefully crafted narrative written in an elegant Italian prose, the Relazione was first published in 1634 and reissued in 1714. The second edition contained additional material on all the major epidemics which had occurred throughout the world. The Preface of this later edition contains a brief biography of Rondinelli.

Rondinelli wrote a biography of the Florentine humanist Bernardo Davanzati, published at Florence in 1638 and reissued several times thereafter.

== List of works ==
- Relazione del contagio stato in Firenze l'anno 1630, e 1633. Florence: per Gio. Batista Landini. 1634.
- Relazione delle nozze degli dei fauola dell'abate Gio. Carlo Coppola rappresenta nelle nozze de' sereniss. gran duchi di Toscana Ferdinando II e Vittoria principessa d'Urbino. Florence: nella nuoua stamperia del Massi, e Landi. 1637.

== Bibliography ==
- "Elogio di Francesco Rondinelli". Elogj degli uomini illustri Toscani. 4. Lucca: Giuseppe Allegrini: 401–405. 1774.
- Santi, Vincenzo (1912). Vita e opere di Francesco Rondinelli (1589-1664). Bologna: tip. Salesiana.
- Calvi, Giulia (1989). Histories of a plague year. The social and the imaginary in Baroque Florence. Translated by Dario Biocca and Bryant T. Ragan Jr. Berkeley, Los Angeles: University of California Press. ISBN 978-0520057999.
- Mirto, Alfonso (2017). "RONDINELLI, Francesco". Dizionario Biografico degli Italiani (in Italian). Vol. 88: Robusti–Roverella. Rome: Istituto dell'Enciclopedia Italiana. ISBN 978-88-12-00032-6.
