= Bernardo Davanzati =

Italian economist and agronomist (1529–1606)

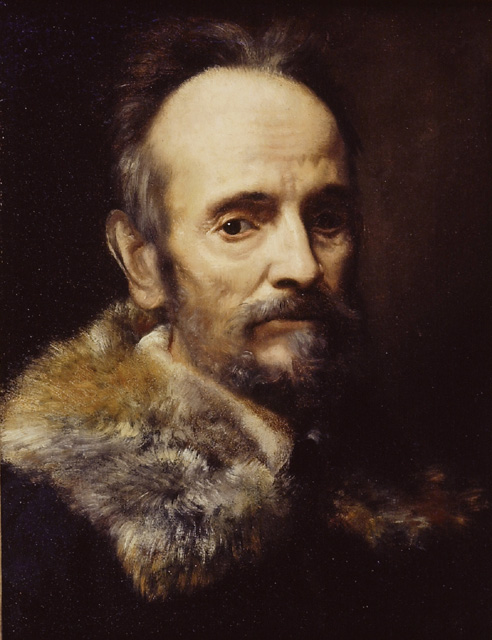
- Bernardo Davanzati, portrait by Cristofano Allori
- Born: 31 August 1529; Florence, Republic of Florence
- Died: 29 March 1606 (aged 76); Florence, Grand Duchy of Tuscany
- Resting place: Santa Trinita
- Occupations: Renaissance humanist; Intellectual; Economist
- Known for: Italian translation of Tacitus
- Spouse: Francesca Federighi (m. 1572)
- Children: 4
- Parent(s): Antonfrancesco Davanzati and Lucrezia Davanzati (née Ginori)
- Writing career
- Language: Italian
- Genres: translation; treatise
- Movement: Renaissance

Bernardo Davanzati (Italian pronunciation: [berˈnardo da.vanˈt͡sa.ti]; 31 August 1529 – 29 March 1606) was an Italian agronomist, economist and translator. Davanzati was a major translator of Tacitus. He also attempted the concision of Tacitus in his own Italian prose, taking a motto Strictius Arctius reflecting his ambition. The writings of Davanzati are still models of style.

== Biography ==
Bernardo Davanzati was bom in Florence on August 8, 1529. He was the scion of a patrician Florentine family. By devoting himself to trade, first in Lyon and later at home, he made a large fortune which permitted him to dedicate much of his industrious life to historical research and literature. He was a founding member of the Accademia della Crusca and a leading member of the Florentine Academy, of which he was elected Consul in 1575. Bernardo wrote with lively elegance and rare conciseness on many different subjects.

In order to refute the charge of prolixity advanced against the Italians by the French scholar Henri Estienne, he undertook a translation of Tacitus' writings in which he succeeded in being more concise than the Latin original. In his work, Davanzati benefited from the help of leading classical scholars of the age, most notably Curzio Picchena, who published an important edition of Tacitus in 1607. Davanzati published his translation with the text opposite to it, and proved, page for page, that the Italian version, without omitting a word of the text, was often shorter, but never longer, than the original. Davanzati's translation is widely considered a classic of Italian literature. The Academicians Della Crusca have sanctioned the high merit of this work, by rejecting every other translation of Tacitus, and by quoting very often that of Davanzati in their Vocabolario.

In 1582 Davanzati completed his translation of the preface to the Hero's Pneumatica, which under the title Della natura del voto he dedicated to the architect and painter Bernardo Buontalenti. The manuscript is Firenze, BNCF, Banco Rari 223. The translation was published posthumously in 1862.

His Scisma d'Inghilterra [The Anglican Schism], an account of contemporary English history first published in Rome in 1602. It was a concise version of a work of Girolamo Pollini, on the English Reformation, which itself was dependent on a Latin work of 1585 written by Nicholas Sander and Edward Rishton. John Milton used its imprimaturs (from the 1638 edition) as an illustration on his Areopagitica.

Davanzati was a close friend of Filippo Sassetti. Writing Davanzati in 1585, Sassetti noted some word similarities between Sanskrit and Italian (e.g. deva/dio 'God', sarpa/serpe 'snake', sapta/sette 'seven', ashta/otto 'eight', nava/nove 'nine'). This observation is today credited to have foreshadowed the later discovery of the Indo-European language family.

A Life of Davanzati by the Florentine scholar Francesco Rondinelli was published at Florence in 1638.

== Economic works and theories ==
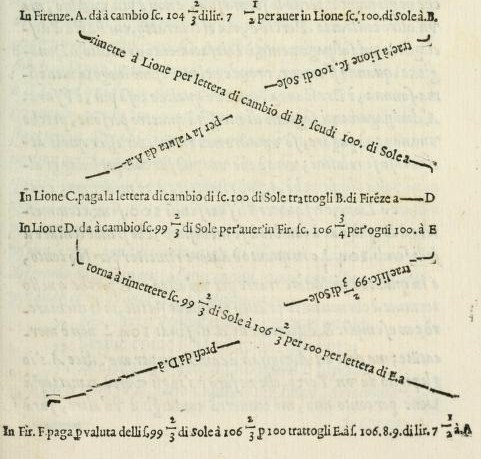
Diagram illustrating the working of exchange rates from Davanzati's ''Notizie dei cambi

Davanzati wrote on economics as a metallist. His works included Lezione delle monete (1588) and Notizie dei cambi (1582). Davanzati's Discourse upon Coins was translated by John Toland (London: Awnsham and John Churchil, 1696) from the original 1588 edition.

The two treatises are included in Pietro Custodi’s Scrittori classici italiani di economia politica. To judge him correctly it must be considered that he was a contemporary of Gasparo Scaruffi (1582), of Jean Bodin (1578), and of William Stafford (1581), men who wrote their books half a century before Petty and Locke were born (Petty, 1623-1687; Locke, 1632-1704). Davanzati begins his Lezione delle monete by showing how “barter is a necessary complement of division of labour amongst men and amongst nations”; he then passes on to show how there is easily a “want of coincidence in barter,” which calls for a “medium of exchange”; and this must be capable of “subdivision,” and be a “store of value.” He then goes off upon a historical digression on currencies, and on returning from thence recognises in money “a common measure of value.” This leads him to a dissertation on the causes of value in general, in which respect his remarks are also worth mentioning, because he has clearly shown that utility and value are “accidents of things” and functions of the “quantity in which they exist.” Proceeding to examples, he remarks “that one single egg was more worth to Count Ugolino in his tower than all the gold of the world,” but that, on the other hand, “ten thousand grains of corn are only worth one of gold in the market,” and that “water, however necessary for life, is worth nothing, because superabundant.” In the siege of Casilinum “a rat was sold for 200 florins, and the price could not be called exaggerated, because next day the man who sold it was starved and the man who bought it was still alive.” Returning to his argument, he says all the money in a country is worth all the goods, because the one exchanges for the other and nobody wants money for its own sake. Davanzati does not know anything about the rapidity of circulation of money, and only says every country needs a different quantity of money, as different human frames need different quantities of blood. The rest of his treatise is directed against artificial deterioration of money. The mint ought to coin money gratuitously for everybody; and the fear that, if the coins are too good, they should be exported is simply illusory, because they must have been paid for by the exporter. Davanzati insists particularly on the injury the defrauding government is the first to experience when it tampers with the coin. In his essay on exchanges Davanzati goes minutely into the mechanism of exchanges, but he evidently does not suspect the causes of the phenomenon nor its limits.

== Notes ==
=== Works cited ===
- Pantaleoni, Maffeo (1894). "Davanzati, Bernardo". Dictionary of Political Economy. Vol. 1. London: Macmillan and Company. p. 482-483.
- Zaccaria, Raffaella (1987). "Davanzati, Bernardo". Dizionario Biografico degli Italiani (in Italian). Vol. 33: D'Asaro–De Foresta. Rome: Istituto dell'Enciclopedia Italiana. ISBN 978-88-12-00032-6.
- Bartera, Salvador (2015). "Tacitus in Italy". Hermathena (199): 159–196. JSTOR 26921697.
