= Benedetto Fioretti =

Italian scholar (1579-1642)

- Born: October 18, 1579; Mercatale, Grand Duchy of Tuscany
- Died: 30 June 1642 (aged 62); Florence, Grand Duchy of Tuscany
- Other name: Udeno Nisiely
- Occupations: Philologist; Literary theorist; Scholar
- Father: Giovan Battista Fioretti

Academic work
- Discipline: Literary criticism, Italian studies, Classics

Benedetto Fioretti, also known under his academic name, Udeno Nisiely (1579—1642) was an Italian philologist, literary theorist and scholar.

== Biography ==
Benedetto Fioretti was born at Mercatale in the diocese of Pistoia, October 18, 1579. His first attempts at poetry meeting with no success, he devoted himself to compiling a great work about poetry. The result is almost indescribable. Fioretti brings together not only all that prolonged study could discover on the subject of poetry and the various branches of poetry, but also a great part of what has been said on particular poets and on their poems. His lists of authorities are imposing, and the minutiae with which he is mainly concerned give his pages a forbidding aspect. There is almost no attempt at arrangement. The book is called Proginnasmi Poetici, and was published in five volumes in Florence, 1620–1639. This encyclopedia was successful throughout the seventeenth century and was reprinted after the author's death. Fioretti's Proginnasmi are considered a forerunner of Francesco Saverio Quadrio's famous work Della storia e della ragione di ogni poesia. Fioretti belonged to the Florentine Accademia degli Apatisti and, after the founder Agostino Coltellini, was its most enthusiastic promoter. His fellow academicians included Carlo Roberto Dati and Benedetto Buommattei. He was an acquaintance of Milton during the latter's stay in Italy. Towards the end of his life he turned to religious and ethical themes. His Esercizi Morali began to appear in 1633; his Osservazioni di Creanze only came out in 1675. Fioretti died in Florence on June 30, 1642.

== Works ==
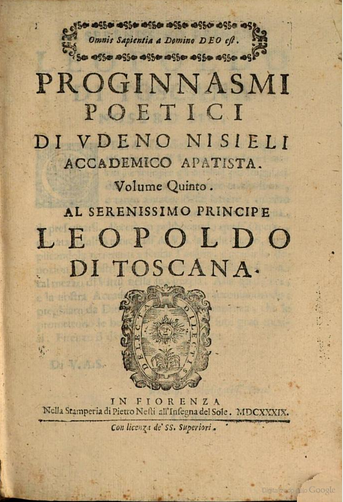
Proginnasmi poetici, 1639.

- Fioretti, Benedetto (1627). Polifemo Briaco. Florence: Cecconcelli.
- Fioretti, Benedetto (1620). Proginnasmi poetici. Vol. 1. Florence: appresso Zanobi Pignoni.
- Fioretti, Benedetto (1620). Proginnasmi poetici. Vol. 2. Florence: appresso Zanobi Pignoni.
- Fioretti, Benedetto (1627). Proginnasmi poetici. Vol. 3. Florence: appresso Zanobi Pignoni.
- Fioretti, Benedetto (1638). Proginnasmi poetici. Vol. 4. Florence: nella Stamperia di Zanobi Pignoni.
- Fioretti, Benedetto (1639). Proginnasmi poetici. Vol. 5. Florence: nella stamperia di Pietro Nesti all'insegna del Sole.
- Fioretti, Benedetto (1633). Esercizi morali. Florence.
- Fioretti, Benedetto (1641). Rimario e Sillabario. Florence: per Zanobi Pignoni.

== Bibliography ==
- Hutton, James (1935). The Greek Anthology in Italy to the Year 1800. Ithaca: Cornell University Press. pp. 361–2.
- Formichetti, Gianfranco (1997). "FIORETTI, Benedetto". Dizionario Biografico degli Italiani (in Italian). Vol. 48: Filoni–Forghieri. Rome: Istituto dell'Enciclopedia Italiana. ISBN 978-88-12-00032-6.
- Diffley, P. (2002). "Fioretti, Benedetto". The Oxford Companion to Italian Literature. Oxford University Press. ISBN 978-0-19-818332-7.
