= Lodovico Adimari =

Italian poet and playwright (1644–1708)

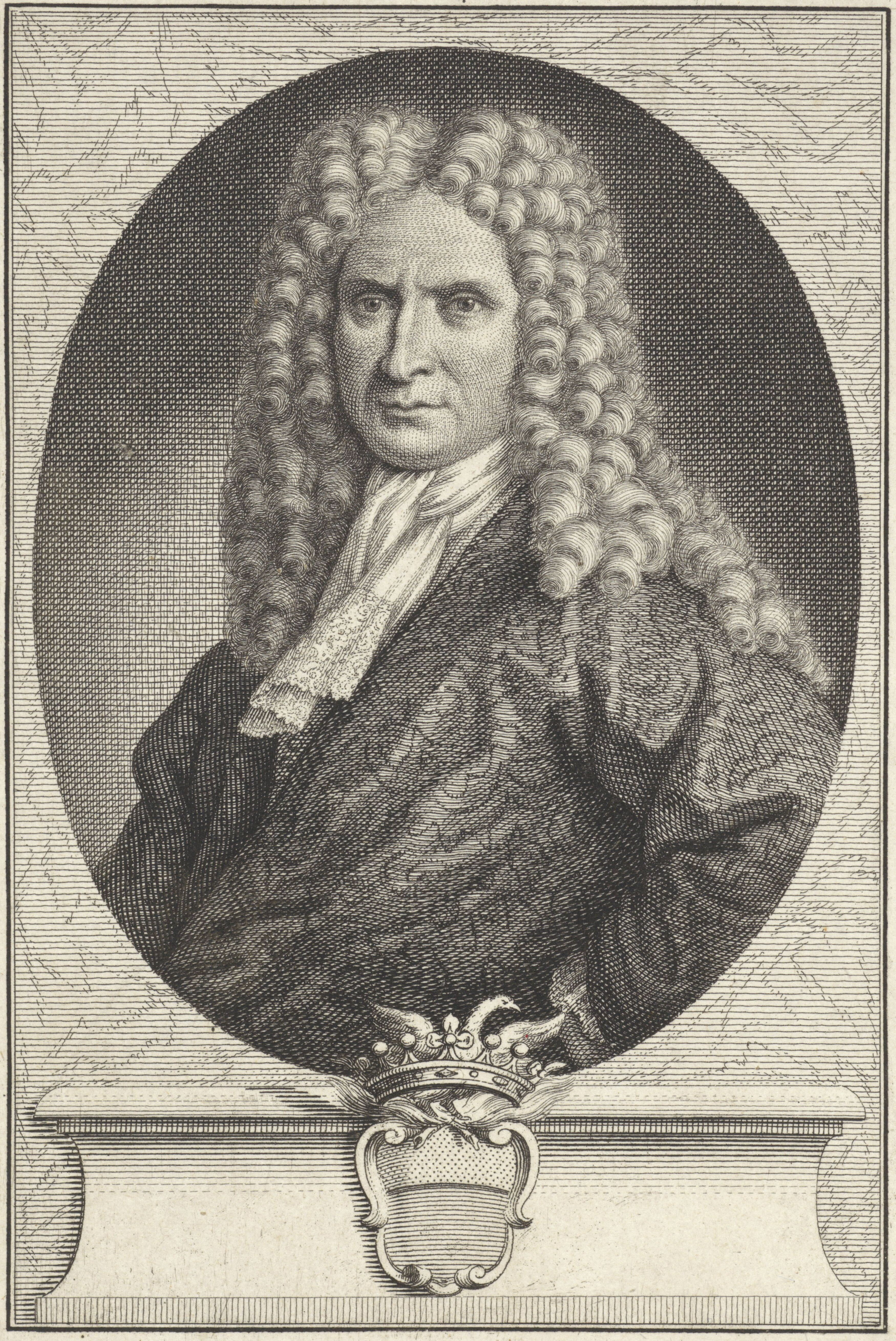
- Portrait of Lodovico Adimari. Copperplate engraving by Pompeo Lapi after Pietro Dandini
- Born: September 3, 1644; Naples, Kingdom of Naples
- Died: 22 June 1708 (aged 63); Florence, Grand Duchy of Tuscany
- Occupations: Poet; Playwright
- Writing career
- Language: Italian
- Period: from 1690
- Notable work: Satire
- Literary movement: Baroque; Neoclassicism

Lodovico Adimari (3 September 1644 – 22 June 1708) was an Italian poet and playwright.

== Biography ==
Adimari was born in Naples on 3 September 1644. He studied at the universities of Pisa and Florence, and lived for a several years at the court of Duke Ferdinando Carlo Gonzaga in Mantua. The Duke made him Marchese and his Chamber gentleman. Back in Florence, Adimari joined the Accademia della Crusca, and worked on the academy's edition of Petrarch and the fourth edition of the Vocabolario degli Accademici della Crusca. He succeeded Francesco Redi in the Florentine chair of Italian language. He died in Florence on 22 June 1708. Adimari was a member of the Accademia Fiorentina and of the Accademia degli Apatisti.

== Works ==
Adimari is best known for his five satires, composed between 1690 and 1700, which are violently anti-feminist (earlier, in 1685, he was accused of killing his wife). His three volumes of sonnets (1671, 1693, and 1696) bear some debt to Marino's early lyric poetry, but shun excessive displays of metaphor and sensuality. He published three comedies, two of which are reworkings of works by Jacinto de Herrera Sotomayor and Thomas Corneille. He wrote an excellent paraphrase of the Penitential Psalms.

== Bibliography ==
- Media related to Lodovico Adimari at Wikimedia Commons
- Provenzal, Dino (1900). Quando furono scritte le Satire di Lodovico Adimari. Rocca S. Casciano: Licinio Cappelli.
- Provenzal, Dino (1902). La vita e le opere di Lodovico Adimari. Rocca S. Casciano: Licinio Cappelli.
- Belloni, Antonio (1943). Il Seicento. Milan: Francesco Vallardi. p. 294-297.
- D'Addario, Arnaldo (1960). "ADIMARI, Lodovico". Dizionario Biografico degli Italiani (in Italian). Vol. 1: Aaron–Albertucci. Rome: Istituto dell'Enciclopedia Italiana. OCLC 883370.
