= Carlo Antonio Stendardi =

- Born: August , 1721; Siena, Grand Duchy of Tuscany (now Italy)
- Died: July 6, 1764 (aged 42); Florence, Grand Duchy of Tuscany (now Italy)
- Occupations: Traveler, diplomat
- Parent(s): Francesco Stendardi and Urania Stendardi (née Venturi)

Carlo Antonio Stendardi (August 1721 – 6 July 1764) was an Italian traveler to the Ottoman Empire and North African state of Algeria.

== Biography ==
He was born in Siena to a prominent Florentine family; his father however died when he was merely months of age. Seeking advancement and profit, he spent the next three years in a trip to Smyrna (present-day İzmir in Turkey). Returning to Florence, he continued studies. In 1748, the new Grand Ducal government of Tuscany sent him for some months as an Austrian Imperial commissioner to Istanbul. He was recalled later than year to become a diplomat to the Algerian state, which was negotiating treaties with the Austrian and Tuscan authorities. His letters from this time include a depiction of these lands, cultures, and government. In one of the missions, he was able to negotiate the freedom of imprisoned Austrian sailors at Algeria. After seven years, he had to leave Algeria, whose relations with the Christian states was worsening. Stendardi was able to extricate a collection of Roman medals and marble inscriptions.

Upon his return, he was named ambassador to the Kingdom of Naples, where he continued his observation and collection of antiques. Returning to Florence after 5 years, he was a member of the Accademia Colombaria, the Accademia Fiorentina, and the Accademia degli Apatisti. He died of a stroke in Florence in 1764.

Among his works are the following treatises and essays:

- Governo d’Algieri
- Commercio di Algieri
- Relazione della peste d’Algieri negli anni di Cristo 1752-1753
- Meteore ed altri fenomeni osservati in Algieri nell’anno 1753 incominciando dall’equinozio autunnale del 1752
- Relazione della tragica morte di Mehemet Pascià bey d’Algieri (murder of Ahmed Bey el Kolli) succeduta nel dì 11 di dicembre dell’anno 1754
- Saggio astronomico, Descrizione dei suoi viaggi al Vesuvio, Divinizzazione sopra la luce in Napoli nel 1756.

== Bibliography ==
- Obituary in Il Corrier Letterario, Florence (1766) pages 594–596.
- Surdich, Francesco (2019). "STENDARDI, Carlo Antonio". Dizionario Biografico degli Italiani (in Italian). Vol. 94: Stampa–Tarantelli. Rome: Istituto dell'Enciclopedia Italiana. ISBN 978-88-12-00032-6.
