= Frosino Lapini =

16th-century Italian philosopher

Frosino Lapini (circa 1520 – after 1568) was an Italian priest philosopher, translator, and humanist scholar of the Renaissance. He was born and lived in Florence. His first name was likely shortened from Eufrosino. He was a founder of the literary Accademia de' Lucidi. he served as a tutor in Florence, among his pupils were Giorgio Bartoli, Lorenzo Giacomini, Francesco Pucci, and Filippo Sassetti. He championed and wrote about the works of Petrarch and Pico di Mirandola.

== Bibliography ==
- Girimonti Grippi, Giuseppe (2004). "LAPINI, Frosino". Dizionario Biografico degli Italiani (in Italian). Vol. 63: Labroca–Laterza. Rome: Istituto dell'Enciclopedia Italiana. ISBN 978-88-12-00032-6.
