= Carlo Antonio Manzini =

Italian astronomer and mathematician

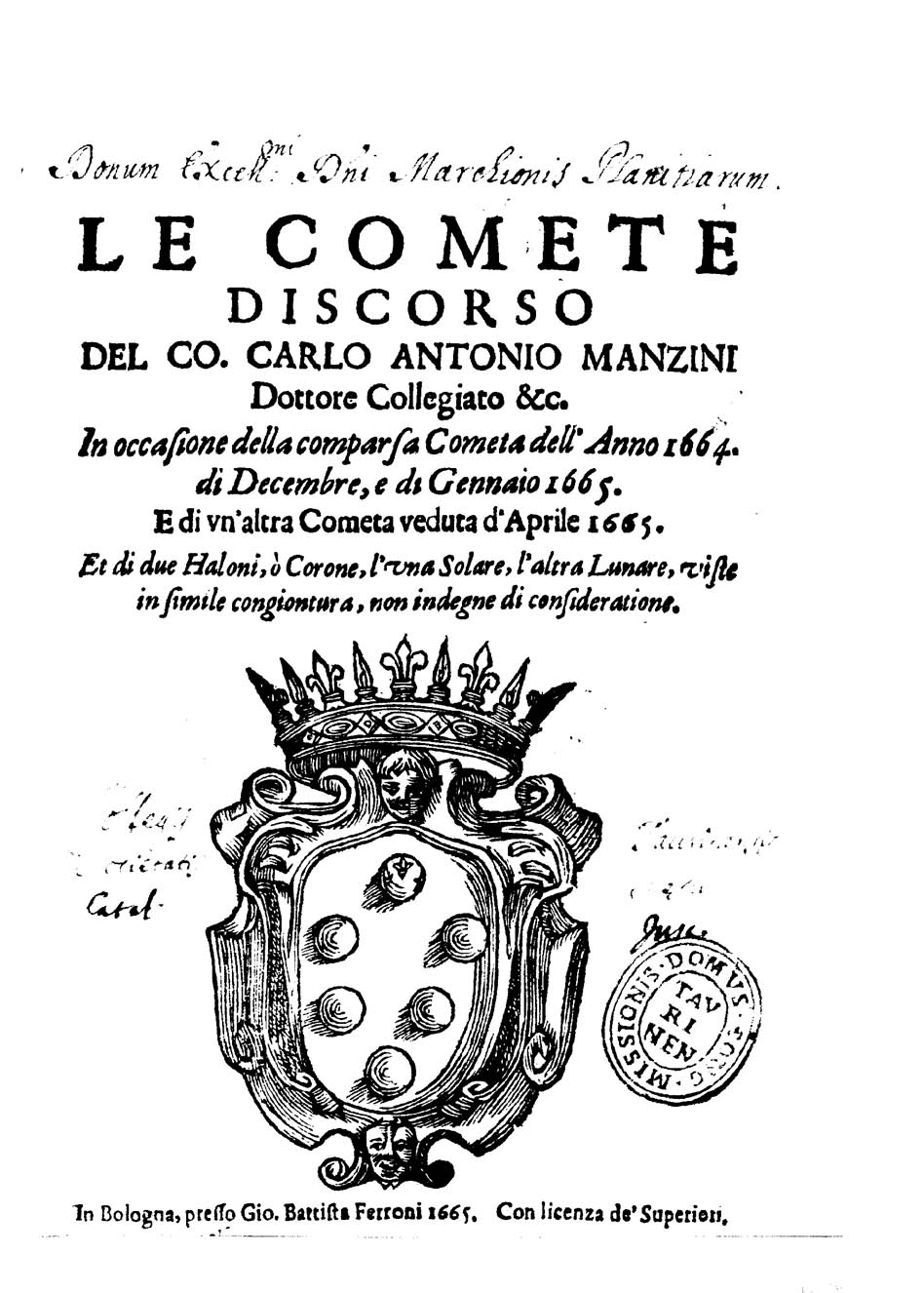
- Le comete ("The comets"), 1665
- Born: 5 October 1600; Bologna, Papal States
- Died: 1677 (aged 76–77); Bologna, Papal States
- Resting place: San Giacomo Maggiore, Bologna
- Education: University of Bologna
- Scientific career
- Fields: Mathematics; Optics; Astronomy
- Academic advisors: Giovanni Antonio Magini

Conte Carlo Antonio Manzini (5 October 1600 – 1677) was an Italian astronomer and mathematician. (His last name is sometimes given as Mangini or Mansini). Manzini was one of the best scholars of astronomy and optics of his time.

== Biography ==
A member of the Bolognese nobility, Manzini was a student of Giovanni Antonio Magini. He belonged to a group of Bolognese scientists who supported Galileo. In the first volume of his Almagestum novum (Bologna, 1651), Giovanni Battista Riccioli praised Manzini’s philosophical and scientific knowledge. He was in contact with many of the leading scientists of the time, including Mario Bettinus (with whom he performed some experiments), Ovidio Montalbani and Bonaventura Cavalieri (who was helped by Manzini to obtain the chair of mathematics at the University of Bologna).

Manzini was a member of the Accademia dei Gelati and one of the founders of the Accademia dei Vespertini, dedicated to the study of mathematics and experimental research. He published works on various phenomena, including comets, geodesy, and declination of the compass. In 1626 he published Tabulae primi mobilis: quibus nova dirigendi ars et praecipue circuli positionis inventio, non minus facilis quam exacta ostenditur. This volume presented tables for the construction of astrological charts.

His 1660 work, L'occhiale all'occhio, dioptrica practica, is one of the oldest accounts of the techniques for manufacturing lenses through grinding and polishing. Manzini was in close personal contact with the two principal makers of telescopes in Italy, Francesco Fontana and Eustachio Divini. A portrait of Divini is included in his book, which forms a complete practical manual for the artisan in the construction of both microscopes and telescopes.

From 1667 to 1670, Manzini lived in Florence. He took part in the cultural life of the city and became a prominent member of the Accademia degli Apatisti, founded in 1632 by the scholar Agostino Coltellini, a supporter of Galilean philosophy.

A skilled astronomer, Manzini made astronomical observations from his private observatory, which he maintained at his villa at Battedizzo near Bologna.

Manzini died in Bologna in 1677. He was buried in the Basilica of San Giacomo Maggiore. The crater Manzinus on the Moon is named after him.

== Works ==
- Tabulae primi mobilis, quibus nova dirigendi ars, et praecipue circuli positionis inventio non minus facilis, quam exacta ostenditur (in Latin). Bologna: Nicolò Tebaldini. 1626.
- Manzini, Carlo Antonio (1650). Della sicura incertezza nella declinatione dell'ago magnetico dal meridiano, del modo di terminar l'ombre gnomoniche con altre invenzioni utili (in Italian). Bologna: Evangelista Dozza (1.), eredi.
- Stella Gonzaga sive geographica ad terrarum orbis ambitum, et meridianorum differentias (in Latin). Bologna: Evangelista Dozza (1.), eredi. 1654.
- L'Occhiale all'occhio (in Italian). Bologna: eredi Vittorio Benacci. 1660.
- Le Comete (in Italian). Bologna: Giovanni Battista Ferroni. 1665.

== Bibliography ==
- Bellé, Riccardo (2009). "L'occhiale all'occhio. Un testo del XVII secolo sulla costruzione dei telescopi". Atti de la Fondazione Giorgio Ronchi. LXIV (3). Florence: 453–480.
- Matt, Luigi (2007). "MANZINI, Carlo Antonio". Dizionario Biografico degli Italiani (in Italian). Vol. 69: Mangiabotti–Marconi. Rome: Istituto dell'Enciclopedia Italiana. ISBN 978-88-12-00032-6.
- Anatrini, Leonardo (2024). "A Peculiar Case of Entrepreneurial Bravery. The First Edition of Galileo Galilei's Collected Works in the Context of Mid-Seventeenth-Century Publishing and Censorship". Publishers, Censors and Collectors in the European Book Trade, 1650-1750. Leiden-Boston: Brill: 71–105. ISBN 9789004691933.
