= Accademia degli Apatisti =

Italian academy founded in 1632

- Abbreviation: Gli Apatisti
- Formation: 1632
- Dissolved: 7 july 1783
- Purpose: Cultivation of Latin and Italian literature
- Headquarters: Florence, Grand Duchy of Tuscany
- Official language: Italian
- Remarks: Motto: Che la figura impressa non trasmuta ("The imprinted figure does not change")

The Accademia degli Apatisti was a scholarly society founded in Florence in 1632 and associated with the Studio Fiorentino. Together with the Accademia degli Umidi and the Accademia della Crusca it was one of Florence’s dominant literary academies of the XVII century.

== History ==
The Accademia degli Apatisti was founded by Agostino Coltellini and Benedetto Fioretti under the patronage of Cosimo III de' Medici. The academy had grown out of meetings held by Coltellini and his young companions in his lodgings in the Via dell'Oriuolo, during and immediately after the plague of 1630-1, for the purpose of mutual assistance and encouragement in their studies.

At first the Apatisti adopted the sun for their emblem and the motto Oltre i confini ancor del mondo nostro ('Beyond the confines of this world of ours'), a line by the Italian poet Torquato Tasso (Jerusalem Delivered, 14. 35). Their name derived from the Greek term ἀπάθεια, impassibility, describing the rational, emotionally detached attitude towards life upheld by the academy members. Meetings of the academy were held at Coltellini's house. In 1637, the academy was formally established and adopted a plane mirror as their emblem, and the motto Che la figura impressa non trasmuta ('The imprinted figure does not change'), a line from Dante's Divine Comedy (Purgatorio, 33.79).

One of the rules of the Apatisti (and there was a similar custom in most of the Italian academies) was that every member should, in his academic connexions, be known not by his own name but by some anagram or pseudonym. Coltellini adopted the anagrammatic name “Ostilio Contalgeni”.

Within ten or twenty years after its foundation, it became famed among Florentines, literati, cardinals, Italian princes and dukes, many foreign nobles and scholars, and at least one pope. When John Milton visited Florence in 1638–1639 he befriended many of the Apatisti, notably Benedetto Buommattei, Carlo Dati and Agostino Coltellini. He attended meetings of the academy and scholars suggest he likely applied for membership.

On 7 July 1783 the new Habsburg-Lorraine Grand Duke, Leopold II, abolished the Florentine Academy, the Accademia della Crusca and the Accademia degli Apatisti and established in their place an amalgam of the three, the Real Accademia Fiorentina.

== Notable members ==
- Alessandro Adimari
- Lodovico Adimari
- Giovanni Pietro Francesco Agius de Soldanis
- Ansaldo Ansaldi
- Angelico Aprosio
- Benedetto Averani
- Benedetto Buonmattei (Boemonte Battidente)
- Jean Chapelain
- Agostino Coltellini (Ostilio Contalgeni)
- Carlo Roberto Dati (Ardaclito)
- Ferdinando II de' Medici
- Stefano della Bella
- Mattia de Paoli
- Giovanni Battista Fagiuoli
- Benedetto Fioretti (Udeno Nisieli)
- Nicolaas Heinsius the Elder
- Giovanni Lami
- Lorenzo Lippi (Perlone Zipoli)
- Antonio Malatesti (Alamonio Transetti)
- Lorenzo Magalotti
- Domenico Maria Manni
- Carlo Antonio Manzini
- Alessandro Marchetti
- Gilles Ménage
- Francesco Redi
- Cristina Roccati
- Francesco Rondinelli
- Francesco Rovai (Rainero Fucasco)
- Anton Maria Salvini
- Salvino Salvini
- Giovanni Salvemini
- Carlo Antonio Stendardi
- Nicolas Steno
- Pietro Susini
- Anton Maria Vannucchi
- Vincenzo Viviani
- Stefano Zannowich

== Bibliography ==
- Benvenuti, Edoardo (1910). Agostino Coltellini e l'Accademia degli Apatisti. Pistoia: Officina tipografica cooperativa.
- Lazzeri, Alessandro (1983). Intellettuali e consenso nella Toscana del Seicento. L'accademia degli Apatisti. Milan: Giuffrè.
- Francesco Adorno, ed. (1988). Accademie e istituzioni culturali in Toscana. Florence: Leo S. Olschki.

== External Source ==
- Toscano, Anna. "I luoghi della Scienza in Toscana - L'Accademia degli Apatisti". Archived from the original on 3 October 2006.
