= Scaruffi =

Scaruffi is an Italian surname. Notable people with the surname include:

- Gasparo Scaruffi (1519–1584), Italian economist
- Piero Scaruffi (born 1955), Italian-American software consultant, university lecturer, and writer
