= Giulio Cesare Cortese =

Italian author and poet

Giulio Cesare Cortese (1570 in Naples, Kingdom of Naples – 22 December 1622 in Naples) was a writer and poet.

== Life ==
Born to a well-to-do family, nothing is known of Cortese's early life, though it is thought that he was a schoolmate of Giambattista Basile. Receiving a law degree, he tried life as a courtier in Spain and Florence, without any great success. Cortese apparently had some success in the Medici court as he was sent in 1599 to Spain as a member of a Medici delegation for the marriage of Philip III of Spain with Margherita of Austria. In his "Tuscan" rhymes, there is a fruitless attempt to catch the attention of the Counts of Lemos, the foremost representatives of the Spanish crown in Naples. He was a close friend of Luigi Caponaro, whom he frequently cites in his work. Regardless of his commemoration by Basile in 1627, it is generally believed, due to several handwritten manuscripts, that Cortese lived at least until 1640, and it is consequently believed that he attended and perhaps participated in his own funeral. Cortese is very important for Baroque and dialectical literature, in that, with Basile, he laid the foundations for the artistic and literary dignity of the Neapolitan language as opposed to the Tuscan dialect in which Cortese had also produced a number of largely laudatory works.

== Works ==
=== The Vaiasseide ===
A mock-heroic poem in five cantos, where the lyric meter and the heroic themes are lowered to the level of the protagonists: a group of vaiasse, common Neapolitan women who express themselves in dialect. Its writing is comic and transgressive, where much importance is given to the participation of the plebeian choir in the mechanics of the action.
The reader is literally catapulted into the day-to-day life of the vaiasse where the main element is the investigation of the world through which Cortese makes into a world which is not his own and which he describes with irony and tragedy.

=== The Voyage in Parnassus ===
This work, written in dialect, serves as a diagnostic exploration of the state of literature and the individuals involved in it, with a variety of autobiographical allusions, filled with bitterness and pessimism.
The entire narrative takes place in Parnassus where Apollo and his Muses reside and where the poet can set forth the sins of poetry, carried out in a degraded society, where the order of the day is the crime of plagiarism. The whole resolves itself with a fairytale ending and the bitter disillusionment of the poet who sees all of his ambitions coming to nought.
