= Mock-heroic =

Satiric parody of Classical heroic literature

Mock-heroic, mock-epic or heroi-comic works are typically satires or parodies that mock the elevated style of common classical stereotypes of heroes and heroic literature. Typically, mock-heroic works either put a fool in the role of the hero or exaggerate the heroic qualities in relation to a trivial subject.

== History ==
Historically, the mock-heroic style was popular in 17th-century Italy, and in the post-Restoration and Augustan periods in Great Britain.

The earliest example of the form is the Batrachomyomachia ascribed to Homer by the Romans and parodying his work, but believed by most modern scholars to be the work of an anonymous poet in the time of Alexander the Great.

Among the new genres, closer to the modern feelings and proposing new ideals, the satirical literature was particularly effective in criticizing the old habits and values. Beside the Spanish picaresque novels and the French burlesque novel, in Italy flourished the poema eroicomico. In this country those who still wrote epic poems, following the rules set by Torquato Tasso in his work Discorsi del poema eroico (Discussions about the Epic Poems) and realized in his masterwork, the Jerusalem Delivered, were felt as antiquated. The new mock-heroic poem accepted the same metre, vocabulary, rhetoric of the epics. However, the new genre turned the old epic upside down about the meaning, setting the stories in more familiar situations, to ridiculize the traditional epics. In this context was created the parody of epic genre.

Lo scherno degli dèi (The Mockery of Gods) by Francesco Bracciolini, printed in 1618 is often regarded as the first Italian poema eroicomico.

However, the best known of the form is La secchia rapita (The Stolen Bucket) by Alessandro Tassoni (1622).

Other Italian mock-heroic poems were La Gigantea by Girolamo Amelonghi (1566), La moscheide by Giovanni Battista Lalli (1624), the Viaggio di Colonia (Travel to Cologne) by Antonio Abbondanti (1625), L'asino (The donkey) by Carlo de' Dottori (1652), La Troja rapita by Loreto Vittori (1662), Il Malmantile racquistato by Lorenzo Lippi (1688), La presa di San Miniato by Ippolito Neri (1764).

Also in Italian dialects were written mock-heroic poems. For example, in Neapolitan dialect the best known work of the form was La Vaiasseide by Giulio Cesare Cortese (1612). While in Romanesco Giovanni Camillo Peresio wrote Il maggio romanesco (1688), Giuseppe Berneri published Meo Patacca in 1695, and, finally, Benedetto Micheli printed La libbertà romana acquistata e defesa in 1765.

After the translation of Don Quixote, by Miguel de Cervantes, English authors began to imitate the inflated language of Romance poetry and narrative to describe misguided or common characters. The most likely genesis for the mock-heroic, as distinct from the picaresque, burlesque, and satirical poem is the comic poem Hudibras (1662–1674), by Samuel Butler. Butler's poem describes a "trew blew" Puritan knight during the Interregnum, in language that imitates Romance and epic poetry. After Butler, there was an explosion of poetry that described a despised subject in the elevated language of heroic poetry and plays. Hudibras gave rise to a particular verse form, commonly called the "Hudibrastic".

Poet Laureate John Dryden is responsible for some of the dominance among satirical genres of the mock-heroic in the later Restoration era. While Dryden's own plays would themselves furnish later mock-heroics (specifically, The Conquest of Granada is satirized in the mock-heroic The Author's Farce and Tom Thumb by Henry Fielding, as well as The Rehearsal), Dryden's Mac Flecknoe is perhaps the locus classicus of the mock-heroic form as it would be practiced for a century to come. In that poem, Dryden indirectly compares Thomas Shadwell with Aeneas by using the language of Aeneid to describe the coronation of Shadwell on the throne of Dullness formerly held by King Flecknoe. The parody of Virgil satirizes Shadwell. Dryden's prosody is identical to regular heroic verse: iambic pentameter closed couplets. The parody is not formal, but merely contextual and ironic. (For an excellent overview of the history of the mock-heroic in the 17th and 18th centuries see "the English Mock-Heroic poem of the 18th Century" by Grazyna Bystydzienska, published by Polish Scientific Publishers, 1982.)

After Dryden, the form continued to flourish, and there are countless minor mock-heroic poems from 1680 to 1780. Additionally, there were a few attempts at a mock-heroic novel. The most significant later mock-heroic poems were by Alexander Pope. Pope's The Rape of the Lock is a noted example of the Mock-Heroic style; indeed, Pope never deviates from mimicking epic poetry such as Homer's Iliad and Virgil's Aeneid. The overall form of the poem, written in cantos, follows the tradition of epics, along with the precursory “Invocation of the Muse”; in this case, Pope's Muse is literally the person who prodded him to write the poem, John Caryll: “this verse to Caryll, Muse, is due!” (line 3). Epics always include foreshadowing which is usually given by an otherworldly figure, and Pope mocks tradition through Ariel the sprite, who sees some “dread event” (line 109) impending on Belinda. These epic introductory tendencies give way to the main portion of the story, usually involving a battle of some kind (such as in the Iliad) that follows this pattern: dressing for battle (description of Achilles shield, preparation for battle), altar sacrifice/libation to the gods, some battle change (perhaps involving drugs), treachery (Achilles ankle is told to be his weak spot), a journey to the Underworld, and the final battle. All of these elements are followed eloquently by Pope in that specific order: Belinda readies herself for the card game (which includes a description of her hair and beauty), the Baron makes a sacrifice for her hair (the altar built for love and the deal with Clarissa), the “mock” battle of cards changes in the Baron’s favor, Clarissa’s treachery to her supposed friend Belinda by slipping the Baron scissors, and finally the treatment of the card game as a battle and the Baron’s victory. Pope’s mastery of the Mock-Heroic is clear in every instance. Even the typical apotheosis found in the epics is mimicked in The Rape of the Lock, as “the stars inscribe Belinda’s name!” (line 150). He invokes the same Mock-heroic style in The Dunciad which also employs the language of heroic poetry to describe menial or trivial subjects. In this mock-epic the progress of Dulness over the face of the earth, the coming of stupidity and tastelessness, is treated in the same way as the coming of civilization is in the Aeneid (see also the metaphor of translatio studii). John Gay's Trivia and Beggar's Opera were mock-heroic (the latter in opera), and Samuel Johnson's London is a mock-heroic of a sort.

== See also ==
- Travesty (literature)
