= Anton Maria Vannucchi =

Italian Italian jurist and writer (1724–1792)

Anton Maria Vannucchi (2 February 1724 – 12 February 1792) was an Italian professor of law and erudite writer, including poetry.

== Early life and education ==
He was born in Castelfiorentino to an old Florentine family. He was related to the painter Andrea del Sarto.

He studied literature in the Collegio delle Scuole Pie in Florence, learning Greek under the erudite Giovanni Lami. He studied law under Anton Bernardo Ceccarelli. He ultimately obtained his doctorate from the University of Pisa.

== Career ==
He taught initially in San Miniato, then moved to Florence. He was a member of the Accademia degli Apatisti and published in Lami's Novelle Litterarie. He was inducted in the Accademia della Crusca.

In 1750, he was appointed professor of medieval law at the University of Pisa, and continued to teach there, with many pauses until 1792. He exchanged correspondence with many of the European intelligentsia of the Italian Enlightenment, including Voltaire, Ludovico Antonio Muratori, Metastasio, and Vittorio Alfieri.

== Works ==
Among his writings are:

- Raccolta d'opuscoli sopra l'opinioni filosofiche di Newton edited by Lorenzo Tosi and Vannucchi, Florence, 1744.
- Dissertazione del metodo di acquistare la Giurisprudenza critica, Florence 1750.
- Dissertazioni filosofiche ad uso degli studiosi del Gius pubblico, Pisa 1760.
- Posie intitolate il Trionfo di Minerva, libri tre Livorno 1768.
- Poesie, Livorno 1756 in two volumes.
- Osservazioni sopra gli Arimanni dei bassi secoli (see Arimannus).

== Bibliography ==
- Labardi, Andrea (2020). "Vannucchi, Anton Maria". Dizionario Biografico degli Italiani (in Italian). Vol. 98: Valeriani–Verra. Rome: Istituto dell'Enciclopedia Italiana. ISBN 978-88-12-00032-6.
