= Lorenzo Lippi =

Italian painter (1606–1665)

- Lorenzo Lippi. Engraving by Francesco Zuccarelli after a contemporary portrait by Lippi's friend and biographer Filippo Baldinucci
- Born: 3 May 1606; Florence, Grand Duchy of Tuscany
- Died: 15 April 1665 (aged 58); Florence, Grand Duchy of Tuscany
- Education: Matteo Rosselli
- Occupations: Painter, writer
- Movement: Baroque
- Relatives: Giovanni Francesco Susini father-in-law

Lorenzo Lippi (3 May 1606 – 15 April 1665) was an Italian Baroque painter and poet from Florence.

== Biography ==
=== Early life and education ===
Lorenzo Lippi was born in Florence on 3 May 1606 to Giovanni di Lorenzo and Maria Bartolini. He studied painting under Matteo Rosselli, with whom he collaborated closely for many years. The partnership between the two painters is first documented in 1622, when the young Lippi assisted Rosselli with the fresco decorations on the ceiling of the Sala della Stufa at the Palazzo Pitti in Florence.

In Rosselli's workshop, Lippi befriended Baldassare Franceschini and Francesco Furini, whose elegant, naturalistic style had a profound impact on his work. Realism will remain a dominant trait of Lippi's artistic output. In his biography of the artist, his friend Filippo Baldinucci stated that Lippi's art was informed by the simple imitation of nature (la semplice imitazione del naturale) rather than more prominent artistic models, such as Antonio da Correggio.

After losing his father in 1614, aged ten, he became involved in the religious life of Counter-Reformation Florence. Records from the Compagnia dell'Arcangelo Raffaele reveal that he played a significant role within the confraternity. Between 1616 and 1657, he held numerous positions: he served twice as governor and councilor, five times as choir director (ordinatore di coro), and no fewer than eight times as master of ceremonies.

=== Early work ===
Until the years around 1630, Lippi's style is close to Rosselli's, decorative and theatrical, and is based on biblical and literary subjects. Around 1626, he created his first independent work, the Apostles James, John and Matthew, and Christ Blessing, commissioned by the Compagnia della Madonna della Neve in Vaglia. Other works from this period include: St. Catherine of Alexandria (1629; Dicomano, Pieve di Santa Maria); the Virgin Handing the Child to St Francis (c. 1630; Florence, Bardini Museum); and two lunettes for the Bonsi chapel in the church of San Gaetano, Florence, depicting St. Francis Adoring the Child in the Manger and St. Christina Attended by Angels in Prison (1632, in situ). While still deeply influencefd by Rosselli, these early works already display the defining features of Lippi's style, particularly the clear, graphic depiction of figures and the luminous highlighting of the contours of objects.

Samson and Delilah (1632–1634), oil on canvas, 197.5 x 135 cm, Stockholm, Nationalmuseum

In 1630 Lippi was admitted to the Accademia delle Arti del Disegno and achieved his first notable public success for the Medici court, with the Sermon of Jesus. Between 1629 and 1634, he created a series of decorative and theatrical compositions, primarily based on biblical and literary themes, intended for meeting rooms in religious guilds or private palace galleries. Works belonging to this phase of his career include St. Philip Baptizing the Eunuch (priv. coll.) and the Baptism of Saint Paul (London, Colnaghi), executed in 1632 for the Compagnia di San Paolo di Notte. These works remain indebted to Rosselli and exhibit some awkwardness in terms of perspective and draftsmanship. Nevertheless, they successfully fulfil a narrative function through the gestures and expressions of the protagonists, which betray the influence of Vignali's intensely emotive style.

Also from this period is a series of canvases dating to around 1632–1634, for which there are a few reliable documentary sources: the Feast of Herod (Florence, Museo del Cenacolo di Andrea del Sarto); Samson and Delilah (Stockholm, Nationalmuseum); Ruth and Boaz (Florence, Palatine Gallery, Palazzo Pitti); Tamar Returning the Pledges to Judah (Rome, Palazzo Montecitorio); Angelica and Medoro (Dublin, National Gallery of Ireland); and the Three Brothers Led to the Fiery Furnace (Florence, Palatine Gallery, Palazzo Pitti). Rich in theatrical elements, from the figures' gestures and the overall composition to their elaborate attire, these paintings showcase a lavish, flourishing style that was highly prized by patrons. These works were perhaps still executed in the Rosselli’s workshop. Lippi parted ways with his master around 1634, when he opened his own studio. In 1633, Lippi became a member of the Accademia degli Apatisti, where he befriended prominent Florentine poets and intellectuals, such as Agostino Coltellini, Carlo Roberto Dati, and Antonio Malatesti.

=== Mature works ===
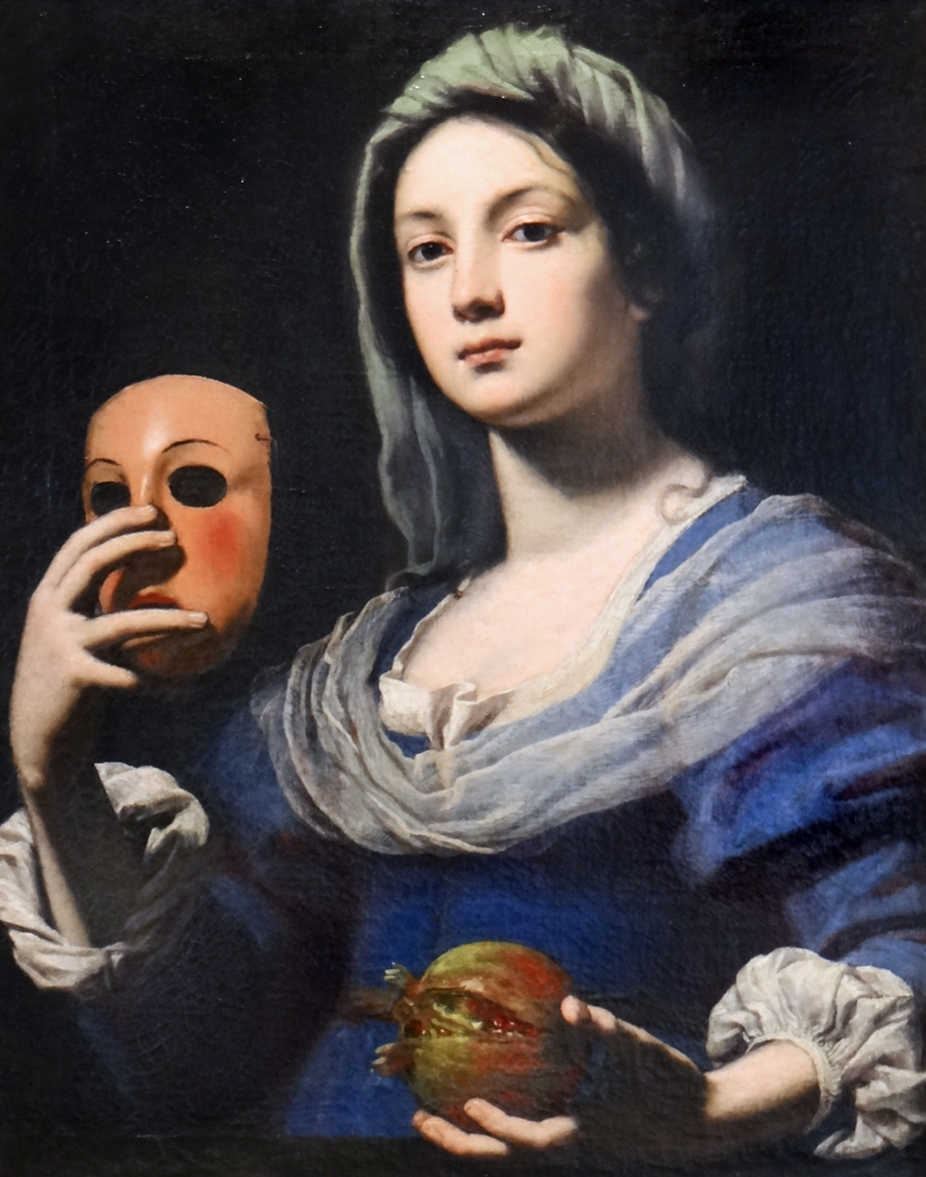
Allegory of Simulation (c. 1640), oil on canvas, 73 × 89 cm, Musée des Beaux-Arts d'Angers

Between 1639 and 1640, Lippi received his first major ecclesiastical commissions: the Martyrdom of St Andrew, painted in 1639 for the Church of San Frediano (now lorence ,Sant'Agata); and the fresco Sts. Agatha, Catherine and Cecilia on the ceiling of the Oratorio dei Vanchetoni in Florence, painted between 1639 and 1640. To the same period date the Allegory of Innocence (Oxford, Ashmolean Museum), the Muse Euterpe (priv. coll.), the Allegory of Human Folly (Belfast, Ulster Museum) and the Allegory of Music (New York, Baroni collection). The Allegory of Simulation (Angers, Musée des Beaux-Arts), the Flight into Egypt (1642, Sant'Agostino, Massa Marittima), and the Martyrdom of St. James (1642, Santa Maria del Carmine, Florence) mark a definitive shift from Rosselli's decorative style towards a highly personal, purist language based on the work of the late sixteenth-century painter, Santi di Tito, and of the great Florentine High Renaissance artists, Andrea del Sarto and Fra Bartolomeo. With this change, as Filippo Baldinucci noted, Lippi at mid-century was thought to be one of the best artists active in Florence. His work, based on the Old Testament and courtly poetry, was the result of both public and private commissions and includes designing cartoons for the Medici tapestry works (1641–1657), the Angelic Concert (1643–1644) in San Gaetano, Florence at Florence and the Jacob at the Well in the Palatine Gallery.

In the 1640s, Lippi became close friends with the Neapolitan painter Salvator Rosa, who lived in Florence from 1640 to 1649. Together, they founded the Accademia dei Percossi (Academy of the Beaten), a salon of poets, playwrights and painters which enjoyed a brief but turbolent life. Rosa introduced Lippi to Giambattista Basile's collection of fairy tales, the Pentamerone, a work that would become a major source of inspiration for Lippi's poetry.

In 1643, Lippi was summoned to the Court of Tyrol by the Archduchess Claudia de' Medici, widow of Archduke Leopold V and daughter of Ferdinando I de' Medici. During his time at the Innsbruck court, from October 1643 to April 1644, he produced numerous portraits of members of the Habsburg family, including Claudia de' Medici in a widow's attire, Claudia as St. Christina, and portraits of Maria Leopoldine, Isabella Clara, and Sigismund Francis. These works are now housed in the Kunsthistorisches Museum in Vienna, alongside one of Lippi's most celebrated pieces, the classicising Samaritan at the Well, completed in 1644.

In Innsbruck, Lippi wrote his mosck-heroic poem Il Malmantile racquistato, which was published posthumously under the anagrammatic pseudonym of Perlone Zipoli in 1676. Il Malmantile racquistato is a take-off on Tasso's Jerusalem Delivered, combined with material taken from Tuscan folklore; its principal subject matter is an expedition for the recovery of a fortress and territory whose queen had been expelled by a female usurper. It is full of Florentine proverbs, sayings and popular language, and is counted by the Accademia della Crusca as a testo di lingua.

Lippi returned to Florence in 1644. In 1646, at the age of 40, he married Giovanni Francesco Susini's daughter Elisabetta. His paintings from the late 1640s to the early 1650s, for example, the Crucifixion, (1647; Florence; Museo Nazionale di San Marco), are characteized by a combination of strong light and dark shadows, the use of primary colours, and a crisp rendition of figures and objects. Lippi completed his final work, the Trinity, for the church of Vallombrosa Abbey in 1665. He died of pleurisy in Florence on 15 April 1665 and was buried the following day in the Bartolini Chapel in the cemetery of Santa Maria Novella. Lippi was renowned for the extreme clarity and purity of his style. The most esteemed of his works are a Crucifixion in the Uffizi gallery at Florence, and a Triumph of David which he executed for the salon of Angiolo Galli, introducing into it portraits of the seventeen children of the owner. The most prominent of his pupils was Bartolomeo Bimbi, whose naturalistic still lifes are deeply indebted to his master's painting style.

== Works (Selection) ==
Allegory of Innocence (1639–1642), oil on canvas, 99 x 84 cm, Oxford, Ashmolean Museum

- Samson and Delilah (1632–1634), Stockholm, Nationalmuseum;
- Three Brothers Led to the Fiery Furnace (1632–1634), Florence, Palatine Gallery, Palazzo Pitti;
- Angelica and Medoro (1632–1634), Dublin, National Gallery of Ireland;
- Saint Agatha (1638–1644), Blanton Museum of Art;
- Judith With the Head of Holofernes (1639–1642), Musée des Beaux-Arts de Narbonne;
- Allegory of Innocence (1639–1642), Oxford, Ashmolean Museum;
- Allegory of Simulation (c. 1640), Musée des Beaux-Arts d'Angers;
- Allegory of Music (c. 1640), New York, Baroni collection;
- Allegory of Fortune (c. 1640), Ulster Museum, Belfast;
- Angelic Concert (1643–1644), San Gaetano, Florence;
- The Samaritan at the Well (1644), Vienna, Kunsthistorisches Museum;
- Crucifixion (1647), Florence, Museo Nazionale di San Marco;
- Tobias and Archangel Raphael, National Museum in Wrocław;
- The Triumph of David (1650-1655), Palatine Gallery, Pitti Palace, Florence;
- Lot and His Daughters (1660s), Uffizi Gallery, Florence;
- Saint Francis of Assisi in Prayer (1660s ), Louvre, Paris.
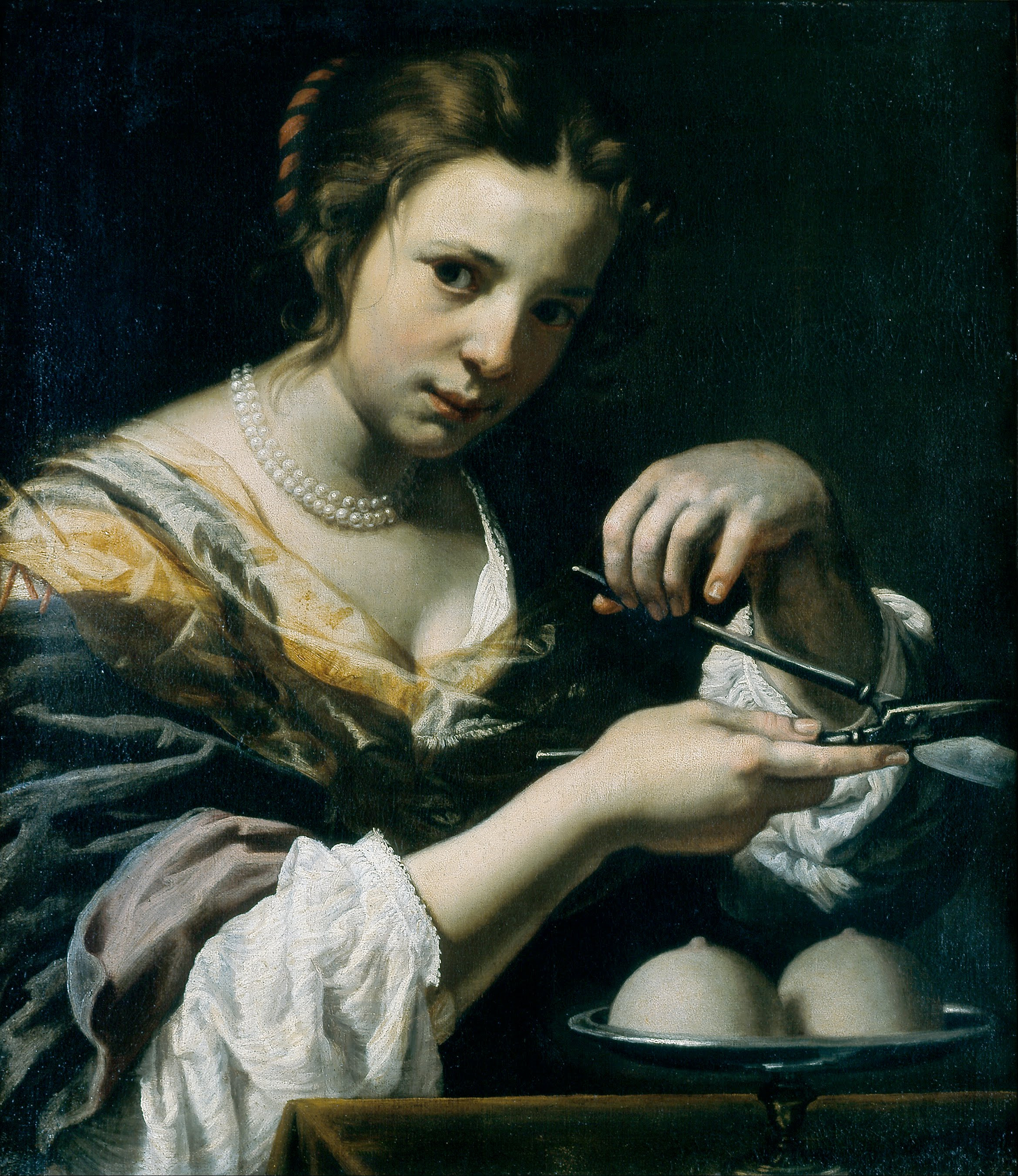
Saint Agatha (1638–1644), oil on canvas, 75.7 x 64.1 cm, Blanton Museum of Art

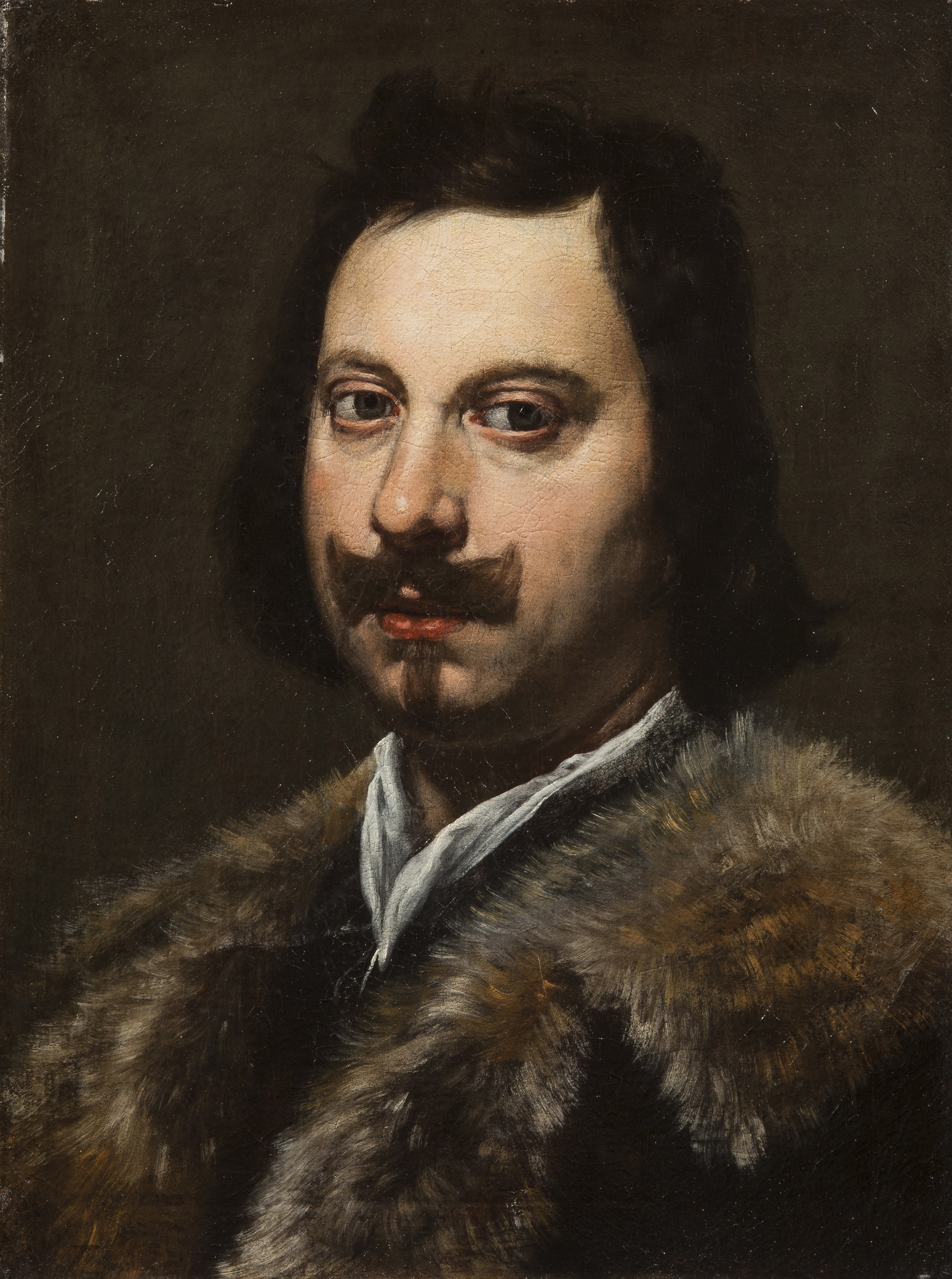
Portrait of Evangelista Torricelli (c. 1647), oil on canvas, 47.7 x 36 cm, London, priv. col.

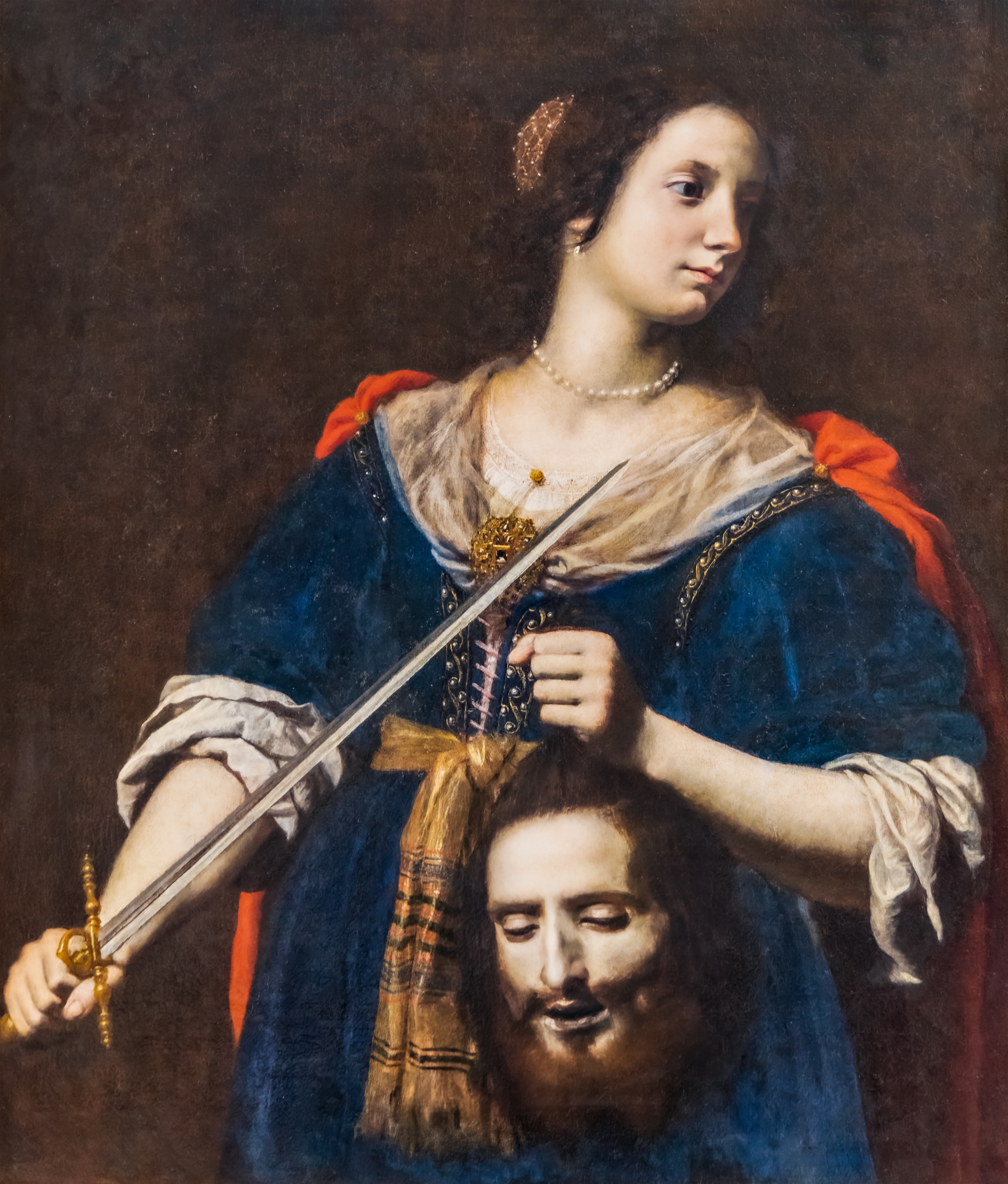
Judith With the Head of Holofernes (1639–1642), oil on canvas, 99 x 84 cm, Musée des Beaux-Arts de Narbonne

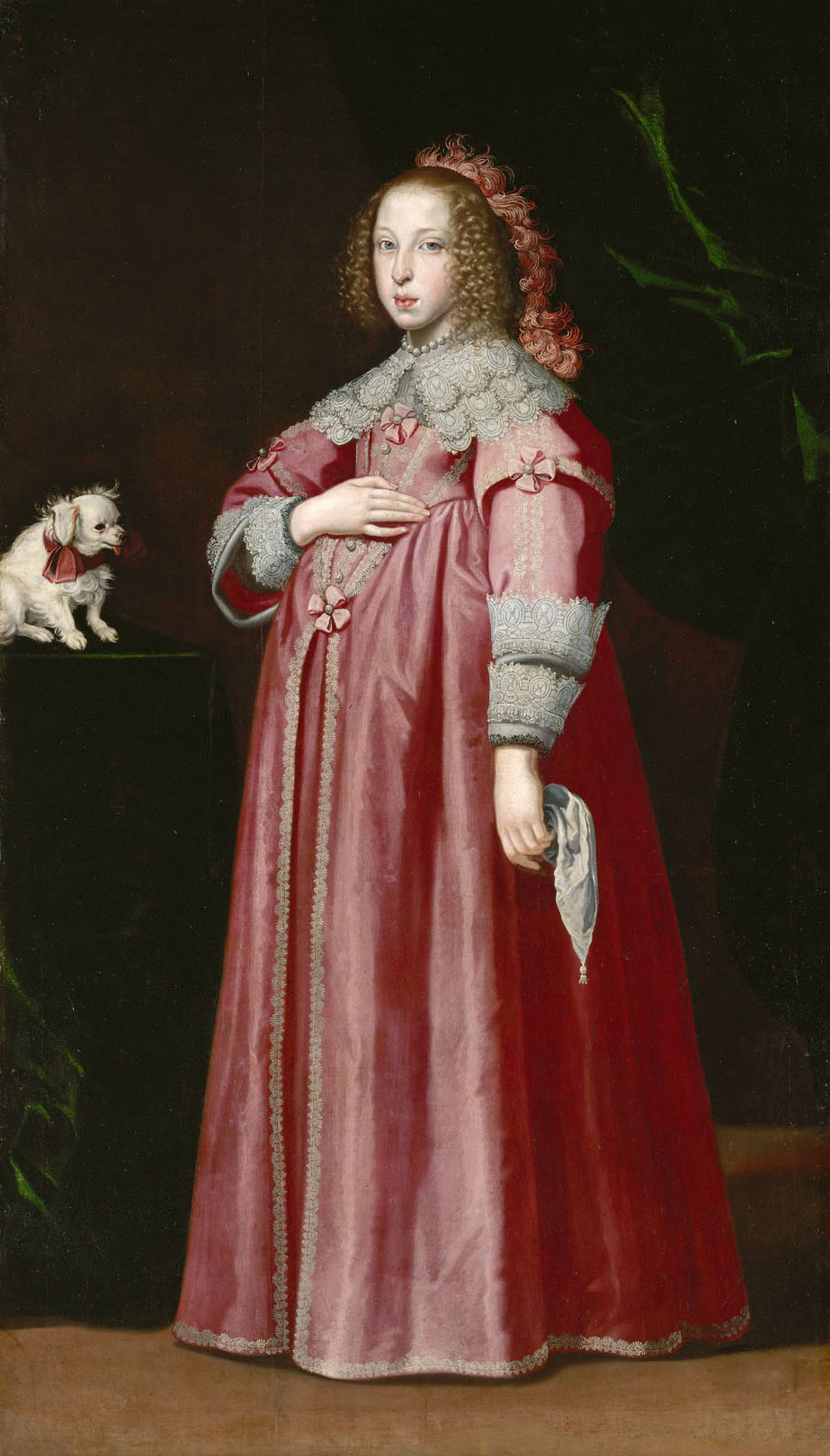
Portrait of Maria Leopoldine of Austria (1649), oil on canvas, 200 x 110 cm, Vienna, Kunsthistorisches Museum,

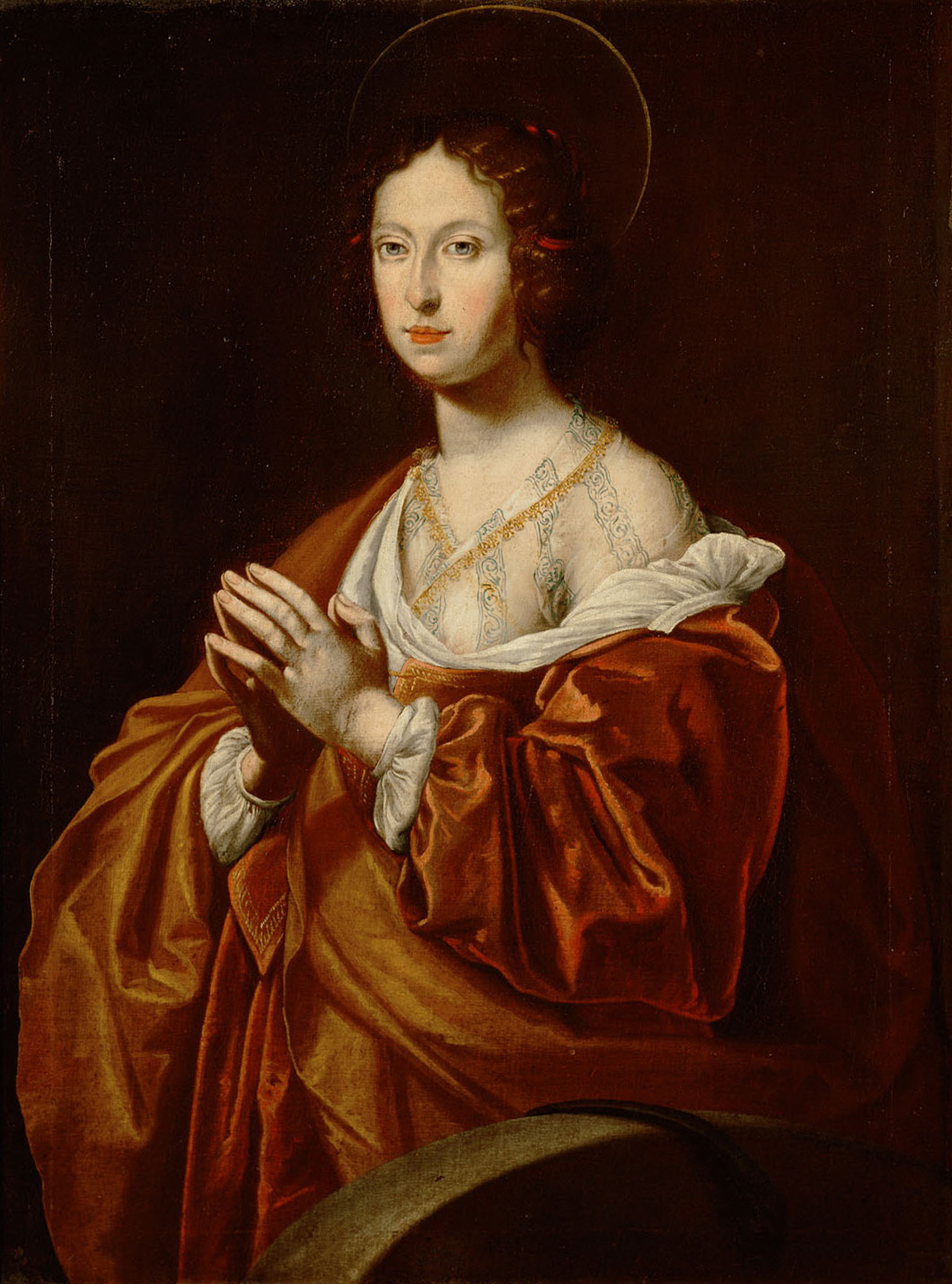
Portrait of Claudia de' Medici, (c. 1644), oil on canvas, 100 x 70 cm, Vienna, Kunsthistorisches Museum

The Samaritan at the Well (1644), oil on canvas, 185 x 175 cm, Vienna, Kunsthistorisches Museum

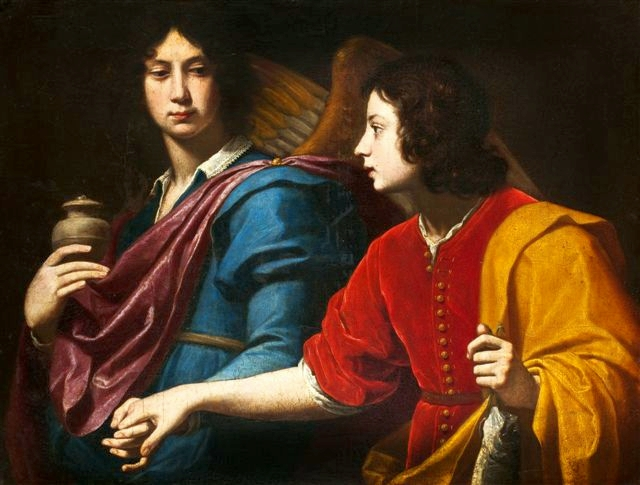
Tobias and Archangel Raphael (c. 1640-1650), oil on canvas, 80.3 x 106 cm, National Museum in Wrocław

Allegory of Fortune (c. 1640), oil on canvas, 76.2 x 63.2 cm, Belfast, Ulster Museum

== Bibliography ==
- Baldinucci, Filippo (1847). Notizie dei professori del disegno. Vol. V. Florence: V. Batelli & co. pp. 261–278, 451, 458–460.
- D’Afflitto, Chiara (2003). "Lippi, Lorenzo". Grove Art Online. Oxford: Oxford University Press. doi:10.1093/gao/9781884446054.article.T051288.
- D'Afflitto, Chiara; Carminati, Clizia (2005). "LIPPI, Lorenzo". Dizionario Biografico degli Italiani (in Italian). Vol. 65: Levis–Lorenzetti. Rome: Institute of the Italian Encyclopaedia. ISBN 978-88-12-00032-6.
- Struhal, Eva (2015). "A painting of 'St John the Evangelist' by Lorenzo Lippi in the former Collection du Séminaire, Quebec City". The Burlington Magazine. 157 (1349): 535–538. JSTOR 43858122.
