= Filippo Sassetti =

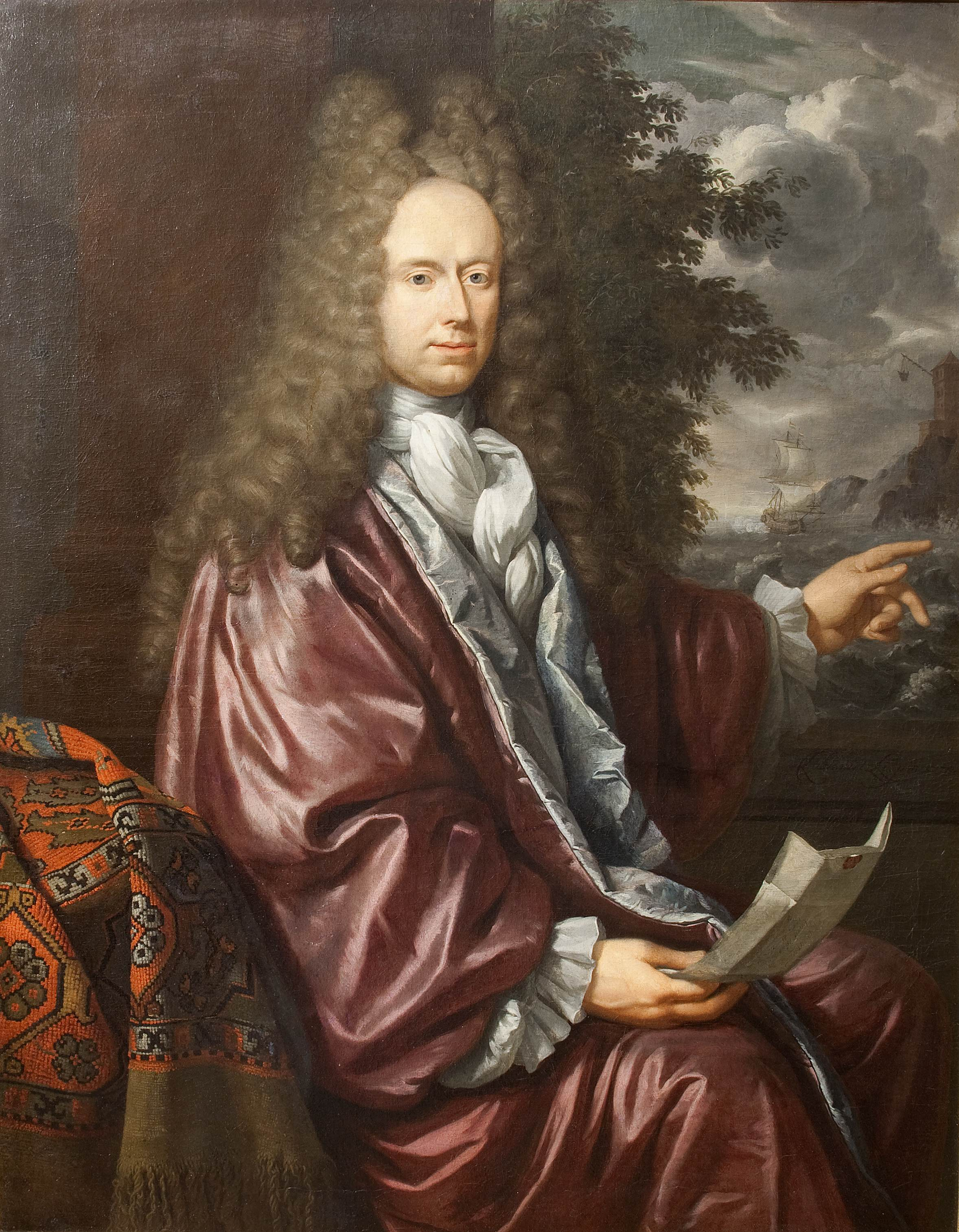
- posthumous portrait by Christoffel Lubienietzky
- Born: 1540; Florence, Italy
- Died: 1588 (aged 47–48); Goa, India
- Occupations: Traveller, merchant and linguist

Filippo Sassetti (1540–1588) was a traveller and merchant from a long-established Florentine mercantile family, who was born in Florence in 1540. Though his father had sold family interests and he had to commence as a clerk in a merchant business, Sassetti enrolled in 1568 at the University of Pisa and was imbued with a humanist education; he was proficient in botany, geography, astronomy and cosmography and was curious about philology and the classical languages.

Settling in Lisbon in 1578-82, he travelled to the Indian subcontinent, reaching Cochin in November 1583, and remained in Cochin and Goa and the Malabar coast that joins the two, until his death. He is known to posterity from the thirty-two detailed letters he sent home to members of the Florentine patriciate and the Grand Duke of Tuscany; they were not published until centuries after his death. Sassetti, an attentive observer of people and customs, was among the first European observers to study the ancient Indian language, Sanskrit. Writing privately to fellow Florentine Bernardo Davanzati in 1585, he noted some word similarities between Sanskrit and Italian (e.g. deva/dio 'God', sarpa/serpe 'snake', sapta/sette 'seven', ashta/otto 'eight', nava/nove 'nine'). This unpublished observation is today credited to have foreshadowed the later discovery of the Indo-European language family. Sassetti died in 1588 at what was then Portuguese Goa.

== Bibliography ==
- Marcucci, E. M. 1855. Lettere edite e inedite di Pilippo Sassetti raccolte e annotate. Firenze.
- Muller, Jean-Claude. 1986. Early stages of language comparison from Sassetti to Sir William Jones (1786). Kratylos 31.1-31.
