= Alessandro Adimari =

Italian poet and classical scholar

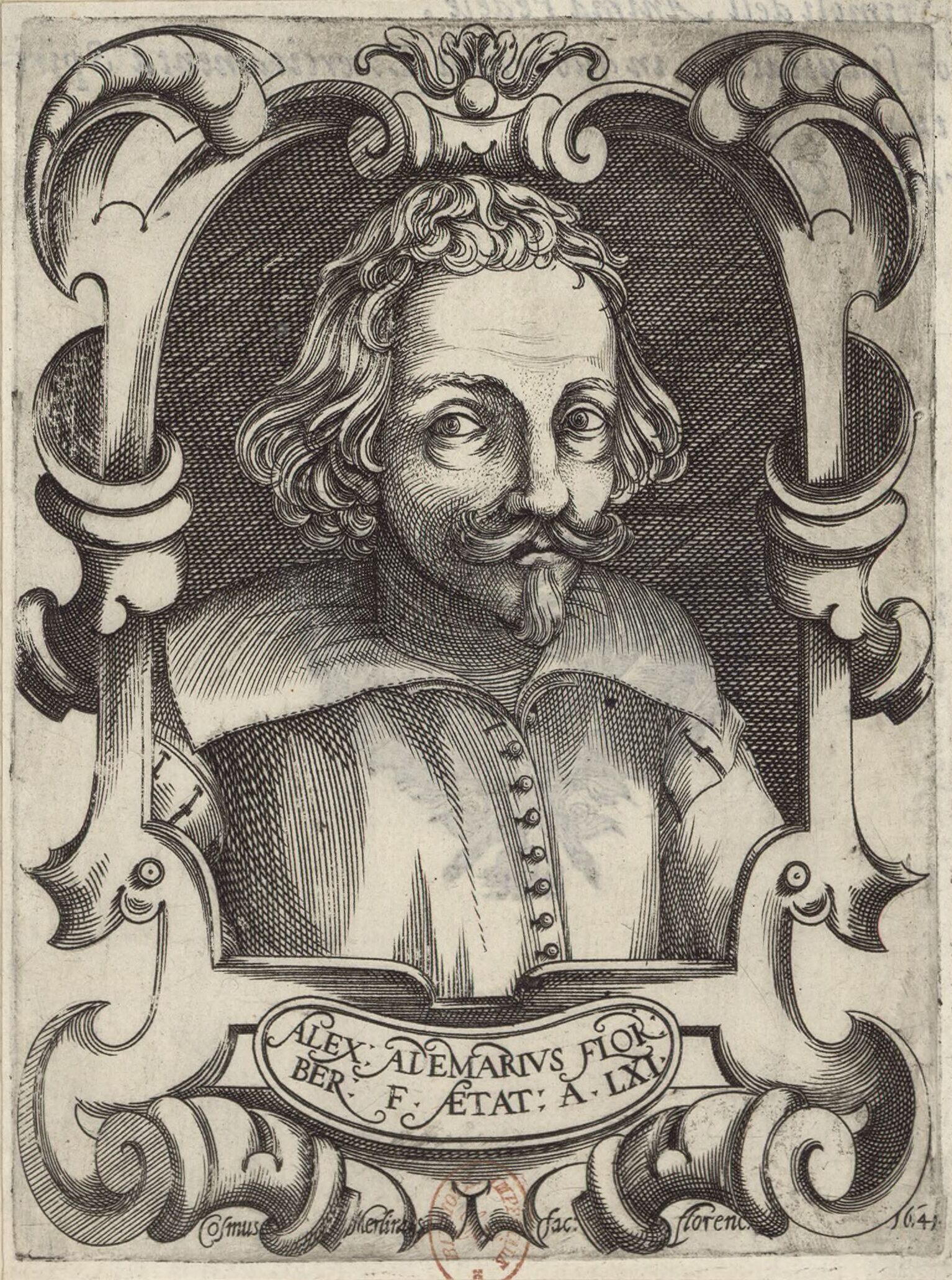
- Alessandro Adimari
- Born: 1579; Florence, Grand Duchy of Tuscany
- Died: 1649 (aged 69–70); Florence, Grand Duchy of Tuscany
- Occupations: Poet; Classical scholar; Translator
- Known for: Italian translation of Pindar
- Father: Bernardo di Tommaso Adimari
- Writing career
- Language: Latin, Italian
- Genres: Poetry; translation
- Literary movement: Baroque

Alessandro Adimari (Italian: [ale's:andro adiˈma:ri]; 1579 – 1649) was an Italian Baroque poet and classical scholar. In his verse he practised both concettismo and the Pindaric mode, as he theorized in his Lettera sopra la poesia ditirambica (1629).

== Biography ==
Alessandro Adimari was born of a noble Florentine family in 1579. He held minor government offices and was a member of the Accademia degli Alterati, the Accademia degli Incogniti and the Accademia dei Lincei. In 1633 he was appointed secretary of the Accademia Fiorentina.

In 1631 he published a free translation of Pindar in Italian verse, with notes and illustrations, Le Odi di Pindaro tradotte in parafrasi e in rima Toscana e dichiarate con osservazione e confronti di alcuni luoghi imitati e tocchi da Orazio. Adimari, who dedicated his work to Cardinal Francesco Barberini, says that he spent sixteen years about it. He inserted synoptical sketches for the purpose of explaining the plan and order of the Greek poet in his odes. Pierre-Louis Ginguené, in the Biographie Universelle, art. Adimari, falsely charges him with having borrowed them from Erasmus Schmidt's Latin version of Pindar, published 1616.

Adimari wrote also a kind of bibliography of poets La Mono-Grecia ove sono raccolti i nomi di tutti i Poeti dal principio della Poesia del Mondo sino al principio della Poesia Toscana; Esequie di don Francesco de Medici (1614); and other minor works. He also wrote a religious drama, L'adorazione de' Magi (1642).

Between 1637 and 1640 he published six collections of fifty sonnets each, under the names of six of the muses: “Terpsichore”, “Clio”, “Melpomene”, “Calliope”, “Urania”, and “Polyhymnia”. Particularly notable is the poetry collection “Terpsichore” (1637), composed of fifty-three highly manneristic sonnets. The sonnets are parodies of Petrarchan flattery, purporting to celebrate beauty in women who are too young or too old to be loved or who are ill or deformed. Following Seneca, Adimari claims that his verses might help husbands to accept the imperfections of their wives; he reminds his reader that just as there is no beauty without a flaw, so there is no flaw that does not also encompass beauty. The sonnets are masterfully witty rhetorical celebrations of such fancied paramours, sometimes savagely ridiculed by Adimari, who shows himself a master of the sonnet and highly attuned to the principal poetic tendencies of late Renaissance culture. Aßmann's translation of Adimari's “Terpsichore” appeared in the 1704 collection as “Schertz-Sonnette oder Kling-Gedichte über die auch bey ihren Mängeln vollkommene und Lieb-würdige Schönheit des Frauenzimmers” (Playful Sonnets or Songs on the Perfect and Amiable Beauty of Women Even If Flawed). Adimari died in 1649.

== Works ==
- Alessandro, Adimari (1631). Ode Di Pindaro Antichissimo Poeta: Cioè, Olimpie & Pithie & Nemee & Istmie Tradotte in Parafrasi, & in Rima Toscana Da Alessandro Adimari, e dichiarate dal medesimo. Con osseruazioni, e confronti d'alcuni luoghi immitati, ò tocchi Da Orazio Flacco (in Italian). Pisa: nella stamperia di Francesco Tanagli.

== Bibliography ==
- «Alessandro Adimari Fiorentino». In : Le glorie de gli Incogniti: o vero, Gli huomini illustri dell'Accademia de' signori Incogniti di Venetia, In Venetia : appresso Francesco Valuasense stampator dell'Accademia, 1647, pp. 14–17 (on-line).
- The Biographical Dictionary of the Society for the Diffusion of Useful Knowledge. Vol. 1. Longman, Brown, Green, and Longmans. 1843. pp. 349–350.
- Sandys, John Edwin (1908). A History of Classical Scholarship. Vol. 2. Cambridge University Press. p. 282.
- Gabrieli, Giuseppe (1940). "Di Alessandro Adimari Linceo". Archivio Storico Italiano (in Italian). 98 (1): 84–89. JSTOR 26242707.
- D'Addario, Arnaldo (1960). "ADIMARI, Alessandro". Dizionario Biografico degli Italiani (in Italian). Vol. 1: Aaron–Albertucci. Rome: Istituto dell'Enciclopedia Italiana. OCLC 883370.
- Slawinski, M. (2002). "Adimari, Alessandro". The Oxford Companion to Italian Literature. Oxford University Press.
