= Francesco Fontani =

Florentine scholar, priest, historian, and librarian

Francesco Fontani (23 May 1748 – 4 December 1818) was a Florentine scholar, priest, historian, and librarian for the Biblioteca Riccardiana.

He was born in Florence, and studied first in the Seminary of the Collegio Eugeniano, then went on to teach rhetoric in the Collegio Bandinelli of Rome. He was known for his knowledge about ancient artifacts. In 1783, returning to Florence, he was appointed to the position previously held by Giovanni Lami, as librarian at Riccardiana, but also working for the Accademia della Crusca, and serving as parish priest for the church of Santa Lucia dei Magnoli. He appears to have been demoted for participating with revolutionary French forces during the Napoleonic occupation.

He helped publish Il viaggio pittorico della Toscana, a travel journey through Tuscany known for its vedute of the skylines of numerous towns at the start of the 19th century. The book was published between 1801 and 1803 by Tipi del Tofani and engraved by the brothers Terreni. Reprinted after 1817 by Giovanni Marenigh.
