= Giovanni Battista Fagiuoli =

Italian writer, poet and playwright (1660–1742)

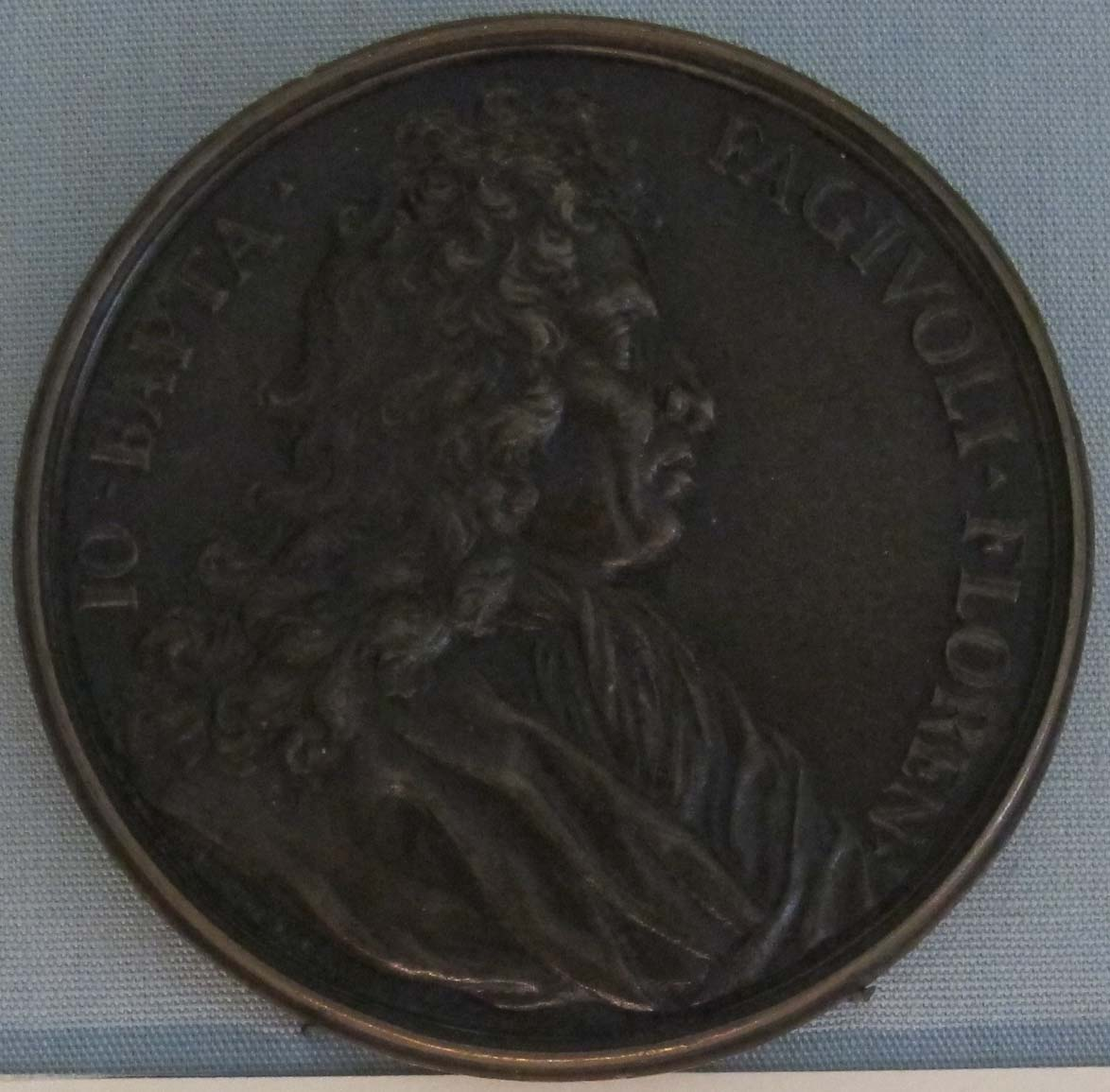
Medallion with profile bust of Giovanni Battista Fagiuoli, engraved by Antonio Selvi

Giovanni Battista Fagiuoli (24 June 1660 – 1742) was an Italian poet and dramatist, noted for his light and humorous works.

== Biography ==
He was born in Florence. He was known as a comic and sarcastic wit in the Medici court and salons of the 18th century. He was said to be favored by the last of the Medici rulers as a low-brow, sometimes coarse, foil to the highly erudite scholars of Florence, or by some seen as a fitting "highlight" of a corrupt and He is said to have worked in the tradition of Francesco Berni (1497/1535). In a short prefix and biography to a collection of Motte, Facezie, e Burle dei celebre buffone di Corte (Witticisms, Jokes and Pranks of the Celebrated Court Jester, printed in 1891, It describes Fagiuoli's writings thus:

Some of the jokes and witty sayings seemed to some to be more pleasant to court jesters than to a humorous and joking man. Sometimes jokes went beyond the limit; but the Prince enjoyed himself, ...laughing so as not to gnash his teeth...His satire was sometimes biting; more often sharp and cutting, seldom screeching or evil.

He was buried in the Basilica of San Lorenzo, Florence. One of his descendant is the famous architect of Verona Ettore Fagiuoli.
