= Il Malmantile racquistato =

Epic poem by Lorenzo Lippi

- by Lorenzo Lippi
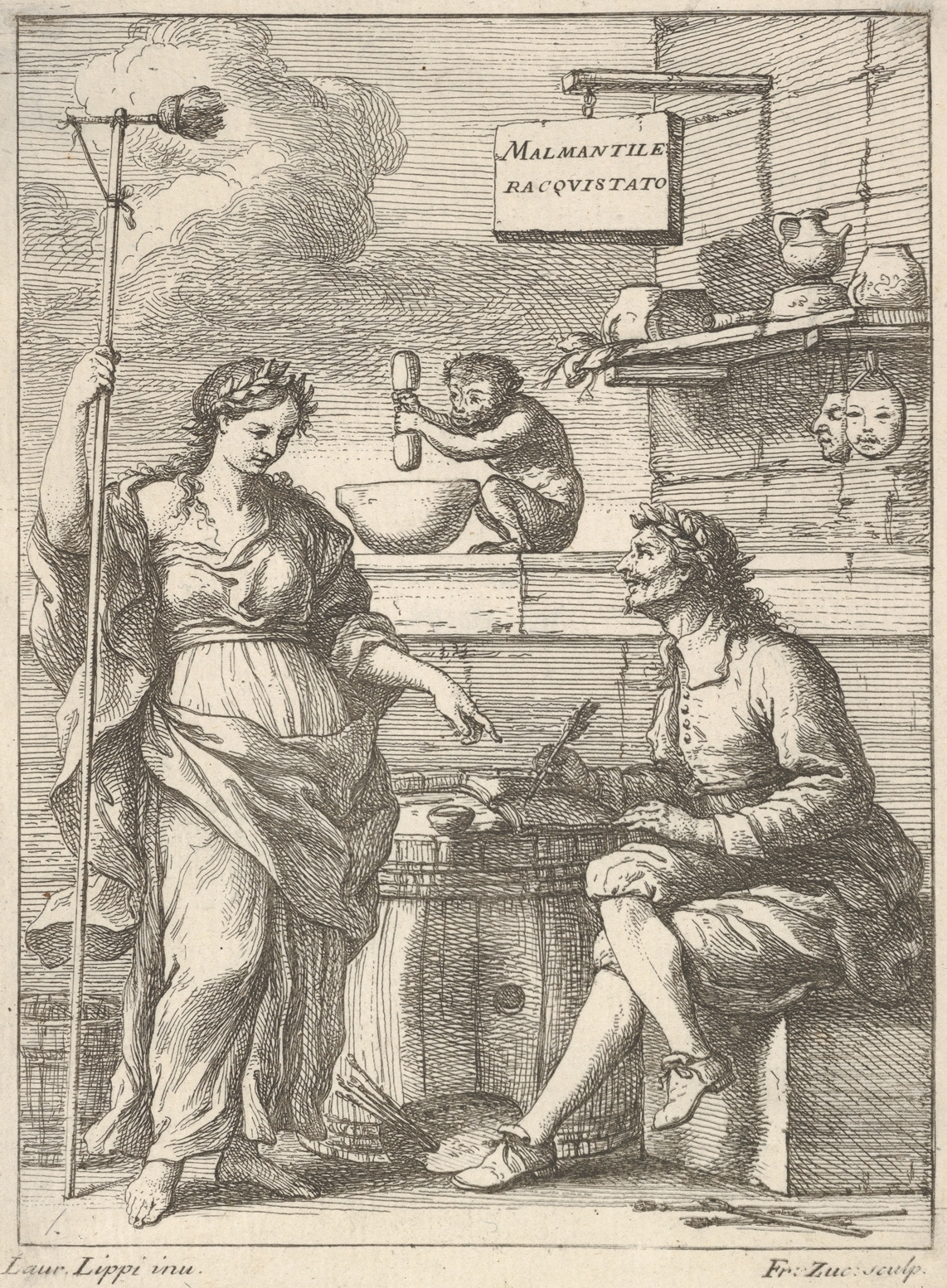
- Title page of Lorenzo Lippi's poem Il Malmantile racquistato. Print by Francesco Zuccarelli after Lorenzo Lippi
- Written: 1643–1644
- First published in: 1676
- Country: Grand Duchy of Tuscany
- Language: Italian
- Genre: mock-heroic epic poem
- Form: epic poem of 12 cantos
- Meter: ottava rima
- Rhyme scheme: abababcc
- Media type: print: hardback

Il Malmantile racquistato (Malmantile Recaptured) is an Italian mock-heroic epic poem by Lorenzo Lippi (1606–1665) first published posthumously in 1676.

== Plot ==
The poem is mostly compounded out of a variety of popular tales; its principal subject matter is an expedition for the recovery of the castle of Malmantile by the troops of Baldone, who try to reestablish the righteous reign of Queen Celidora by overthrowing her usurper Bertinella, aided by the witch Martinazza.

== Background ==
Lorenzo Lippi's Malmantile racquistato was published under the anagrammatic pseudonym of Perlone Zipoli. Il Malmantile racquistato is an Italian mock-heroic romance influenced by Alessandro Tassoni's La secchia rapita. According to Filippo Baldinucci Lippi intended the Malmantile to be the reverse of Torquato Tasso's Gerusalemme Liberata (Jerusalem Delivered).

Lippi began to write the poem in 1644. The manuscript circulated in Florence during the latter years of the seventeenth century; it was first published posthumously in 1676 and re-issued with an extensive commentary by Paolo Minucci in 1688.

Several members of the Florentine Accademia degli Apatisti, to which Lippi belonged, feature under pseudonym in the poem. The Argomenti, or themes, that precede each canto of the poem were conceived by Antonio Malatesti, a prominent member of the Academy. During the eighteenth century, Lippi’s Malmantile racquistato enjoyed immense popularity - proven by its five editions. Particularly important is the edition by canon Antonio Maria Biscioni published in Florence in 1731.

The poem is full of Florentine proverbs, sayings and popular language, and is counted by the Accademia della Crusca as a testo di lingua.
