= Gasparo Scaruffi =

Italian economist (1519–1584)

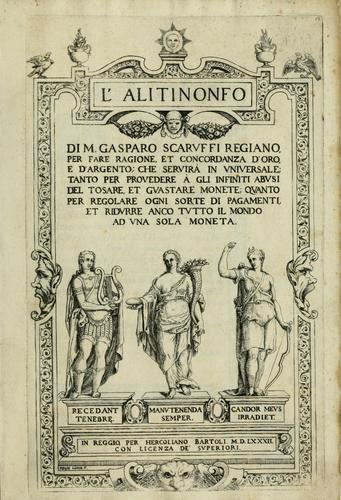
- Title page of L'Alitinonfo by Gasparo Scaruffi
- Born: 17 May 1519; Reggio Emilia, Italy
- Died: 20 September 1584 (aged 65)
- Occupations: assayer, economist

Gasparo Scaruffi (1519–1584), from Reggio Emilia was an Italian economist who proposed a universal currency in order to facilitate an open, objective and just economic system, which, he argued, was the essential foundation of a just society.

== Biography ==
Scaruffi was the youngest of Antonio di Gianfrancesco de’ Baldicelli’s seven children. Although a nobleman, Antonio was wealthy because of his activities as a merchant of spices, textiles, and haberdashery, and he left a substantial inheritance to all his children. The first records of Scaruffi's activities as an adult show him in Piacenza in 1544 as a businessman and money exchanger. In 1547, he was appointed as an assayer at the mint of Reggio by the council, eventually becoming the mint's manager (in 1552), and ultimately a spenditore (treasurer) to the council. In 1550 he travelled to the Duchy of Mantova to advocate the value of coins minted in Reggio – based on their gold content – against their devaluation in Mantova, which had been declared by a grida (fiat) of Cardinal Ercole Gonzaga. He continued to Parma, where he convinced the Duke, Ottavio Farnese, of the value of Reggio's currency without assay, but through logic and reason alone. In 1576 he likewise went as an ambassador to the Duchy of Ferrara. Through his experiences of the economic practices of different Italian duchies, and his activities assaying Italian and foreign coins, Scaruffi became convinced that the number and variation of coins in circulation, as well as arbitrary practices such as devaluation, only served to obstruct trade, and subject merchants and governors alike to excessive and unnecessary complications and negotiations. To solve these problems, he proposed a currency whose value would be universal through being based on the intrinsic value of its precious metal content.

Scaruffi published his ideas in a book entitled L’Alitinonfo (from the Ancient Greek for "True Light"), published in Reggio by Hercoliano Bartoli in 1582. This book argued not just for a universal currency, but for a society based on objective action in the light of a natural law. He saw the businessman, who seeks his goals through rational means, taking objective regard of opportunities and hindrances, and indifferent to sentiment, as the model for how all transactions and social relations should occur. He denigrated the arbitrary rule of princes, especially those who ruled extravagantly while their populaces suffered famines and other calamities, and argued that rational justice should apply to all. In L'Alitinonfo, the argument for a universal coinage based on intrinsic value and not subject to the whims of princes or the negotiations of merchants becomes a metaphor for an economy and society also based on universal standards of objectivity and justice.

Scaruffi, influenced by the notion of a natural law, mistakenly believed precious metals to have intrinsic values, rather than also being goods that have an exchange value. However, in many other ways his picture of an economy based on transparency and fair negotiation, his more extended ideas on society and justice, and the very notion of a universal currency, were very far-seeing. How much his ideas influenced other economists, of his own or later eras, is unclear, but in themselves his views represent a clear step forward from mercantilism towards a more modern conception of economics.
