= Carlo Roberto Dati =

Italian philologist and scientist (1619–1676)

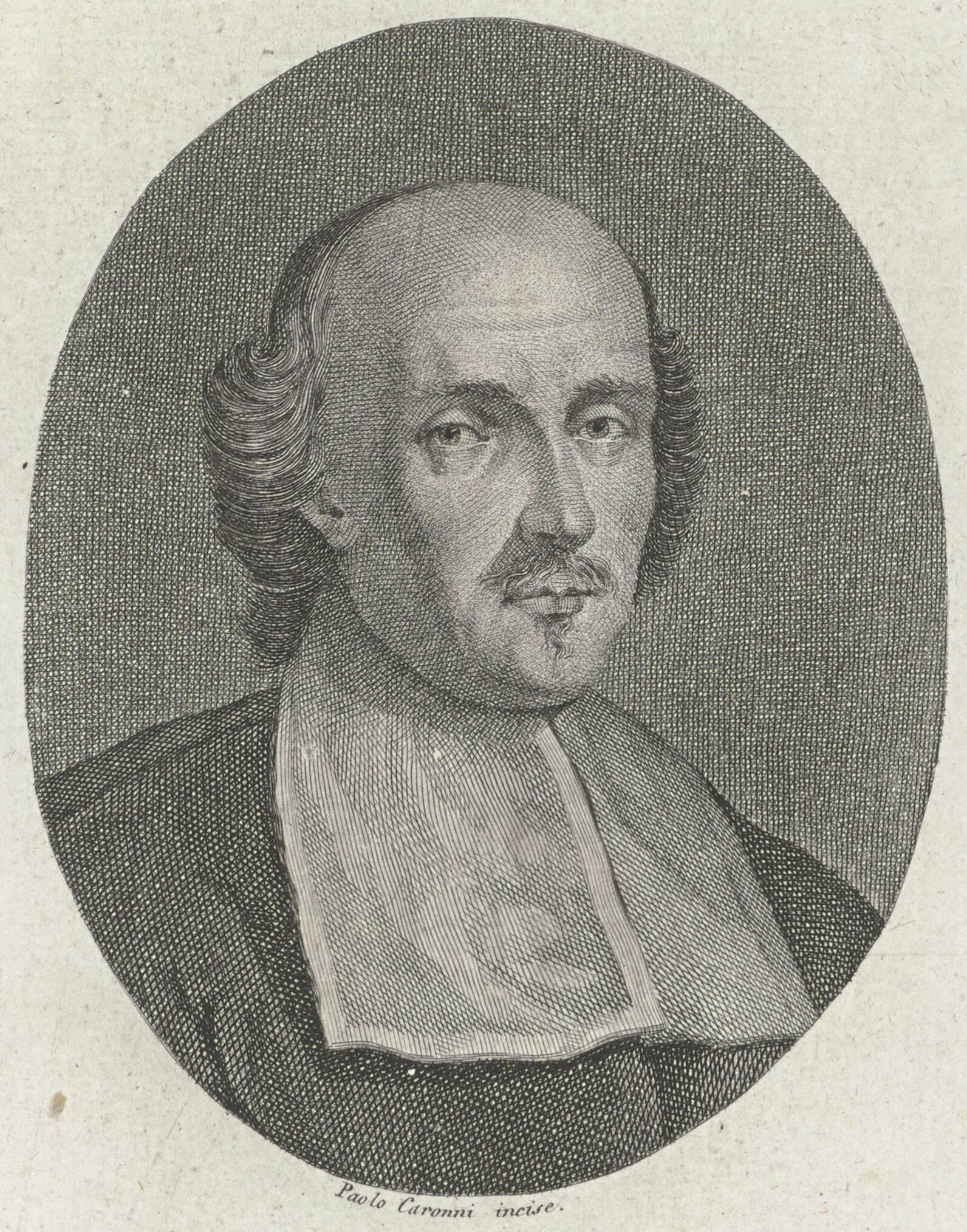
- Carlo Roberto Dati. Engraving by Paolo Caronni
- Born: October 2, 1619; Florence, Grand Duchy of Tuscany
- Died: 1 January 1676 (aged 56); Florence, Grand Duchy of Tuscany
- Burial place: Santo Spirito, Florence
- Other names: Timauro Antiate; Currado Bartoletti; Ardaclito
- Occupations: University teacher, classicist, linguist, natural philosopher
- Spouse: Lisabetta di Agnolo Galli
- Children: 4
- Parent(s): Camillo Dati and Fiammetta Dati (née Arrighetti)

Academic background
- Influences: Giovanni Battista Doni; Galileo Galilei; Evangelista Torricelli

Academic work
- Discipline: Greek scholar, Latinist, Art historian, Scientist
- Institutions: University of Florence

Carlo Roberto Dati (2 October 1619 – 1 January 1676) was a Florentine nobleman, philologist and scientist, a disciple of Galileo (1564–1642) and, in his youth, an acquaintance of Evangelista Torricelli (1608–1647).

== Biography ==
Dati was born in Florence. He received his first education from Romolo Bertini, and studied classical languages under Giovanni Battista Doni, lector of Greek at the Studio Fiorentino.

He befriended Lorenzo Magalotti (1637–1712) and Francesco Redi (1626–1697). In 1668, Redi dedicated his Experiments on the generation of insects to Dati. A founder of the Accademia del Cimento, Dati participated assiduously in its meetings. In 1640, as a 21 year old young man, Dati was admitted as a member to the exclusive Accademia della Crusca. Seven years later, he became secretary for that society, and initiated the work that led to the third edition of the Vocabolario (1691) and wrote the Discorso dell'obbligo di ben parlare la propria lingua (1657), in which he staunchly defended the supremacy of Florentine Italian. In 1645 he became a member of the Accademia degli Apatisti with the anagrammatic pseudonym of “Currado Bartoletti.” In October 1649, he earned the honor of being elected as a permanent member or apatista reggente with the pseudonym of Ardaclito. In 1648, Upon Doni's death, Dati replaced him as professor of classical literature at the Florentine Studio.

He authored many scientific works, including the Lettera ai Filaleti della vera storia della cicloide e della famosissima esperienza dell'argento vivo (translates to Letter to the Filaleti regarding the true story of the cycloid and the well-known experience with quicksilver (mercury), printed Florence, 1663), written under the pseudonym of Timauro Antiate. In it, he claimed the Tuscan – and thus Medicean – priority in the correct interpretation of Torricelli's 1644 experiment, which had sparked a lively discussion all over Europe. He also published many historical, political, and literary works, including the fascinating Vite de' pittori antichi (Lives of Ancient Painters, 1667), dedicated to Louis XIV (1638–1715), and considered the first attempt at a documentary history of painting in classical antiquity. This work earned him a European reputation and was lavishly praised by Pierre Bayle.

Dati became a friend of John Milton and Nicolaas Heinsius the Elder during their travels through Florence, and continued a correspondence with them. Dati was only eighteen years old when Milton met him, yet his eloquence and scientific and historical knowledge were already widely acknowledged. In a letter written in Latin, Dati praised the English poet while he was still in Florence; Milton saved this letter and printed it in the testimonia that preface the Latin section of his 1645 Poems. Dati is commemorated in the “emblematic lines” of Milton's Latin poem Epitaphium Damonis when describing in allegorical terms his experiences in Italian academies (Epitaphium Damonis line 137); one of Milton's letters in Latin to Dati survives (dated 21 April 1647), as do two of Dati's letters in Italian to Milton (dated 22 October/1 November 1647 and 24 November/4 December 1648 respectively). Milton listed Dati among his Italian friends in Pro populo anglicano defensio secunda.

== In fiction ==
Carlo Roberto Dati appears in Lorenzo Lippi's Il Malmantile racquistato under the anagrammatic name of Alticardo.

== Works ==
- Discorso dell'obbligo di ben parlare la propria lingua, di C. D. osseruazioni intorno al parlare, e scriuere toscano. Di G. S. con le declinazioni de' verbi di Benedetto Buommattei. Al Serenissimo Principe Leopoldo di Toscana. Florence: Francesco Onofri. 1657.
- Dissertazione sull'utilità e il diletto che reca la geometria, Florence: all'insegna della stella, 1658.
- Prose fiorentine raccolte dallo Smarrito accademico della Crusca. Al serenissimo principe Leopoldo di Toscana, Florence: nella nuova stamperia all'insegna della Stella, 1661; Florence: nella stamperia di S.A.R, per Santi Franchi, 1716–1745; Venice: presso Domenico Occhi, in Merceria sotto l'orologio all'insegna dell'Unione, 1730–1735.
- Lettera a Filaleti di Timauro Antiate della vera storia della cicloide e della famosissima esperienza dell'argento vivo. Florence. 1663.
- Delle lodi del commendatore Cassiano Dal Pozzo orazione di Carlo Dati. Florence: All'insegna della stella. 1664.
- Vite de pittori antichi scritte e illustrate da Carlo Dati nell'Accademia della Crusca lo Smarrito. Florence: Stamperia della Stella. 1667.
- Esortazione allo studio della geometria. Veglia prima. Florence: Stamperia di Borgo Ognissanti. 1814.
- Domenico Moreni, ed. (1825). Lettere di Carlo Roberto Dati. Florence: nella stamperia Magheri.
- Bartolomeo Gamba, ed. (1826). Scelta di prose di Carlo Ruberto Dati accademico della Crusca. Venice: tipografia di Alvisopoli.
