= Agostino Coltellini =

Italian scholar (1613–1693)

Doctor utriusque juris Agostino Coltellini
- Agostino Coltellini in the 1680s
- Born: April 17, 1613; Florence, Grand Duchy of Tuscany
- Died: 26 August 1693 (aged 80); Florence, Grand Duchy of Tuscany
- Resting place: San Gaetano, Florence
- Other name: Ostilio Contalgeni
- Occupations: Poet; Writer; Intellectual
- Known for: foundation of the Accademia degli Apatisti
- Parent(s): Francesco Coltellini and Lisabetta Coltellini (née Curradi)

Academic background
- Education: University of Pisa
- Influences: Horace; Dante Alighieri; Petrarch; Giovanni Boccaccio; Francesco Berni; Galileo Galilei; Giovanni Battista Strozzi; Benedetto Buonmattei

Academic work
- Discipline: Classics, Italian studies

Agostino Coltellini (17 April 1613 – 26 August 1693) was an Italian writer and intellectual, known as a scholar of Dante and the Tuscan language. Coltellini was the founder of the Accademia degli Apatisti and one of the men Milton names in the Defensio Secunda.

== Biography ==
Agostino Coltellini, was born in Florence on April 17, 1613, of a wealthy family originally from Bologna; he studied in Florence, and afterwards attended the classes of law at the University of Pisa. He received his degree in utroque iure on October 6, 1638. After taking his degree he became a lawyer. Being of weak health, he gave up the public and more laborious parts of his profession; and he seems to have been in circumstances to be independent of it.

In 1632 Coltellini founded a new Academy under the name of the Apatisti (“Dispassionates”). The Academy had grown out of meetings held by him and his young companions in his house in the Via dell'Oriuolo, during and immediately after the plague of 1630-1, for the purpose of mutual assistance and encouragement in their studies. These scholarly meetings had succeeded so well, and had been found to supply certain peculiar wants so much better than the two older Florentine academies, and than others already existing, that, about 1633, they had taken development into a society of virtuosi, which again had divided itself into a so-called "University," for grave scientific studies, and a so-called "Academy," for the cultivation of Latin and Italian literature, both under the name of the Apatisti, and with a common or at least a connecting organization.

By the year 1638, the Academy had been fully established, with its laws, its office-bearers, its patrons saints, its "protector" among the princes of the House of Medici, its device for its seal, and its motto from Dante. One of its rules (there was a similar custom in most of the Italian academies) was that every member should, in his academic connexions, be known not by his own name but by some anagram or pseudonym. Coltellini's Apatistic name was "Ostilio Contalgeni."

Coltellini died on August 26, 1693, at the age of eighty years. In the course of his long life he had attained many distinctions. He had been made a member of the Accademia della Crusca in 1650; he had filled no fewer than four times, between 1659 and his death, the presidency or consulship of the Accademia Fiorentina; he had been made a member of the Academy of Arcadia under the name of Alcino Tipaniese; and he had published a series of compositions in prose and in verse, the titles of which make a considerable list. But the chief distinction of his life was his having founded the Apatisti. Such were the attractions of this academy, and so energetic was Coltellini in its behalf, that within ten or twenty years after its foundation, it had a fame among the Italian academies equal, in some respects, to that of the first and oldest, and counted among its members not only all the eminent Florentines, but most of the distinguished Italian intellectuals, besides cardinals, Italian princes and dukes, many foreign nobles and scholars, and at least one pope. John Milton was a member of the Academy during his Italian sojourn of 1638-1639.

== Works ==
- Il Giudizio divino. Florence: nella Stamperia nuoua. 1638.
- Cicalata sopra il sonetto di Francesco Berni "Chiome d'argento fine irte e attorte". Florence: nella stamperia di Amador Massi. 1651.
- Instituzioni dell'anatomia del corpo umano. Florence: per Amadore Massi. 1651.
- Rime piacevoli. Florence: per il Massi. 1652.
- Discorsi sacri. Florence: per i Landi. 1654.
- Apparecchio al gran passaggio, o vero gradi della passione, i quali si recitano ogni domenica nella chiesa de’ padri giesuiti, insieme con altre preci per impetrare santa morte da Giesù crocifisso, per intercessione di Maria Vergine addolorata. Esplicati con toscana parafrasi [...] all’Illustriss. e Clariss. Sig. il Sig. Cavaliere Piero Girolami senatore, e segret. di S.A.S., In Firenze, per Francesco Onofri, 1661; 23, [1] p.; 12°.
- Ars salutis sive Institutio perfecte vivendi. Florentiae: ex Typographia S. M. D. 1665.
- Rime sacre. Florence: nella Stamperia di S. A. S. 1667.
- Gufonis de Gufonibus Epistolarum semicenturia prima. Florentiae: ex typographia Hippolyti de Naue. 1668.
- Enimmi. Florence: nella Stamperia di Francesco Onofri. 1669.
- Mantissa Fidenziana. Florence: per Francesco Onofri. 1669.
- Il testamento di S. Gregorio Nazianzeno volgarizato da Agostino Coltellini accademico Apatista. Florence: per Giouanni Gugliantini. 1677.

== Bibliography ==
- Masson, David (1875). The Life of John Milton: Narrated in Connexion with the Political, Ecclesiastical, and Literary History of His Time. Vol. 1. Macmillan and Company.
- Benvenuti, Edoardo (1910). Agostino Coltellini e l'Accademia degli Apatisti a Firenze nel secolo XVII. Pistoia: Officina Tip. Cooperativa.
- Capucci, Martino (1982). "COLTELLINI, Agostino". Dizionario Biografico degli Italiani (in Italian). Vol. 27: Collenuccio–Confortini. Rome: Institute of the Italian Encyclopaedia. ISBN 978-88-12-00032-6.
- Crimi, Giuseppe (2021). "Esegesi burlesca del Seicento: la Cicalata di Agostino Coltellini sopra il sonetto Chiome d'argento fine, irte e attorte". L'Ellisse. 16 (1–2): 129–154. ISSN 1826-0187.
