= Accademia Fiorentina =

Italian academy founded in 1540

- Formation: 1 November 1540
- Dissolved: 7 July 1783
- Type: philosophical academy
- Purpose: promotion of Tuscan as the basis for literary Italian
- Location: Florence, Republic of Florence

The Accademia Fiorentina was a philosophical and literary learned academy established in Florence in the Republic of Florence during the Italian Renaissance. It was active from 1540 to 1783.

== History ==
The Accademia Fiorentina was founded in Florence on 1 November 1540 as the Accademia degli Umidi, or "academy of the wet ones", in contrast to – or parody of – the name of the recently-founded Accademia degli Infiammati, or "academy of the burning ones", of Padua. The twelve founding members were Baccio Baccelli, Bartolomeo Benci, Pier Fabbrini, Paolo de Gei, Antonfrancesco Grazzini, Gismondo Martelli, Niccolò Martelli, Giovanni Mazzuoli, Cynthio d'Amelia Romano, Filippo Salvetti, Michelangelo Vivaldi and Simon della Volta. Within a few months of its foundation, on 25 March 1541, the academy changed its name to Accademia Fiorentina, in accordance with the wishes of Cosimo I de' Medici.

In 1783, by order of Grand Duke Pietro Leopoldo, the Accademia Fiorentina was merged, together with the Accademia degli Apatisti and the Accademia della Crusca, into the new Accademia Fiorentina Seconda.

== Activities ==
The principal topic of discussion of the academy was the question of what should constitute the basis for the Italian language, which until about this time was not so called; rather, it was referred to as volgare, roughly "the common tongue". While the Infiammati supported the suggestions of Pietro Bembo and Giovan Giorgio Trissino that the language of Boccaccio and Petrarch should serve as a model for literary Italian, the Umidi believed it should be based on contemporary Florentine usage and on the language of Dante. Three of them, Giambattista Gelli (1498–1563), Pier Francesco Giambullari (1495–1555) and Carlo Lenzoni (1501–1551), wrote treatises in support of this position.
