= Questione della lingua =

Renaissance debate

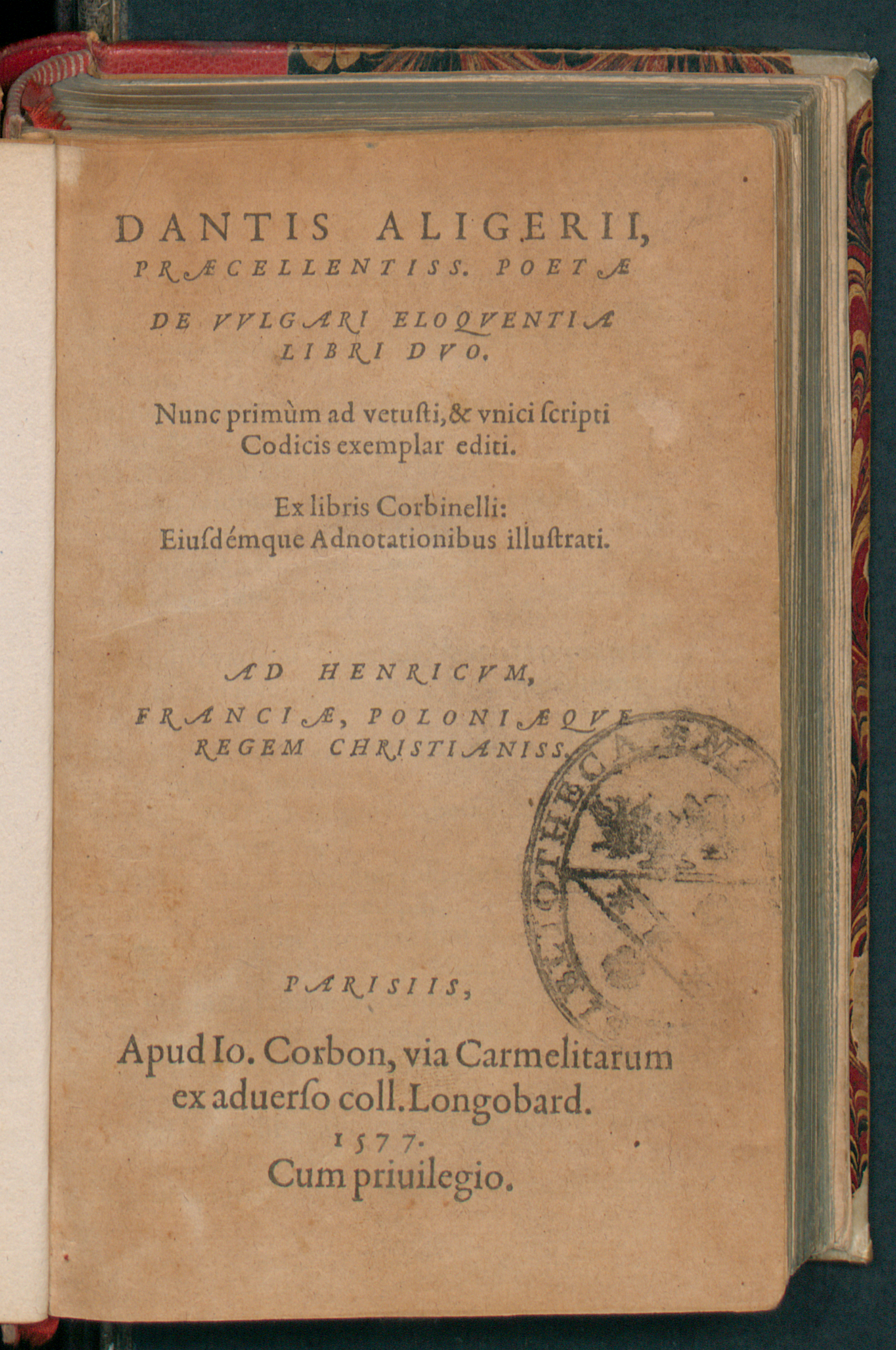
De vulgari eloquentia, 1577

The Questione della lingua (Language question) was a debate that emerged in late medieval and Renaissance Italy concerning the nature of the linguistic practice to be adopted in the written Italian language. Literary Italian developed in various forms in the 13th and 14th centuries. Unlike English and French, its development did not follow that of a national spoken language, since this emerged only after the Unification of Italy in 1860. Thus writers mostly had to acquire a knowledge of the written language by literary imitation, instead of drawing on their native speech. It was the lack of a national spoken language on which to base the language of literature that gave rise to the protracted and controversial debate about what the standard literary language should be.

== Dante ==
The first person to turn his attention to the matter was Dante Alighieri, who in his De vulgari eloquentia (c. 1303–c. 1305) put forward the view that the language of literature should be based on no single dialect, but should draw on the best elements of all, to achieve the universal quality to which he aspired as a stylistic ideal (though in practice he himself wrote in an enriched form of his own Florentine variety of Tuscan). Dante drew a detailed and accurate map of the different dialects found in the Italian peninsula and islands, as he endeavoured to describe a supraregional form of Italian, the ‘illustrious vernacular’ (vulgare illustre), which could serve as a sophisticated literary tool.

== Renaissance period ==
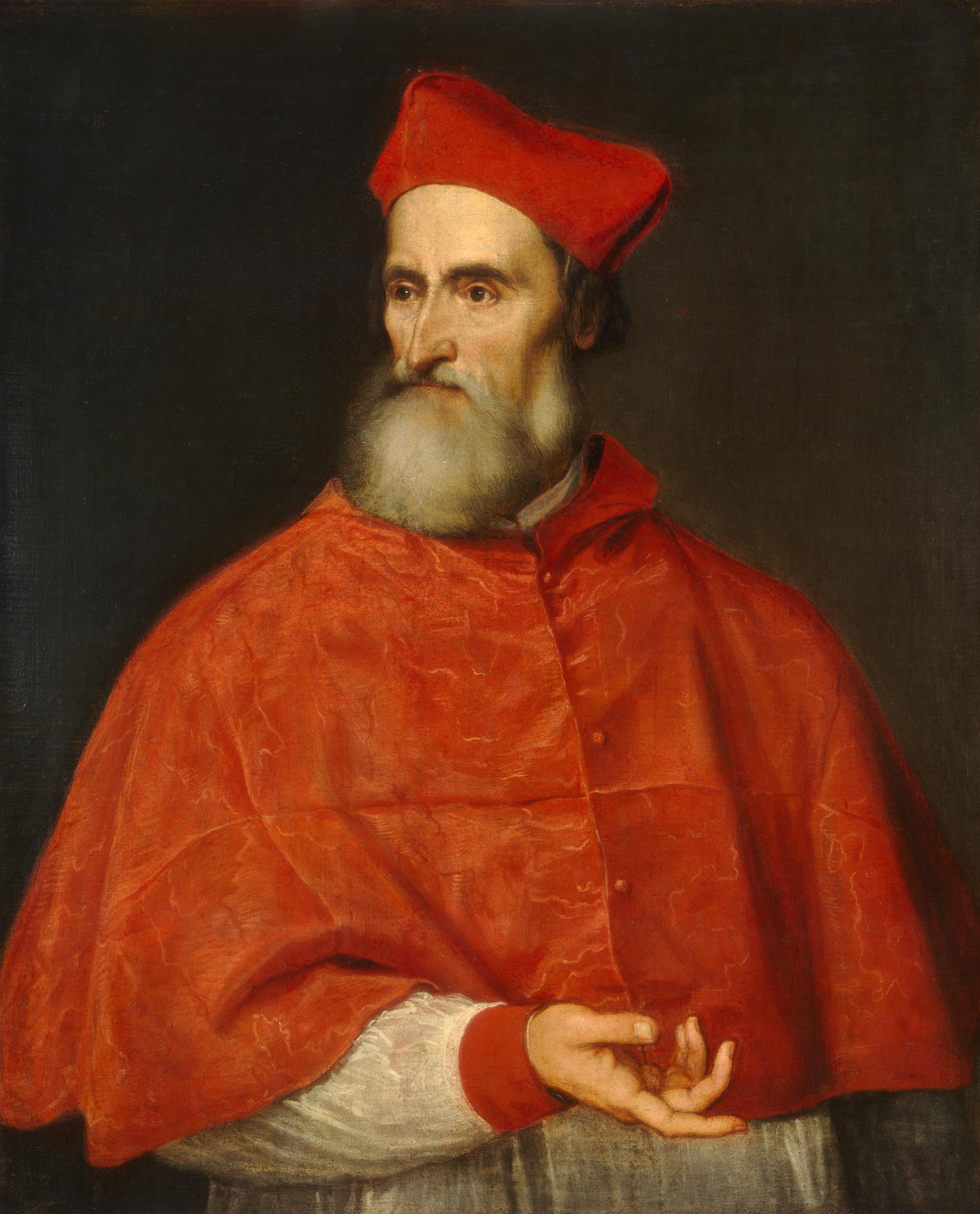
Titian: Portrait of Pietro Bembo (1539) Washington, National Gallery of Art

The critical period of the debate came in the 16th century, when writers' minds were focused on the urgent need to agree on a standard by the impact of printing. We can distinguish four main positions in the debate, though the various participants cannot always be fitted neatly into one or other of them:

- favouring archaic Tuscan, to be learnt by literary imitation (e.g. Pietro Bembo);
- writing in a language drawn from contemporary Tuscan (e.g. Claudio Tolomei);
- employing an archaic common language, based on literary imitation, but not solely of Tuscan (e.g. Girolamo Muzio);
- adopting a contemporary common language (the lingua cortigiana), based on the usage of the main courts of Italy (e.g. Gian Giorgio Trissino).

The decisive influence was that of Bembo, who argued in his Prose della volgar lingua (1525) that writers of Italian should model themselves on Petrarch in verse and Giovanni Boccaccio in prose, just as the humanists wrote their Latin by imitating Virgil and Cicero. Florentine Tuscan, learnt by imitation of the great writers of the past, was almost universally adhered to thereafter as the basis of literary Italian. Bembo's ideas were of crucial importance because they provided Italians with a practical means of acquiring a common literary language in a divided nation with no national spoken tongue to draw on.

== The Vocabolario degli Accademici della Crusca ==
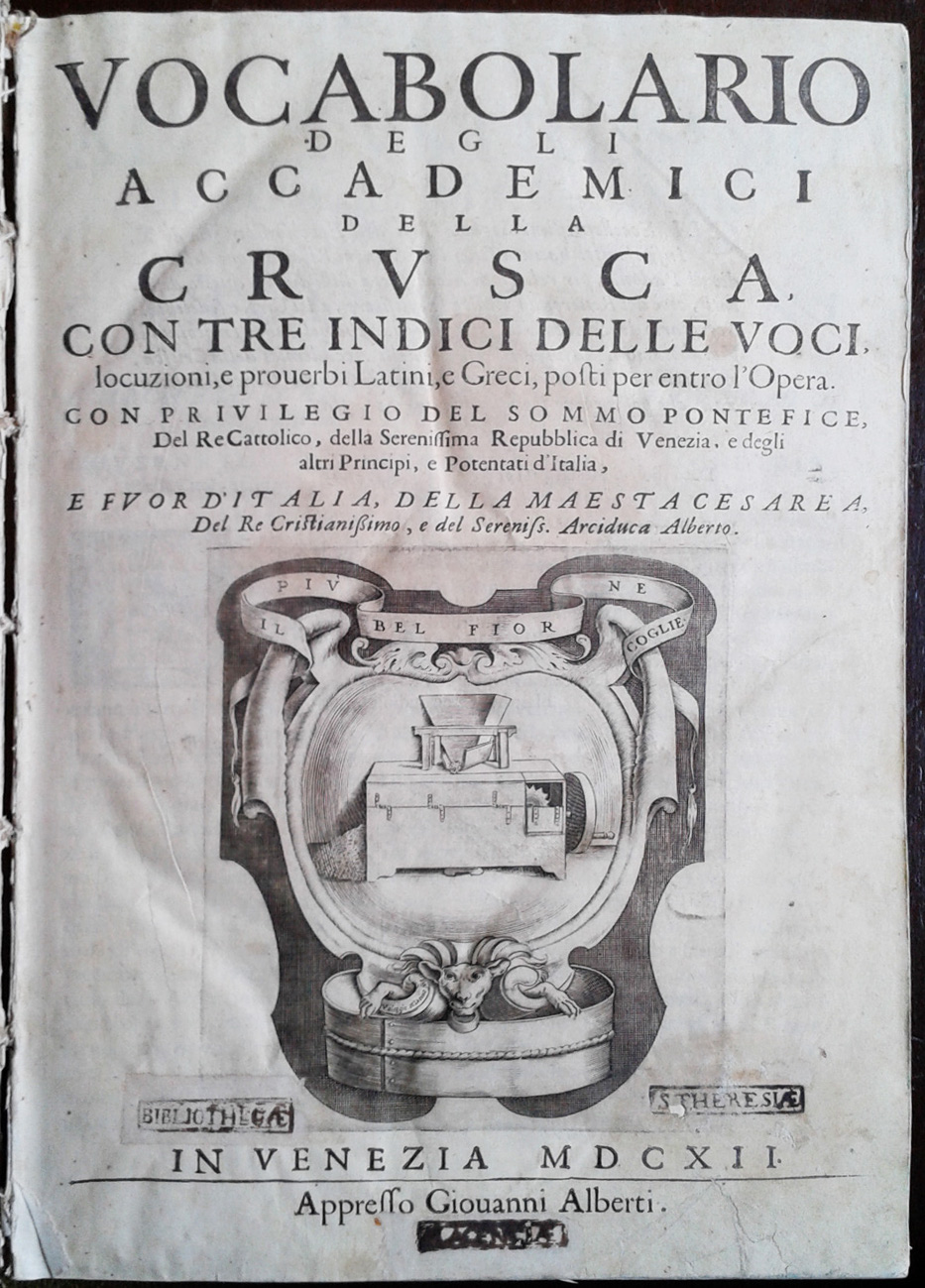
Title page of the Vocabolario degli Accademici della Crusca, first edition, 1612

The Florentine model was also supported by the authority of the Vocabolario degli Accademici della Crusca. Begun in 1590 and printed in Venice in 1612, the Vocabolario was based on Lionardo Salviati's canon of 14th-century Florentine texts, quoting other authors only if they used good Florentine. Fuller and better organized than earlier dictionaries, the Vocabolario provided a model for the Académie Française and projects in Germany and Spain; but it excluded many technical and scientific terms and was characterized by an archaizing purism. The pro-Florentine, pro-14th-century bias of the dictionary, which excluded authors as Torquato Tasso from its list of modern linguistic authorities, angered many writers, who, like Paolo Beni, saw Tasso as the greatest poet ever.

After a largely unchanged second edition (Venice, 1623), the third (Florence, 1691) drew on more modern authors, listed more scientific and everyday terms, and marked some words as archaic.

== Baroque period ==
While the Vocabolario contributed to the maturing of linguistic national consciousness and to the linguistic unification of Italy even during political divisions and foreign occupation, the Academy's linguistic purism aroused hostility in several distinguished philologists, notably Paolo Beni, who argued against the geographical and temporal restrictions of the Vocabolario, in the name of a modern Italian language that combined the best of 14th-century usage in a non-regional, regulated, up-to-date vernacular. In reply to Beni's anti-Florentine and anti-archaic views, Benedetto Fioretti, like Lionardo Salviati, maintained the excellence of the Florentine language, which for him was proven by the close similarities between contemporary Florentine and the language of Dante and Petrarch.

In his Postille al Vocabolario della Crusca, Alessandro Tassoni took a stand against the 14th-century models of Pietro Bembo and the Accademia della Crusca, finding the basis of good expression in common usage, drawing on a variety and range of sources, and on the spontaneity of spoken language.

Another contribution to the debate came from the Jesuit writer Daniello Bartoli who, in his famous Il torto e 'l diritto del non-si può (1655), argued against the restrictive and prescriptive principles of the Vocabolario della Crusca in favour of openness based on educated good taste and judgement. Bartoli's contribution to the question of Italian spelling practice, Dell'ortografia italiana (1670), used the same criteria.

== The Sienese school ==
During the 17th century, the Sienese School of philologists, which rejected Florentine exclusivity, flourished and advocated the use of a more widely Tuscan language. Its leading members were Celso Cittadini, Scipione Bargagli, Diomede Borghesi, Orazio Lombardelli, and Adriano Politi.

In his Il Turamino (1602) Bargagli described the Sienese variety of Tuscan and justified its literary use, in reaction to the dominance of Florentine.

The Sienese classicist Adriano Politi, who, like Beni and Tassoni, was inspired to contribute to the debate about the Italian language by the publication of the Vocabolario degli Accademici della Crusca in 1612, resented the Florentine bias of the dictionary, and brought out his own version, the Dittionario toscano, which gives the Sienese equivalent for each Florentine word.

Girolamo Gigli tried to prove the superiority of Sienese over Florentine Italian in a polemical Vocabolario cateriniano (published in 1717 with the works of St Catherine of Siena).

== Age of Enlightenment ==
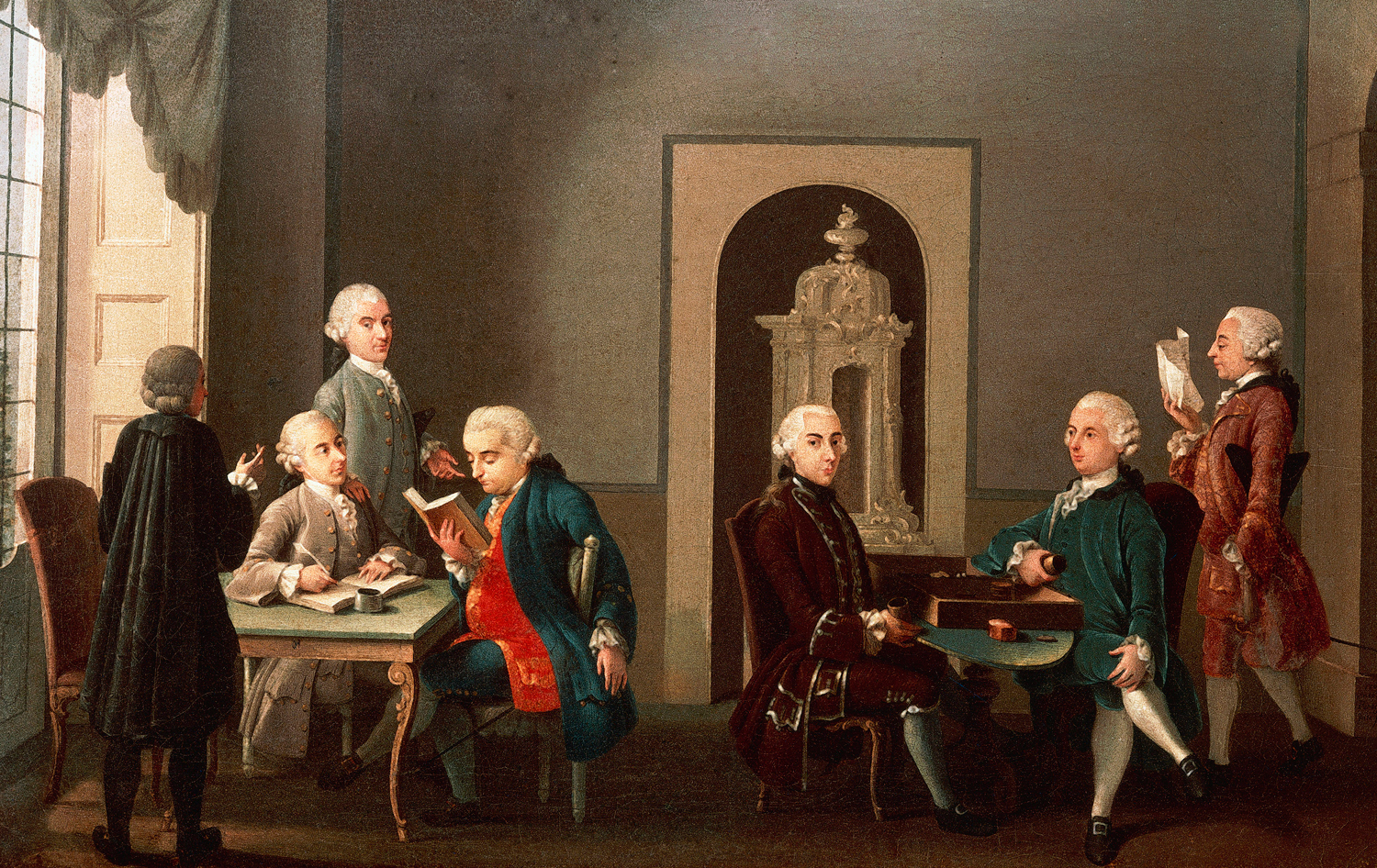
The members of the Milanese Accademia dei Pugni. From left to right: Alfonso Longo (back), Alessandro Verri, Giambattista Biffi, Cesare Beccaria, Luigi Lambertenghi, Pietro Verri and Giuseppe Visconti di Saliceto.

By the end of the 17th century the debate ceased to be concerned with the problem of which dialect to choose as the basis of the written language, but concentrated instead on what kind of Florentine should be used and how far it should be allowed to develop from its base: whether it should remain an archaic language with a narrow literary vocabulary, learnt by imitation; or display a less rigid adherence to its base, as Melchiorre Cesarotti urged in the 18th century, and enrich the traditional vocabulary by borrowing from other European languages such as French, as argued by Pietro Verri and other contributors to the Enlightenment journal Il Caffè; or whether one should adopt a more modern standard based on the contemporary speech of educated Florentines, as Alessandro Manzoni believed.

Those who proposed such alternatives to Bembo's solution were in the minority, however; the majority continued to learn their Italian by imitating the great writers of the past. As a consequence, written Italian remained a very bookish language, far removed from the realities of speech.

== Antonio Cesari and purism ==
The 19th century saw the emergence of the movement of literary purism. Purism was based both on veneration for the 14th century and on distaste for neologisms and foreign borrowings, especially from French. Basing their theories on the writings of Pietro Bembo and Lionardo Salviati, purists maintained that literary usage should imitate the 14th-century Florentine language. This view was contested by several Enlightenment writers, and the terms purismo and purista (first recorded 1758–9 but not used in print until 1838) were introduced to denote linguistic affectation or archaism. The main exponents of purism were the Neapolitan literary critic Basilio Puoti (the teacher of Francesco de Sanctis and Giacinto de' Sivo) and the Veronese philologist Antonio Cesari, who published an unofficial expanded edition of the Vocabolario della Crusca (1806–11). Cesari represents the most extreme form of reaction against French influence on Italian, and against the ‘corrupting’ modernist positions of Cesarotti's Saggio sulla filosofia delle lingue, in favour of the linguistic ‘purity’ of 14th-century Tuscan texts. His work was fiercely attacked by Vincenzo Monti in his proposal for additions and corrections to the Vocabolario (1817–24). In his treatises Degli scrittori del Trecento e de' loro imitatori (1818) and Dell'amor patrio di Dante e del suo libro intorno al Volgare Eloquio (1820) Monti's literary associate Giulio Perticari maintained that the language of every other century has equal claims with that of the fourteenth to be regarded as the true Italian.

== Alessandro Manzoni ==
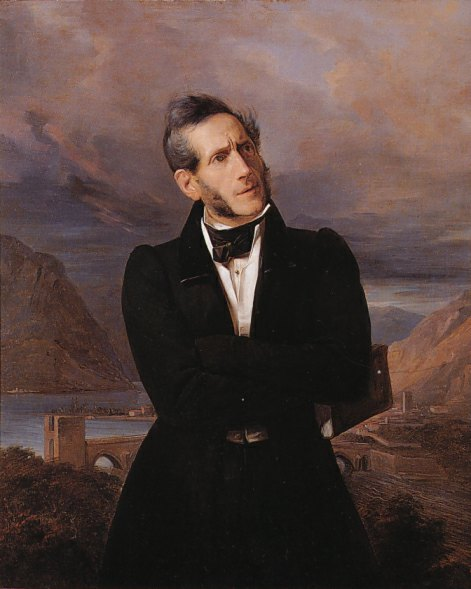
Alessandro Manzoni

Manzoni reacted against the archaic and artificial nature of Italian literary language, and sought to rejuvenate it by making the language of his novel The Betrothed conform in its second edition, as far as he was able (for he was Milanese), to the educated Florentine spoken in his day. But while this solution was more satisfactory to him personally as a writer, there is no doubt that Bembo's was more practical since all those who had access to education could learn Italian from books, while not everyone had the opportunity or the inclination to go to Florence for long periods to learn from the speech of its inhabitants. There is another and more important reason why Manzoni's solution was not acceptable on a national basis. Italian has always been more than a written form of the Florentine dialect. Though national languages generally originate in the speech of a particular area, they are also the product of education and culture, and outgrow their local origins, absorbing features from elsewhere, to become the property of the whole nation.

== Graziadio Isaia Ascoli ==
When, in the years immediately following Unification, Manzoni and his followers tried to make Italian conform to certain local peculiarities of contemporary Florentine usage not found in the literary language, their efforts were unsuccessful, and the futility of the exercise was exposed by the great 19th-century linguist Graziadio Isaia Ascoli in his preface to the first volume of the Archivio glottologico italiano (1873). Ascoli understood that the problem could no longer be solved artificially by imposing a model, if Italian was to become the spoken and written possession of the whole nation, instead of the preserve of an educated elite. He knew that it was not possible to get ordinary people to adopt an educated standard, Florentine or otherwise, unless the level of their culture was raised so that they could absorb it. The solution lay therefore not in trying to persuade people to accept Florentine or any other model, but in raising the nation's general level of education and allowing the process of natural selection to take its course. This is substantially what has happened, and as a result, the language has actually become less rather than more Florentine since Unification, because of the influence of Rome in government administration and the media, and of Northern Italy in the economic life of the nation.

== Bibliography ==
- Hall, Jr., Robert A. (1942). "The Significance of the Italian "Questione della Lingua"". Studies in Philology. 39 (1): 1–10. JSTOR 4172552.
- Carrannante, Antonio (1977). "Carlo Cattaneo e Carlo Tenca di fronte alle teorie linguistiche del Manzoni". Giornale Storico della Letteratura Italiana. 486: 213–237.
- Carrannante, Antonio (1978). "Le discussioni sulla lingua italiana nella prima metà del Novecento". Belfagor. XXXIII: 621–634.
- Davies, Anna Morpurgo (2003). "Ascoli, Graziadio Isaia". The Oxford Companion to Italian Literature. Oxford University Press. ISBN 978-0-19-530745-0.
- Ascoli, Graziadio Isaia (2008). Scritti sulla questione della lingua. Turin: Einaudi. ISBN 978-8-80-619008-8.
- Marazzini, Claudio (2011). "Questione della lingua". Enciclopedia dell'Italiano. Istituto dell'Enciclopedia Italiana.
- La questione della lingua: antologia di testi da Dante a oggi. Rome: Carocci. 2012.
- Bottoni, Luciano (2014). "La questione della lingua". In Umberto Eco (ed.). Storia della civiltà europea. Istituto dell'Enciclopedia Italiana.
- Marazzini, Claudio (2018). Breve storia della questione della lingua. Rome: Carocci. ISBN 978-8-84-309085-3.
