= 1532 =

1532 in various calendars
- Gregorian calendar: 1532; MDXXXII
- Ab urbe condita: 2285
- Armenian calendar: 981; ԹՎ ՋՁԱ
- Assyrian calendar: 6282
- Balinese saka calendar: 1453–1454
- Bengali calendar: 938–939
- Berber calendar: 2482
- English Regnal year: 23 Hen. 8 – 24 Hen. 8
- Buddhist calendar: 2076
- Burmese calendar: 894
- Byzantine calendar: 7040–7041
- Chinese calendar: 辛卯年 (Metal Rabbit); 4229 or 4022 — to — 壬辰年 (Water Dragon); 4230 or 4023
- Coptic calendar: 1248–1249
- Discordian calendar: 2698
- Ethiopian calendar: 1524–1525
- Hebrew calendar: 5292–5293
- Hindu calendars
- Vikram Samvat: 1588–1589
- Shaka Samvat: 1453–1454
- Kali Yuga: 4632–4633
- Holocene calendar: 11532
- Igbo calendar: 532–533
- Iranian calendar: 910–911
- Islamic calendar: 938–939
- Japanese calendar: Kyōroku 5 / Tenbun 1 (天文元年)
- Javanese calendar: 1450–1451
- Julian calendar: 1532; MDXXXII
- Korean calendar: 3865
- Minguo calendar: 380 before ROC 民前380年
- Nanakshahi calendar: 64
- Thai solar calendar: 2074–2075
- Tibetan calendar: ལྕགས་མོ་ཡོས་ལོ་ (female Iron-Hare); 1658 or 1277 or 505 — to — ཆུ་ཕོ་འབྲུག་ལོ་ (male Water-Dragon); 1659 or 1278 or 506

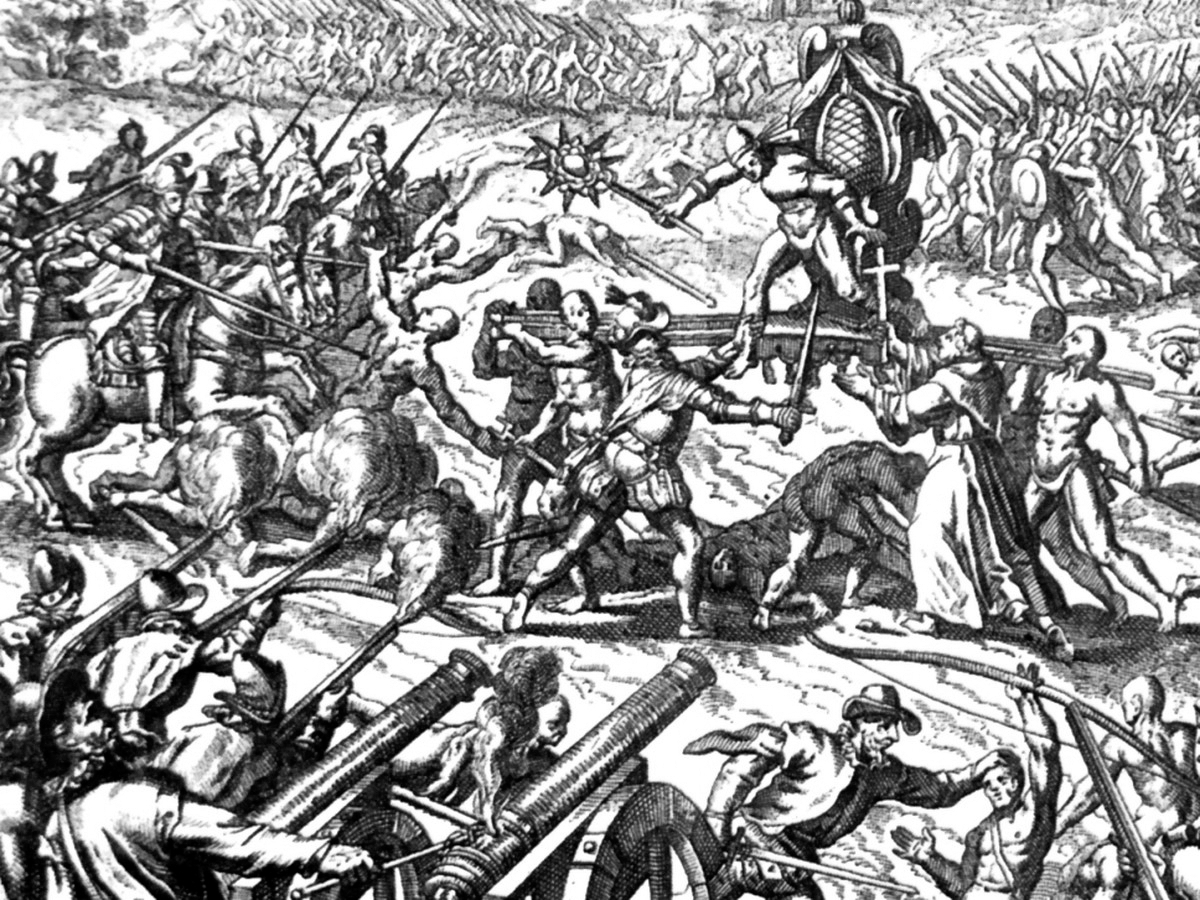
November 16: The Battle of Cajamarca is fought between the Spanish Empire and the Inca Empire.

Year 1532 (MDXXXII) was a leap year starting on Monday of the Julian calendar.

== Events ==
=== January–March ===
- January 22 – São Vicente is established as the first permanent Portuguese settlement in Brazil.
- February 12 – The Deceived Ones (Gl'ingannati), a stage comedy written collectively by the Accademia degli Intronati in Siena, makes its debut as part of the festivities of the Italian city's annual carnival.
- February 24 – William Warham, the 81-year-old Roman Catholic Archbishop of Canterbury, publicly declares that he is disassociating himself from all acts of the English Parliament that are prejudicial to papal authority.
- March 18 – The Supplication against the Ordinaries is presented to Henry VIII by Thomas More the Speaker of the House of Commons. Henry responds by stating that the Commons could hardly expect such consideration after they refused to assent to the government's proposals. Shortly afterwards, Parliament is prorogued until April 10.

=== April–June ===
- April 27 – The democratic government of the Republic of Florence in Italy, in existence for more than 400 years since its founding in 1115, is abolished by order of Pope Clement VII in order for a hereditary, and absolute, monarchy to be established. Alessandro de' Medici, Duke of Florence, the illegitimate son of Pope Clement, is given full power and the Republic's parliament (the Signoria) and the rule of the executive officer, the Gonfaloniere, come to an end.
- April – Battle of Quipaipan in Peru: Atahualpa wins the civil war in the Inca Empire, defeating his brother Huáscar.
- May 13 – Francisco Pizarro lands on the northern coast of Peru.
- May 16 – Sir Thomas More resigns as Lord Chancellor of England.
- June 25 – Suleiman the Magnificent leads another invasion of Hungary.

=== July–September ===
- July 23 – The Nuremberg Religious Peace is granted to members of the Schmalkaldic League, granting them religious liberty.
- August 13 – Union of Brittany and France: The Duchy of Brittany is absorbed into the Kingdom of France.
- August 5 – The siege of Güns in the Austrian Empire begins as the Ottoman army, under Sultan Suleiman the Magnificent, attempts to take the city of Güns (now Kőszeg in Hungary) with 100,000 troops in order to mount a larger invasion of the Austrian city of Vienna, capital of the Holy Roman Empire. The defenders, less than 800 Croatian soldiers commanded by Nikola Jurišić, puts up a successful resistance despite being outnumbered by more than 100 to 1.
- August 30 – The siege of Güns fails as heavy rains and the arrival of reinforcements from Charles V, Holy Roman Emperor to supplement the Croatian defenders, causes Suleiman to retreat.
- September 1 – Anne Boleyn is created Marquess of Pembroke by her fiancé, King Henry VIII of England.

=== October–December ===
- October 7 – (9th waxing of Tazaungmon 894 ME) The Burmese monarch Min Bin, King of Arrakan, leads a combined invasion force of 12,000 people (three armies of 11,000 men in a three-pronged attack, and a flotilla of war boats carrying 1,000 troops) in an invasion of Bengal in India.
- November 16 – Francisco Pizarro and his men capture Inca emperor Atahualpa at Cajamarca, ambushing and slaughtering a large number of his followers, without loss to themselves. He subsequently offers a ransom of approximately $50 million in gold.
- December 1 – (5th waxing of Pyatho 894 ME) The Burmese Army under Min Bin marches into Dhaka, capital of Bengal without any resistance.
- December 4 – A fire strikes the cathedral in Chambéry, now a part of France, but at the time a part of Italy's Duchy of Savoy. The fire burns several holes in the Shroud of Turin, believed by some Roman Catholics to be the burial shroud of Jesus of Nazareth after the crucifixion, and to have a miraculous imprint of Jesus, but the shroud is repaired by nuns at the cathedral.
- December 20 – The first payment for Atahualpa's ransom from the Spaniards is made as gold is delivered to Cuzco to fill up a room.

=== Date unknown ===
- The Prince is published, five years after the death of the author, Niccolò Machiavelli.
- Pantagruel is published by François Rabelais.
- Henry VIII of England grants the Thorne brothers a Royal Charter to found Bristol Grammar School.
- Stamford School is founded in England by William Radcliffe.
- The Paris Parlement has the city's beggars arrested "to force them to work in the sewers, chained together in pairs".
- Possible date for the Battle of the Maule between Incas and Mapuches, according to historian Osvaldo Silva.

== Births ==
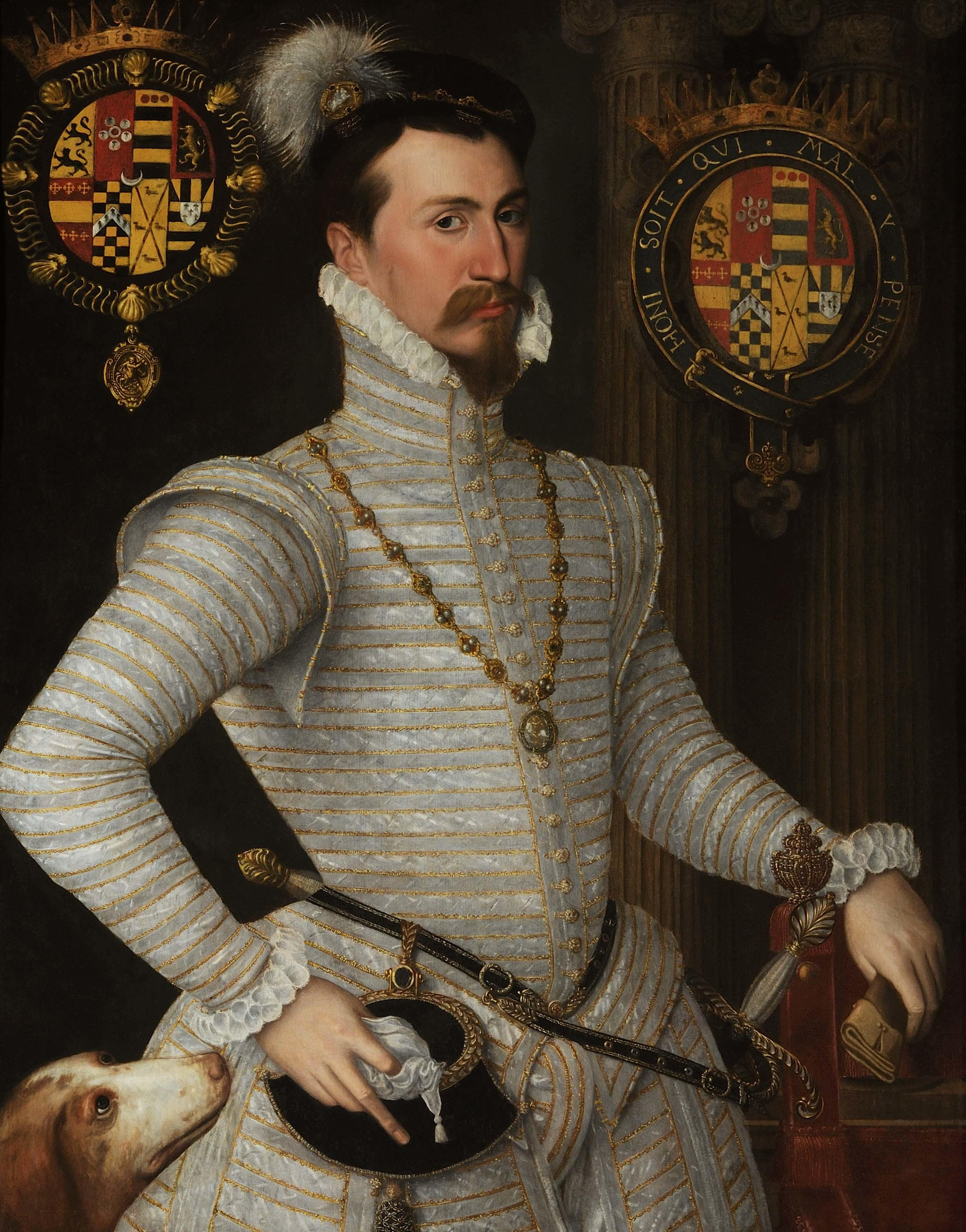
Robert Dudley, 1st Earl of Leicester

- January 21 – Ludwig Helmbold, German classical singer (d. 1598)
- February 14 – Richard Lowther, English soldier and official (d. 1607)
- February 19 – Jean-Antoine de Baïf, French poet and member of the Pléiade (d. 1589)
- March 20 – Juan de Ribera, Spanish Catholic archbishop (d. 1611)
- March 25 – Pietro Pontio, Italian music theorist and composer (d. 1596)
- April 21 – Martin Schalling the Younger, German theologian (d. 1608)
- April 23 – Anna Marie of Brunswick-Lüneburg, Duchess of Prussia (d. 1568)
- June 1 – Marino Grimani, Doge of Venice (d. 1605)
- June 6 – Giulio Antonio Santorio, Italian Catholic cardinal (d. 1602)
- June 7 – Amy Robsart, wife of Robert Dudley, 1st Earl of Leicester (d. 1560)
- June 13 – Countess Palatine Helena of Simmern, countess consort of Hanau-Münzenberg (1551-1561) (d. 1579)
- June 16 – Francis Coster, Brabantian Jesuit theologian, author (d. 1619)
- June 24
  - Robert Dudley, 1st Earl of Leicester, English politician (probable; d. 1588)
  - William IV, Landgrave of Hesse-Kassel, German Protestant leader (d. 1592)
- July 12 – Mechthild of Bavaria, German duchess (d. 1565)
- July 25 – Alphonsus Rodriguez, Spanish Jesuit lay brother and saint (d. 1617)
- August 14 – Archduchess Magdalena of Austria, Member of the House of Habsburg (d. 1590)
- October 4 – Francisco de Toledo, Spanish Jesuit cardinal (d. 1596)
- October 30 – Yuri of Uglich, Prince of Uglich (d. 1563)
- November 16 – Clara of Brunswick-Wolfenbüttel, Abbess of Gandersheim, later Duchess of Brunswick-Grubenhagen (d. 1595)
- November 22 – Anne of Denmark, Electress of Saxony (d. 1585)
- December 7 – Louis I, Count of Sayn-Wittgenstein (d. 1605)
- December 20
  - John Günther I, Count of Schwarzburg-Sondershausen (d. 1586)
  - Orazio Samacchini, Italian painter (d. 1577)
- December 26 – Guilielmus Xylander, German classical scholar (d. 1576)
- date unknown
  - Robert Abercromby, Scottish Jesuit missionary (d. 1613)
  - William Allen, English cardinal (d. 1594)
  - Hernando Franco, Spanish composer (d. 1585)
  - Luís Fróis, Portuguese missionary (d. 1597)
  - Pedro Sarmiento de Gamboa, Spanish explorer (d. 1592)
  - John Hawkins, English navigator and slave trader (d. 1595)
  - Étienne Jodelle, French dramatist and poet (d. 1573)
  - Ralph Lane, English explorer (d. 1603)
  - Henry Percy, 8th Earl of Northumberland (d. 1585)
  - Thomas Norton, English lawyer (d. 1584)
  - Tulsidas, medieval Hindi poet and philosopher (d. 1623)
  - Flavio Orsini, Italian Catholic cardinal (d. 1581)
  - Thomas Lucy, English politician (d. 1600)
- probable
  - Sofonisba Anguissola, Italian portrait painter (d. 1625)
  - Orlande de Lassus, Flemish composer (d. 1594)

== Deaths ==
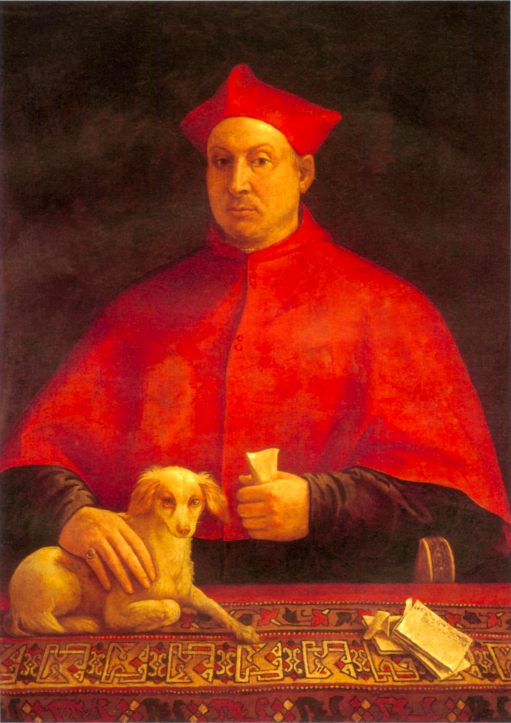
Cardinal Pompeo Colonna

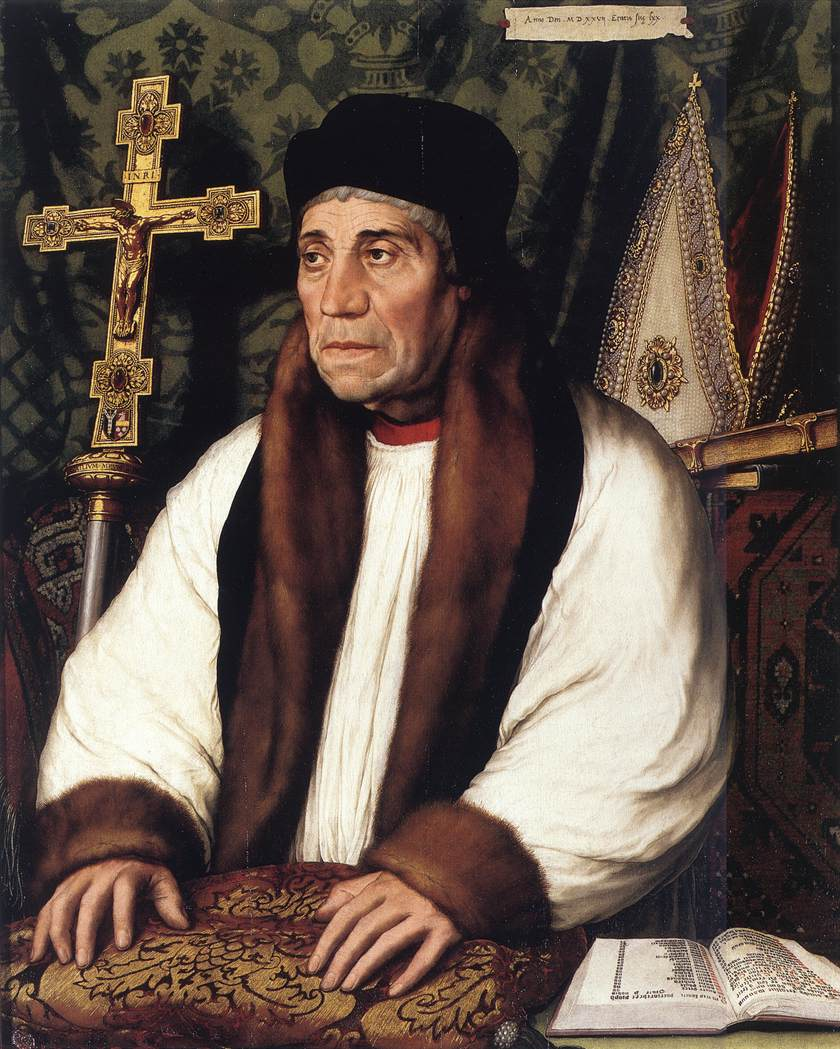
Reverend William Warham

- May – Elizabeth Stafford, Countess of Sussex
- June – Bernardino Luini, Italian painter (b. 1482)
- June 28 – Pompeo Colonna, Italian Roman Catholic cardinal (b. 1479)
- July 8 – Andrea Riccio, Italian sculptor and architect (b. 1470)
- August 11 – John of Denmark, Danish prince (b. 1518)
- August 16 – John, Elector of Saxony (b. 1468)
- August 19 – Caritas Pirckheimer, German nun (b. 1467)
- August 22 – William Warham, Archbishop of Canterbury (b. 1450)
- September – Vlad VI Înecatul, Prince of Wallachia
- October 1 – Jan Mabuse, Flemish painter
- December 2 – Louis Gonzaga (Rodomonte), Italian-French dignitary and diplomat (b. 1500)
- December 3 – Louis II, Count Palatine of Zweibrücken, Duke of Zweibrücken from 1514 to 1532 (b. 1502)
- December 12 – Pietro Accolti, Italian Catholic cardinal (b. 1455)
- December 13 – Solomon Molcho, Portuguese mystic (b. 1500)
- December 30 – Krzysztof Szydłowiecki, Polish noble (b. 1467)
- date unknown
  - Jeanne de la Font, French poet and culture patron (b. 1500)
  - Huáscar, 12th Inca Emperor
