= Aurelia Accame Bobbio =

Italian literary historian (1911–1999)

Aurelia Accame Bobbio (31 January 1911, in Rome – 7 September 1999, in Frascati) was an Italian literary historian. Considered a scholar on the works of Alessandro Manzoni, she is best remembered for her numerous contributions to the Enciclopedia Dantesca. A graduate of the Sapienza University of Rome alongside Vittorio Rossi, she was a member of the Italian Catholic Federation of University Students, and served as chair of Italian Literature at the Sapienza University of Rome in 1970, succeeding Umberto Bosco. She was a cousin of Norberto Bobbio, and married to Silvio Accame.

== Biography ==
Born into a Piedmontese family (she was Norberto Bobbio cousin), she moved to Rome when her father took up a post at the Ministry of Justice (Italy). She graduated from Sapienza University of Rome in 1933 with Vittorio Rossi (philologist). Raised in the anti-fascist cultural environment of Piedmont, in Rome she became involved in Catholic anti-fascism, joining the Italian Catholic Federation of University Students and the editorial staff of the magazine “Studium” and participating in political struggles during the Nazi occupation of Rome. In 1948, she married Silvio Accame. After teaching in high schools for many years, in 1970 he was appointed professor of Italian Literature in the Faculty of Education at the University of Rome, succeeding Umberto Bosco. A scholar of Italian literature in all its forms, with a particular focus on Alessandro Manzoni, for whom she edited several school editions, she published numerous entries in the Enciclopedia Dantesca (Dante Encyclopedia).
