= Diomede Borghesi =

Italian philologist (1540 – 1598)

- Born: 1540; Siena, Republic of Siena
- Died: 28 January 1598 (aged 57–58); Siena, Grand Duchy of Tuscany
- Occupations: Philologist; University teacher; Linguist

Academic background
- Influences: Dante Alighieri; Petrarch; Pietro Bembo; Claudio Tolomei; Lodovico Castelvetro

Academic work
- Era: Late Renaissance
- Discipline: Italian studies
- Institutions: University of Siena
- Influenced: Celso Cittadini

Diomede Borghesi (1540 – 28 January 1598) was an Italian poet and orator, critic and philologist. He published several volumes of poems and of letters.

== Biography ==
Diomede Borghesi was born in Siena around 1540. He was a pupil of Lodovico Meneghini, professor at the local university. He was banished in his youth from his native city and confined for two years to Portoferraio on the island of Elba. He managed to escape to Mantua and lived there until 1564 under the protection of Cardinal Federico Gonzaga.

After the cardinal's death, he moved to Padua, and completed there his literary apprenticeship under Sperone Speroni, Francesco Piccolomini and Scipione Gonzaga. Although Borghesi had established his home in Padua, he nevertheless did not cease to roam through Italy. Between 1564 and 1587 he visited Venice, Bergamo, Verona, Rome, Viterbo, Perugia, Siena, Florence, Bologna, Ferrara, Reggio Emilia, Correggio, and Turin, where he became particularly known as a poet, composing various occasional poems for Charles Emmanuel I, Duke of Savoy. Between 1566 and 1585 he published five volumes of Rime and two volumes of Lettere. The first volume of his Lettere discorsive nelle quali in diverse opportune occasioni si danno utilissimi ammaestramenti intorno al regolato e leggiadro scriuer toscano, was published in Padua in 1584. A second volume followed during the same year in Venice, and a third one appeared in Siena in 1603. Besides these letters, of which there is also a Rome edition of 1701, Borghesi published some Lettere famigliari, the first volume of which bears the Padua imprint and the date 1578.

In 1588 Borghesi entered the service of Ferdinando I de' Medici, Grand Duke of Tuscany. In 1589 Ferdinando established a chair of Italian language in Siena University and Borghesi became the first holder of it. This chair, the first vernacular language professorship in Europe, was especially created to teach Italian to the many German students present in Siena at that time.

“His lecture notes, which are now in the Siena library and his tenure of the chair have been described by Rossi in his paper on the Tuscan language chair. There are also two inaugural lectures by him delivered in connection with his academic duties [published respectively in 1589 and 1590], to which may be added an Oratione intorno agli onori della poesia e della eloquenza, printed in Siena in 1596. Most of Borghesi's extant philological works were written by him in epistolary form, and appear to have enjoyed some degree of popularity”.

From then on until his death on January 28, 1598, he lived in Siena, completely devoting himself to the study of grammar and language. Bulgarini belonged to the Sienese School of philologists. He was a close friend of his fellow-countrymen Adriano Politi and Scipione Bargagli. He was a member of the Accademia degli Svegliati and of the Accademia degli Intronati.

== Works ==
- Rime, libro primo, Padua, 1566, in-8°; secondo libro, ibid., 1567, in-8°; terzo volume, ibid., 1568, in-8°; quarto volume, Perugia, 1570, in-8°; quinto volume, Viterbo, 1571, in-8°.
- Lettere famigliari. Padua: Lorenzo Pasquati. 1578.
- Lettere discorsive, prima parte, Padua, 1584, in-4°; seconda parte, Venice, 1584, in-4°; terza parte, Siena, 1603, in-4°.

== Bibliography ==
- Ghilini, Girolamo (1647). Teatro d'huomini letterati. Vol. II. Venice. pp. 67–68.
- Crescimbeni, Giovanni Mario (1730). Istoria della volgar poesia. Vol. IV. Venice. p. 112.
- Quadrio, Francesco Saverio, Della storia e della ragione d'ogni poesia, II, Milano 1741, p. 254; IV, ibid. 1743, p. 260.
- Mazzuchelli, Giammaria (1762). "BORGHESI (Diomede)". Gli scrittori d'Italia, cioè Notizie storiche e critiche intorno alle vite e agli scritti dei letterati italiani (in Italian). Vol. II, part 3. Brescia: Giambatista Bossini. pp. 1721–1726.
- Beccaria, Gian Luigi (1970). "BORGHESI, Diomede". Dizionario Biografico degli Italiani (in Italian). Vol. 12: Bonfadini–Borrello. Rome: Istituto dell'Enciclopedia Italiana. pp. 643–646. ISBN 978-88-12-00032-6.
