= Adriano Politi =

Italian translator and philologist

- Born: 1542; San Quirico d'Orcia, Republic of Siena
- Died: 15 January 1625 (aged 82–83); Sarteano, Grand Duchy of Tuscany
- Burial place: Basilica of San Francesco, Siena
- Occupations: Translator; Philologist; Classical scholar
- Known for: Translation of the works of Tacitus; Dittionario toscano
- Parent(s): Marc’Antonio Politi and Virginia Politi (née Cerina)

Academic background
- Influences: Claudio Tolomei

Academic work
- Era: Renaissance
- Discipline: Classics, Italian studies
- Influenced: Girolamo Gigli

Adriano Politi (1542 – 15 January 1625) was an Italian translator, philologist and classical scholar. He belonged to the Sienese School of philologists.

== Biography ==
Adriano Politi was born at San Quirico d'Orcia in 1542. He chose the ecclesiastical career, and was attached as secretary to the cardinals Capizucchi, Serbelloni, Cornaro and Aldobrandini. He was a close friend of his fellow-countrymen Diomede Borghesi and Scipione Bargagli and a member of the Accademia degli Accesi, instituted by Bellisario Bulgarini in his home in Siena in 1558. Politi died in Sarteano in January 1625.

== Works ==
Adriano Politi is best known today for his Italian translation of Tacitus (Opere di C. Tacito, Rome, 1604 and 1611; a revised and improved edition of Politi's translation was published in Venice in 1644). Politi's translation was reissued in the luxurious edition of Tacitus's complete works, edited by Girolamo Canini d'Anghiari. Published in 1618 by Giunti and Ciotti, this new edition of Politi's translation was hugely successful despite being a complex and expensive work. When he reprinted it just two years later the printer Giunti noted that in only a few months it had sold 1,200 copies but demand outstripped the supply. The edition was reissued three times during the first half of the century (1620, 1628, and 1641).

Politi is also known for his Dittionario toscano, published in 1613–14, and for his place in the Questione della lingua. A defender of the Sienese dialect, he followed Claudio Tolomei's lead in rejecting Florentine exclusivity and, in opposition to the thesis of Pietro Bembo and Lionardo Salviati, he gave preference to the spoken language over the literary one. His Dittionario, an abridgment of the Vocabolario degli Accademici della Crusca, added Sienese equivalents to some of the Vocabolario's distinctively Florentine lexical items. Among his other notable works is the Ordo Romanæ historiæ legendæ (Venice, 1627, and in vol. 3 of Gaudenzio Roberti's Miscellanea Italica erudita).

== Bibliography ==
- Diffley, P. (2002). "Politi, Adriano". The Oxford Companion to Italian Literature. Oxford University Press.
- Bartera, Salvador (2015). "Tacitus in Italy". Hermathena (199): 159–196. JSTOR 26921697.
- Bianchi De Vecchi, Paola (1969–1970). "Adriano Politi e il suo "Dittionario Toscano"". Annali della Facoltà di lettere e filosofia della Università degli Studi di Perugia. 7: 181–345.
- This article incorporates public domain material from McClintock, John; Strong, James (1867–1887). Cyclopædia of Biblical, Theological and Ecclesiastical Literature. Harper and Brothers. This entry cites:
  - Ferdinand Hoefer, Nouvelle Biographie Générale, 40, 616.
- Riga, Pietro Giulio (2015). "POLITI, Adriano". Dizionario Biografico degli Italiani (in Italian). Vol. 84: Piovene–Ponzo. Rome: Istituto dell'Enciclopedia Italiana. ISBN 978-88-12-00032-6.
