= Marta Sordi =

Italian historian (1925–2009)

Marta Sordi (18 November 1925, in Livorno – 5 April 2009, in Milan) was an Italian historian of classical antiquity, best remembered for her various publications on Greek and Roman history. A graduate of the University of Milan, she was an assistant to Silvio Accame and taught at the University of Messina (1962), the University of Bologna (1967) and the Università Cattolica del Sacro Cuore (1969). Here she was full professor of Greek History and Roman History until 2001 and headed the Institute of Ancient History at the Faculty of Arts and Humanities.

Sordi was also a member of the Istituto Lombardo Accademia di Scienze e Lettere, the Pontifical Academy of Archaeology, and the Istituto Nazionale di Studi Etruschi ed Italici.

She was awarded a Medal of the City of Paris in 1997, and a Rosa Camuna from the regional council of Lombardy in 2002.

She showed that the Emperor Domitian launched the first persecution of Christians, following his break with Titus Flavius Clemens. She also stated that this persecution was not characterised by the banning of Christians from public life or by the systematic nature that was instead a feature of the persecution under Nero and his Institutum Neronianum.

== Works ==
- Sordi, Marta,The Christians and the Roman empire / translated by Annabel Bedini.London : Croom Helm, 1986, 215 p. ; 22 cm. ISBN 0709944217
