= Language Question =

Language Question can refer to several linguistic and/or political debates, including:

- Finnish language question
- Greek language question
- Language Question (Italy)
- Language Question (Malta)
- Language Question (Ragusa)
