= Scipione Bargagli =

Italian Renaissance scholar

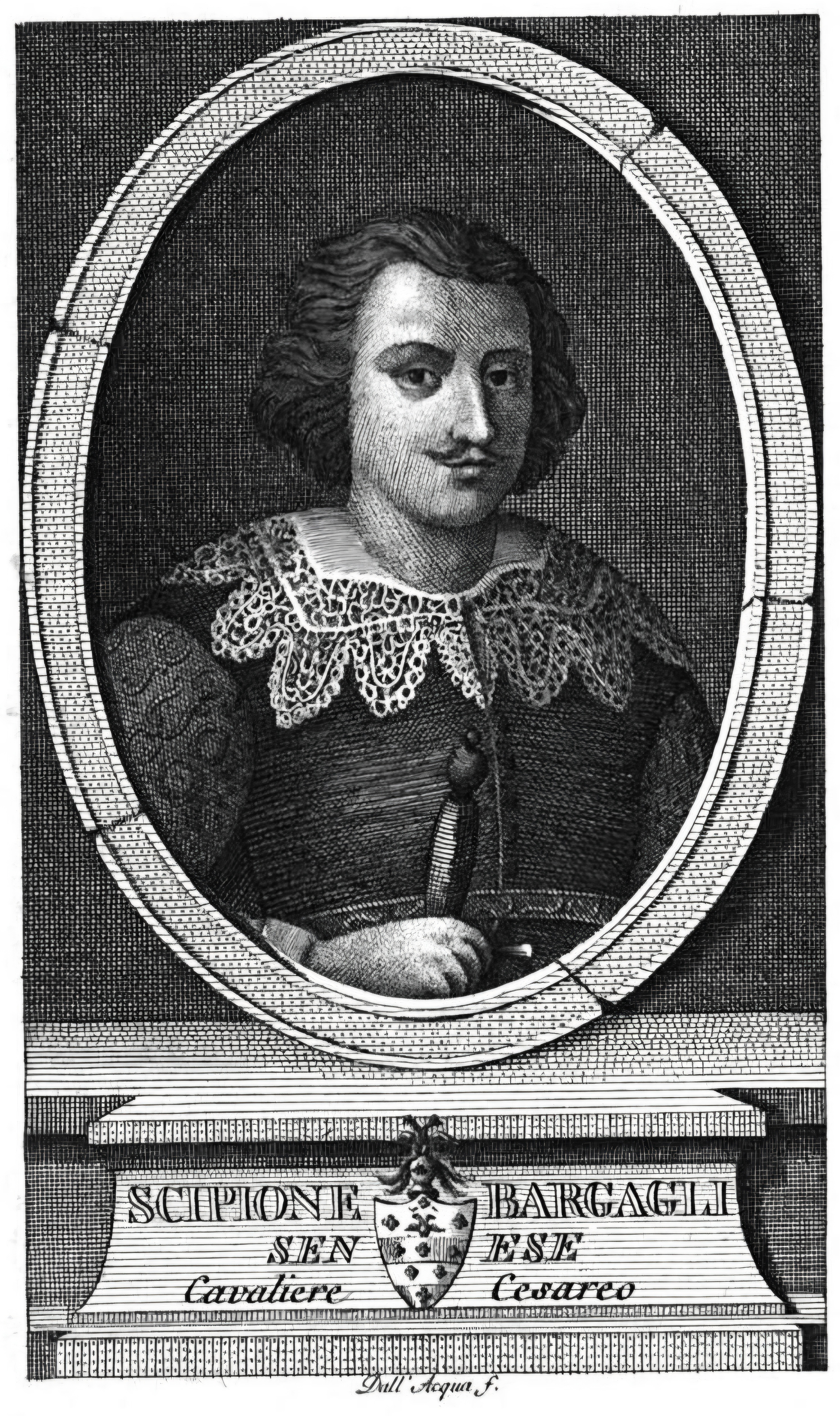
- Engraved portrait of Scipione Bargagli by Cristoforo Dall'Acqua. From Novelle di autori senesi, Milan, Silvestri, 1815
- Born: 1540; Siena, Republic of Siena
- Died: 27 October 1612 (aged 71–72); Siena, Grand Duchy of Tuscany
- Occupations: Philologist; Writer; Linguist
- Spouse: Violante di Pandolfo Savini
- Children: 4
- Parent(s): Giulio Bargagli and Ortensia Bargagli (née Ugurgieri)

Academic background
- Influences: Claudio Tolomei

Academic work
- Era: Late Renaissance
- Discipline: Italian studies
- Influenced: Celso Cittadini

Scipione Bargagli (1540 – 27 October 1612) was a Sienese philologist, academician and scholar. He belonged to the Sienese School of philologists.

== Biography ==
Scipione Bargagli was born in Siena in 1540, but we have no details regarding the day and month; he was the son of Giulio and Ortensia Ugurgieri. His brother, Girolamo Bargagli, is the author of the famous play The Pilgrim Woman.

Bargagli was a prominent member of the celebrated Accademia degli Intronati of Siena. He pursued inquiries into literary matters in correspondence with his close friends Bellisario Bulgarini, Diomede Borghesi and Adriano Politi.

His best-known works are I trattenimenti (Venice, 1587), a collection of novels set in his native Siena modeled on Giovanni Boccaccio's Decameron, and Delle imprese (Siena, 1578), a study of emblems, combining theory with (illustrated) examples. The first part was first published in 1578 and republished in 1589, while the second and third parts were published in 1594. It is presents as a dialogue between Scipione himself, Belisario Bulgarini and Ippolito Agostino, who engage with other theorists such as Girolamo Ruscelli and Paolo Giovio.

Bargagli's translation of George Buchanan's spiritual tragedy Jephthes, sive Votum, published in Lucca in 1587, occasioned him some trouble with the Inquisition.

Bargagli participated in the polemics over the Italian language as a defender of the Sienese dialect. Il Turamino (1602) describes the Sienese variety of Tuscan and justifies its literary use, rejecting Florentine exclusivity advocated by the Accademia della Crusca.

== Works ==
- Delle lodi dell'Academie: oratione di Scipion Bargagli da lui recitata nell'Academia degli Accesi in Siena. Florence: Luca Bonetti. 1569.
- I Trattenimenti, dove da vaghe donne e giovani uomini rappresentati sono onesti e dilettevoli giuochi, narrate novelle, e cantate alcune amorose canzonette. Venice: Bernardo Giunti. 1587.
- I Rovesci delle medaglie. Siena: pel Florimi. 1599.
- Iefte ovver Voto, Tragedia Recata di Latino in Vulgare. Lucca: Vicenzo Busdraghi. 1587.
- Il Turamino, ovvero del parlare e dello scrivere sanese. Siena: Matteo Florimi. 1602.

== Bibliography ==
- Borsellino, Nino (1964). "BARGAGLI, Scipione". Dizionario Biografico degli Italiani (in Italian). Vol. 6: Baratteri–Bartolozzi. Rome: Istituto dell'Enciclopedia Italiana. pp. 343–346. OCLC 883370.
- Richardson, B. (2002). "Bargagli, Scipione". The Oxford Companion to Italian Literature. Oxford University Press.
- McClure, George (2013). "The Games of Girolamo and Scipione Bargagli (1563–1569)". Parlour Games and the Public Life of Women in Renaissance Italy. University of Toronto Press: 55–80. ISBN 9781442666139. JSTOR 10.3138/j.ctt5hjvcg.7.
