= Girolamo Gigli =

Italian writer, playwright, and scholar (1660–1722)

- Girolamo Gigli
- Born: Girolamo Nenci; October 14, 1660; Siena, Grand Duchy of Tuscany
- Died: 4 January 1722 (aged 61); Rome, Papal States
- Other name: Amaranto Sciaditico
- Occupations: Philologist, dramaturge, poet, librettist
- Spouse: Laurenza Perfetti
- Children: 12
- Parent(s): Giuseppe Nenci and Pietra Nenci (née Fazoni)

Academic background
- Education: University of Siena
- Influences: Petrarch; Catherine of Siena; Scipione Bargagli; Diomede Borghesi; Celso Cittadini; Molière; Jean Racine

Academic work
- Era: Neoclassicism
- Discipline: Italian studies
- Institutions: University of Siena
- Influenced: Carlo Goldoni

Girolamo Gigli (or Gerolamo; 14 October 1660 – 4 January 1722) was an Italian writer, playwright, and scholar.

== Biography ==
Born in Siena to the Nenci family, he was adopted by an uncle, from whom he took the surname, Gigli. He married young to Laurenzia Perfetti, with whom he had twelve children. In 1698, he taught at the University of Pavia and later in the University of Siena, as Tuscan professor of literature. He was a regular visitor to the Accademia degli Intronati (he also became secretary), where he was nicknamed "L'Economico" ("The Budget").

== Works ==
Gigli adapted French comedy with a lively and spontaneous humor. For example, Il Don Pilone, ovvero il bacchettone falso (1711) is an adaptation of Tartuffe by Molière. Here, Gigli uses the language of Siena to make a witty satire of personalities of the era. In La sorellina di don Pilone (1712), Gigli teases his own family, especially his wife. The same year Gigli wrote Il Gazzettino e Avvisi ideali, mocking characters related to the academic, religious, and courtly worlds.

In addition to plays, he also wrote some forty musical compositions. Gigli also engaged in historical research and linguistic diversity. His most notable historical work is the Diario Senese (or Sanese), a two-volume work published posthumously in 1723 by his son Ludwig. In the Diario, Gigli collected "outstanding things sacred and profane that would illustrate the annals of Siena", ordered day-to-day; therefore containing much historical information from previous centuries concerning the customs, traditions, and institutions of Siena.

In 1717, he published all the writings of St. Catherine of Siena, but in farcical and funny language: the so-called Vocabolario Cateriniano. This questioning of the Florentine language, in addition to its opinion concerning the superiority of Florence over Siena, helped give rise to the controversy with the Accademia della Crusca, from which he was expelled. Gigli never disavowed his views of language, and was therefore sent into exile, under pressure from the same Accademia della Crusca. His Vocabolario Cateriniano was burned at Florence in Piazza Sant Apollinare, on 9 September 1717. Gigli then had to move, first to Viterbo and then to Rome, before returning to Siena in the final period of his life. However, due to his economic and social disgrace, he decided to return to Rome, where he died in 1722.

Before his death, his commentary on Celso Cittadini's work on Vulgar Latin and the Tuscan dialect was published in 1721.

In recent years, the Accademia della Crusca has decided to republish Gigli's Vocabulario Cateriniano.

In 1707, it was published in Siena with a dedication to the Grand Duke Cosimo III "The life of the seraphic bride of Jesus Christ St. Catherine of Siena, now faithfully translated from the Latin Legend who compiled the B. Raymond of Capua, her confessor for Mr. Canon Bernardino Pecci Academic Enthroned".

== Sources ==
- Falorni, Marco (1982). Edizioni Periccioli (ed.). Senesi da ricordare: brevi cenni sulla biografia e le opere dei principali personaggi storici senesi dalle origini ai giorni nostri. Siena.
- Spera, Lucinda (2000). "GIGLI, Girolamo". Dizionario Biografico degli Italiani (in Italian). Vol. 54: Ghiselli–Gimma. Rome: Istituto dell'Enciclopedia Italiana. ISBN 978-88-12-00032-6.
