= Lodovico Castelvetro =

Italian philosopher and literary theorist (c.1505–1556)

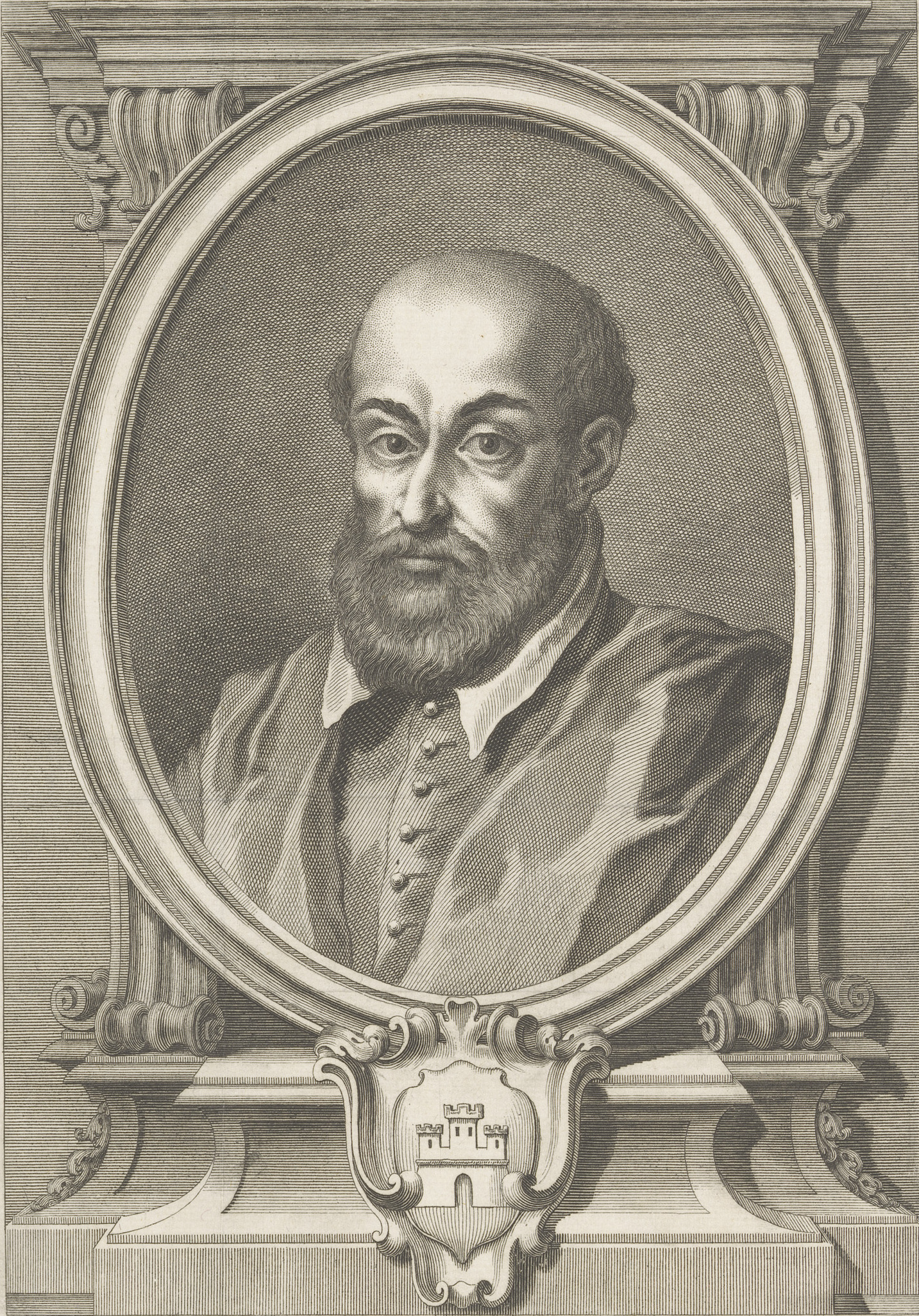
- Lodovico Castelvetro
- Born: 1505; Modena, Duchy of Modena
- Died: 23 March 1556 (aged 50–51); Chiavenna, Three Leagues
- Occupations: Philosopher; University teacher; Linguist; Literary theorist
- Parent(s): Giacomo Castelvetro and Bartolomea Castelvetro (née Della Porta)

Academic background
- Education: University of Siena
- Influences: Plato; Aristotle; Erasmus; Dante Alighieri; Petrarch; Bembo

Academic work
- Era: Renaissance
- Discipline: Italian studies, Literary theory
- Institutions: University of Modena
- Influenced: Cittadini; Beni; Tesauro

Lodovico Castelvetro (c. 1505 – 23 March 1556) was an important figure in the development of neo-classicism, especially in drama. It was his reading of Aristotle that led to a widespread adoption of a tight version of the Three Unities, as a dramatic standard. Castelvetro was born in Modena, Italy, and died in Chiavenna.

== Biography ==
Castelvetro was born into a noble family of Modena. He was carefully educated, attended the universities of Bologna, Ferrara, Padua, and Siena - in that order - and to please his father took the degree of Doctor of Laws at Siena. Poor health compelled him to retire to Modena, where he became an active encourager of literature. In 1553 began his bitter quarrel with Annibale Caro, arising out of Castelvetro's criticism of Caro's canzone: Venite a l'ombra de gran gigli d'oro; in the course of this controversy each was charged with attempting to get the other murdered.

The Roman inquisition became a force in Modena during the papacy of Pope Paul IV, who opposed the softer policy exercised by Bishop Foscarari and his patron, Cardinal Giovanni Morone. Foscarari had not favored the persecution of individuals like Agostino Gadaldino, Bonifacio and Filippo Valentini and Castelvetro. Already in 1542 Castelvetro, with the rest of the Academy of Modena, had been obliged to sign a formulary protesting orthodoxy in matters of faith. In 1557 the persecution was renewed. Castelvetro is thought to have taken refuge in Ferrarese territory. At any rate he soon appeared at Rome for the purpose of clearing himself. He was specifically charged with having translated a work of Melanchthon. After several examinations, learning that the decision was likely not to favor him, he made his escape from detention, and by night fled from Rome.

He found a haven at Chiavenna. Together with his brother Giovanni Maria, who thus suffered for aiding his escape, Castelvetro was condemned and excommunicated as a hardened heretic (1561). Later he applied for permission to present himself to the Council of Trent for justification; the pope required him to come to Rome. Instead Castelvetro withdrew to Lyon. He was now busy with his Commentary on Aristotle's Poetics. At Lyon he was persecuted; his house was set on fire, on which occasion the scholar was only heard to cry: 'Save my Poetics!' He was obliged to leave Lyon. He went to Geneva, and then followed his brother to the Court of Maximilian II. The plague soon drove him from Vienna; and he returned to Chiavenna, where he died.

== Works ==
His Poetica d'Aristotele vulgarizzata e sposta ("The Poetics of Aristotle translated in the Vulgar Language and commented on") was called the most famous Italian Renaissance commentary on Aristotle's Poetics. His Giunta, a commentary on the Prose della volgar lingua by Pietro Bembo, is one of the earlier texts on Italian grammar, and linguistics in general; his contemporaries objected to him that his theories were a little too philosophical for their time. After Castelvetro's Poetics (Vienna, 1570) his best-known work is a commentary on the Italian poems of Petrarch: Le Rime del Petrarca brevemente sposte, Basel, 1582.

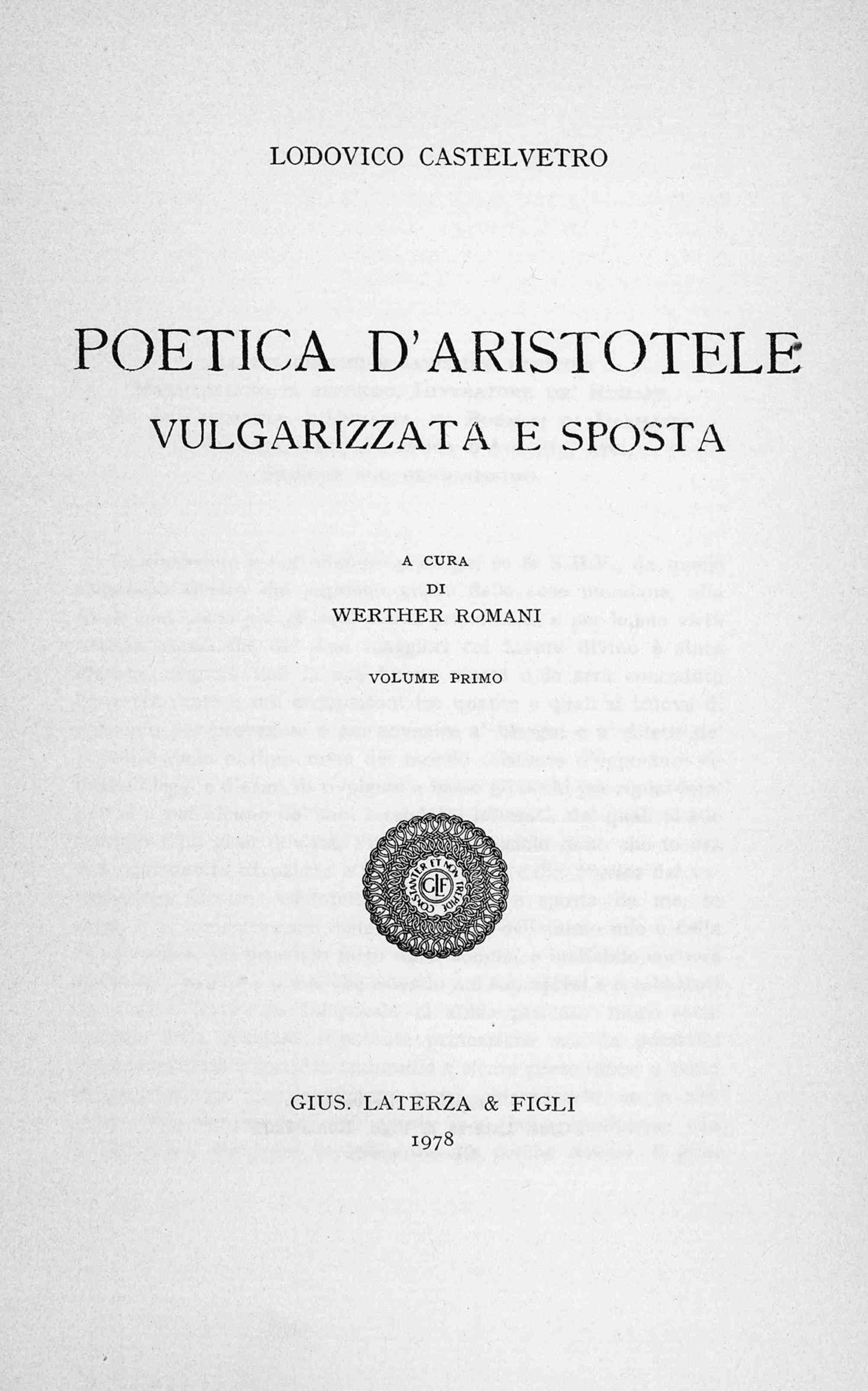
Poetica d'Aristotele

== Bibliography ==
- Marchetti, Valerio (1979). "CASTELVETRO, Ludovico". Dizionario Biografico degli Italiani (in Italian). Vol. 22: Castelvetro–Cavallotti. Rome: Istituto dell'Enciclopedia Italiana. ISBN 978-88-12-00032-6.
- Andrew Bongiorno (editor and translator), Castelvetro on the Art of Poetry (1984).
- Richardson, B. (2002). "Castelvetro, Ludovico". The Oxford Companion to Italian Literature. Oxford University Press.
- Jossa, Stefano (2014). "Ludovico Castelvetro between Humanism and Heresy". In F. De Donno; S. Gilson (eds.). Beyond Catholicism: Heresy, Mysticism, and Apocalypse in Italian Culture. New York: Palgrave/Macmillan. pp. 77–103. ISBN 978-1137342027.
