= Paolo Beni =

Italian scholar (1553–1625)

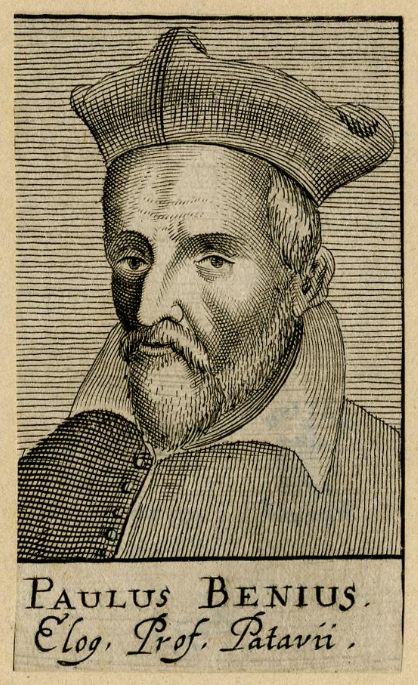
Portrait of Beni for Paul Freher's Theatrum virorum eruditione clarorum (Nuremberg, 1688)

Paolo Beni (1553–1625) was an Italian humanist, literary theorist, theologian and philosopher.

Beni received a doctorate in theology in 1576. He joined the Society of Jesus in 1581, but was expelled from the order in 1593. He lectured at the University of Rome from 1594 to 1599 and was a professor at the University of Padua from 1600 until 1623. Beni was on poor terms with his family and was frequently involved in controversy. Nevertheless, he was a prolific writer, publishing almost a book a year on top of numerous unpublished works.

== Life ==
=== Family and education ===
Paolo Beni was born in Gubbio, probably on 10 January 1553. He often used the sobriquet Eugubinus ('from Gubbio'). He was descended on both sides from the local nobility of long standing. His mother, Modesta, belonged to the Panfili, a family first attested in Gubbio in 1114. His father, Francesco, belonged to the Beni, first attested in Gubbio in 1049. Beni had five siblings, two sisters (Theodora and Eleonora) and three brothers (Giacomo, the eldest; Federico; and Giulio).

Beni began his education alongside his brother Giacomo under Timocrate Aloigi. After he had learned to read and write, he was sent to Rome to board and study at the Collegium Germanicum under the Jesuits. Sometime before 1566, his father sent him to the University of Perugia to study civil law. By 1566, however, he had gotten permission to study philosophy and theology at the University of Bologna. He fell seriously ill in 1572 or 1573 before moving on to the University of Padua in 1573, where he studied theology under Girolamo Quaino. In 1574, he joined the Accademia degli Animosi, where he met and befriended Torquato Tasso, whom he first heard speaking in the Accademia degli Infiammati.

=== Between Rome and the Jesuits ===
By March 1576, Beni had received his doctorate in theology from Padua. In March or April, he was offered a lectureship, which he declined because of an outbreak of plague. He travelled first to Bologna, then to Gubbio and on to Rome before the end of the year. He worked as a poet and secretary for Cardinal Cristoforo Madruzzo in 1576–1578 and in a similar capacity for Marc-Antoine Muret in 1577–1578. Around this time he met the humanist Carlo Sigonio. On 20 March 1578, Pope Gregory XIII named him a miles pius (pious knight), an office in an unknown military order which his father had purchased for him. He retained an income from it for the rest of his life. From 1579 to 1581, he was in the service of Francesco Maria II, Duke of Urbino.

Beni entered the Jesuit order as a novice over the objections of his father on 4 May 1581 at Sant'Andrea al Quirinale. By the end of 1584, he was teaching at the Roman College. His father died in 1586, leaving Paolo only the knighthood. In the event, his brothers agreed to pay him an annuity. In 1586–1587, Beni was transferred to the Venetian province. In 1587, he returned to Rome briefly before being transferred again. He was in Padua in 1590 before being transferred to Milan, where he gave lectures on the classics. While there, he fell ill and made out a will, with the permission of the General of the Order, Claudio Acquaviva.

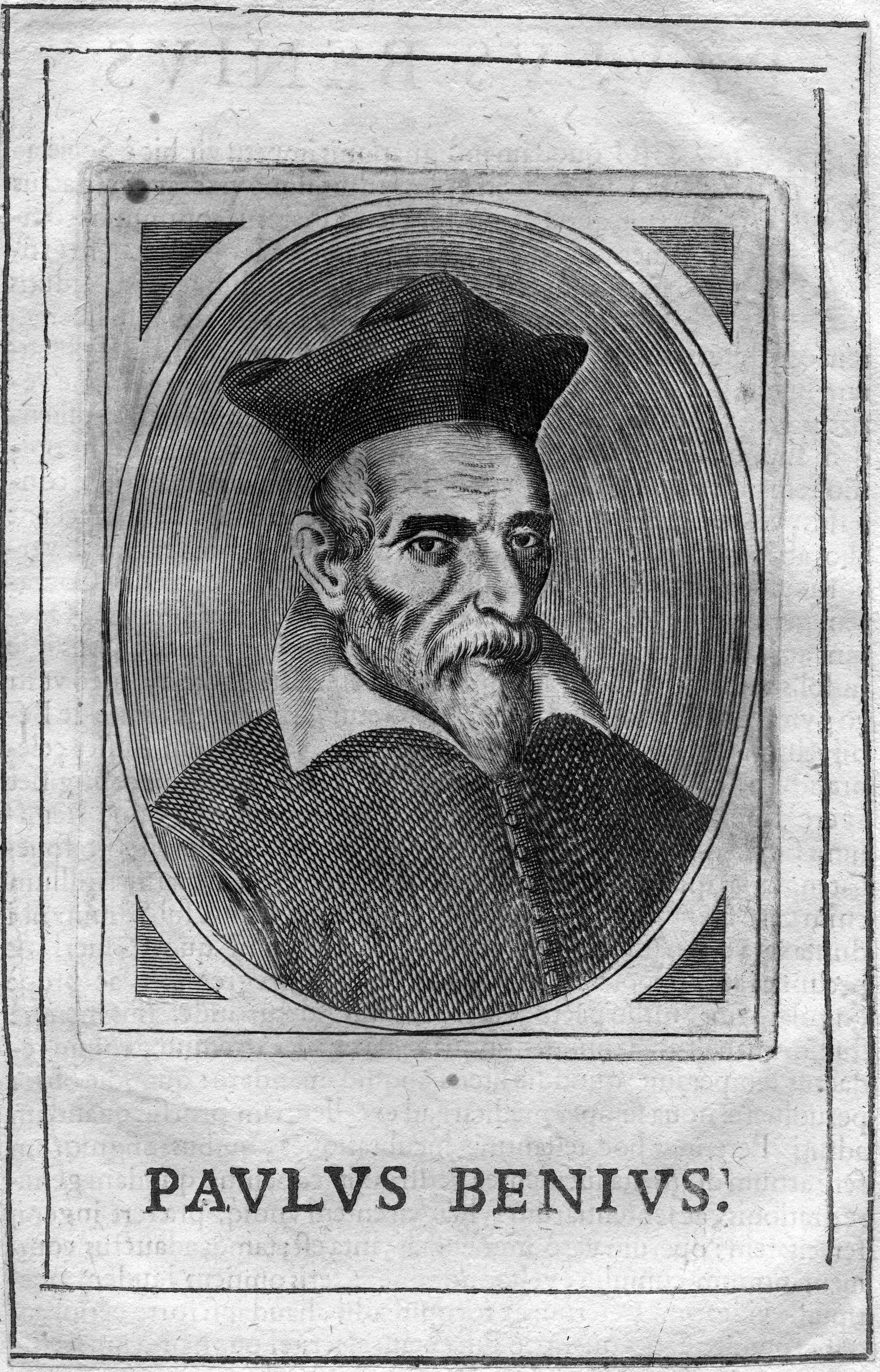
Beni depicted in Giovanni Imperiali's Musaeum historicum et physicum (Venice, 1640)

In February 1593, Beni went from Milan to Gubbio without permission. Without the knowledge of his superiors, he attempted to coerce his brothers Giacomo and Giulio to finance Jesuit colleges in Gubbio and Pesaro. He even entered into negotiations for this purpose with the bishop of Pesaro. Acquaviva intervened to put a stop to his schemes and on 23 September 1593 he was expelled from the order. After his expulsion, Pope Clement VIII offered him a lectureship on Aristotle at the Sapienza University of Rome. He began in 1593 or 1594. In 1594, Beni delivered the traditional Ash Wednesday sermon in the church of Santa Sabina before the pope and the assembled cardinals.

=== Paduan professor ===
On 3 November 1599, Beni accepted the chair of humanities at the University of Padua, which had been vacant since the death of Antonio Riccoboni. He began his final lecture series in Rome the next day and moved to Padua in early 1600. On 12 March 1600, Beni was admitted to the Accademia dei Ricovrati, a learned society founded the previous November. On 16 March, he gave his inaugural lecture. The chair of humanities covered rhetoric, poetry and history. Although he was elected several times to the office of censore of the Ricovrati, he ceased to be an active member after December 1601. His break with the Ricovrati may have owed something to his intervention in the controversy over Molinism with the publication of his Qua tandem in 1603. This work caused a break with Clement VIII and ended Beni's interest in theology.

From 1606, Beni shared his lecturing duties with Vincenzo Contarini. He was an "unrelievedly serious" lecturer and, by some accounts, less popular than Contarini. In 1607, his brother Giacomo urged him to return to the service of the Duke of Urbino, but he refused. In 1611, he bought a sepulchre in the (now demolished) church of Santa Chiara in Padua. In late 1612, Beni published the Anticrusca, a critique of the Florentine Vocabolario degli Accademici della Crusca. This provoked public controversy. In 1613, he dedicated his Cavalcanti to Grand Duke Cosimo II of Tuscany, but the latter forbade its publication. In October 1614, Beni travelled to Venice to plead for its publication. The work was published, but the grand duke rejected the dedication. The controversy may have shaken Beni's confidence, for he did not publish anything between 1614 and 1620.

On 15 July 1616, Beni wrote to his nephew Francesco in advance of his marriage, advising him on the importance of health and asking for money. His correspondence with Francesco continued until 21 February 1625. He was constantly asking for money. On 1 October 1621, he made a will, leaving his money to the three sons of his deceased brother Federico. If these nephews predeceased him, it was to be distributed to the poor of Gubbio. He left to his furniture, wines, carriages and horses to his housekeeper, Prudenza dei Bianchi. His library he bequeathed to the Zoccolanti of San Francesco in Padua.

=== Final years and death ===
By February 1623, Beni's nephew Felice, son of Federico, had moved in with him. In August, he wrote to Pope Urban VIII congratulating him on his election. He went into a temporary retirement at some point, but he was lecturing again in November 1623. Around that time, he agreed to transfer his knighthood to one of Francesco's sons if Francesco agreed to compensate Federico's sons. In January 1624, Felice abandoned Beni while on a mission to Rome and absconded with a prostitute. Beni's health declined thereafter. On 25 July, he was seriously ill. He recovered, but by 24 January 1625 he was too frail even to read. In a letter to Francesco that day, he asked that all his unpublished works be printed posthumously, possibly in Germany if it were profitable. By 30 January, he had reconciled with his brother Giacomo.

Before he died, Beni gave his library to the Theatines. He was still living on 1 August 1625, the date of the dedication to Urban VIII of his commentary on Tasso's Gerusalemme liberata. He probably died not long after. He was buried in the garb of a priest.

== Works ==
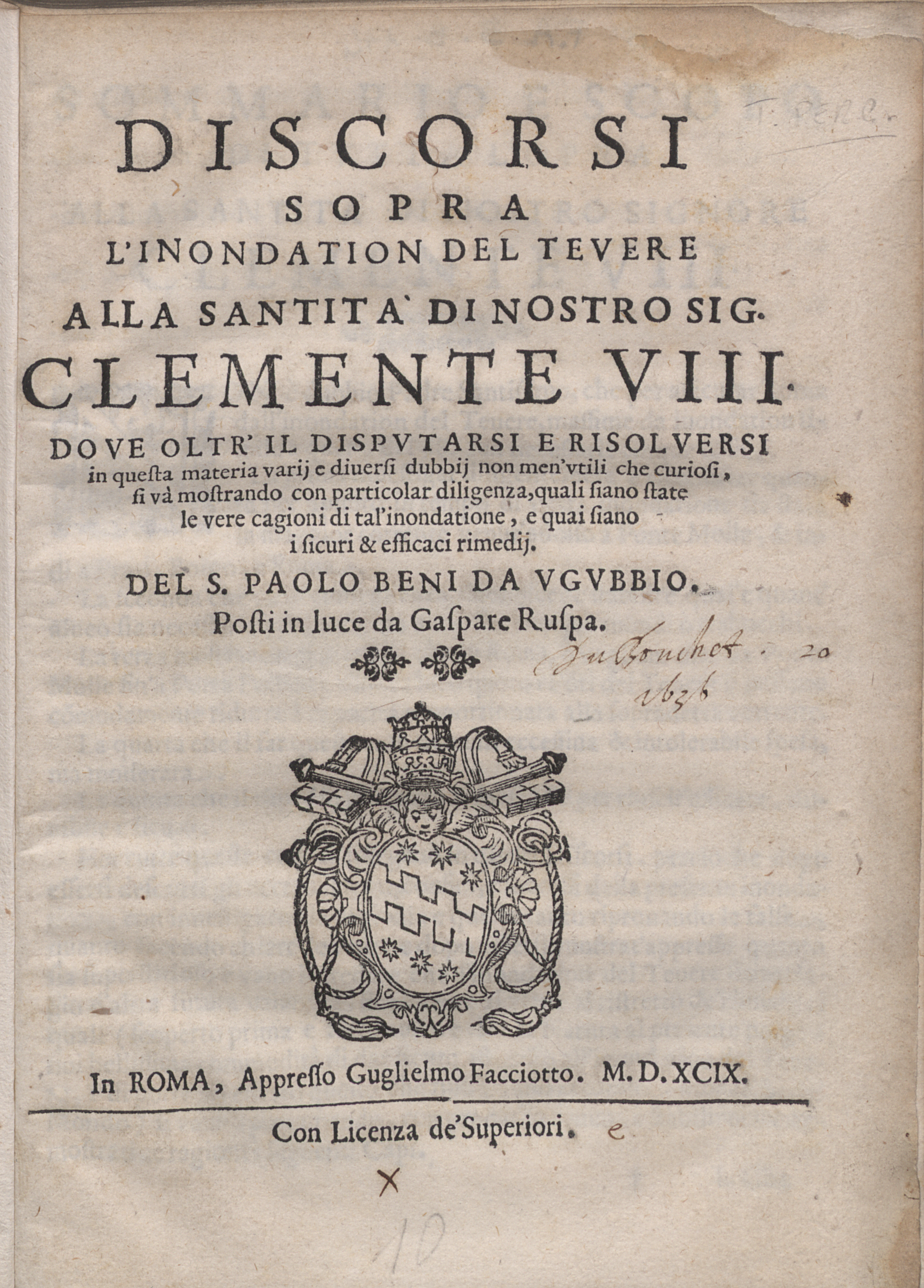
Titlepage of the Discorsi sopra l'inondazione del Tevere (Rome, 1599)

Beni was a prolific writer, with many of works still unpublished.

Beni contributed six poems to the anthology Panegirico nel felice dottorato dell'illustre, et eccellentissimo signor Gioseppe Spinelli, dignissimo rettor de legisti, et cavalier splendidissimo, published at Padua in 1575 in honour of Giuseppe Spinelli's doctorate. His contributions are the most ambitious in the collectiong, including a lengthy canzone. His style is rigidly Petrarchian.

Beni's commentary on Plato's Timaeus, In Timaeum Platonis sive in naturalem atque divinam Platonis et Aristotelis Philosophiam decades tres, was published in three parts ('decades'). It attempted to resurrect Plato's original meaning from beneath layers of Neoplatonic interpretation. The Commentarii in Aristotelem poeticam (Padua, 1613) is a commentary on Aristotle's Poetics. It has been described as the last such commentary in a long tradition.

In Padua, Beni was involved in the Quarrel of the Ancients and the Moderns. He was a modern.

Beni wrote a treatise on printing, Modo di riformare e ridurre a perfettion l'arte della stampa, which was never printed.

=== Chronological list of publications ===
Beni's published works include:

- In Timaeum Platonis sive in naturalem atque divinam Platonis et Aristotelis Philosophiam decades tres (Rome, 1594 and 1605; Padua, 1624)
- Oratio pro feria quarta Cinerum (Rome, 1594)
- Disputatio in qua quaeritur, an sive actori sive reo (Rome, 1594)
- De ecclesiasticis Baronii annalibus disputatio (Rome, 1596)
- Discorsi sopra l'inondazione del Tevere (Rome, 1599)
- De humanitatis studiis oratio (Padua, 1600)
- Disputatio in qua ostenditur praestare comoediam atque tragoediam metrorum vinculis solvere (Padua, 1600)
- Risposta alle considerazioni e ai dubbi del dell'Ecc.mo Sig. Dottor Malacreta accademico ardito sopra il Pastor Fido (Padua, 1600)
- Discorso nel quale si dichiarano e stabiliscono molte cose pertinenti alla Risposta data a, dubbi e alle considerazioni del Malacreta sopra il Pastor Fido (Venice, 1600)
- Qua tandem ratione dirimi possit controversia ... de efficaci Dei auxilio et libero arbitrio (Padua, 1603)
- Comparatione di Homero, Virgilio e Torquato Tasso (Padua, 1607)
- De historia libri quatuor (Venice, 1611)
- L'Anticrusca overo il Paragone dell'italiana lingua (Padua, 1612)
- Comparatione di Torquato Tasso con Homero e Virgilio insieme con la difesa di Ariosto paragonato ad Homero (Padua, 1612)
- Commentarii in Aristotelem poeticam (Padua, 1613)
- Orationes quinquaginta (Padua, 1613)
- Il Cavalcanti overo la difesa dell'Anticrusca di Michelangelo Fonte (Padua, 1614)
- Rime varie (Padua, 1614)
- Il Goffredo ovvero Gerusalemme liberata del Tasso col commento di P. B. (Padua, 1616)
- Commentarii in sex priores libros Aeneidos Virgilii (Venice, 1622)
- Commentarii in Aristotelis libros Rhetoricorum duobus tomis explicatis (Venice, 1624)
- Orationes quinque et septuaginta (Venice, 1624)
- Trattato dell'origine e fasti familiari della famiglia Trissina (Padua, 1624)

== Bibliography ==
- Accame Bobbio, Aurelia (1970). "Beni, Paolo". Enciclopedia Dantesca. Rome: Istituto dell'Enciclopedia Italiana.
- Diffley, Paul B. (1988). Paolo Beni: A Biographical and Critical Study. Clarendon Press.
- Diffley, Paul B. (2002). "Beni, Paolo". In Peter Hainsworth; David Robey (eds.). The Oxford Companion to Italian Literature. Oxford University Press. ISBN 978-0-19-818332-7.
- Mazzacurati, Giancarlo (1966). "Beni, Paolo". Dizionario Biografico degli Italiani, Volume 8: Bellucci–Beregan (in Italian). Rome: Istituto dell'Enciclopedia Italiana. ISBN 978-8-81200032-6.
- Sacchini, Lorenzo (2020). "Beni, Paolo". In Marco Sgarbi (ed.). Encyclopedia of Renaissance Philosophy. Springer. pp. 1–4. doi:10.1007/978-3-319-02848-4_711-1. ISBN 978-3-319-02848-4.
- Tomassini, Stefano (2007). "Paolo Beni (1552/53–1625)". In Gaetana Marrone (ed.). Encyclopedia of Italian Literary Studies. Vol. 1: A–J. Taylor & Francis. pp. 174–176.
