= Jephthes, sive Votum =

1554 tragedy by George Buchanan

Jephthes, sive Votum (Note: Or Iephthes.) (translated into English as Jephtha, or the Vow) is a tragedy by Scottish historian and humanist scholar George Buchanan first published in 1554. Based on the biblical account of Jephthah and the sacrifice of his daughter in the Book of Judges, Buchanan wrote the play while he was a teacher in France.

== Plot ==
In the prologue, an angel explains how Israel has incurred the wrath of God and is like "a horse which must suffer the bit and spur it will remember its duty." He announces Israel's victory over Ammon; the Israelites are led by the God-fearing Jephthah, who vows while returning home from the war to "make a burnt offering to Jehovah of whomever comes out first to meet him from his house."

Realising his error after he is first greeted by his daughter, Jephthah has to choose between saving her life and honouring his vow to God. Although Jephthah himself believes that he is obligated to sacrifice his daughter, a priest calls such an action "dreadful" and advises him to change his mind. Jephthah's wife affirms the priest's argument, while adding that sacrificing their daughter would amount to paganism.

Jephthah's daughter is initially anxious to avoid death but she later accepts her fate. At first, she sees it as a matter of filial piety, but she subsequently conceives of her death as Christ-like. Before being sacrificed, she rejects Jephthah's offer to die on her behalf and declares that she will only submit to God's authority. Her throat is slit by the priest and a messenger extols her heroism.

== Composition and publication history ==
Jephthes, sive Votum was written by George Buchanan between 1539 and 1546, while he was a teacher at the Bordeaux-based College de Guyenne; Buchanan intended for the schoolchildren to perform the play, as part of an annual tradition at the school. Modelled on classical Greek drama, the play largely comprises Latin dialogue written in the iambic trimeter.

The structure of Jephthes takes after that of Iphigenia in Aulis, though its plot is based on the tenth and eleventh chapters of the Book of Judges, which revolve around the head of the Gileadite army, Jephthah, who has to sacrifice his daughter as part of a vow made to God. In Buchanan's play, she is given the name Iphis, an allusion to Iphigenia. Buchanan also invented the character of Storge, Jephthah's wife. Jephthes was first published in Paris in 1554; fourteen editions were published until 1600 in locations like Antwerp (1567), London (1580), and Geneva (1590). An Italian translation by Scipione Bargagli was published in Lucca in 1587.
