= Petrarch's and Shakespeare's sonnets =

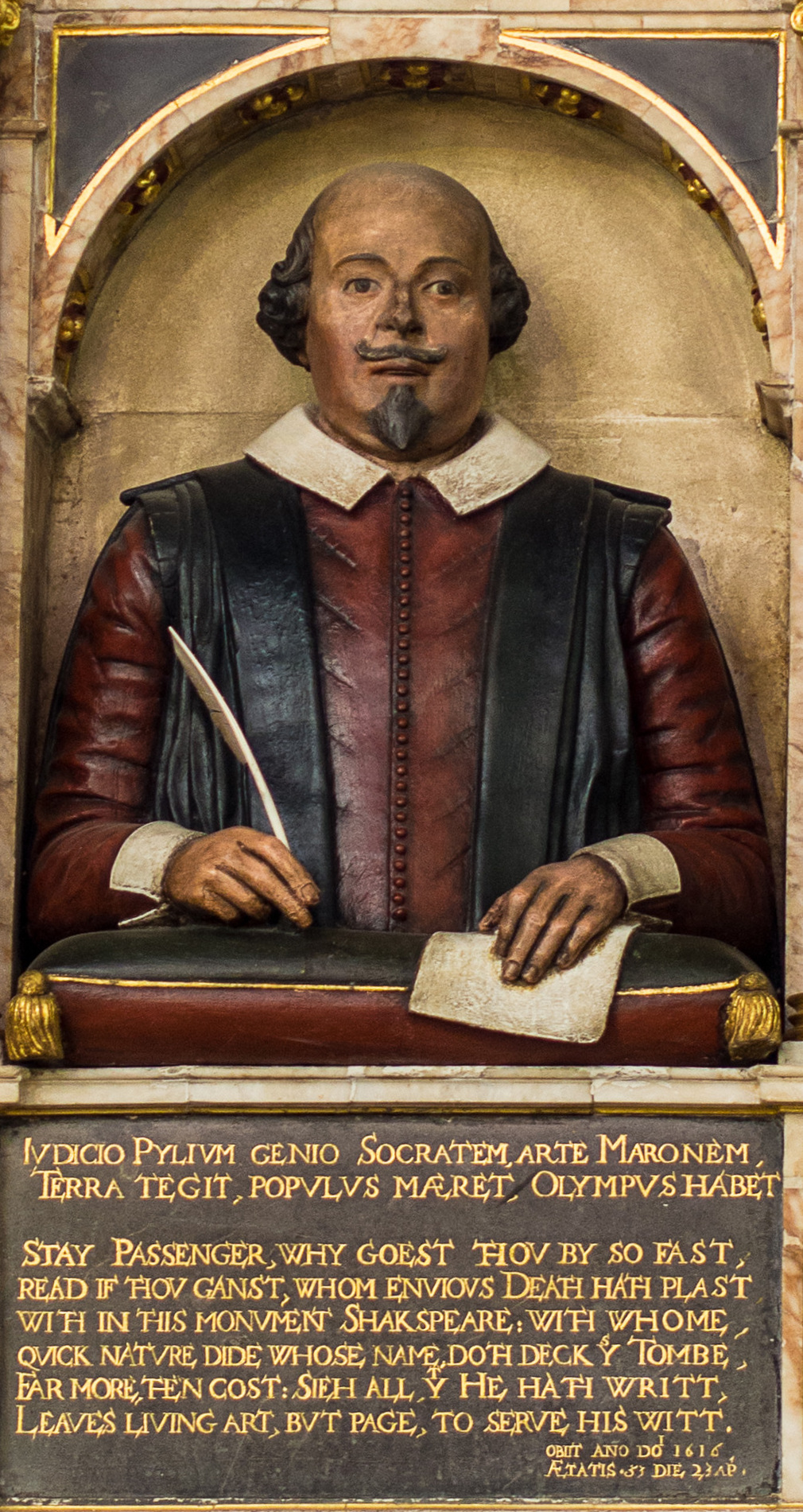
Shakespeare's funerary monument

The sonnets of Petrarch and Shakespeare are known for reshaping the poetic conventions of the sonnet form. Both introduced technical changes to the form, with their own distinctive rhyme schemes. Both also expanded the subject matter and emotional tones that could be expressed in sonnets. They are considered masters of the form, and their popularity contributed to the popularity of the sonnet itself.

== Sonnet structure ==
The sonnet is a type of poem finding its origins in Italy around 1235 AD. While the early sonneteers experimented with patterns, Francesco Petrarca (anglicised as Petrarch) was one of the first to significantly solidify sonnet structure. The Italian or Petrarchan sonnet consists of two parts; an octave and a sestet. The octave can be broken down into two quatrains; likewise, the sestet is made up of two tercets. The octave presents an idea to be contrasted by the ending sestet. The particular quatrains and tercets are divided by change in rhyme. Petrarch typically used an ABBA ABBA pattern for the octave, followed by either CDE CDE or CDC DCD rhymes in the sestet. (The symmetries (ABBA vs. CDC) of these rhyme schemes have also been rendered in musical structure in the late 20th century composition Scrivo in Vento inspired by Petrarch's Sonnet 212, Beato in Sogno.) The rhyme scheme and structure of Petrarch's sonnets work together to emphasize the idea of the poem: the first quatrain presents the theme and the second expands on it. The repeated rhyme scheme within the octave strengthens the idea. The sestet, with either two or three different rhymes, uses its first tercet to reflect on the theme and the last to conclude.

William Shakespeare utilized the sonnet in love poetry of his own, employing the sonnet structure conventionalized by English poets Wyatt and Surrey. This structure, known as the English or Shakespearean sonnet, consists of three quatrains and a concluding couplet. The rhyme scheme is a simple ABAB CDCD EFEF GG format. The effect is “like going for a short drive with a very fast driver: the first lines, even the first quatrain, are in low gear; then the second and third accelerate sharply, and ideas and metaphors flash past; and then there is a sudden throttling-back, and one glides to a stop in the couplet”. Like Petrarch, Shakespeare used structure to explore the multiple facets of a theme in a short piece.

=== Example of Petrarchan sonnet ===
In what bright realm, what sphere of radiant thought
Did Nature find the model whence she drew
That delicate dazzling image where we view
Here on this earth what she in heaven wrought
What fountain-haunting nymph, what dryad, sought
In groves, such golden tresses ever threw
Upon the gust? What heart such virtues knew?—
Though her chief virtue with my death is fraught.
He looks in vain for heavenly beauty, he
Who never looked upon her perfect eyes,
The vivid blue orbs turning brilliantly—
He does not know how Love yields and denies;
He only knows, who knows how sweetly she
Can talk and laugh, the sweetness of her sighs.

A
B
B
A
A
B
B
A
C
D
C
D
C
D

—Translation by Joseph Auslander of Petrarch,

While the poem as a whole aims at praising love, the focus shifts at the break between octave and sestet. In the first eight lines, the speaker poses a series of questions in admiration of a beloved; the last six lament the man who has not experienced love.

=== Example of Shakespearean sonnet ===
Shall I compare thee to a summer's day?
Thou art more lovely and more temperate:
Rough winds do shake the darling buds of May,
And summer's lease hath all too short a date:
Sometime too hot the eye of heaven shines
and often is his gold complexion dimmed;
And every fair from fair sometimes declines,
By chance or nature's changing course untrimmed;
But thy eternal summer shall not fade,
Nor lose possession of that fair thou ow'st;
Nor shall death brag thou wander'st in his shade,
When in eternal lines to time thou grow'st:
So long as men can breathe, or eyes can see,
So long lives this, and this gives life to thee.

A
B
A
B
C
D
C
D
E
F
E
F
G
G

—From Shakespeare, Sonnet 18

The beloved, whose beauty Shakespeare idolizes here, is given the gift of immortality by the poet; the first two quatrains primarily address different ways in which the physical beauty of the material world inherently dims, fades, and/or falls short of ideal beauty at some point. In the third quatrain the poet presents his beloved with the gift of immortality in his lines of verse. The changing rhymes emphasize the dualist nature of beauty (how those things which are beautiful in their prime inevitably grow old, fade, and die), while the alternating pattern provides continuity. The independently rhymed couplet introduces yet another shift in the poem; the speaker reiterates how his beautiful beloved will be eternally preserved as long as men can breathe and see, and as long as the poem exists the beloved does, too.

== Comparing sonnet sequences ==
The term sonnet sequence might be rephrased as series or cycle of sonnets. Sonnets become more significant when they are read in the order that the poet places them, as opposed to reading them at random. Thus, the most unusual aspect of such a sequence is the sense of a “unity within a larger unity."

Sonnet sequences do not follow a spelled-out narrative progression, nor are they simply compilations of random poems with similar themes, “they are something in between." (Note: Almost all of the quotations for the remainder of this comparison are extracted from pages 360–384 of Carol Thomas Neely’s “The Structure of English Renaissance Sonnet Sequence”. A reference is noted for the one exception in paragraph four.) The structure lies in the beginnings and endings of the sequences, and in their overall thematic advancements. The beginnings of the sequences usually contain sonnets that “introduce characters, plot, and themes”. The commencing sonnets suggest an account of the birth of a love “experience” and hopefully foresee a happy ending. However, there is often also a sense of knowing the actual outcome of the sequence. In turn, the idea that the poet is in the middle of the experience, and knows its ending at the same time gives the sequence a “structural and narrative control”. The ultimate goal of the poet in both English and Italian sequences is to win the beloved, which he can only do if he “declares and analyzes his passion, celebrates and courts the beloved, and writes poetry to please her/him”.

Many English sonnet sequences start with addresses to the reader, and “many of [these addresses] specifically raise questions about the relationship between being in love and writing and reading love sonnets”. The beloved is a major interest of sonnet sequences, but the poetry itself is also an important focus. While the soulful poetry is intended to woo the beloved, it is also written for an audience to whom a clear succession should be important. A common indication of progression is “the movement from indirect description of the beloved to direct address to her”. However, there is an “antithetical tendency” to discontinue this personal address into a more impersonal language at moments of “conflict and stress”. An even further progression is formulated with the “inclusion of explicit autobiographical detail,” which “increases intensity and immediacy”. In other words, as the sequence intensifies, so do the relationships between poet and beloved, reader and beloved, and therefore poet and reader.

It is thought that the English inherited the Italian structure of the sonnet sequence from Dante and Petrarch, and then tailored it to fit their own intentions. Shakespeare's Sonnet 130, in which, “while declaring his love for his mistress, he mocks the Petrarchan standard vocabulary of praise”, is an example that marks English independence from the conventions of Petrarch. The English sonnet sequences “exemplify the Renaissance doctrine of creative imitation as defined by Petrarch”.

Petrarch wrote and revised his famous sequence Canzoniere, or Song Book, between the years of 1327 and 1374. It comprises 366 poems divided into two parts: 1–263 and 264–366. Petrarch gradually constructed this work, which is derived from the countless drafts and revisions that he made throughout its creation. It is famously known for “shed[ding] light on the generation of English sequence”. Petrarch's concern for rearrangements in and alterations to his sonnet sequence suggests that he treated his poems like works of art, in which there is always room for improvement. This idea can also be applied to Shakespeare's ideals, considering his sonnets 138 and 144 first appeared in 1599 in The Passionate Pilgrim, and then appeared “much revised and strengthened” in the 1609 publication of The Sonnets.

There is a triple focus to all sonnet sequences that was originally put forth by the Italian model: “the poet-lover’s passion, the beloved who must be celebrated and won, and the poetry, which unites lover and beloved”. They are generally all linked by the metaphor of procreation. Petrarch's Sonnet 9 of Canzoniere familiarizes this metaphor and foreshadows its re-emergence in Shakespeare's Sonnets 1–17 of The Sonnets. The principal structuring tool in both the English and Italian sequences is the defined division into two parts. The first part makes a concrete relationship between poet and beloved (the solid Petrarchan relationship), while the second part is shorter and brings about some sort of change in the relationship and the two members of it. In Canzoniere, this change comes in the form of Laura's death, and in The Sonnets, it occurs with Shakespeare's shift of focus from “idealizing love to sexual use”.

For these two sonneteers, ending the sequence proves to be difficult in that the goal of winning the beloved is not achieved. Though normally coveted, the “open-ended structure and sequential movement of the sequence offer no logical stopping place”. Also, the fact that the second part of the sequence must act like the couplet of an individual sonnet not only creates an imbalance in the sequence, but it also puts pressure on the poet to make sure the ending has “special force”. The three main strategies that English sonneteers end up choosing from are: stopping abruptly in medias res; achieving detachment by moving into a different mode, genre, or voice; or providing a narrative resolution. Petrarch opted for the second strategy by moving into a religious mode. Shakespeare also chose the second strategy by moving into a renaissance mode, focusing on projecting his fears and desires onto Cupid. A series of complaints can also be found in the concluding sonnets of Shakespeare's sequence, which “justify the beloved’s chastity and break the identification with the poet-lover”. In both Petrarch's and Shakespeare's sequences, the indicated release—whether by death or by time—“releases the lover and the sequence abruptly shifts gears”.

== Ovidian influences in the sonnets ==
Ovid's completion of the Metamorphoses ensured that, as he puts it, part of him will survive the death of his own body. (Note: "Still in my better part I shall be borne immortal far beyond the lofty stars and I shall have an undying name." (Metamorphoses, XV, 875–876)) The phrasing at the end of the Metamorphoses, in the account of Hercules' transfiguration upon Oeta (Note: "he gained new vigour in his better part." (Metamorphoses, IX, 269)) and the likening of poetic achievement to spiritual transcendence captures some of the most extravagant claims that western culture has made for such achievement.

Ovid was a uniquely important influence of Petrarch. Among the Ovidian texts to which Petrarch was attracted was one of those that Shakespeare fancied, and he gives it almost exactly Shakespeare's spin. (Note: "Alas, if by speaking I renew the burning desire that was born the day I left behind the better part of me, and if love can be cured by the long forgetfulness, who then forces me back to the bait so that my pain may grow? And why do I not first turn to stone in silence?" (Canzoniere, XXXVII, 49–56))

Laura, left behind in France, is his better part; even at a great distance she commands his heart and voice. Indeed, in making it impossible for him to be silent, she is his Muse; Petrarch turns out to be the historical link between the newer meaning of Ovid's theory of his “better half” and its original one. In the speech that Petrarch gives when he receives the laurel crown on the Capitoline Hill he invokes the conclusion to the Metamorphoses straightforwardly as a proof for his thesis about the nobility of poetic fame, and taken together the two citations define one of the most innovative and influential twists that he gives to the tradition of fin’ amors: this poet's love for his lady is, by design, all but indistinguishable from his literary ambition, his love of the laurel crown. The symbolic focus of that coincidence is the story of Daphne's transformation into Apollo's tree. Petrarch made the story in the Metamorphoses the dominant myth of the longest poem in the sequence, Canzoniere 23. This poem is a virtuoso sequence of a half dozen Ovidian myths, from Apollo and Daphne to Actaeon and Diana, offered up as figuration of the poet's own subjective experience; it has become known as the canzone della metamorfosi, a sustained “lyricization of epic materials,” which effectively rewrites Ovid's long poem as erotic and professional autobiography.

This incorporation of the Metamorphoses into lyricism has momentous consequences for the following history of Petrarchanism, whereas poets such as Pierre de Ronsard and Barnabe Barnes, used each of the Ovidian myths as a figure for achieved sexual intercourse. Within the lyric sequence, such evocations play against the expectation of female unattainability, which is also one of Petrarch's legacies, and contribute powerfully to Petrarchanism's reputation for shameless and often bizarre sensuality.

We find this phrase's English equivalent twice in Shakespeare's Sonnets. (Note: "Oh how thy worth with manners may I singe, / When thou art all the better part of me?" (Sonnet 39, 1–2); and "My spirit is thine, the better part of me" (Sonnet 74, 8)) In neither case, however, is the context the same as that of Ovid's. Shakespeare makes such boasts in the Sonnets, and they owe much to Ovidian precedent; but this particular phrase has migrated into different territory, the lover's affirmation of a transcendent dependence on the beloved. Ovid never writes this way of Corinna in his Amores, where she is only an occasional longing; it is unmistakably his desire, not her merit that animates the Amores. Shakespeare, however, regards the beloved object highly as the all-inclusive focus. Indeed, justification of the lover's existence marks the decisive new start for European love poetry in the thirteenth century.

Despite Shakespeare's interest in and references of Ovid in his Sonnets, the second decade of the seventeenth century brought about a departure from the Ovidian territory that Renaissance sonneteering had cultivated. Shakespeare tended to ban mythology from his Sonnets. Of the few mythological allusions Shakespeare incorporates into the sonnets, seldom are they depicted in the same way Ovid depicts them in his Metamorphoses. In Sonnet 53, Adonis is paired with Helen as an exemplar of human beauty (53.5, 7); Mars’ name appears, though not Venus (55.7); ‘heavie Saturne’ laughs and dances with ‘proud pide Aprill’ (98.2–4); the nightingale is called Philomel (102.7) and the phoenix is mentioned (19.4). In the procreation sonnets, a reference to the myth of Narcissus is clearly intended by Shakespeare. (Note: "Oh, I am he! I have felt it, I know now my own image. I burn with love of my own self; I both kindle the flames and suffer them. . . . the very abundance of my riches beggars me" (Metamorphoses, III, 463–464 and 466)) (Note: "But thou contracted to thine owne bright eyes, / Feed’st thy lights flame with selfe substaintial fewell, / Making a famine where aboundance lies" (Sonnet 1, 5–7))

Moreover, the latter half of the Sonnets depicts less flesh in the form of seduction. In the dark lady poems, the seduction has already succeeded; its consequences (Note: "Injoyd no sooner but dispised straight" (Sonnet 129, 5)) are overwhelmingly shame and anger. Desire in the young man is of a different order, intense but also idealized and Platonic in a way which male Petrarchists writing about women often attempt but seldom achieve. Shakespeare calls his young man "sweet boy" (108, 5) and alludes occasionally to "rosie lips and cheeks" (116, 9), but is otherwise restrained and abstract.

== Petrarch's and Shakespeare's lovers ==
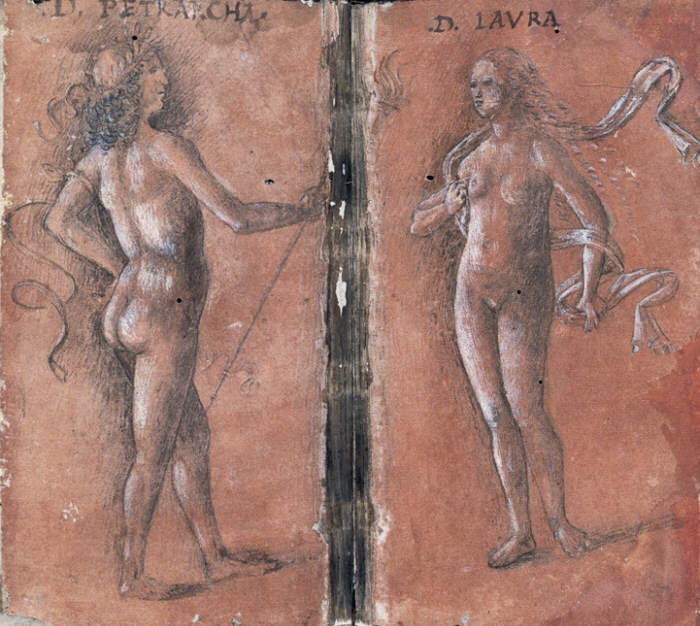
Sketch of Petrarch and his Laura as Venus (ca. 1444)

Although Petrarch is accredited with perfection of the sonnet, Shakespeare still made changes in sonnet form and composition 200 years after Petrarch's death. While Petrarch's sonnets focused mainly on one hub, Shakespeare developed many subjects within his themes such as insomnia, slave of love, blame, dishonesty, and sickness. Despite creating complicated plots, Shakespeare also manages to place ulterior motifs among his two lovers, building new poetic form where Petrarch left off.

Petrarch's sonnets were dedicated solely to Laura. She is thought to be an imaginary figure and a play on the name Laurel, the leaves with which Petrarch was honored for being the poet laureate and the very same honor he longed for in his sonnets as a “Laurel Wreath”. The name game has a further layer: "L'aura" is also "gold", the colour of her hair. In the allegorical canzone 323 (Standomi un giorno solo a la fenestra), we see that the mysterious phoenix has a head of gold. "Una strania fenice, ambedue l'ale di porpora vestita, e 'l capo d'oro..." The Focus of love within Petrarch's sonnets contains a unique contrast with Shakespeare's. Petrarch wrote his poems to a beloved from afar. His interactions were based only on his viewing Laura; his love for her was purely invented. Shakespeare on the other hand shared a reciprocal love with both his lovers; the objects of his love were “articulate, active partners.” Shakespeare's sonnets are divided between his two lovers: sonnets 1–126 for a male, and sonnets 127–152 for a female; the first to a fair youth, and the second to a dark lady. Petrarch's sonnets in opposition are focused solely on one lover, Laura. Shakespeare copies the female love in Petrarch's poetry with the beloved youth who is created, cherished, adored, and eternized. After the fair youth, the dark lady brings a completely opposite literary figure into play. The dark lady is both of a different gender and she displays aspects contrary to Laura. One point that Shakespeare made while writing about the dark lady is a satirical comment on Petrarch's love:

My mistress' eyes are nothing like the sun
Coral is far more red than her lips' red

— Lines 1 and 2 of Shakespeare's Sonnet 130

The dark lady is not shown as beautiful or idolized as Petrarch portrayed his love, Laura. This idolization analyzed from a stand point of courtly love draws an interesting segue to the death of Laura in Petrarch's sonnets, which leads to “the sublimation and transformation of desire”. His adoration changes from an earthly love, Laura, to a love of the Virgin Mary. Petrarch's obsessive feelings toward Laura fit remarkably well under the title courtly love. This love is a way to explain his erotic desire and spiritual aspiration. Shakespeare, similarly to Petrarch, shows an eroticized love to the fair youth, a love that also fits nicely under pretense of courtly love. Then like with the death of Laura, this switch to a more divine love can be seen in Shakespeare's last two sonnets which are dedicated to Cupid, the Roman god of love.

== Bibliography ==
- Braden, Gordon (2000). "Ovid, Petrarch, and Shakespeare's Sonnets". In Taylor, Albert Booth (ed.). Shakespeare's Ovid: The Metamorphoses in the Plays and Poems. Cambridge: Cambridge University Press. ISBN 978-0-521-77192-4.
- Edmondson, Paul; Wells, Stanley (2004). Shakespeare's Sonnets. Oxford and New York: Oxford University Press. ISBN 978-0199256112.
- Gajowski, Evelyn (1992). The Art of Loving: Female Subjectivity and Male Discursive Traditions in Shakespeare's Tragedies. Cranbury: University of Delaware Press. ISBN 978-0874133981.
- Going, William T. (1947). "The Term Sonnet Sequence". Modern Language Notes. 62 (6). The Johns Hopkins University Press: 400–402. doi:10.2307/2909278. ISSN 0149-6611. JSTOR 2909278.
- Neely, Carol Thomas (Autumn 1978). "The Structure of English Renaissance Sonnet Sequence". ELH. 45 (3). Johns Hopkins University Press: 359–389. doi:10.2307/2872643. JSTOR 2872643.
- Sedgwick, Eve Kosofsky (1985). Between Men: English Literature and Male Homosocial Desire. New York: Columbia University Press. pp. 28–48. ISBN 978-0231082730.
- Spiller, Michael R. G. (1992). The Development of The Sonnet: an Introduction. New York: Routledge. ISBN 0-415-07744-3. Archived from the original on 2019-01-21 – via Questia.
