= Silvio Accame =

Italian historian (1910–1997)

Silvio Accame (22 December 1910, in Pietra Ligure – 10 November 1997, in Frascati) was an Italian historian, best remembered for his books La lega ateniese del secolo IV a.C. (1941), Problemi di storia greca (1953), L'istituzione dell'eucaristia (1968), La storicità della Bibbia (1976) and Perché la storia (1979). A graduate of the Sapienza University of Rome, where he was a student of Gaetano De Sanctis, he taught Greek history at the University of Naples and later served as the president of the Pontifical Academy of Archaeology from 1983 to 1991. He was married to Aurelia Accame Bobbio, and edited publications with Aldo Ferrabino.
