= Vittorio Rossi (philologist) =

Italian philologist (1865–1938)

Vittorio Rossi (3 September 1865, in Venice – 18 January 1938, in Rome) was an Italian philologist and literary historian, best remembered for his literary criticism on the history of Italian literature which was published in three volumes. A graduate of the University of Padua, going on to serve as the university's rector from 1910 to 1913. From 1935 to 1938, he served as the president of the Accademia dei Lincei.
