= The Deceived Ones =

1531 play by Accademia degli Intronati

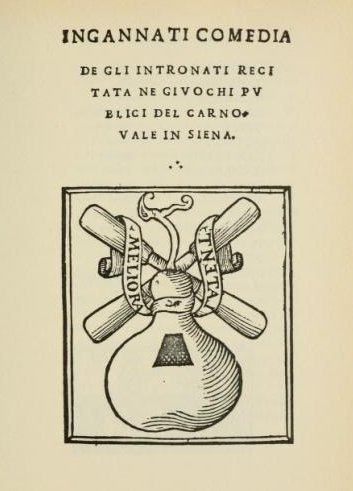
- Original language: Italian
- Written by: the Accademia degli Intronati
- Genre: Comedy of intrigue

Premiere
- Date: 12 February 1532
- Place: Siena

The Deceived Ones, or The Deceived (Italian: Gl'ingannati), is a 1531 comedy of intrigue written collectively by the Accademia degli Intronati (the center of intellectual life in Siena). It was the Academy's first publicly hosted event, performed on the last day of carnival 1532 (February 12).

It uses stock characters from Roman plays by Plautus and Terence that would go on to become staples of commedia dell'arte, formalized into a commercial art form by 1551. It was internationally successful and translated in many languages, including French, Spanish and Latin.

The play is believed to be the main source for the plot of William Shakespeare's comedy Twelfth Night, although as no contemporary English translation of the work is known, his direct source for the influence is uncertain.
