= Umberto Bosco =

Italian literary historian (1900–1987)

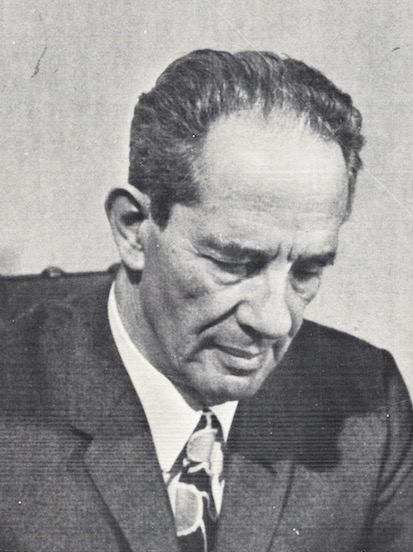
Image of Umberto Bosco

Umberto Bosco (2 October 1900, in Catanzaro – 24 March 1987, in Rome) was an Italian literary historian and literary critic. A graduate of the Sapienza University of Rome, he served as editor-in-chief of the Treccani encyclopaedia, and was a professor at the University of Milan. A member of the Accademia della Crusca, he was made a Grand Officer of the Order of Merit of the Italian Republic in 1976.
