= Enciclopedia Dantesca =

Italian encyclopedia

The Enciclopedia Dantesca, published 1970–1975 by the Istituto dell'Enciclopedia Italiana, in six volumes, under the general editorship of Umberto Bosco, is considered the reference book in Italian language about the life and works of Dante, described as a "monumental" work
