= Celso Cittadini =

Italian philologist (1553–1627)

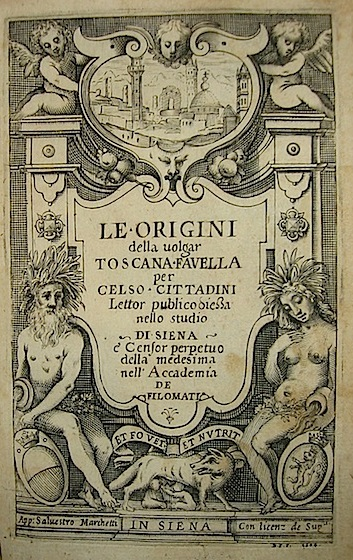
- Cittadini's treatise on the origins of the Tuscan dialect, published in 1604.
- Born: April 1, 1553; Rome, Papal States
- Died: 29 March 1627 (aged 73); Siena, Grand Duchy of Tuscany
- Occupations: philologist, university teacher, linguist, archivist, antiquarian
- Known for: Demonstration that Romance languages emerged from Vulgar Latin
- Spouse: Eufrasia Petroni
- Parent(s): Francesco Cittadini and Felice Cittadini (née Maddaleni)

Academic background
- Influences: Dante Alighieri; Petrarch; Pietro Bembo; Claudio Tolomei; Lodovico Castelvetro

Academic work
- Era: Late Renaissance
- Discipline: Italian studies
- Institutions: University of Siena
- Influenced: Girolamo Gigli

Celso Cittadini (1 April 1553 – 29 March 1627) was an Italian grammarian and philologist.

He was the author of important works in which he demonstrated the emergence of Romance languages from Vulgar Latin and the also defined phonetic laws that highlight the correlation between certain Latin vowels and their equivalents in Tuscan.

== Biography ==
Celso Cittadini was born in Rome into a family of noble origins which counted the poet Cecco Angiolieri among its ancestors. He studied Greek and Latin languages and classics, and travelled often. As court secretary, he moved from Rome first to Parma to work for Duke Ranuccio, then to Urbino under Francesco Maria II Della Rovere, and finally to Milan to Cardinal Federico Borromeo.

He returned to Rome in 1581, and following Petrarch's model wrote a songbook of madrigals and sonnets for the noblewoman Hippolita Calcagni known as Fiamma, entitled Rime platoniche. He travelled again in 1589, and in the same year wrote the Apologia delle donne under the name Infiammato. This marked his transition from Petrarchist poet to antiquarian and philologist.

He moved to Siena and married Eufrasia Petroni. He was chosen as the tutor of Cosimo, son of Ferdinando I de' Medici, and in 1598, on the recommendation of Ferdinando, he was appointed to the chair of Tuscan language and 'perpetual archivist' of Siena. A scholar of heraldry, he reconstructed the family tree of some of the older Sienese families. He actively dedicated himself to the study of grammar and linguistics, as well as the history of the Italian language.

== Major works ==
In 1601, he published the Treaty on the true origin, and the process, and the name of our language. He made original use of epigraphic and literary evidence to argue that Latin evolved into the vernacular independently of the ‘barbarian’ invasions. He appended to this publication a Trattato degli articoli e di alcune particelle della volgar lingua, in which he explains the use of pronominal particles, simple prepositions and articles; in the last case he demonstrates the derivation from the nominative case of Latin pronouns. In 1604, he published The origins of common Tuscan speech, in which he identified ten forces which determined the nature of the vernacular.

In 1721, almost a hundred years after his death, Girolamo Gigli published a collection of his major works, plus the posthumous Degl'idiomi toscani.

== Sources ==
- Richardson, Brian (2002). "Cittadini, Celso". In Hainsworth, Peter (ed.). The Oxford Companion to Italian Literature. Oxford University Press. ISBN 978-0-19-818332-7.
- Formichetti, Gianfranco (1982). "Cittadini, Celso". Dizionario Biografico degli Italiani (in Italian). Vol. 26: Cironi–Collegno. Rome: Istituto dell'Enciclopedia Italiana. ISBN 978-88-12-00032-6.
- Cittadini, Celso (1585). Rime platoniche [Platonic rhymes] (in Italian). Venice: Cornelio Arriuabene.
- Cittadini, Celso (1601). Trattato della vera origine, e del processo, e nome della nostra lingua [Treaty on the true origin, and the process, and the name of our language] (in Italian). Venice: Giovanni Battista Ciotti.
- Cittadini, Celso (1604). Le origini della volgar toscana favella [The origins of common Tuscan speech] (in Italian). Siena: Salvestro Marchetti.
- Cittadini, Celso (1721). Gigli, Girolamo (ed.). Opere di Celso Cittadini [The works of Celso Cittadini] (in Italian). Rome: Antonio de Rossi.

== Other projects ==
- Wikimedia Commons has images or other files associated with Celso Cittadini
