= Claudio Tolomei =

Italian philologist

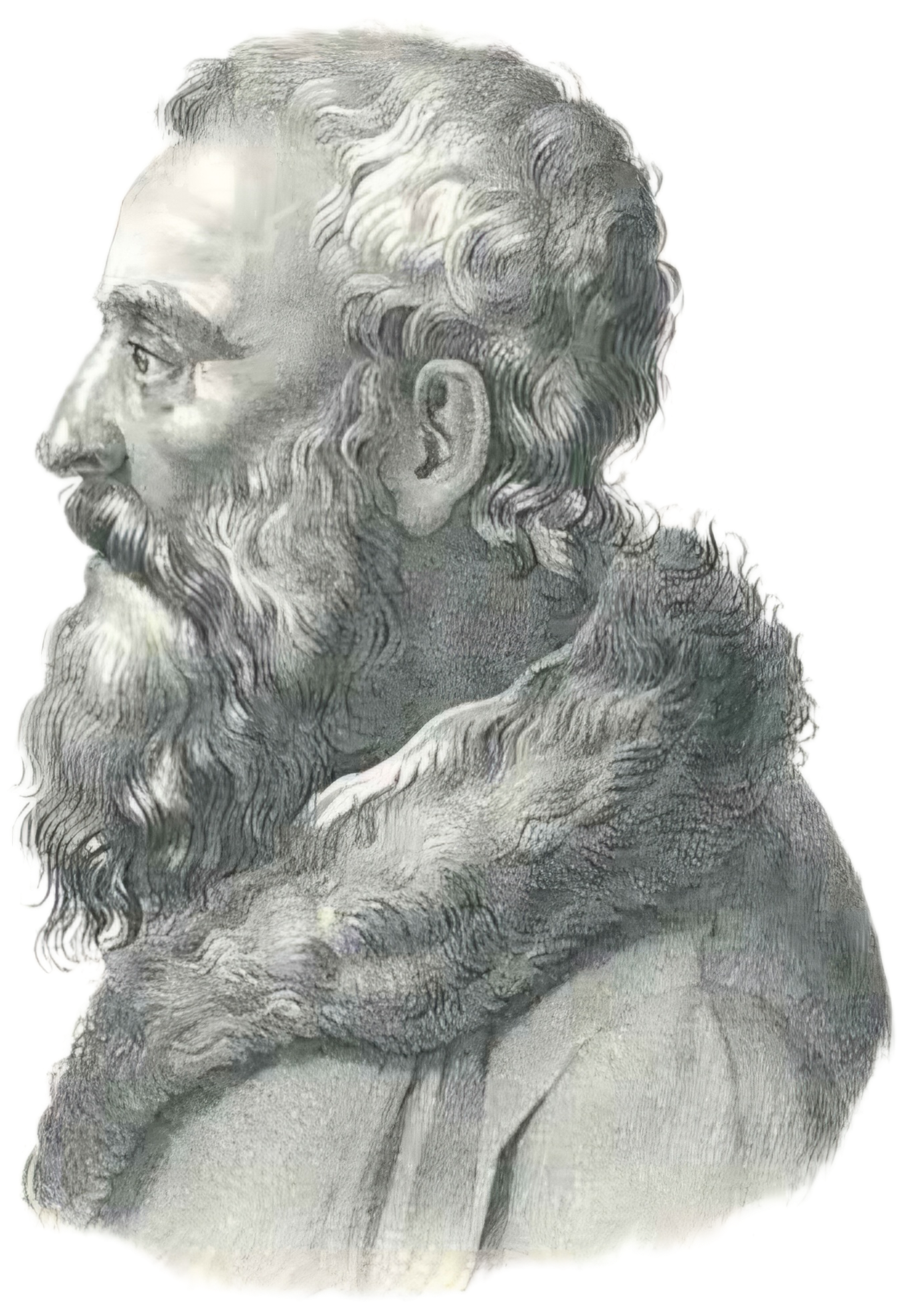
- Engraved portrait of Claudio Tolomei. From Delle lettere di M. Claudio Tolomei. Libri sette, vol. 1, Florence, 1849
- Born: Angelo Claudio Tolomei; 1492; Asciano, Grand Duchy of Tuscany
- Died: 23 March 1556 (aged 63–64); Rome, Papal States
- Occupations: Jurist; University teacher; Linguist; Bishop; Diplomat
- Parent(s): Pieranselmo di Gabrioccio Tolomei and Cornelia Tolomei (née Sozzini)

Academic background
- Education: University of Bologna
- Influences: Dante; Petrarch; Poliziano

Academic work
- Discipline: Italian studies
- Institutions: University of Siena
- Influenced: Dolce; Minturno; Cittadini

Angelo Claudio Tolomei (1492–1556) was an Italian philologist. His name in Italian is identical to that of Claudius Ptolemaeus, the 2nd-century Greek astronomer. He belonged to the prominent Tolomei family of Siena, and became a bishop attached to the court of Pope Paul III.

== Biography ==
He was born in Asciano in 1492 to an affluent Senese family, and was a teacher of law at the University of Siena from 1516 to 1518.

He then attached himself to the service of Cardinal Ippolito de' Medici, and is supposed to have had some part in the unsuccessful military expedition undertaken by Pope Clement VII against Siena, in 1526. At any rate, a sentence of banishment from his native city was passed upon him that year, which was not revoked until 1542. In 1527, he interested himself warmly for the imprisoned pontiff, in whose behalf he composed five discourses addressed to the Emperor Charles V.

In 1532, he was sent by Cardinal Ippolito, in his own name, to Vienna. Some time after the death of the cardinal, he entered the service of Pier Luigi Farnese, duke of Parma and Piacenza.

In 1542 the Accademia della Virtù was formed in Rome by Tolomei under the patronage of Marcello Cervini to prepare a new annotated edition of De architectura. Tolomei described the goals of the Accademia in a letter, as follows

- To Produce a comprehensive edition of Vitruvius' De architectura
- To compile a comparative lexicon, so scholars could establish a direct relationship between the techniques described by Vitruvius and the architecture of the surviving ancient monuments
- To create a comprehensive survey of surviving classical remains (sculptures, inscriptions, buildings)

He remained in Piacenza, with the title of Minister of Justice, until the tragical death of Pier Luigi, in 1547; he then retired to Padua, where he remained until the following year, when he went to Rome.

In 1549, he was made bishop of Curzola, a small island in the Adriatic Sea. In 1552, he was again in Siena, and had the honor to be appointed one of the sixteen citizens who were entrusted with the conservation of the public liberty. He was also sent with three others to thank the king of France for the protection he had accorded to the republic, and the discourse he delivered to that monarch at Compiègne has been preserved. He returned two years after, and died in Rome on March 23, 1553.

Tolomei was one of those to whom fellow Senese, Bernardino Ochino, corresponded from exile in Geneva, where he had fled after abandoning his monastic position due to accusations of heresy.

== Works ==
Tolomei was a writer of considerable merit. A famous jurist and philologist, he wrote Lettere and Orazioni, which constituted a lively testimony of his participation in the literary disputes and political events of the time. Tolomei was the defender of the Tuscan vulgate against the pure Florentineity of the language in the works of literary interest, anticipating many concepts of 19th-century scientific linguistics.

== List of works ==
- Laude delle donne bolognese, Bologna: per Iustiniano de Rubera, 1514.
- Il Polito di Adriano Franci da Siena delle lettere nuouamente aggiornate nella volgar lingua, con somma diligenza corretto et ristampato, Venice: Nicolò d'Aristotile detto Zoppino, 1531.
- Oratione de la pace di M. Claudio Tolomei, Rome: da Antonio Blado , 1534.
- Versi, et regole de la nuoua poesia toscana, Rome: per Antonio Blado 1539.
- De le lettere di M. Claudio Tolomei lib. sette. Con una breue dichiarazione in fine di tutto l'ordin de l'ortografia di questa opera, Venice: appresso Gabriel Giolito de Ferrari, 1547 (Google books); Cornetti, 1585 (Google books).
- Due orazioni in lingua toscana. Accusa contra Leon Secretario, di secreti riuelati. Difesa, Parma: appresso Sette Viotto, 1547.
- De le lettere di M. Claudio Tolomei lib. sette. Venezia: Gabriel Giolito de Ferrari. 1547.
- Oratione di Monsi. Claudio Tolomei Ambasciator di Siena recitata dinanci ad Henrico II Christianissimo Re di Francia, Venice: per Francesco Marcolini, 1552.
- Il Cesano, dialogo di m. Claudio Tolomei, nel quale da più dotti huomini si disputa del nome, col quale si dee ragioneuolmente chiamare la volgar lingua, Venice: appresso Gabriel Giolito de Ferrari, et fratelli, 1555 (Google books).
- Libro quinto delle Rime di diuersi illustri signori napoletani, e d'altri nobilissimi ingegni. Nuouamente raccolte, e con noua additione ristampate, Venice: appresso Gabriel Giolito de Ferrari, et fratelli, 1555 (in Vinegia: appresso Gabriel Giolito de Ferrari, et fratelli, 1555).
- Orazioni di M. Claudio Tolomei, Fermo: per Giuseppe Alessandro Paccasassi, 1783 (Google books).
- Alcune lettere politiche di Claudio Tolomei vescovo di Tolone scritte alla repubblica di Siena, ora primamente edite da Luciano Banchi, Siena: Tip. Sordo-muti di L. Lazzeri, 1868.
- Epistola di Agnolo Firenzuola in lode delle donne scritta a Messere Claudio Tolomei, nobile sanese, Perugia: Tipografia Santucci, 1844.
- Della edificazione d'una città sul monte Argentario, Florence: Tipografia dell'Arte della Stampa, 1885.
- Barbara Garvin, ed. (1992). Del raddoppiamento da parola a parola. Exeter: University of Exeter press.

== Bibliography ==
- Campbell, G. (2003). "Tolomei, Claudio". The Oxford Dictionary of the Renaissance. Oxford University Press.
- Claudio Tolomei entry (in Italian) by Camillo Guerrieri Crocetti in the Enciclopedia Treccani, 1937
- Jacomuzzi, Stefano (1970). "Tolomei, Claudio". In Bosco, Umberto (ed.). Enciclopedia Dantesca. Vol. 5. Istituto dell'Enciclopedia Italiana. p. 619.
- Lucioli, Francesco (2019). "TOLOMEI, Claudio". Dizionario Biografico degli Italiani (in Italian). Vol. 96: Toja–Trivelli. Rome: Institute of the Italian Encyclopaedia. ISBN 978-88-12-00032-6.
