= Accademia degli Intronati =

Sienese literary academy

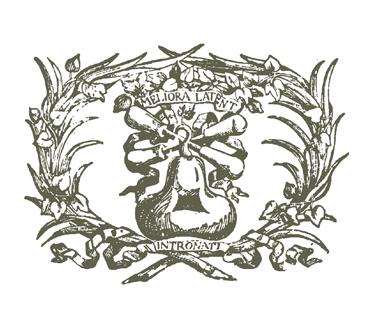
- Abbreviation: Gli Intronati
- Formation: 1525
- Headquarters: Siena, Italy
- Official language: Italian
- Remarks: Motto: Meliora latent ("The best things are hidden")

The Accademia degli Intronati was a prominent literary and scholarly society in Siena. It was founded between 1525 and 1527 as a gathering place for aristocracy, and became prominent by the 1550s.

== History ==
The founders of the academy were sex viri nobiles senenses (six noble men of Siena): Francesco Bandini Piccolomini (lo Scaltrito), Antonio Vignali (l’Arsiccio), Francesco Sozzi (l’Importuno), Marcantonio Piccolomini (il Sodo), Giovan Francesco Franceschi (il Moscone), and Alessandro Marzi (il Cirloso). One of the most active scholars during the academy’s initial phase was Alessandro Piccolomini (1508–1578). The academy was dedicated to the cultivation of poetry and eloquence in Italian, Latin, and Greek, with a particular focus on theatrical works – including plays written by its own members. The first publicly hosted event was the five-act comic play Gl'ingannati (The Deceived Ones), collectively written by the members of the Academy. Heavily inspired by classical comedy, it was translated into French in 1542 by the humanist Charles Estienne under the title La Comédie du Sacrifice ou Les Abusés. Gl'ingannati is believed to have served as a model for Shakespeare's comedy Twelfth Night. A characteristic of the Academy was its preference for comedy and the targeting of a female public. This distinguished the plays of the Academy's first wave of productions.

== See also ==
- Commedia dell'Arte
- Shakespeare's Twelfth Night
- Biblioteca Comunale degli Intronati

== Lecture ==
- Shakespeare and the Women of the Intronati, Sky Gilbert, Shakespeare Oxford Fellowship
