= Vincenzo Borghini =

Italian monk, artist, philologist and art collector

Dom Vincenzo Borghini OSB
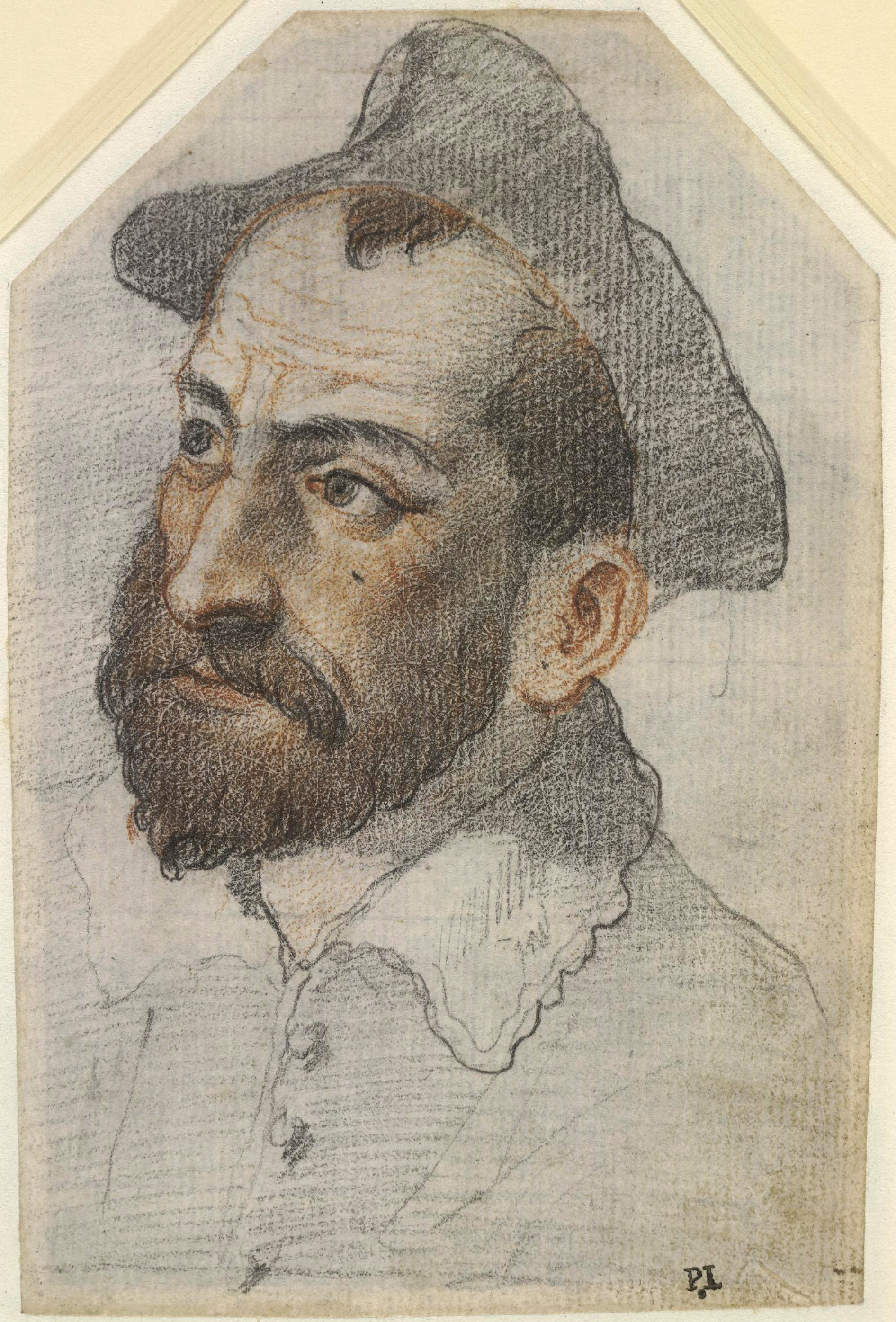
- Federico Zuccaro, Portrait of Vincenzo Borghini, black chalk and white chalk on paper, British Museum
- Title: Prior

Personal life
- Born: October 29, 1515 Florence, Grand Duchy of Tuscany
- Died: 15 August 1580 (aged 64) Florence, Grand Duchy of Tuscany
- Resting place: Church of the Innocenti, Florence
- Parent(s): Domenico Borghini and Mattea Borghini (née Capponi)
- Era: Italian Renaissance
- Occupation: Christian monk; Writer; Classical scholar; Historian

Religious life
- Religion: Roman Catholicism
- Order: Benedictines
- Ordination: 1641

Vincenzo Borghini OSB (29 October 1515 – 15 August 1580) was an Italian monk, artist, philologist, and art collector of Florence, Italy.

== Biography ==
Vincenzo Borghini was born at Florence in 1515 of a noble family, and was ordained a Benedictine priest in 1540. He was an artistic advisor to the Medici, and was engaged with Giorgio Vasari in designing and selecting the decoration of the Studiolo of Francesco I Medici in the Palazzo Vecchio of Florence. He also provided Vasari with the iconographical programme for the ceiling paintings in the Salone dei Cinquecento (1563; Florence, Palazzo Vecchio) and acted as iconographic adviser to the Medici court for many public ceremonials in the 1560s and 1570s.

After 1552, Borghini served as Spedalingo or Prior of the Ospedale degli Innocenti in Florence. He was the luogotenente of the Accademia del Disegno from 1563. He was one of the persons appointed to correct the Decameron of Giovanni Boccaccio by order of the Council of Trent, and performed this task for the edition of Florence, 1573. In the subsequent Annotazioni (1574), he explained the textual changes and examined Boccaccio's language.

Borghini was the inspiration behind the foundation of the Accademia della Crusca (1583), suggesting to Cosimo I de' Medici the names of a committee, including its future president Lionardo Salviati. And the fundamental work he did on the Annotazioni would later form the basis for the work of Salviati and for the first Vocabolario degli Accademici della Crusca of 1611. Borghini died in 1580, after having refused, through humility, the archbishopric of Pisa, which was offered to him some time before his death.

== Works ==
Borghini’s work remains largely unpublished, mainly because of his unsystematic method of jotting down sporadic notes, and the difficulty of some of his handwriting. His best known work, the Discorsi di M. Vincenzo Borghini, was published posthumously in 2 volumes in 1584 and 1585, and reissued in 1755 with annotations. In these dissertations he treats of the origin of Florence, and of several interesting particulars of its history, of its families, of its coins, etc. Borghini's fame reached a new height in the 19th century, and selections from his manuscripts were published sporadically, notably La Ruscelleide (Città di Castello, Lapi, 1898), a bitter satire against Girolamo Ruscelli, and the brief autobiographical notes Ricordi intorno alla sua vita (Florence, Libreria Editrice Fiorentina, 1909).

== Bibliography ==
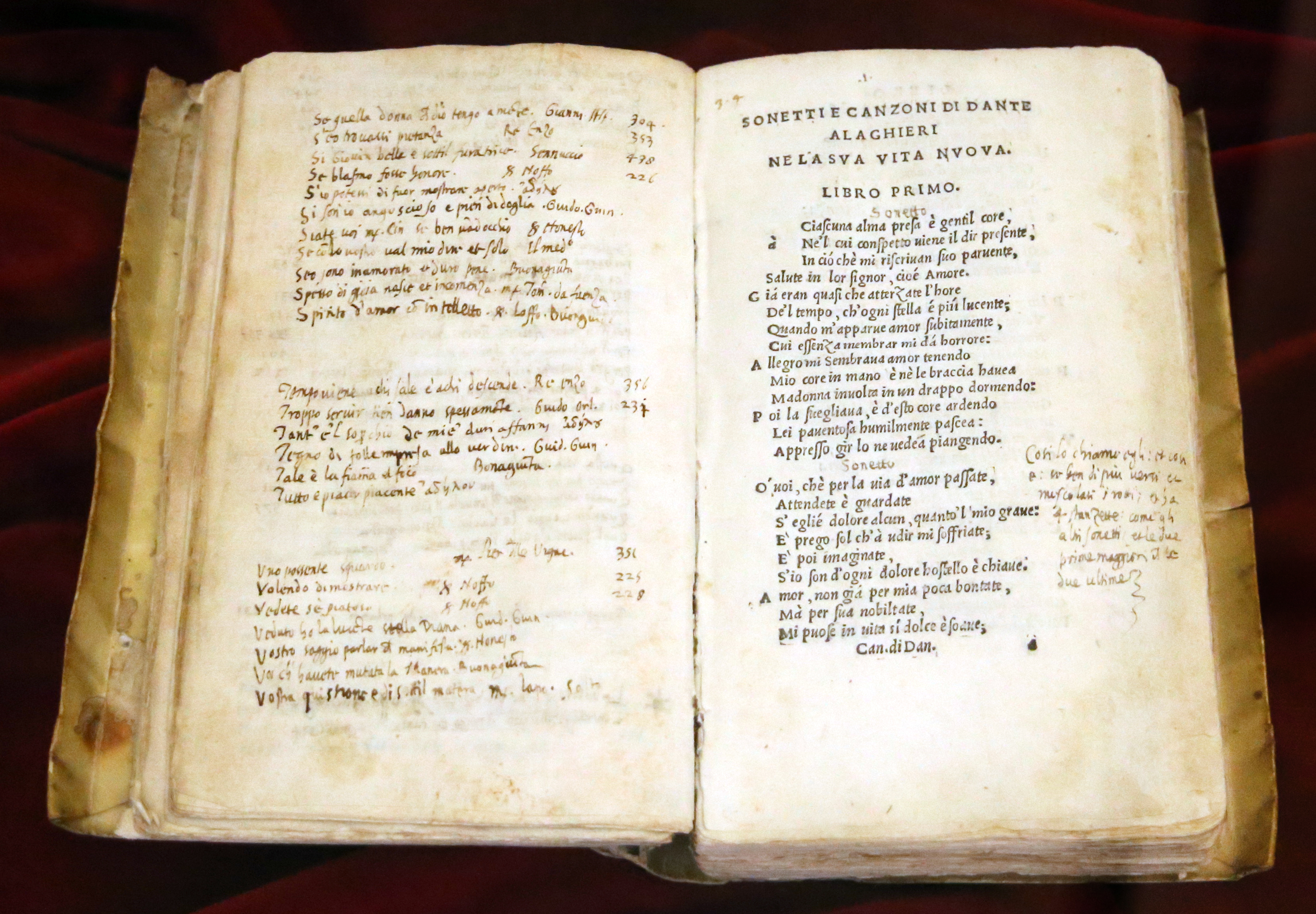
Edition of Dante Alighieri's Rime with handwritten annotations by Vincenzo Borghini, c. 1560-80

- Barbi, Michele (1889). "Degli studi di don Vincenzio Borghini sopra la storia e la lingua di Firenze". Il Propugnatore. II: 5–71.
- Bonora, Ettore (1966). "La difesa di Dante. Il nuovo canone degli autori fiorentini e la filologia di Vincenzo Borghini". Storia della letteratura italiana. Vol. IV. Milan: Garzanti. pp. 634–637.
- Chiecchi, Giuseppe; Troisio, Luciano (1984). Il Decameron sequestrato. Le tre edizioni censurate nel Cinquecento. Milan: Unicopli.
- Woodhouse, J. (2002). "Borghini, Vincenzio". The Oxford Companion to Italian Literature. Oxford University Press.
- Vincenzio Borghini. Filologia e invenzione nella Firenze di Cosimo I, catalogo della mostra a cura di G. Belloni e R. Drusi, mostra a cura di A. Calcagni Abrami e P. Scapecchi, Florence, Olschki, 2002.
- Fra lo «Spedale» e il Principe. Vincenzio Borghini, filologia e invenzione nella Firenze di Cosimo I. Atti del Convegno (Firenze, 21-22 marzo 2002), a cura di G. Bertoli e R. Drusi, Padua, Il Poligrafo, 2005.
