= Vocabolario degli Accademici della Crusca =

First dictionary of the Italian language

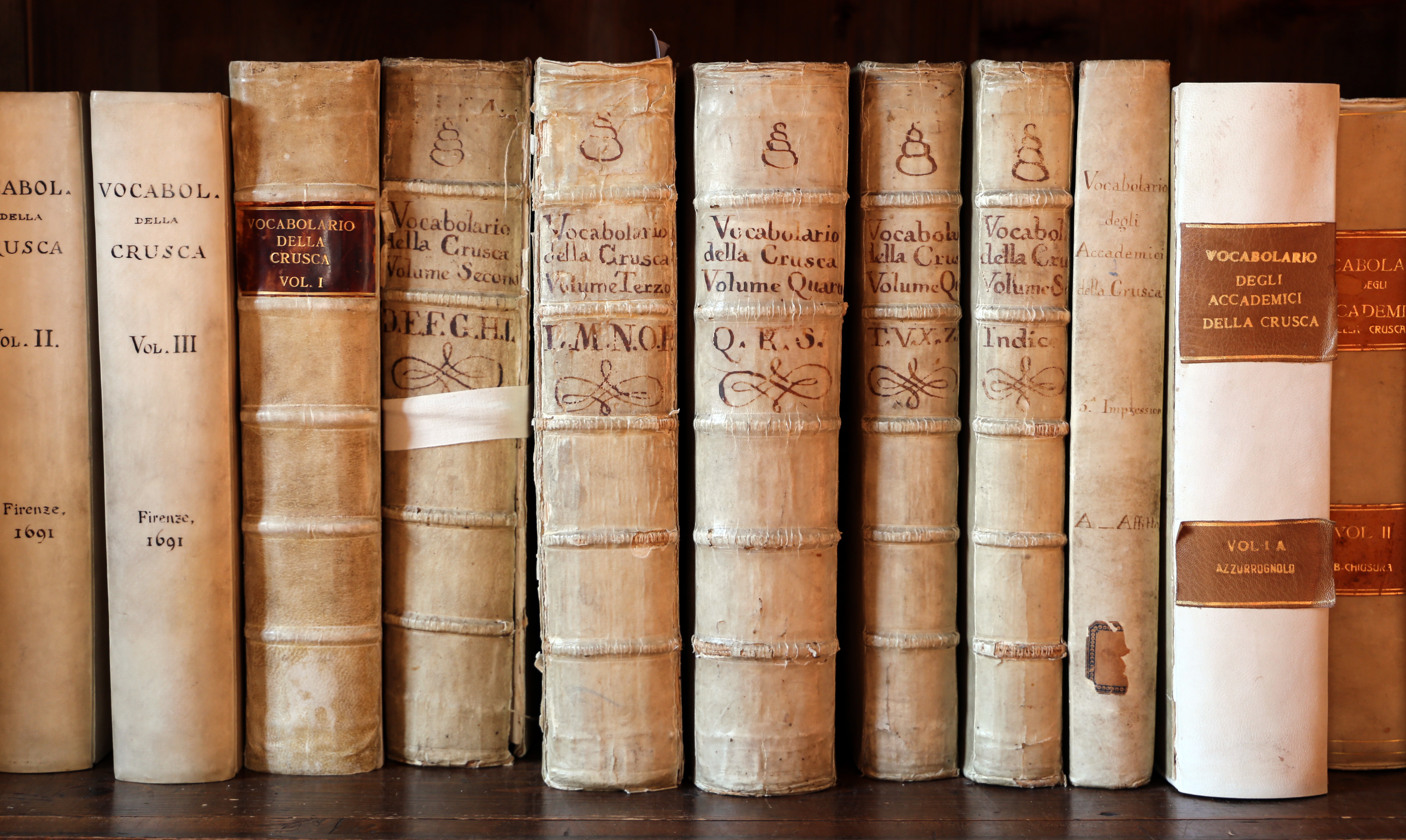
Volumes of the 4th edition of the Vocabolario

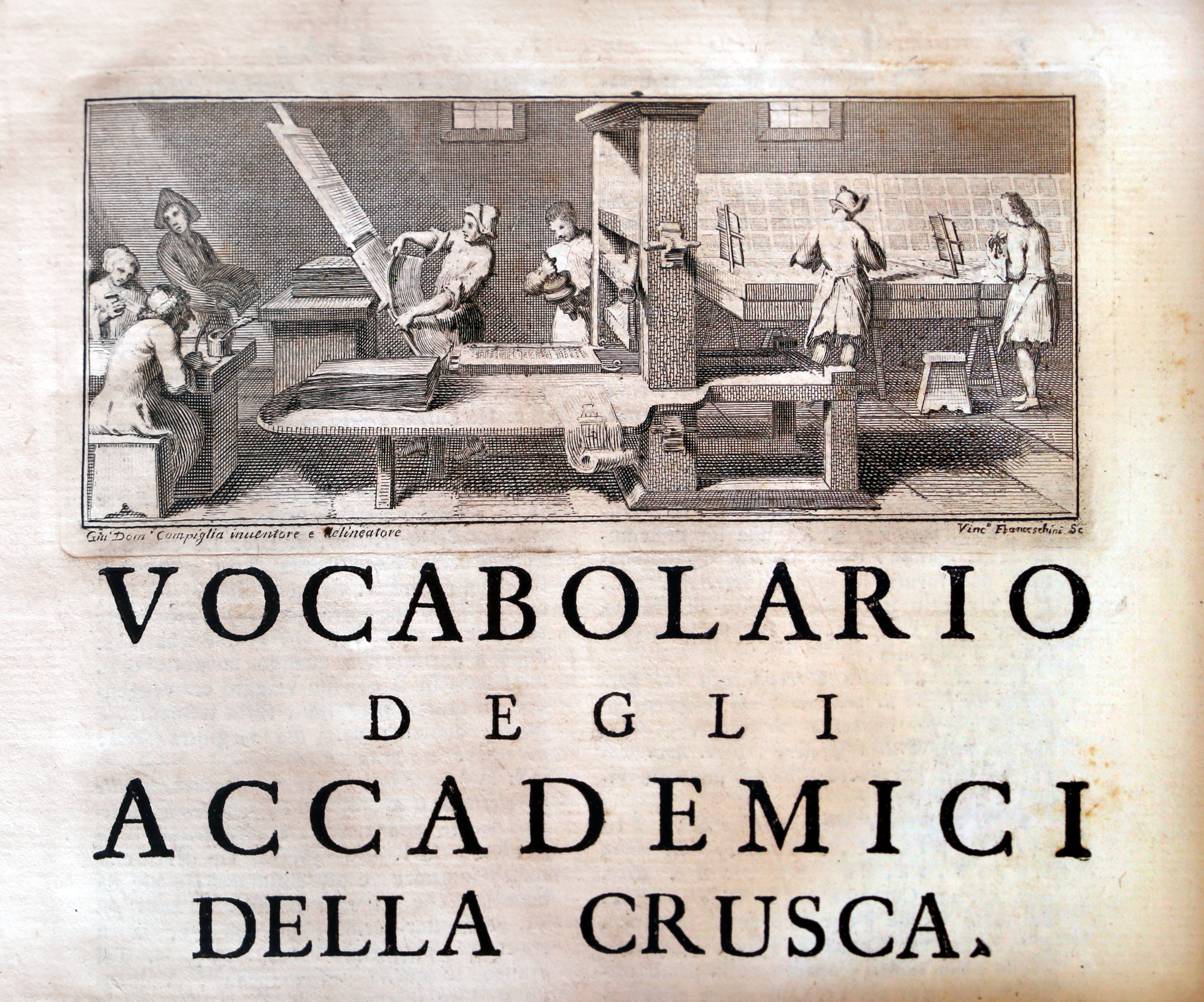
Incipit of a volume of the 4th Edition

The Vocabolario degli Accademici della Crusca was the first dictionary of the Italian language, published in 1612 by the Accademia della Crusca. It was also only the second dictionary of a modern European language, being just one year later than the Tesoro de la lengua castellana o española by Sebastián de Covarrubias in Spain in 1611.

== Background ==
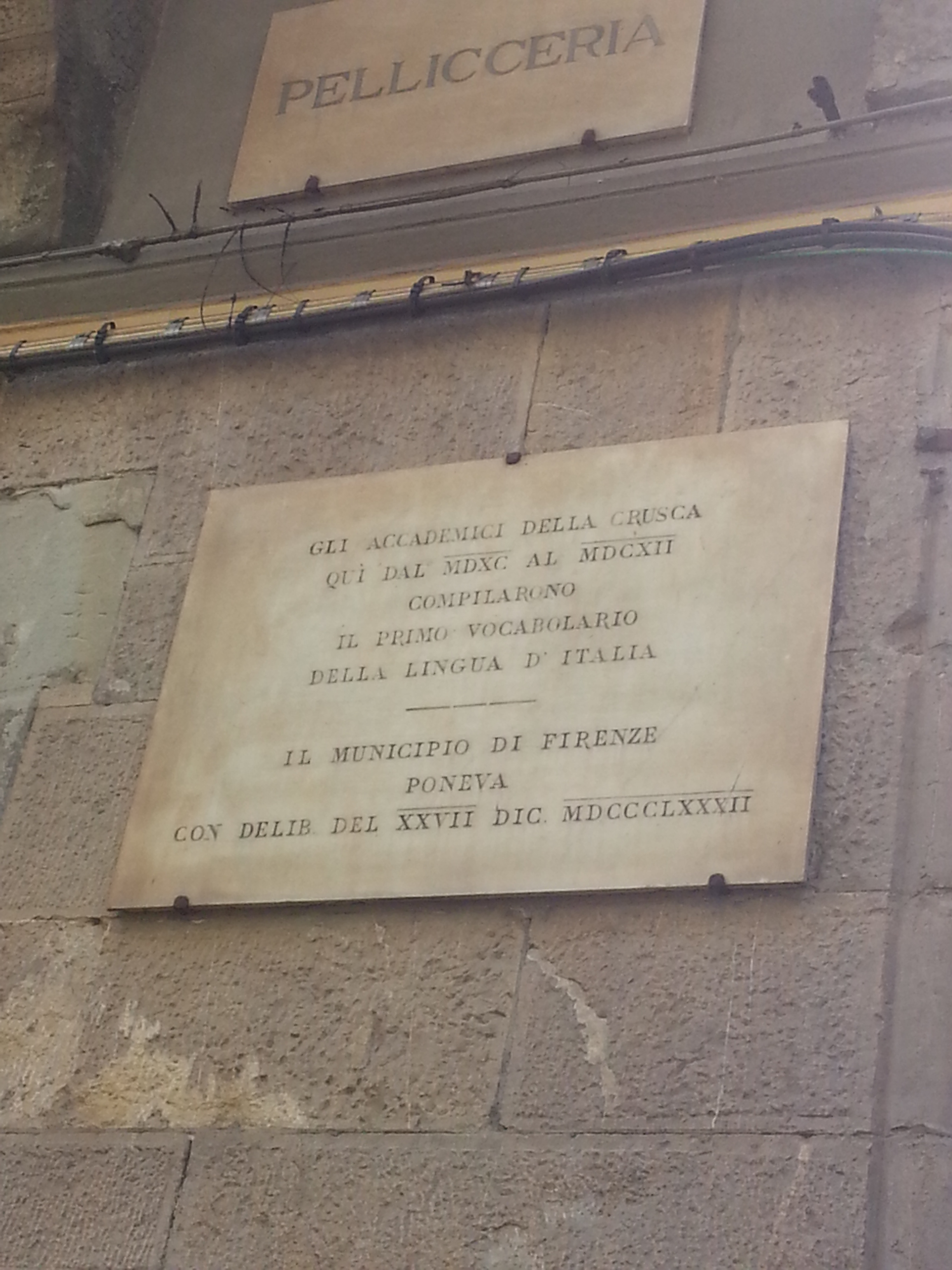
Stone plaque commemorating the first Vocabolario in via Pellicceria, Florence, near the Palazzo di Parte Guelfa

In 1583 the Accademia della Crusca was founded in Florence with the aim of codifying the Tuscan dialect and producing a comprehensive dictionary, drawing mainly on the lexicon of canonical literary texts from Florentine authors of the 'golden age' in the fourteenth century, such as Dante, Petrarca and Boccaccio. Work on the Vocabolario was begun in 1591 thanks to Lionardo Salviati's interest in philology. His search for words extended beyond the published works of great writers to include the unedited manuscript texts held in the collections of the various Florentine academies; he also compiled usage from writers after the golden age, including Lorenzo de' Medici, Francesco Berni, Niccolò Machiavelli, and, indeed, from his own writing. He also drew on non-Florentine sources such as Pietro Bembo and Ludovico Ariosto. The work was edited entirely in Florence – eventually, thirty six academicians were working full time on it – although the printing was done in Venice under the supervision of the Accademia's secretary, it:Bastiano de' Rossi.

The original title for the work was Vocabolario della lingua toscana (1608) However when it was in its final stages of development and a request for permission to print had already been sent, a lengthy discussion started among the academicians as to whether a different title should be used. Failing to reach unanimity on this, they eventually adopted the neutral title Vocabolario degli Accademici della Crusca along with the subtitle As derived from the writers and usage of the city of Florence. The original title was retained however on the licence to print granted by the Republic of Venice in January 1611.

== First edition ==
The editio princeps was published in 1612. The work was innovative because it was one of the first examples of organising entries in alphabetical order rather than by topic, as then became the norm for this kind of book. In other respects too, it was organised differently from sixteenth-century lexicons, with less distinction between the language of prose and the language of poetry, as well as fewer references to regional uses and grammatical issues. In terms of etymology the only words analysed are those which are courteous and relevant ("che abbiano gentilezza e sieno a proposito"). As far as lemmas are concerned, there were a great many local Florentine forms, as well as a number of latinisms. Among the items not included were terms either already in common use or particularly obscure. Technical and scientific terms had only brief summary descriptions. The individual entries have a standard form: the definitions of concrete nouns consist of a single synonym, while abstract nouns have a larger number; homonyms from different parts are labelled as such, and participle forms are included in the entry for their infinitives unless there is a clear reason for placing them separately.

Despite criticisms of the archaic Tuscan dialect, the Vocabolario became widely established both in Italy and abroad; its superiority over earlier lexicons lay primarily in the way it was organised, and in the large number of supporting quotations it provided for each entry, highly unusual in those days.

== Second edition ==
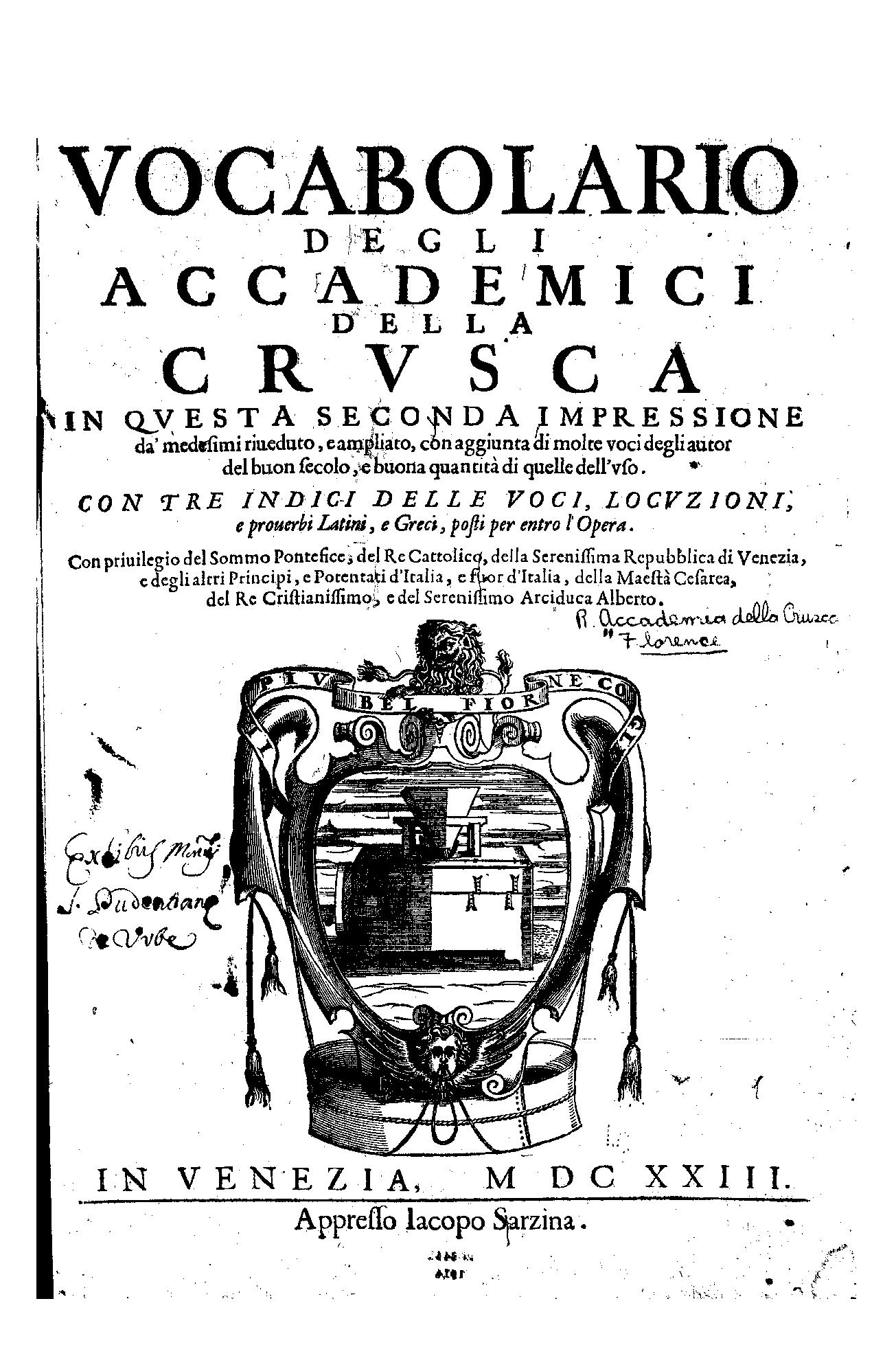
Frontispiece of the second edition (1623).

The second edition, also edited by Bastiano de' Rossi, was published in Venice in 1623. It was largely a reprint of the first edition, with some added material from more recent authors such as Annibal Caro, Lorenzo de' Medici, Michelangelo, Claudio Tolomei, it:Ludovico Martelli and it:Bernardo Segni. It contained a greater number of abstract nouns than the first edition, and provided an improved approach to article structure, avoiding clumsy or inconvenient cross-references.

== Third edition ==
The third edition was published in three volumes in Florence itself in 1691. It tried to take into account some of the criticisms levelled against the first edition.

- it introduced the note va ("voce antica" = "obsolete term") to indicate words which were included because of their historical importance rather than because of their relevance as examples to follow
- the list of authors used as sources for the entries was widened considerably and included more recent ones
- the number of articles dealing with scientific terms was increased, using works such as Galileo's Dialogue Concerning the Two Chief World Systems as sources. Francesco Redi did a lot of work in this field, although he also invented a fictitious source, one 'Sandro da Pippozzo', to support some of his entries). Other contributors included Lorenzo Magalotti and Prince Leopoldo de' Medici, who introduced entries related to hunting, military architecture and navy as a result of his own fieldwork.
- suffixes and modified forms were added to the lemmas.
- not all entries relied on author citations, meaning that effectively items were included on the simple authority of the Accademia della Crusca itself rather than on literary precedent.
- numerous loanwords and terms in common use were included.

== Fourth edition ==
The fourth edition came out in Florence in six volumes between 1729 and 1738, edited by Domenico Maria Manni. The range of writers used as references was extended to include Iacopo Sannazaro, Benvenuto Cellini, Benedetto Menzini and. Lorenzo Lippi.

In comparison with the previous edition:

- a number of common words relating to farming were added, as were references to families of words
- loan-words were included with author citations
- questions of register and style were addressed
- scientific terms borrowed from Latin or Greek were included
- there was a much greater range of technical and scientific terms

== Fifth edition ==
During the Napoleonic period Tuscany was ruled first as the Kingdom of Etruria and then annexed to France (1807–1814). During this time the official language of government was French. Nevertheless on 9 April 1809 Napoleon issued a decree allowing Florentines to use their native language alongside French, in the courts, legal documents and private correspondence. In addition it announced the establishment of an annual prize of 500 napoleoni to authors whose works best contributed to maintaining the Italian language in all its purity.

A further decree on 9 January 1811 re-established the Accademia della Crusca and charged it specifically with revising the dictionary as well as with preserving the purity of the language. Academicians were to be paid an annual stipend of 500 franchi, or 1,000 francs if they were working on the dictionary, while 1,200 was provided for the secretary. Nevertheless the work remained incomplete: publication stopped after the letter "O", which ended when the entry for 'ozono' was reached in 1923.

== 20th century ==
From 1955 the plan of work changed, and the aim became to produce a great historical dictionary that would include the 'treasures' of the Italian language. In 1965 the work of producing the historical dictionary was split off from the Accademia and a separate 'Opera del Vocabolario' was set up. A law of 6 January 1983 established the Opera del Vocabolario as an institute of the National Research Council, working on the language up to 1375, while the Accademia itself now focuses on the modern language.
