= Louis I of Anhalt-Köthen =

German prince

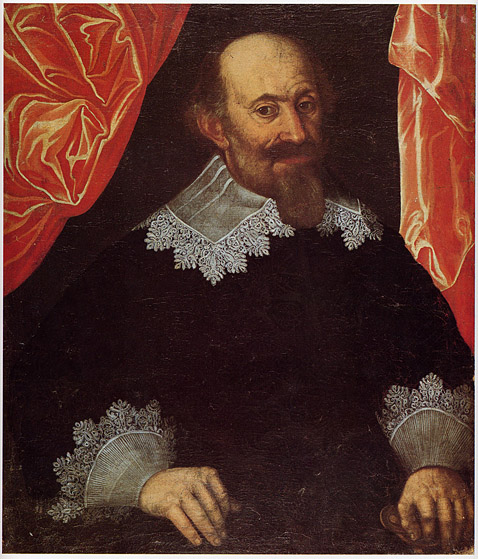
Louis I, Prince of Anhalt-Köthen.

Louis I of Anhalt-Köthen (German: Ludwig I., Fürst von Anhalt-Köthen; 17 June 1579 in Dessau – 7 January 1650 in Köthen), was a German prince of the House of Ascania and ruler of the unified principality of Anhalt. From 1603, he was ruler of the principality of Anhalt-Köthen. He was also a founder of the first German Society (the Fruitbearing Society).

Louis was the seventh son of Joachim Ernest, Prince of Anhalt, but fifth-born son of his second wife Eleonore, daughter of Christoph, Duke of Württemberg.

== Life ==
After the death of his father in 1586, Louis inherited the principality of Anhalt jointly with his half- and full brothers. The youngest of all the sons of Joachim Ernest who survived to adulthood, he grew up in Dessau at the court of his older brother and guardian, John George I.

From 1596 to 1597 the seventeen-year-old Louis made a Grand Tour of Europe by traveling to Great Britain, France, and the Netherlands. By the beginning of 1598 he was in Switzerland, then visited Austria, Hungary, and Italy, where he remained until 1602. During a stay in Florence, Louis was accepted (with the assistance of his Italian tutor Bastiano de' Rossi) as the first German member of the Accademia della Crusca, in which he was known by the name "L'Acceso."

In 1603 a formal division of the principality of Anhalt was agreed upon by the surviving co-rulers. Louis received Köthen, where he took up his principal residence.

Militarily and politically Louis remained cautious, preferring to promote agriculture vigorously. He built his new Schloss (official residence) in Italian style and had his court adopt Italian manners. With his financial support, a major educational initiative was launched in Köthen in 1619 under the auspices of Wolfgang Ratke. Problems with the local clergy led to Ratke's imprisonment for eight months, and Louis left this project incomplete.

On the occasion of the funeral of his sister Dorothea Maria, Duchess of Saxe-Weimar, on 24 August 1617, the seneschal Kaspar von Teutleben proposed the establishment of a society on the model of the Accademia della Crusca. The creation of the Fruitbearing Society was decided upon and Louis was appointed its first leader, a post he held until his death. As a member, was known as Der Nährende (the nourisher) and used the Latin motto "Vita mihi Christ, morse lucrum."

During the Thirty Years' War, King Gustavus Adolphus of Sweden transferred the governorship of the Dioceses of Magdeburg and Halberstadt to Louis. This provoked the anger of Count Axel Oxenstierna, who desired that post. This was also a source of tension in the Fruitbearing Society, because Oxenstierna was a member.

== Marriages and Issue ==
In Rheda on 31 October 1606 Louis married Countess Amöena Amalie of Bentheim-Steinfurt, 19 March 1586 – d. Oldenburg, 8 September 1625), daughter of Arnold III, Count of Bentheim-Steinfurt-Tecklenburg-Limburg, and younger sister of Anna, the wife of Prince Christian I of Anhalt-Bernburg, Louis's older brother. They had two children:

1. Louis, Hereditary Prince of Anhalt-Köthen (born Köthen, 19 October 1607 – d. Köthen, 15 March 1624).
2. Louise Amöena (born Köthen, 28 November 1609 – d. Harderwijk, Gelderland, 26 March 1625).

The death of his only son left Louis without an heir, but it was only after the death of his wife eighteen months later that he decided to find a new wife who bore the needed heir to his principality.

In Detmold on 12 September 1626 Louis married for a second time to Countess Sophie of Lippe (born Detmold, 16 August 1599 – d. Köthen, 19 March 1654), daughter of Simon VI, Count of Lippe. They had two children:

1. Amalie Louise (born Köthen, 29 July 1634 – d. Köthen, 3 October 1635).
2. William Louis, Prince of Anhalt-Köthen (born Köthen, 3 August 1638 – d. Köthen, 13 April 1665).

== Sources ==
- Gantet, Claire (2022). "L'histoire des savoirs: un fleuve sans rivage". Francia. 49: Forschungen zur westeuropäischen Geschichte. Deutsches Historisches Institut Paris.

Preceded by Joachim Ernest	Prince of Anhalt with John George I, Christian I, Bernhard (until 1596), Augustus, Rudolph and John Ernest (until 1601); 1586–1603	Succeeded by Principality partitioned in Anhalt-Dessau, Anhalt-Bernburg, Anhalt-Plötzkau, Anhalt-Zerbst and Anhalt-Köthen
Preceded by Principality (re-)created	Prince of Anhalt-Köthen; 1603–1650	Succeeded by William Louis
Preceded by New Organization	Head of the Fruitbearing Society; 1617–1650	Succeeded by Wilhelm, Duke of Saxe-Weimar
