= Salvino D'Armati =

Fictional inventor of eyeglasses

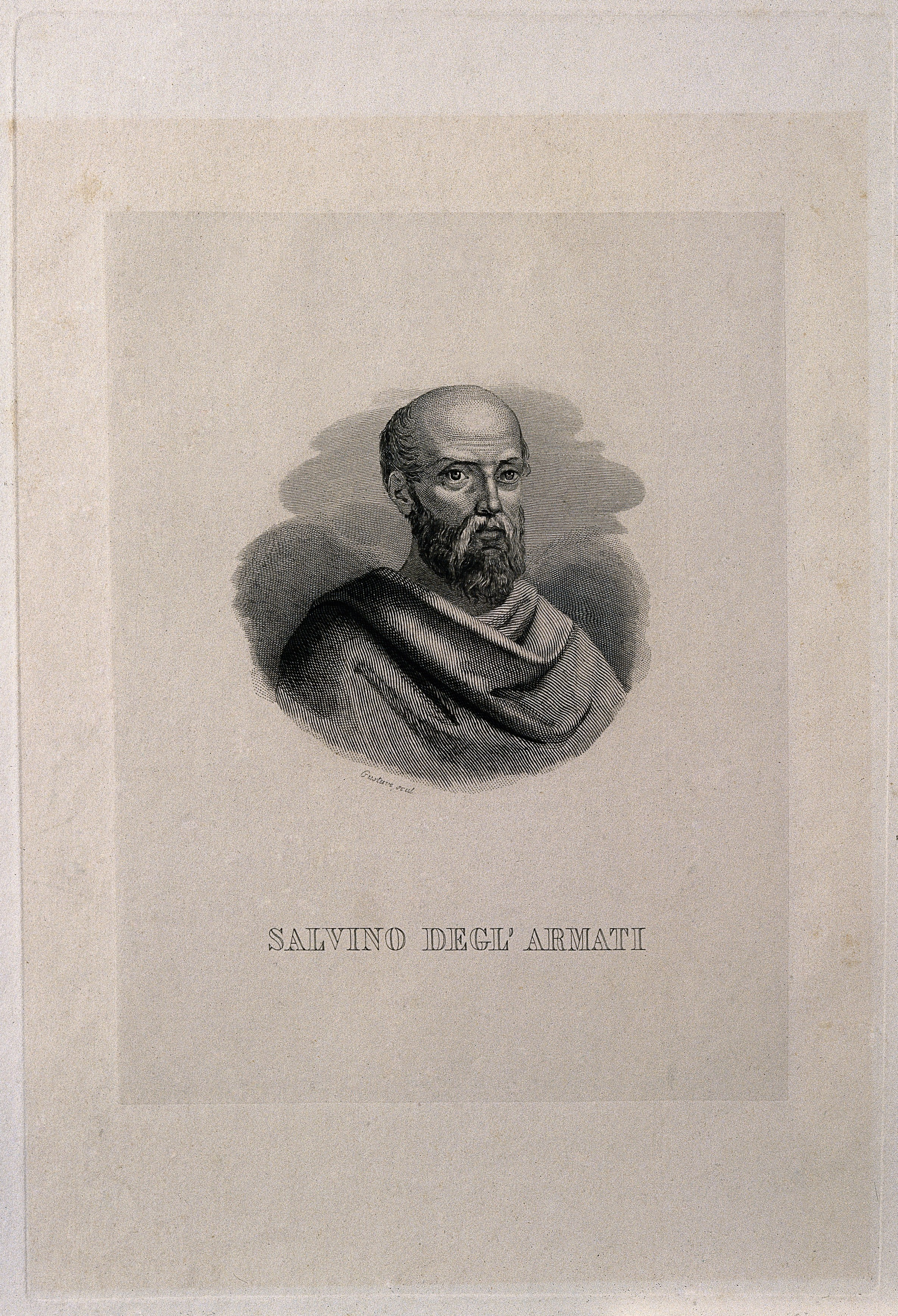
Salvino D'Armati

Salvino D'Armato degli Armati of Florence is sometimes credited with the invention of eyeglasses in the 13th century, however it has been shown that this claim was a hoax, and that there was no member of the Armati family with that name at the time.

The earliest mention of Salvino degli Armati as the inventor of eyeglasses occurred in 1684. Ferdinando Leopoldo del Migliore (1628–1696) of Florence published a book, Firenze città noblissima illustrata (Florence, Most Noble City, illustrated). In this book, del Migliore claimed to own a burial register of the Church of Santa Maria Maggiore, which had recently been renovated. This register supposedly recorded Armati's epitaph as follows:

Original : "Qui diace Salvino d'Armato degl'Armati di Fir., Inventor degl'occhiali. Dio gli perdoni la peccata. Anno D. MCCCXVII"

Translation : "Here lies Salvino, son of Armato degli Armati of Florence, inventor of eyeglasses. May God forgive his sins. A.D. 1317."

Del Migliore never produced this burial register, and it has never been found. Del Migliore claimed that D'Armati's tomb and its epitaph was obliterated during the church's restoration.

In 1920, the Italian scholar Isidoro del Lungo (1841–1927) pointed out (1) that nowhere else had a "Salvino degli Armati" been credited with being the inventor of eyeglasses, (2) that in the 14th century, the epitaph would have read "le peccata", not "la peccata", and most importantly, (3) that the term "inventor" did not exist in the Florentine vernacular during the 14th century. Del Lungo also found that a "Salvino degli Armati" had died in 1340, but he had been a humble artisan who had never dealt with eyeglasses.

Lack of evidence did not discourage the spreading of this claim about Salvino degli Armati. In 1738, Domenico Maria Manni (1690–1788) of Florence published a book on the subject: Degli occhiali naso inventati da Salvino Armati, gentiluomo fiorentino. Trattato istorico (Historical Treatise on Eyeglasses, Invented by Salvino Armati, Florentine Gentleman). However, critics pointed out that it was impossible to reconcile a "Salvino Armati" with the known genealogy of the Armati family of Florence around 1286, the period when eyeglasses were invented.

Again, despite the lack of evidence, the historian Pasquale Villari composed and had posted in Florence in 1855 a plaque honoring Salvino degli Armati as the inventor of eyeglasses. (The plaque has since been removed.) Furthermore, between 1850 and 1900, a portrait head of Salvino degli Armati with a plaque containing his epitaph was mounted in the chapel of the Orlandini de Beccuto family of the Church of Santa Maria Maggiore.

In the twentieth century, efforts were made to expose as a hoax the claim that Salvino degli Armati invented eyeglasses: The Dizionario enciclopedico italiano (1955), vol. 1, lists Salvino degli Armati together with an exposure of del Migliore's false claim. Furthermore, Vasco Ronchi, an Italian physicist who specialized in optics, also published an article on the subject as did the American historian of science Edward Rosen and the Italian professor of ophthalmology Giuseppe Albertotti (1851–1936).
