= Louis of Anhalt-Köthen (the Younger) =

German prince

Louis of Anhalt-Köthen, called The Younger (19 October 1607, in Köthen – 15 March 1624, in Köthen), was a German prince of the House of Ascania and heir to the principality of Anhalt-Köthen.

He was the only son of Louis I, Prince of Anhalt-Köthen, by his first wife Amöena Amalie, daughter of Arnold III, Count of Bentheim-Steinfurt-Tecklenburg-Limburg.

== Life ==
A highly gifted boy, he was considered by contemporary witnesses to be "the hope for the political future of his country" (in the words of Kaspar von Teutleben).

After the creation of the Fruitbearing Society on 24 August 1617 his father, its first leader, accepted him as a member. As an emblem, he chose for him a "watermelon cut into little pieces".

The participation of Louis the Younger in the Académie des parfaits amants in Köthen on 1 March 1624 is doubtful, because he died fourteen days later, on 15 March, at the age of sixteen.
