= Santa Maria Sopra Porta, Florence =

Church building in Florence, Italy

Coordinates: 43°46′10.33″N 11°15′13.27″E

Santa Maria Sopra Porta is a small, former Roman Catholic church, built in rustic stone Romanesque style, located on Via Pellicceria, Florence, region of Tuscany, Italy. It now houses the library of the Palazzo di Parte Guelfa.

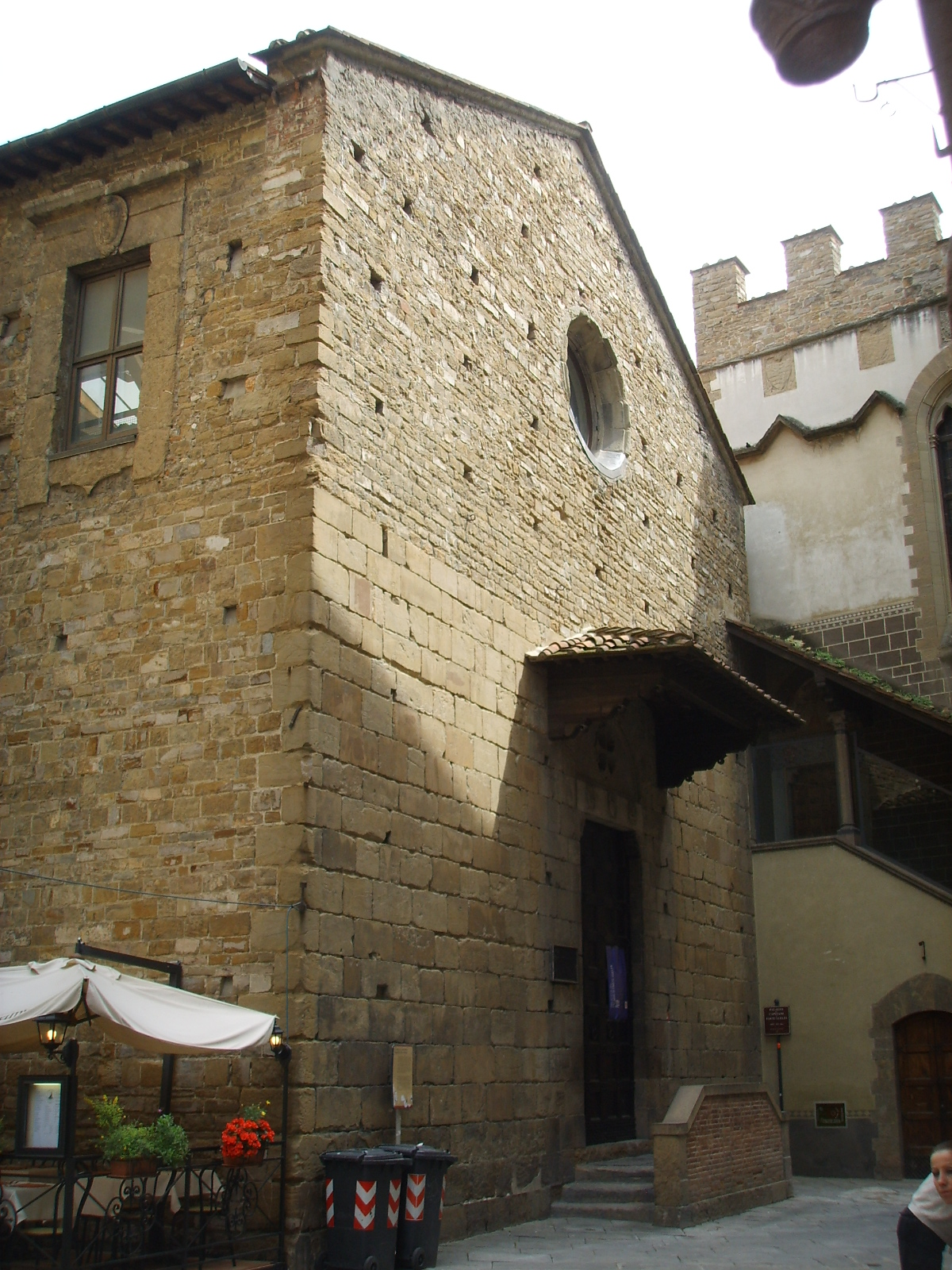
Santa Maria Sopra Porta

== History ==
The church was founded around the year 1038, but suffered from devastating fires in 1304 and 1706, that destroyed most of the interior artworks.
