= Bastiano de' Rossi =

Italian philologist

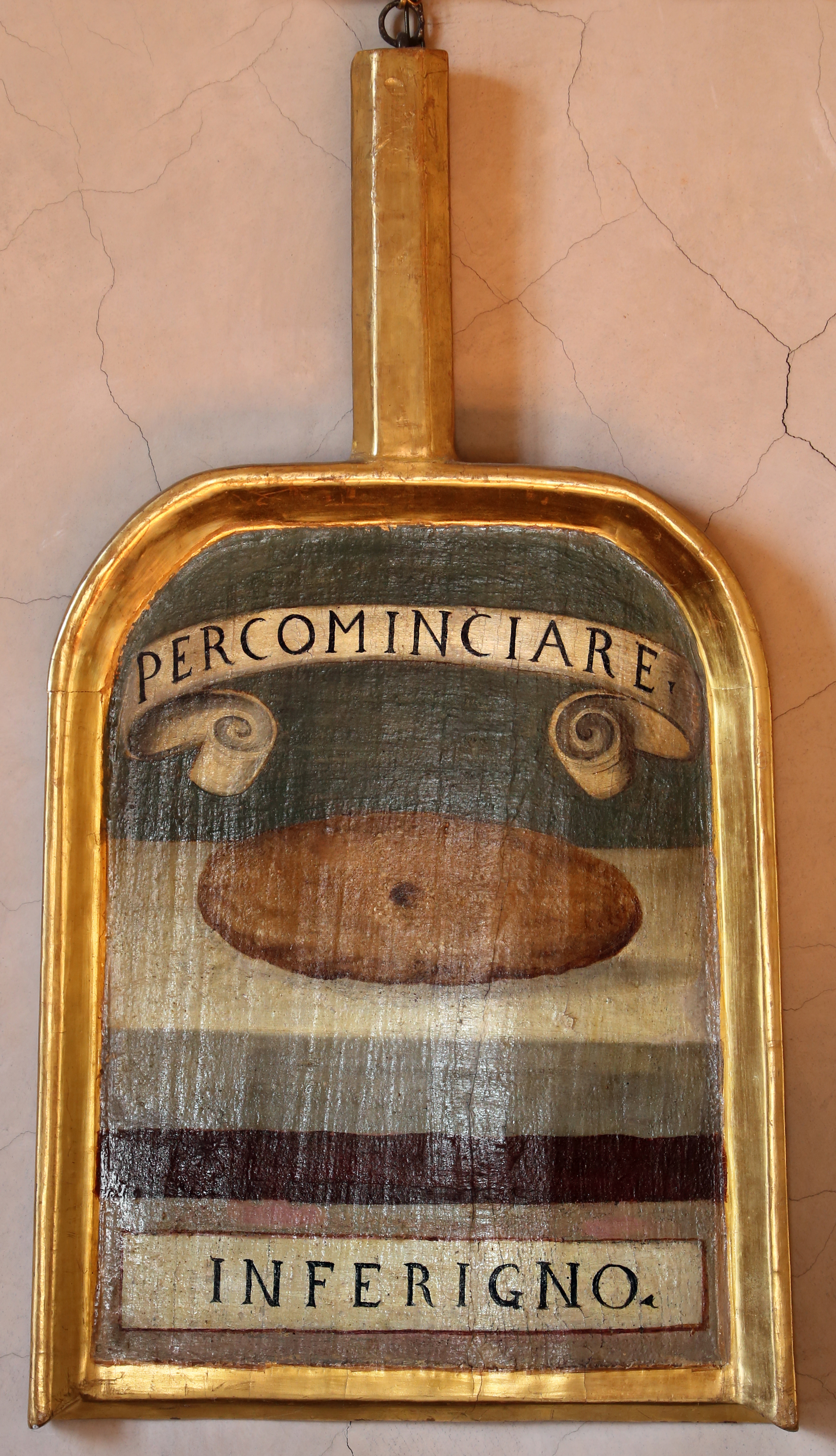
Pala from the Crusca with Rossi's nickname

Bastiano de' Rossi (1556–1627), nicknamed l'Inferigno, was an Italian philologist and writer.

He was born in San Casciano in Val di Pesa in Tuscany. Bastiano was one of the founders of the Accademia della Crusca, along with Bernardo Canigiani, Antonio Francesco Grazzini, and Lionardo Salviati. As the first secretary of the organization, he helped shepherd the first volumes of the dictionary. His nickname refers to a bread made with unsifted flour containing bran (Italian: crusca). Subsequent authors misspelled his nickname as Inferrigno, which would mean 'iron-like'. Both seem to allude to his personality, that was described as "harsh and inflexible". Bastiano published a tract condemning the language used by Torquato Tasso. The Cruscans were focused on elevating the Tuscan Italian of Dante.
