= Nicoletta Maraschio =

Italian linguist and philologist

Nicoletta Maraschio is an academic teacher of "History of Italian Language" at University of Florence. She was the first woman in charge of Accademia della Crusca, from 2008 to 2014, succeeding Francesco Sabatini.

== Biography ==
Born in Pavia in 1946, Maraschio graduated from the University of Florence, where she had begun her academic career as a professor in the Literature department. She has also been a visiting professor in the United States and in several European universities.

She is married to Paolo Caretti, professor at the Faculty of Law at the University of Florence.

Since 2001 she has been the main editor of "L'italiano in pubblico" (Franco Cesati Editore) in cooperation with Sergio Raffaeli.

== Main works ==
- Aspetti del bilinguismo albertiano nel "De Pictura", in "Rinascimento", 1972.
- Interferenze tra verbo latino e verbo volgare nel bilingue "De pictura" albertiano, in "Studi di grammatica italiana", 1974-1975.
- Lingua società e corte di una Signoria padana fra Quattro e Cinquecento, in AA.VV., Ludovico Ariosto: lingua, stile e tradizione, Milan, 1976.
- Il parlato nella speculazione linguistica del Cinquecento, in "Studi di grammatica italiana", 1977.
- La formazione italiana del grammatico gallese J.D.Rhoesus (Rhys), in "Studi di grammatica italiana", 1980.
- Problemi linguistici e televisione, numero speciale di "Informazione radio tv", 1980, in cooperation with Emanuela Cresti, Massimo Moneglia, Enrico Paradisi and Stefania Stefanelli.
- L'italiano del doppiaggio, in La lingua italiana in movimento, Accademia della Crusca, Florence 1982.
- Appunti per uno studio della punteggiatura, in Studi di linguistica italiana per Giovanni Nencioni.
- Il Lombardelli, il Salviati e il vocabolario, in "Studi linguistici italiani", 1984.
- Scrittura e pronuncia nel pensiero linguistico di Lionardo Salviati, in AA.VV., La Crusca nella tradizione letteraria e linguistica italiana, Florence 1985.
- Radio e televisione a scuola, in AA.VV, Lingua e linguaggio, Siena 1987.
- Attualità e storicità dell'italiano (in cooperation with Giovanni Nencioni), in Educazione linguistica di base e programmazione, Teramo 1987.
- La norma oggi e ieri, in " Le lingue del mondo", 1988.
- Il problema della lingua, in Storia d'Italia, by Ruggiero Romano, Fabbri-Bompiani edition, Milan 1989.
- Siena e lo studio della fonetica nel Cinquecento, in Tra Rinascimento e strutture attuali. Saggi di linguistica italiana (by Luciano Giannelli, Nicoletta Maraschio, Teresa Poggi Salani e Massimo Vedovelli), I SILFI Conference (Siena, March 1989), Turin 1991.
- L'insegnamento della lingua toscana (in cooperation with Teresa Poggi Salani), in AA.VV., L'università di Siena 750 anni di storia, Siena 1991.
- Storia e teoria dell'interpunzione, Atti del Convegno Internazionale di studi (Firenze, May 1988), by Emanuela Cresti, Nicoletta Maraschio and Luca Toschi, Rome, Bulzoni, 1992.
- La sceneggiatura cinematografica tra teatro e letteratura: Pratolini sceneggiatore, in AA.VV, Gli italiani scritti, Florence 1992.
- Pirandello e i Taviani, in Il Cinema e Pirandello (Atti del Convegno di Pavia 8-10 novembre 1990), by M. Antonietta Grignani, Florence 1992.
- Parole e forme del Decameron. Elementi di continuità e di frattura dal fiorentino del Trecento all'italiano contemporaneo, Florence 1992.
- Grafia e ortografia. Formazione, codificazione, diffusione del sistema grafico italiano, Florence 1992.
- Trattati di fonetica del Cinquecento, Florence 1992.
- Grafia e ortografia: evoluzione e codificazione, by Luca Serianni and Pietro Trifone, Storia della lingua italiana, I, I luoghi della codificazione, Einaudi, Turin 1993.
- Gli italiani trasmessi: la radio (in cooperation with E. Cresti), report on meeting at Accademia della Crusca (May 13–14), in "La Crusca per voi", 1994.
- Pirandello sceneggiatore: appunti linguistici, in AA.VV., Pirandello e la lingua, Milan, Mursia, 1994.
- Lingua e letteratura a Siena dal Cinquecento al Settecento, by Luciano Giannelli, Nicoletta Maraschio, Teresa Poggi Salani, Florence 1994.
- Appunti su lessico e politica, in Linguaggio e politica, by Carla Ciseri Montemagno, Florence, Le Monnier, 1995.
- Latino e volgare nei trattati di Piero, in Piero della Francesca tra arte e scienza, by M. Dalai Emiliani and V. Curzi, Venice, Marsilio 1996.
- Una giornata radiofonica: osservazioni linguistiche, in Gli italiani trasmessi: la radio, Florence, Accademia della Crusca 1997.
- Storia della lingua italiana e storia letteraria. I ASLI meeting, by N. Maraschio e T. Poggi Salani, Florence, Cesati, 1998.
- Le lingue della chiesa. Testi e documenti dalle Origini ai nostri giorni, by N. Maraschio and T. Matarrese, Pescara, Libreria dell'Università, 1998.
- Storia della lingua italiana, in La linguistica italiana alle soglie del 2000 (1987-1997), by C. Lavinio, SLI Bulzoni, Rome 2002, pp. 21–93.La Nazione
- Ricordo di una maestra, in Testimonianze per Maria Corti, by Anna Dolfi, Bulzoni, Rome, 2005, pp. 91–93.
- Il “De Pictura” albertiano nelle traduzioni cinquecentesche di Lodovico Domenichi e di Cosimo Bartoli, in M. Biffi, O. Calabrese, L. Salibra, Italia linguistica. Discorsi di scritto e di parlato. Nuovi studi di Linguistica italiana per Giovanni Nencioni, Protagon, Siena, 2005.
