= Palazzo Canacci, Florence =

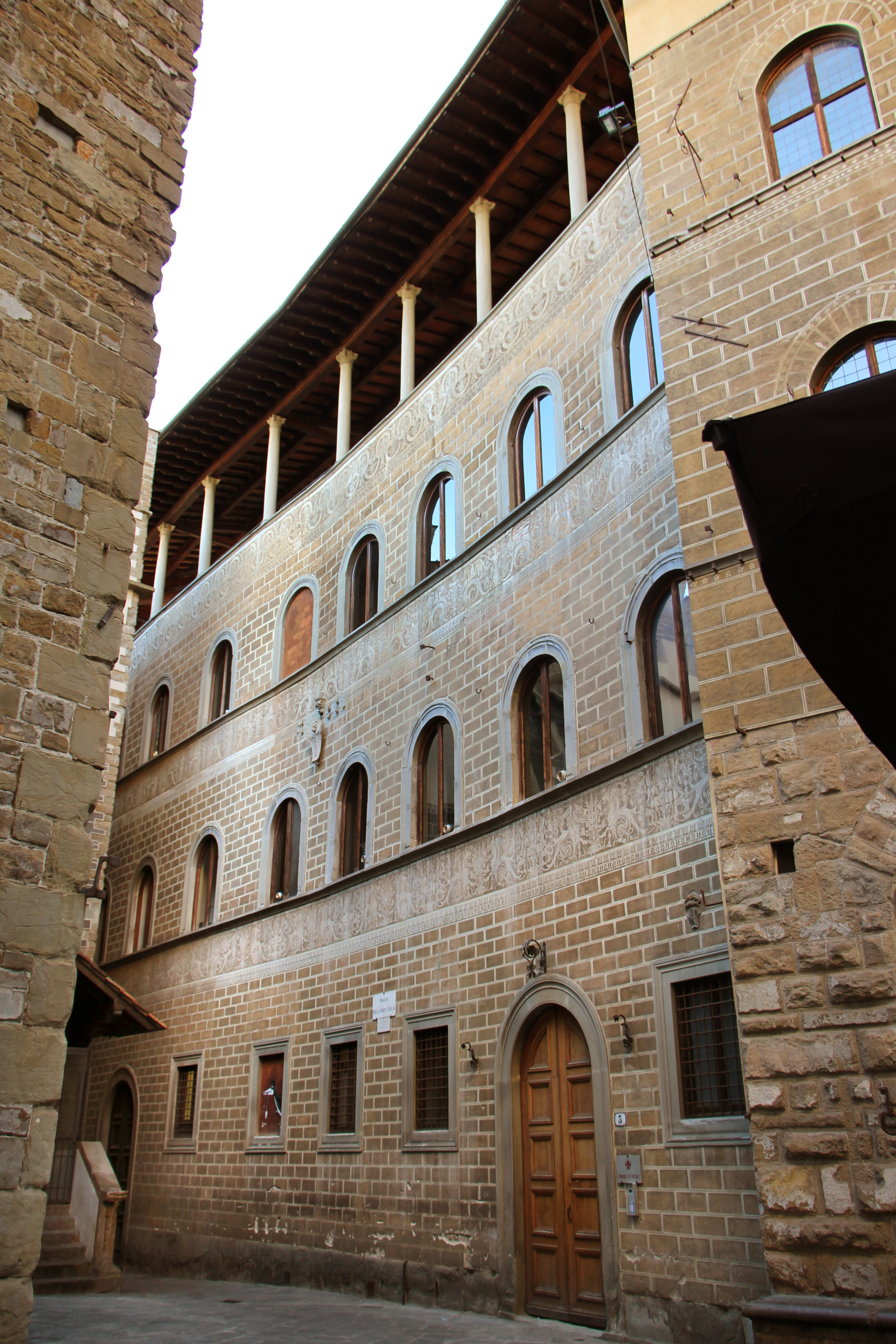
Exterior of Palace

The Palazzo Canacci, also known as Palazzo Canacci-Giandonati, is a Gothic-style palace located in Piazza di Parte Guelfa 3 in central Florence, region of Tuscany, Italy. It stand across the piazza from the former church of San Biagio, and separated by an alley from the Palazzo di Parte Guelfa.

== History ==
The palace was commissioned by the Canacci family in the second half of the 15th century. The third story of the palace contains a loggetta with columns, restored only in 1902 to its open state by Giuseppe Castellucci. The palace was once united to the Palazzo Giandonati. The facade graffiti decoration in the lower stories was added at this time. The portal has the heraldic shield of the Canacci family with a dog's head and three chains linked to a ring. The Canacci family died out in 1778 with the death of Cosimo Canacci. The palace was nearly destroyed during the urban renewal performed to create the nearby Piazza della Repubblica.

== Gallery ==
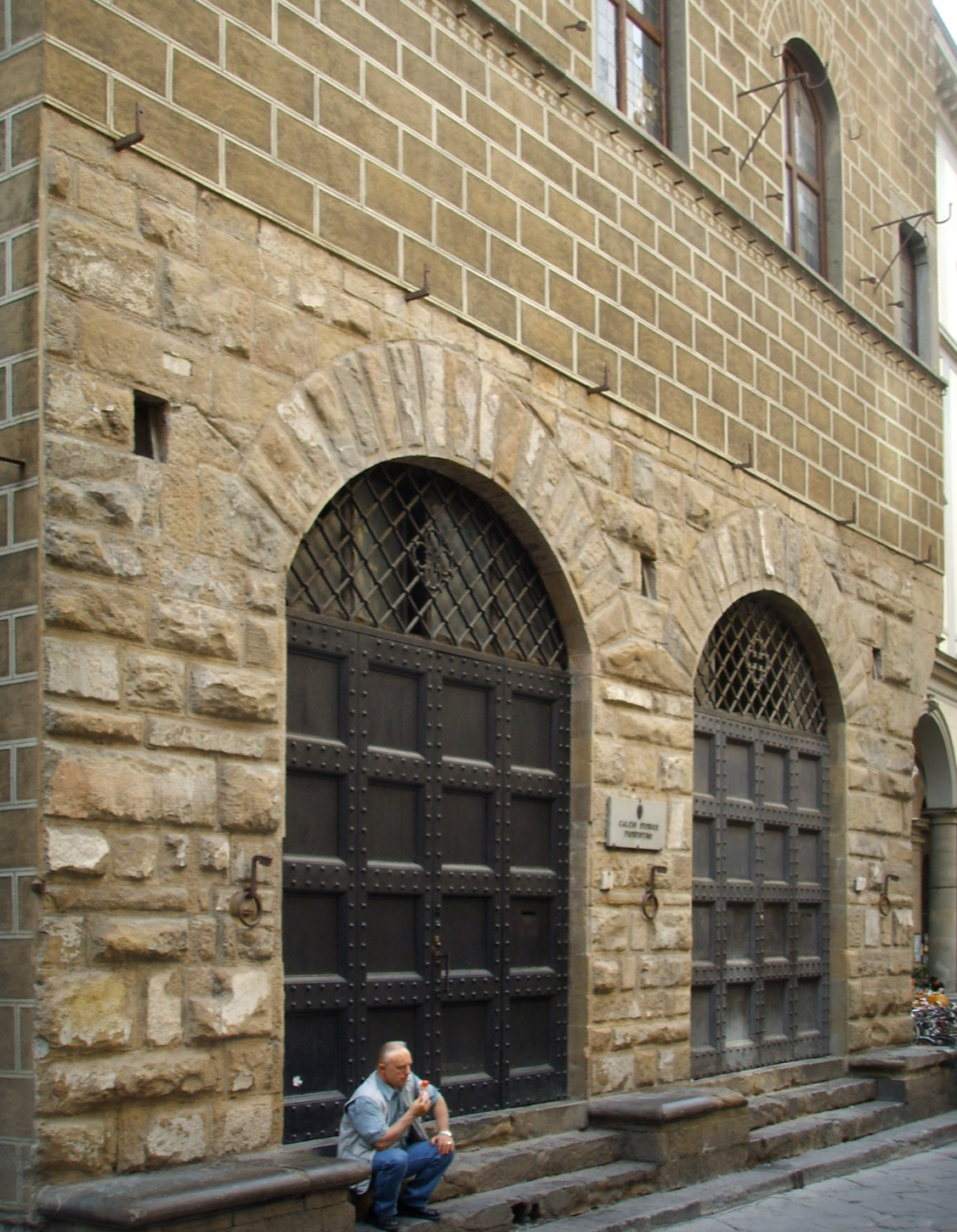
Portalof the Palazzo Giandonati

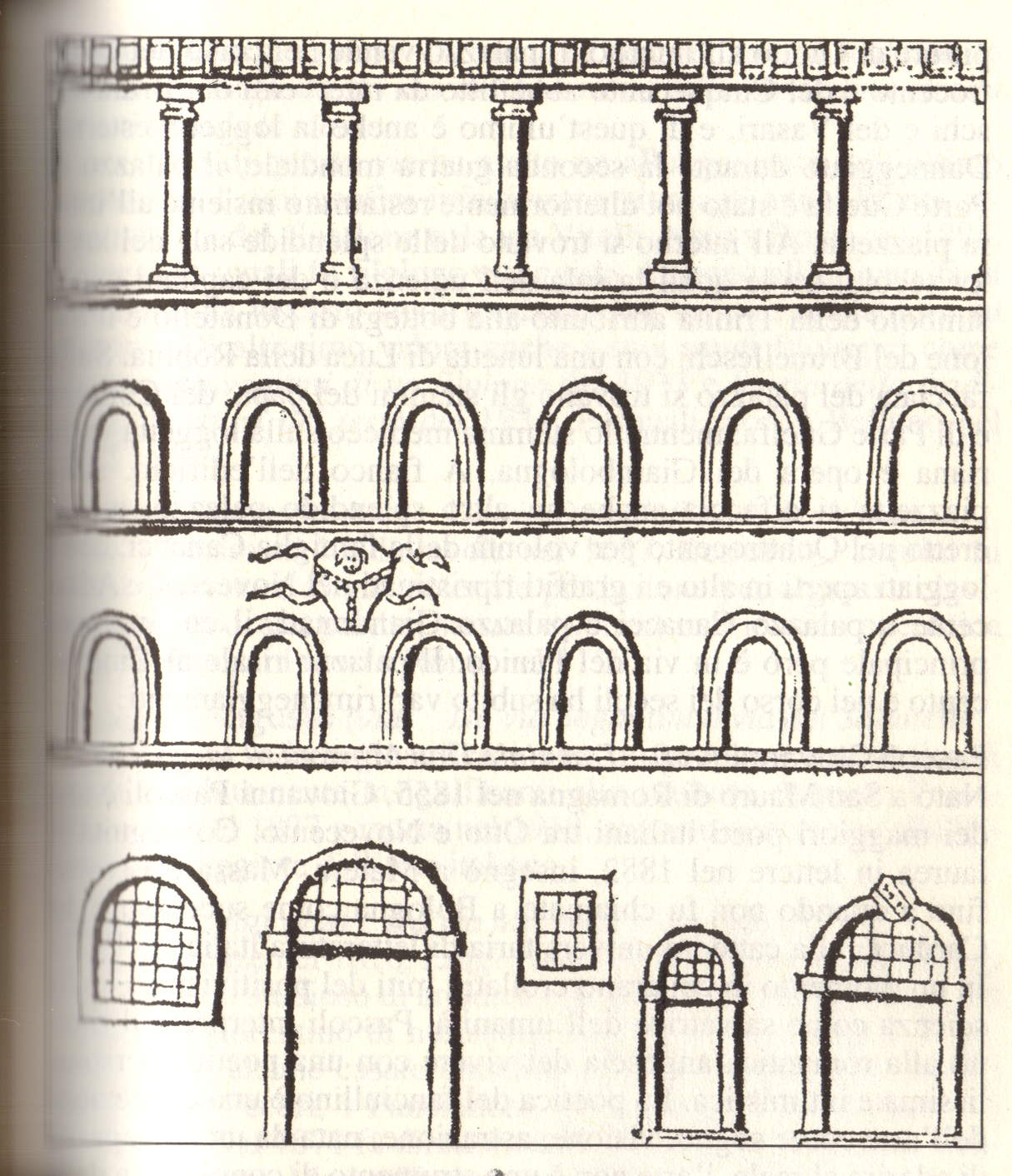
16th century depiction of the facade of the Palazzo Canacci

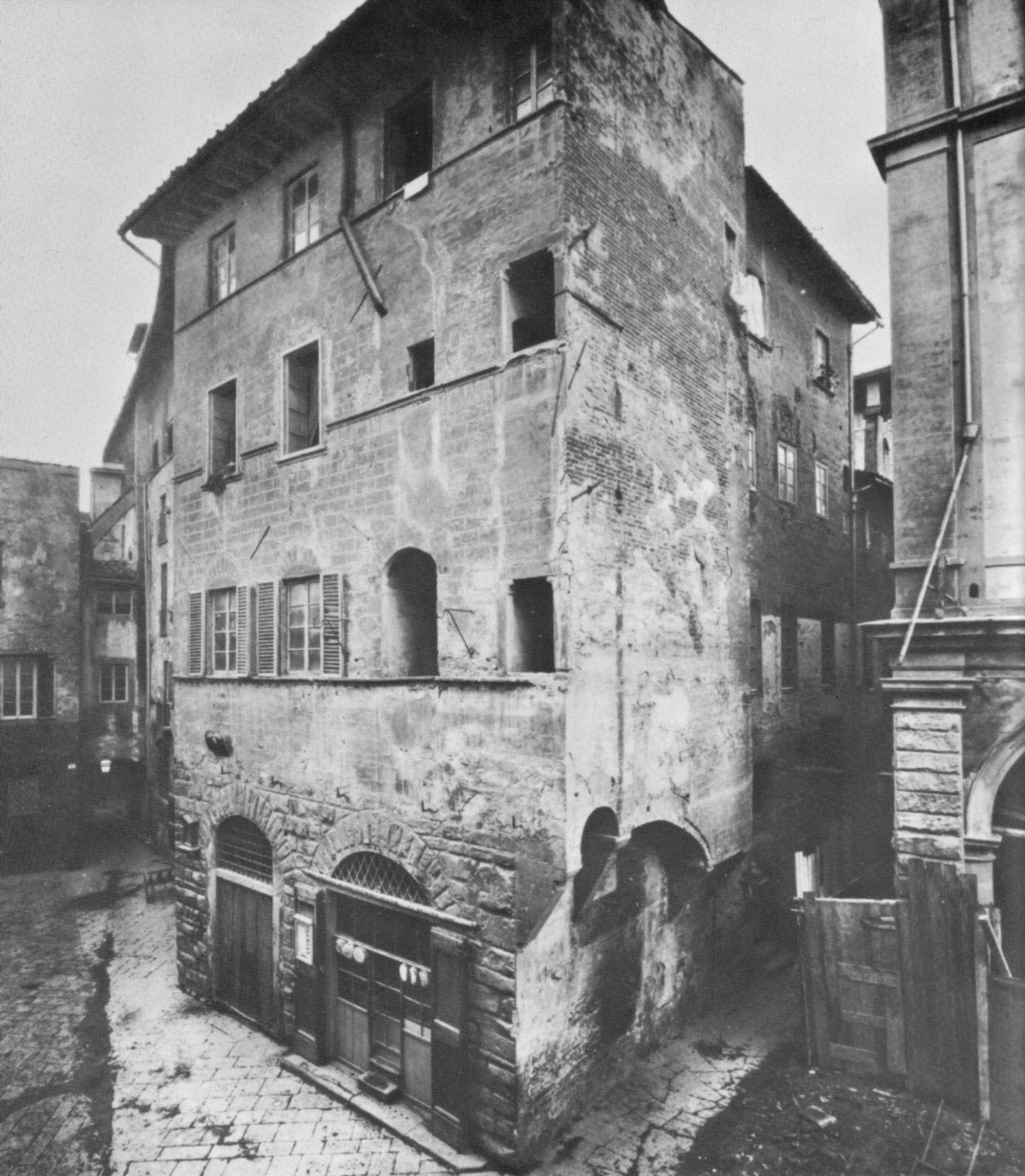
Palazzo Giandonati in 1865

== Bibliography ==
- Translated in part from Italian Wikipedia entry
- Marcello Vannucci, Splendidi palazzi di Firenze, Le Lettere, Firenze 1995.
