= Domenico Maria Manni =

Italian scholar (1690–1788)

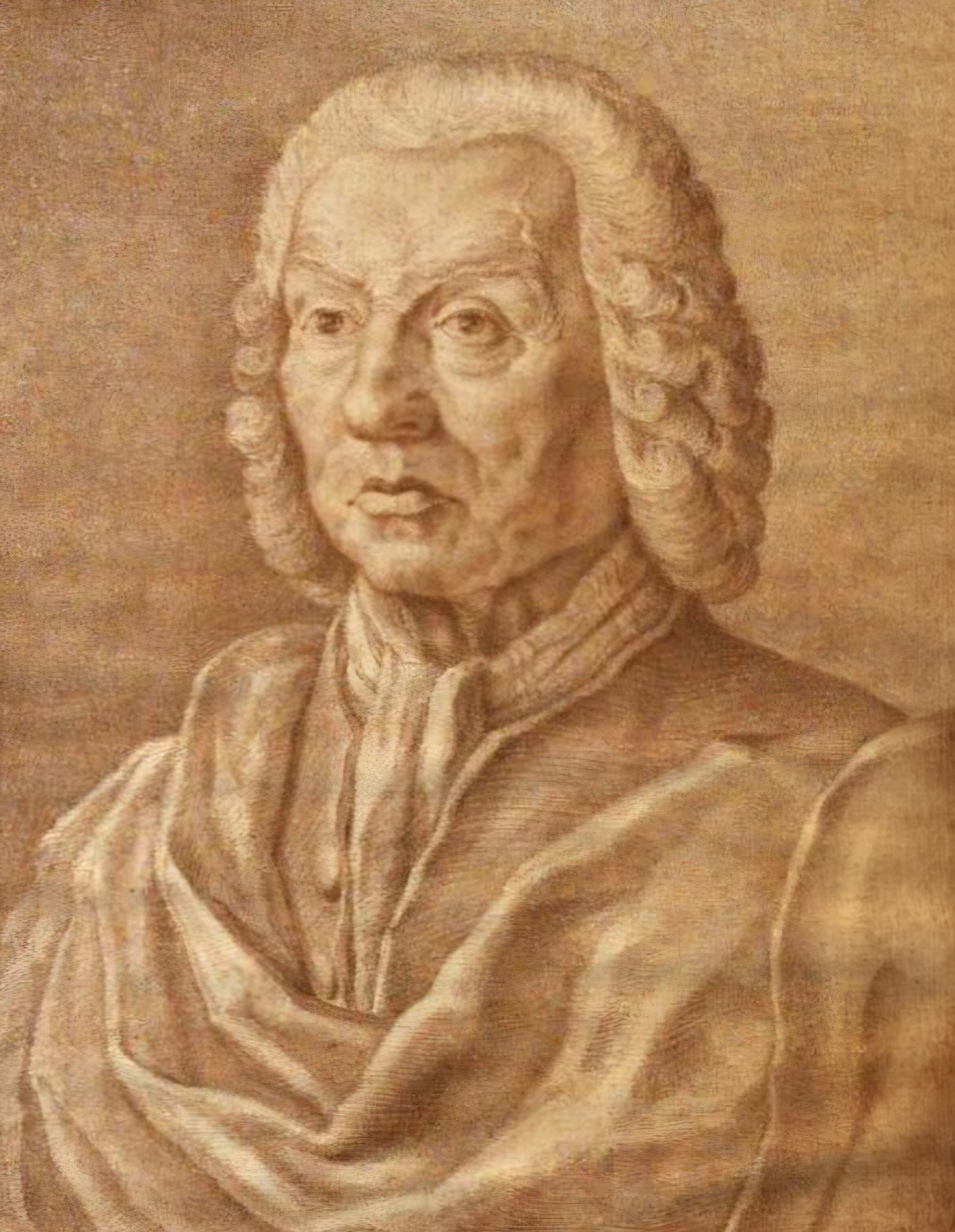
Engraved portrait of Domenico Maria Manni by Antonio Zambaldi

Domenico Maria Manni (8 April 1690 – 30 November 1788) was an Italian polymath, editor, and publisher.

== Biography ==
Domenico Maria Manni was born in Florence in April 1690. His father was a typesetter at a printer's shop. Domenico Maria became a member of the Accademia della Crusca, and Director of the Biblioteca Strozzi, and is known for his zealous drive to edit and publish works on a very wide diversity of subjects. He edited early Italian texts and published works of antiquarian and literary scholarship, including an important Istoria del Decamerone (1742). His Veglie piacevoli, ovvero notizie de' più bizzarri e giocondi uomini toscani, in the style of Boccaccio, was dismissed by Giuseppe Marc'Antonio Baretti.

== Works ==
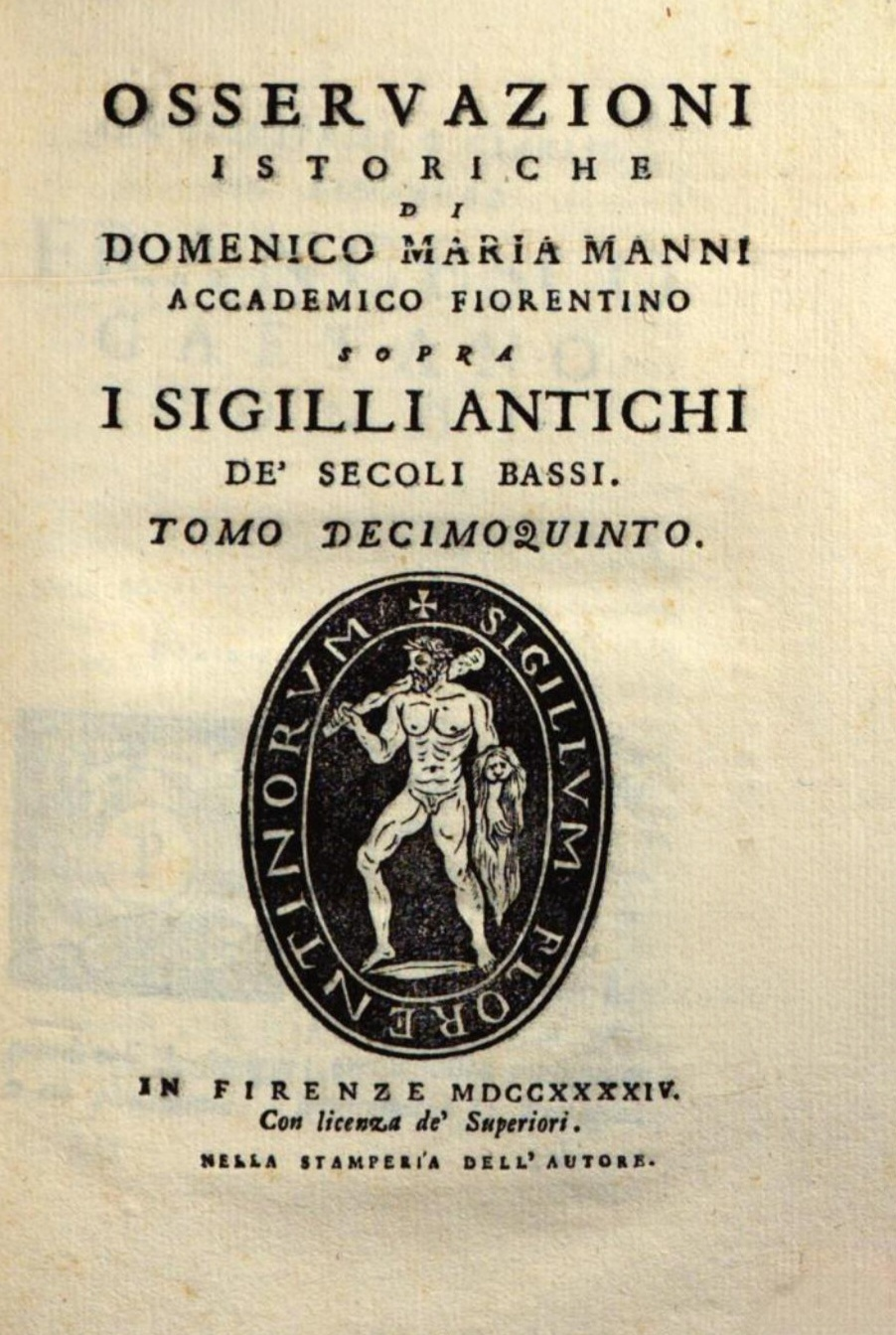
Domenico Maria Manni, Osservazioni istoriche sopra i sigilli antichi de' secoli bassi, Florence, 1744

- Serie dei senatori fiorentini (1722)
- Cronica di Firenze di Donato Velluti, dall’anno 1300, in circa, fino al 1370, Florence, 1731 (on-line)
- Lezioni di lingua toscana, by Domenico Maria Manni, Florentine academic in the Archbishop's Seminary of Florence,: Published by Pietro Gaetano Viviani, Florence, 1737 with dedications to the Duke of Savoy and the Florentine bishop, Giuseppe Maria Martelli.
- Degli occhiali da naso inventati da Salvino Armati, Firenze: Antonio Maria Albizzini, 1738 ()
- Osservazioni istoriche sopra i sigilli antichi de' secoli bassi, 37 voll., 1739-86.
- Degli occhiali da naso inventati da Salvino Armati (in Italian). Firenze: Antonio Maria Albizzini. 1738.
- Istoria del Decamerone di Giovanni Boccaccio, Florence, 1742 (on-line)
- Istoria degli anni santi. Florence: G. Battista Stecchi, 1750 (on-line)
- Notizie de' professori del disegno da Cimabue in qua, Opere di Filippo Baldinucci, Florence: per Gio. Batista Stecchi e Anton Giuseppe Pagani, 1767-1774 ()
- Opere di Messer Agnolo Firenzuola fiorentino, Milan: Società tipografica de' Classici italiani, 1802 ()
- Trattato di Piero Vettori delle lodi e della coltivazione degli ulivi nuova accuratissima edizione presa da quella del 1720. citata dagli Accademici della Crusca. Colle annotazioni del dott. Giuseppe Bianchini di Prato e di Domenico M. Manni. Florence: nella stamperia di Gio. Batista Stecchi alla Condotta, 1762 ()
- Notizie istoriche intorno al Parlagio ovvero anfiteatro di Firenze. Bologna: Tommaso Colli, 1746 ()
- Le veglie piacevoli ovvero notizie de' più bizzarri e giocondi uomini toscani le quali possono servire da utile trattenimento, scritte da Domenico M. Manni. Tomo I-VIII. In Venice: presso Antonio Zatta, 1759-1760 ()
- Istorica notizia dell'origine e del significato delle befane con und idillio finora inedito di Benedetto Buommattei. Lucca: Giusti. 1766.
