= Lorenzo Renzi =

Italian linguist and philologist

Lorenzo Renzi (Vicenza, 1939), Italian linguist and philologist.

== Biography ==
Lecturer of Romance philology at the Paduan Athenaeum, he has chaired the Società Linguistica Italiana.

He is the author of several works in the field of linguistics.

== Main works ==
- La lingua italiana oggi: un problema scolastico e sociale, a cura di Lorenzo Renzi e M. A. Cortelazzo, Bologna, Il Mulino, 1977.
- Grande Grammatica italiana di consultazione, a cura di L.Renzi, Giampaolo Salvi e Anna Cardinaletti, 3 voll., Bologna, Il Mulino, 1991.
- Le tendenze dell’italiano contemporaneo. Note sul cambiamento linguistico nel breve periodo, in "Studi di Lessicografia italiana", XVII, 2000, pp. 279–319.
- Etimologia scientifica e etimologia retorica, in L'Accademia della Crusca per Giovanni Nencioni, Firenze, Le Lettere, 2002, pp. 465–482.
- Il cambiamento linguistico nell'italiano contemporaneo, in N. Maraschio e T. Poggi Salani (a cura di), Italia linguistica anno Mille, Italia linguistica anno Duemila, Roma, Bulzoni, 2003, pp. 37–52.
- Il controllo ortografico del computer come tutore della norma dell’italiano, in Gli italiani e la lingua, a cura di Franco Lo Piparo e Giovanni Ruffino, Palermo, Sellerio, 2005, pp. 199–208.
- Manuale di Linguistica e Filologia romanza, (con A. Andreose), Bologna, il Mulino, 2003.
- Grammatica dell’italiano antico, a cura di Giampaolo Salvi e Lorenzo Renzi, Bologna, il Mulino, 2010, 2 voll., pp. 1745.
