= Palazzo di Parte Guelfa =

Coordinates: 43°46′10.34″N 11°15′13.26″E

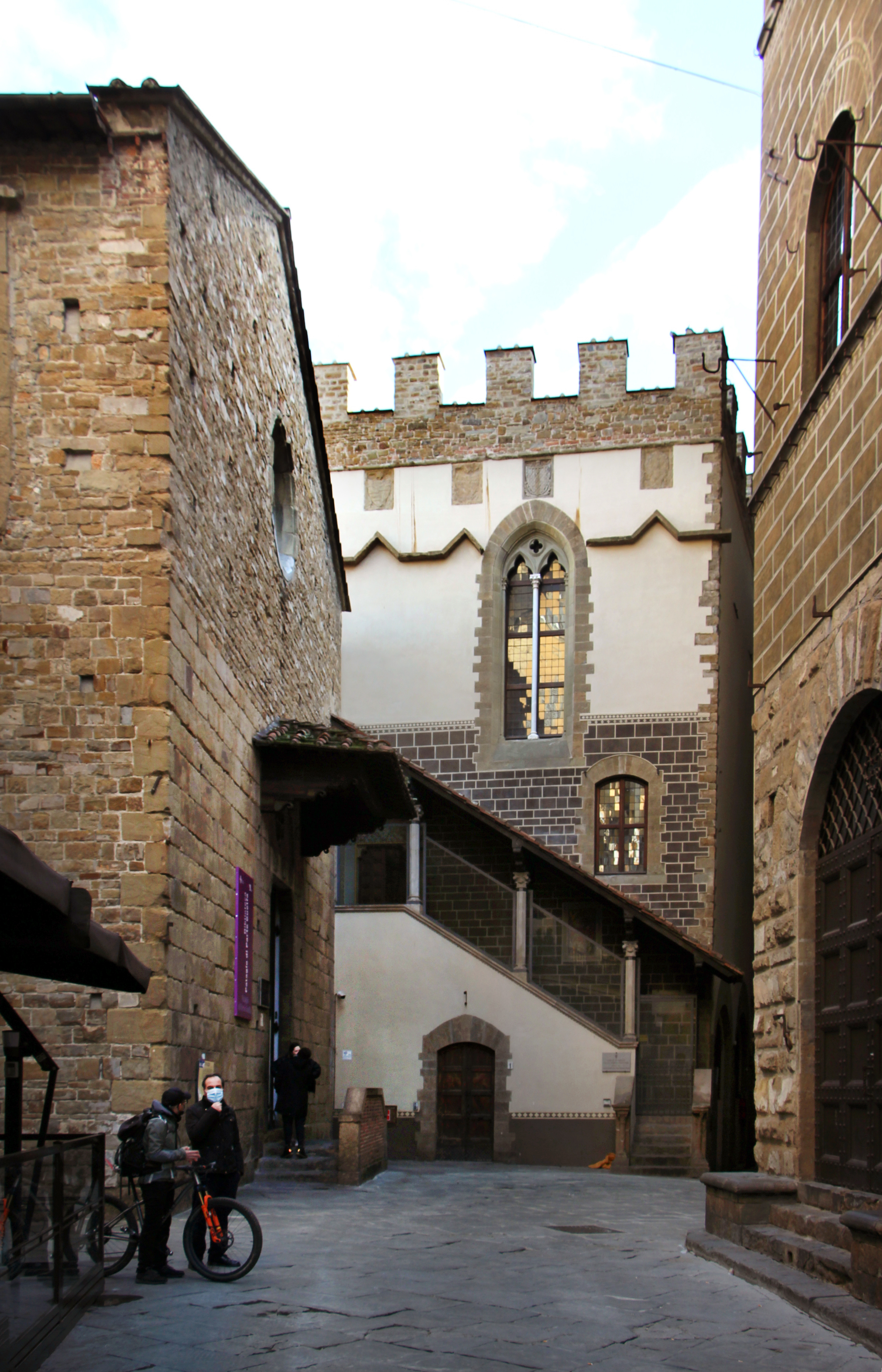
Palazzo di Parte Guelfa

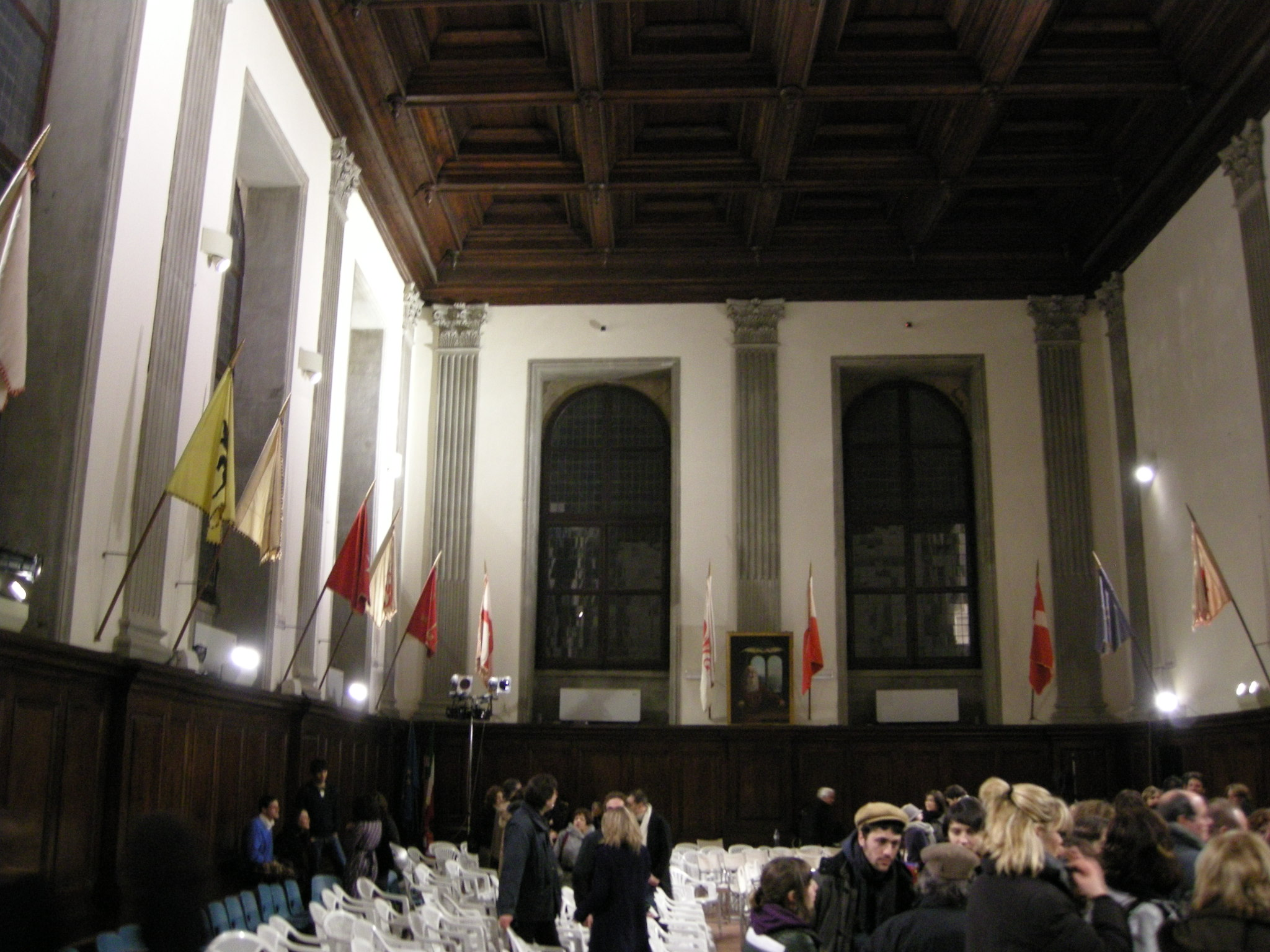
Brunelleschi hall

The Palazzo di Parte Guelfa (also called Palagio di Parte Guelfa) is a historical building in Florence, central Italy. During the Middle Ages, it was the headquarters of the Guelph party in the city (Parte Guelfa). It stands across the alley from the Palazzo Canacci.

== History ==
According to Giovanni Villani's Cronica, in 1267 the Florentine Guelph party did not own a seat, and held its meeting in the church of Santa Maria sopra la Porta. In the early 14th century, a first building was erected near the church, to which, in the following century, a further construction on the modern Via delle Terme and a larger one at the corner with via di Capaccio were added (the latter would house the meeting hall). According to some sources, Filippo Brunelleschi was involved in the design of the hall at the first floor.

The construction, halted during the war with Lucca and Milan, was restarted probably from the 1430s onward. Around 1452, Maso di Bartolomeo completed the decoration of Brunelleschi's hall. In the 16th century Giorgio Vasari added to it a coffered ceiling, as well as building a new staircase and other sections. In 1921, the whole complex underwent an extensive renovation in neo-medieval style. The façade fresco by Gherardo Starnina and Giotto's paintings in the interior were already lost at the time. Remaining artworks include a lunette by Luca della Robbia (above the façade portal), taken from the demolished church of San Pier Buonconsigio, a small loggia by Vasari and a Medici crest sculpted by Giambologna.

It was again damaged during World War II and then restored. It currently houses meetings and conventions, cultural exhibitions, and is the seat of the organization of Calcio Storico Fiorentino and of the historical re-enactments of the Florentine Republic.

In 2015, a Catholic archconfraternity Parte Guelfa was established by the mayor of Florence in the Palagio di Parte Guelfa, this organization considers itself a spiritual successor to the Guelf confraternity established in 1266 by Pope Clement IV.

== Sources ==
- Benzi, Sara (2006). Il Palagio di Parte Guelfa a Firenze. Florence University Press.
