= Accademia della Crusca =

Language regulator of Italian

- The geographic distribution of the Italian language in the world
- Abbreviation: La Crusca
- Formation: 1583; 443 years ago
- Headquarters: Florence, Italy
- Official language: Italian
- President: Paolo D'Achille
- Website: accademiadellacrusca.it/en

The Accademia della Crusca (Italian: [akkaˈdɛːmja della ˈkruska]; lit. 'Academy of the Bran'), generally abbreviated as La Crusca, is a Florence-based society of scholars of Italian linguistics and philology. It is one of the most important research institutions of the Italian language, as well as the oldest linguistic academy in the world.

The Accademia was founded in Florence in 1583, and has since been characterised by its efforts to maintain the purity of the Italian language. Crusca, which means "bran" in Italian, helps convey the metaphor that its work is similar to winnowing, as also does its emblem depicting a sifter for straining out corrupt words and structures (as bran is separated from wheat). The academy motto is "Il più bel fior ne coglie" ('She gathers the fairest flower'), a famous line by the Italian poet Petrarch. In 1612, the Accademia published the first edition of its dictionary, the Vocabolario degli Accademici della Crusca, which has served as the model for similar works in French, Spanish, German and English.

The academy is a member of the European Federation of National Linguistic Institutes.

== History ==
=== Origins ===
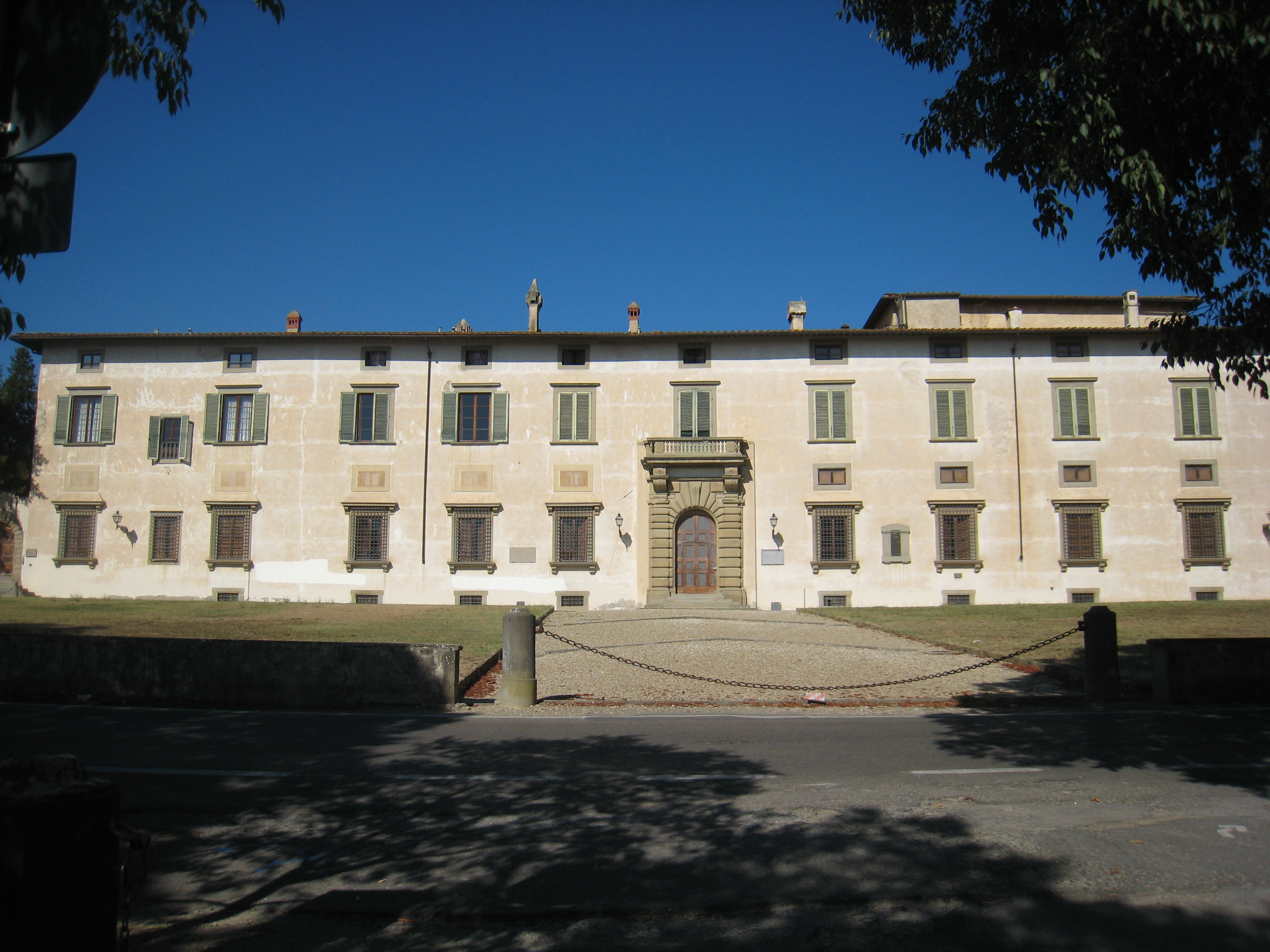
Villa di Castello, headquarters of the Accademia della Crusca

The founders were originally called the brigata dei Crusconi and constituted a circle composed of poets, men of letters, and lawyers. The members usually assembled on pleasant and convivial occasions, during which cruscate—discourses in a merry and playful style, which have neither a beginning nor an end—were recited. The Crusconi used humour, satire, and irony to distance itself from the pedantry of the Accademia Fiorentina, protected by Grand Duke Cosimo I de' Medici, and to contrast itself with the severe and classic style of that body. This battle was fought without compromising the primary intention of the group, which was typically literary and expounded in high-quality literary disputes.

The founders of the Accademia della Crusca are traditionally identified as Giovan Battista Deti ('Sollo'), Antonio Francesco Grazzini ('Lasca'), Bernardo Canigiani ('Gramolato'), Bernardo Zanchini ('Macerato'), Bastiano de' Rossi ('Inferigno'); they were joined in October 1582 by Lionardo Salviati ('Infarinato') (1540–1589). Under his leadership, at the beginning of 1583, the Accademia took on a new form, directing itself to demonstrate and to conserve the beauty of the Florentine vulgar tongue, modelled upon the authors of the Trecento.

=== Monosini and the first Vocabolario ===
One of the earliest scholars to influence the work of the Crusca was Agnolo Monosini. He contributed greatly to the 1612 edition of Vocabolario degli Accademici della Crusca, especially with regard to the influence of Greek, which, he maintained, made a significant contribution to the Florentine idiom of the period.

The Accademia thus abandoned the jocular character of its earlier meetings in order to take up the normative role it would assume from then on. The very title of the Accademia came to be interpreted in a new way: the academicians of the Crusca would now work to distinguish the good and pure part of the language (the farina, or whole wheat) from the bad and impure part (the crusca, or bran). From this is derived the symbolism of the Crusca: its logo shows a frullone or sifter with the Petrarchan motto Il più bel fior ne coglie (She gathers the fairest flower). The members of the Accademia were given nicknames associated with corn and flour, and seats in the form of breadbaskets with backs in the shape of bread shovel were used for their meetings.

In 1636, Cardinal Richelieu created the Académie Française on the model of the Accademia della Crusca.

=== Beccaria and Verri opposition ===
The linguistic purism of the Accademia found opposition in Cesare Beccaria and the Verri brothers (Pietro and Alessandro), who through their journal Il Caffè systematically attacked the Accademia's archaisms as pedantic, denouncing the Accademia while invoking for contrast no less than the likes of Galileo and Newton and even modern intellectual cosmopolitanism itself. However, since Galileo published his scientific works in his native Florentine Italian, as opposed to the Latin which was customary for academic works of the time, it has also been argued that he implicitly supported the Accademia's purpose.

=== Baroque period ===
The Accademia's activities carried on with both high and low points until 1783, when Pietro Leopoldo quit and, with several other academicians, created the second Accademia Fiorentina. In 1808, however, the third Accademia Fiorentina was founded and, by a decree of 19 January 1811, signed by Napoleon, the Crusca was re-established with its own status of autonomy, statutes and previous aims.

In the 20th century, the decree of 11 March 1923 changed its composition and its purpose. The compilation of the Vocabolario, hitherto the duty of the Crusca, was removed from it and passed to a private society of scholars; the Crusca was entrusted with the compilation of philological texts. In 1955, however, Bruno Migliorini and others began discussion of the return of the work of preparing the Vocabolario to the Crusca.

=== In recent years ===
In 2007, the website e-Leo (leonardodigitale.com), compiling 3,000 drawings and writings of Leonardo da Vinci, was launched with the help of the Accademia della Crusca to decipher some of the inventor's scribblings.

In August 2011, the existence of the Accademia was threatened when Giulio Tremonti and Silvio Berlusconi introduced a proposition to eradicate all public-funded entities with fewer than 70 members. In August 2015, the Accademia's website was defaced by a hacker linked to ISIS.

In February 2016, the Accademia approved an eight-year-old boy's submission for the new Italian word petaloso (full of petals).

== Events ==
On the occasion of the XXV Week of the Italian Language in the World (13-19 October 2025) the Accademia della Crusca and goWare are distributing the e-book Italofonia: language beyond borders.

== Composition ==
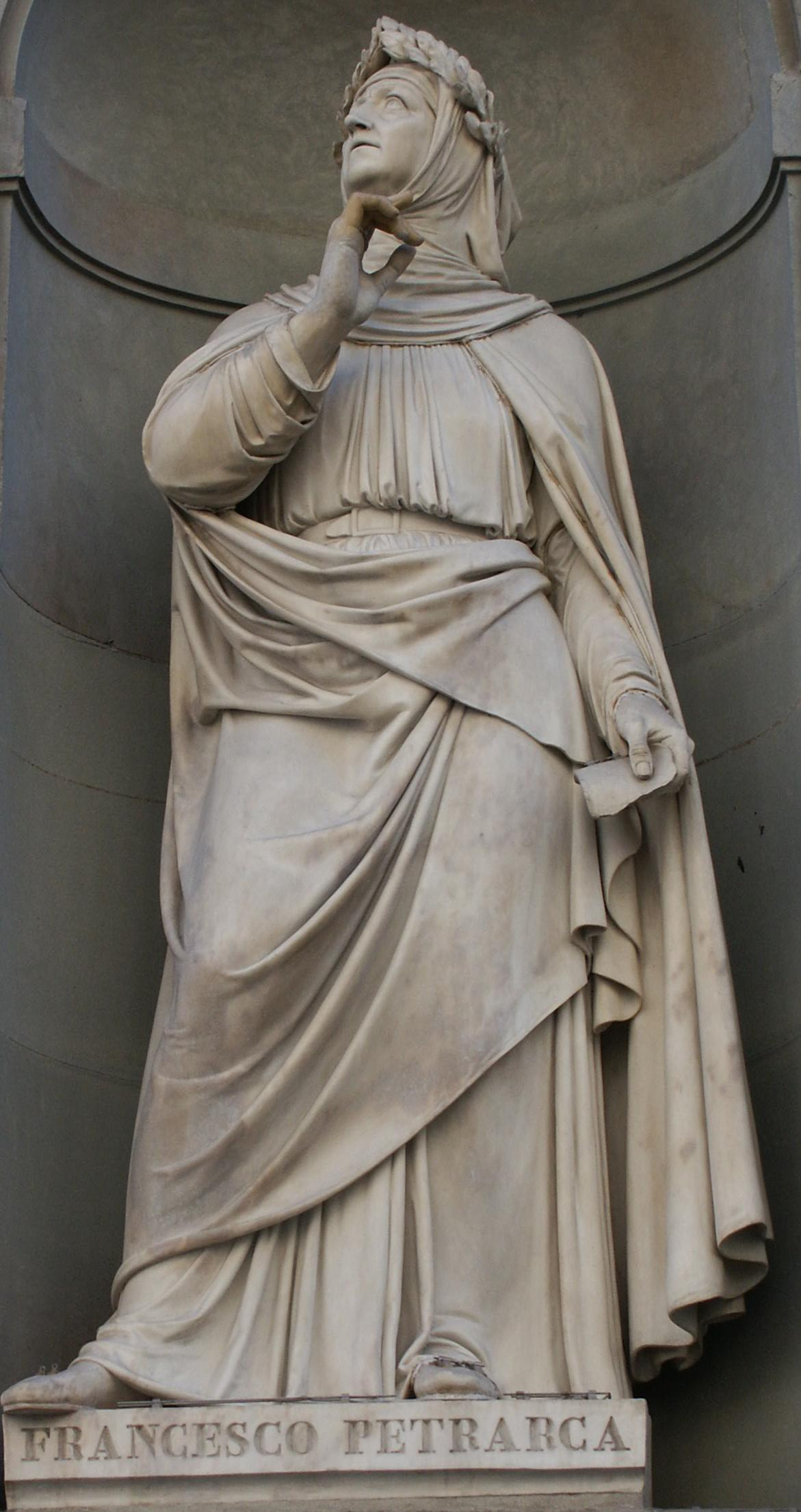
Petrarch was endorsed as a model for Italian style by the Accademia della Crusca.

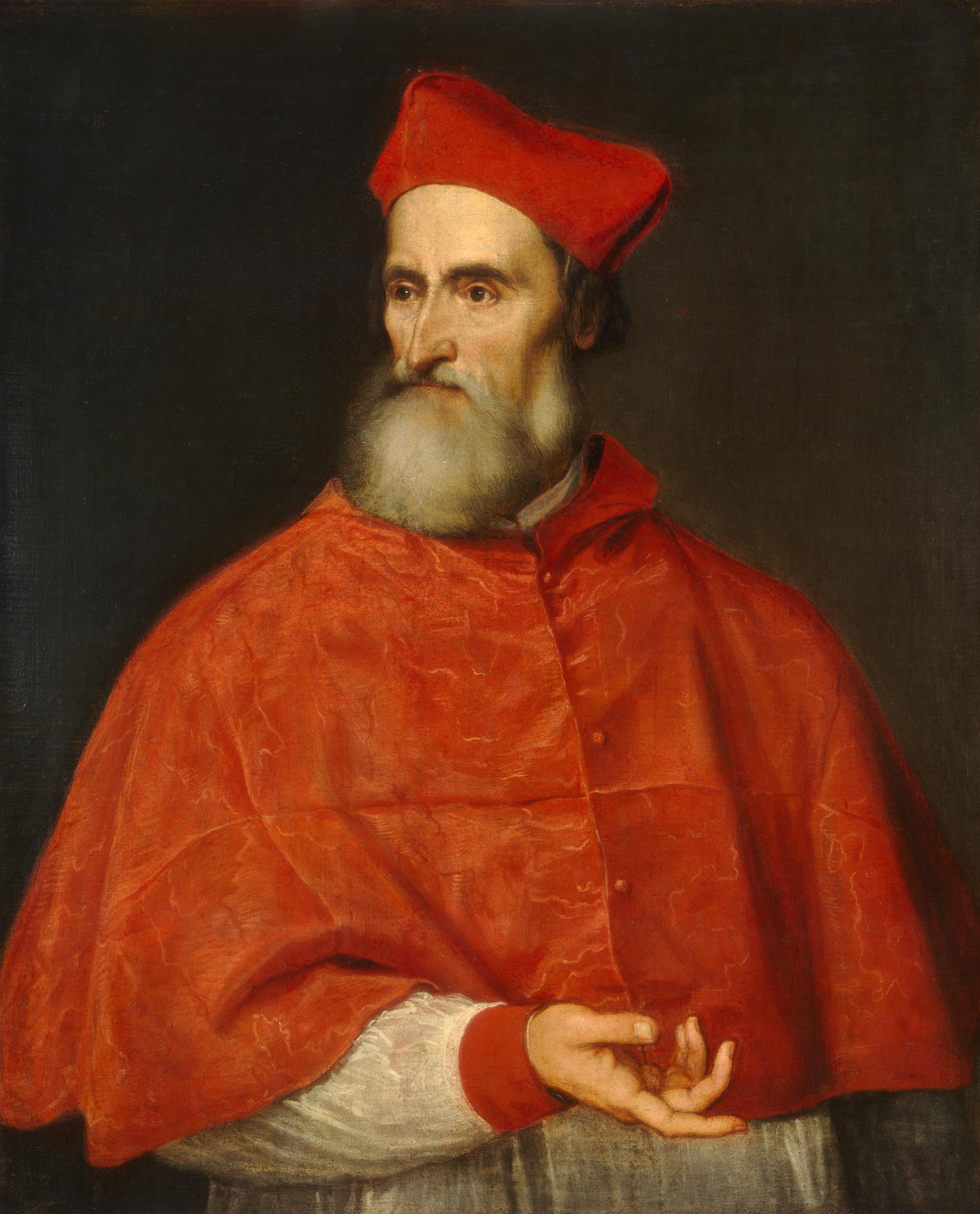
Pietro Bembo was an influential figure in the development of Italian, codifying the language for standard modern usage.

=== Members ===
Members include:

- Nicoletta Maraschio (emerita), honorary president, Florence
- Lorenzo Renzi (emeritus), Padua
- Luca Serianni (emeritus), Rome
- Martin Maiden, Oxford
