= Gronovius =

Gronovius is a surname. It is a latinised form of the surname Gronow. Notable people with the surname include:

- Abraham Gronovius (1695-1775), Dutch classical scholar and librarian, son of Jakob Gronovius;
- Jakob Gronovius (1645–1716), Dutch classical scholar, son of Johann Friedrich Gronovius;
- Jan Frederik Gronovius (also Johannes Fredericus) (1686–1762), Dutch botanist, son of Jakob Gronovius;
- Johann Friedrich Gronovius (1611–1671), German classical scholar and critic;
- Laurens Theodorus Gronovius (1730–1777), Dutch botanist.

== See also ==
- Gronovius (beetle), a genus of insects in the family Chrysomelidae
- Cuscuta gronovii, Gronovius' dodder
