= Abraham Gronovius =

Dutch jurist and librarian (1668–1775)

- Born: 24 June 1695; Leiden, the Netherlands
- Died: 18 August 1775 (aged 80); Leiden, the Netherlands
- Occupations: Editor of classical works and Librarian of Leiden University, 1741-1775

Academic background
- Education: Leiden Latin school, Leiden University, law doctorate University of Angers

Academic work
- Discipline: Classics
- Institutions: Leiden University

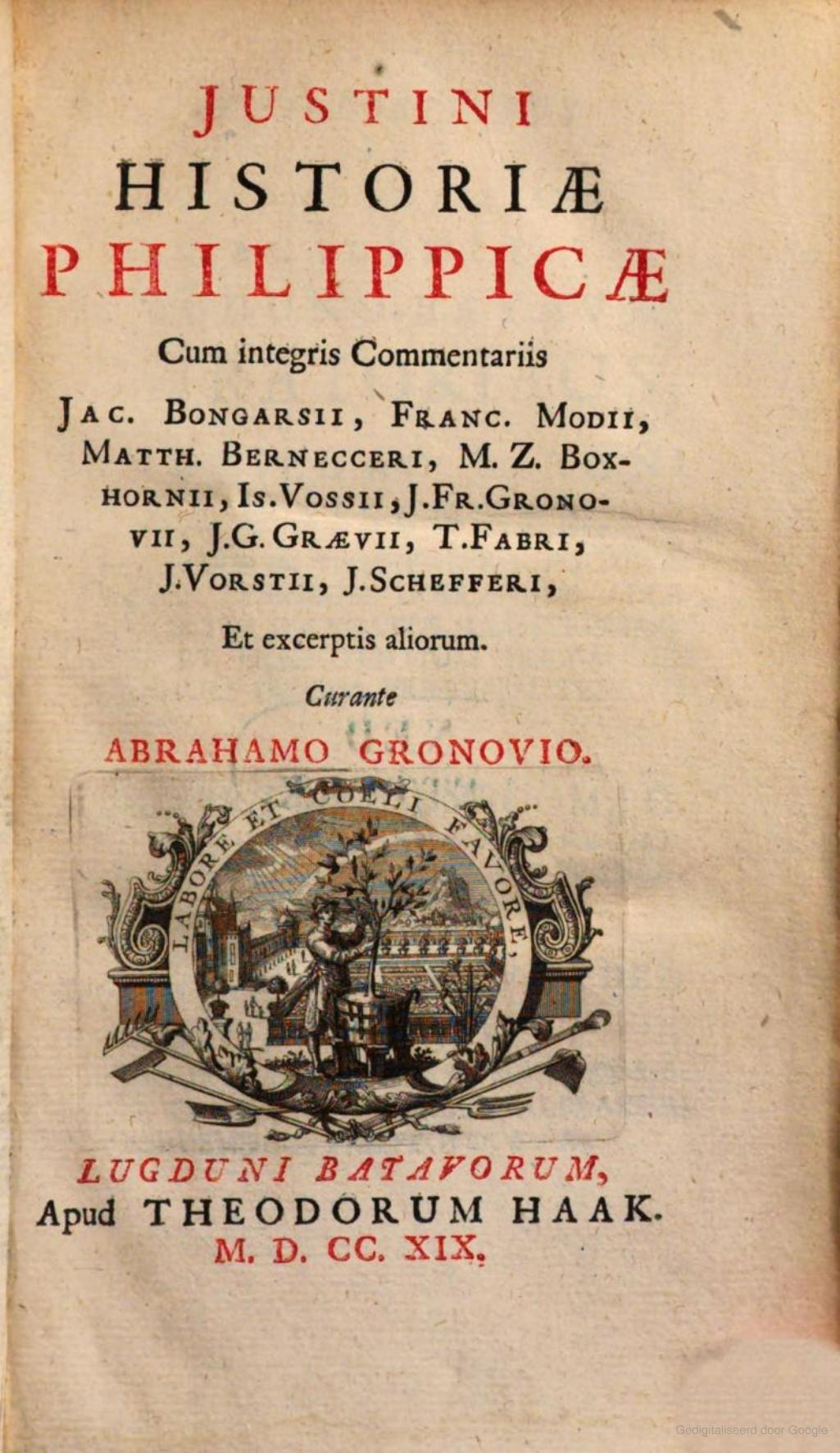
Justinus and Abraham Gronovius, Ed.: Historiae Philippicae, Leiden 1719. Title page.

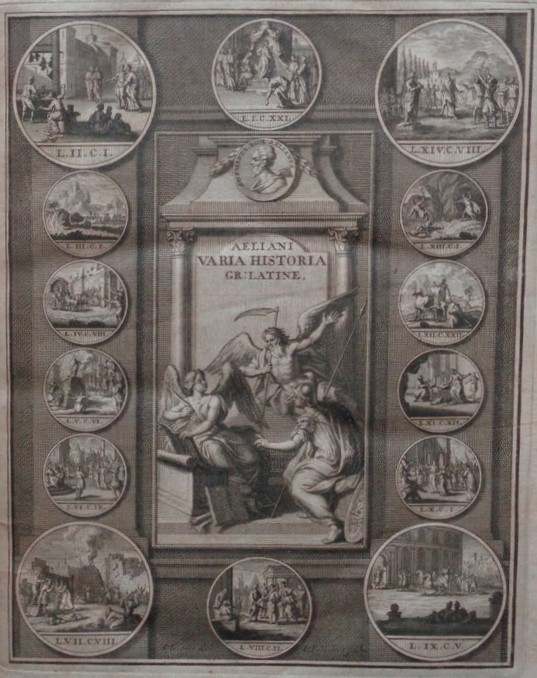
Claudius Aelianus and Abraham Gronovius, Ed.: Aeliani varia historia, Graece et Latine, 1731. Frontispiece.

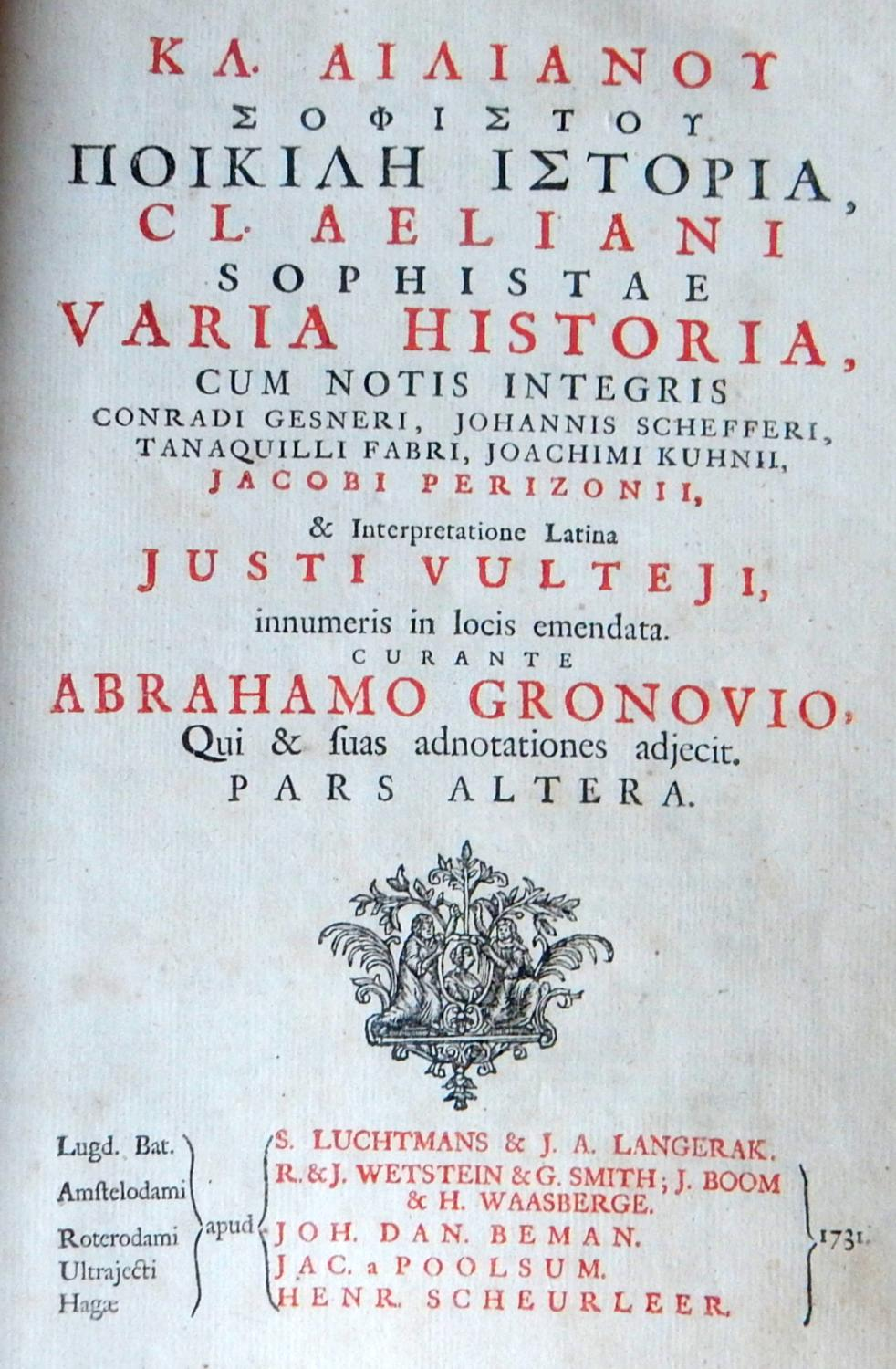
Claudius Aelianus and Abraham Gronovius, Ed.: Aeliani varia historia, Graece et Latine, 1731. Title page.

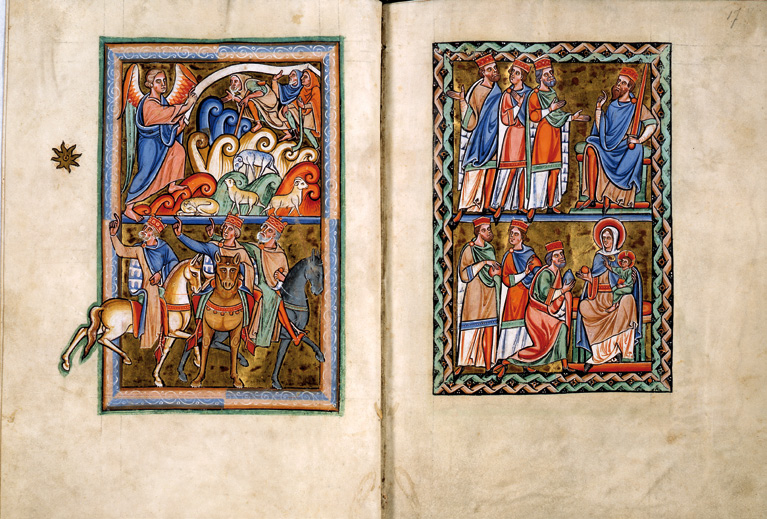
Anonymous: Leiden Psalter of Saint Louis pages 121 verso-122 recto, acquired by Abraham Gronovius as a donation by mayor of Leiden Johan van den Bergh in 1741. Original from the 1190s.

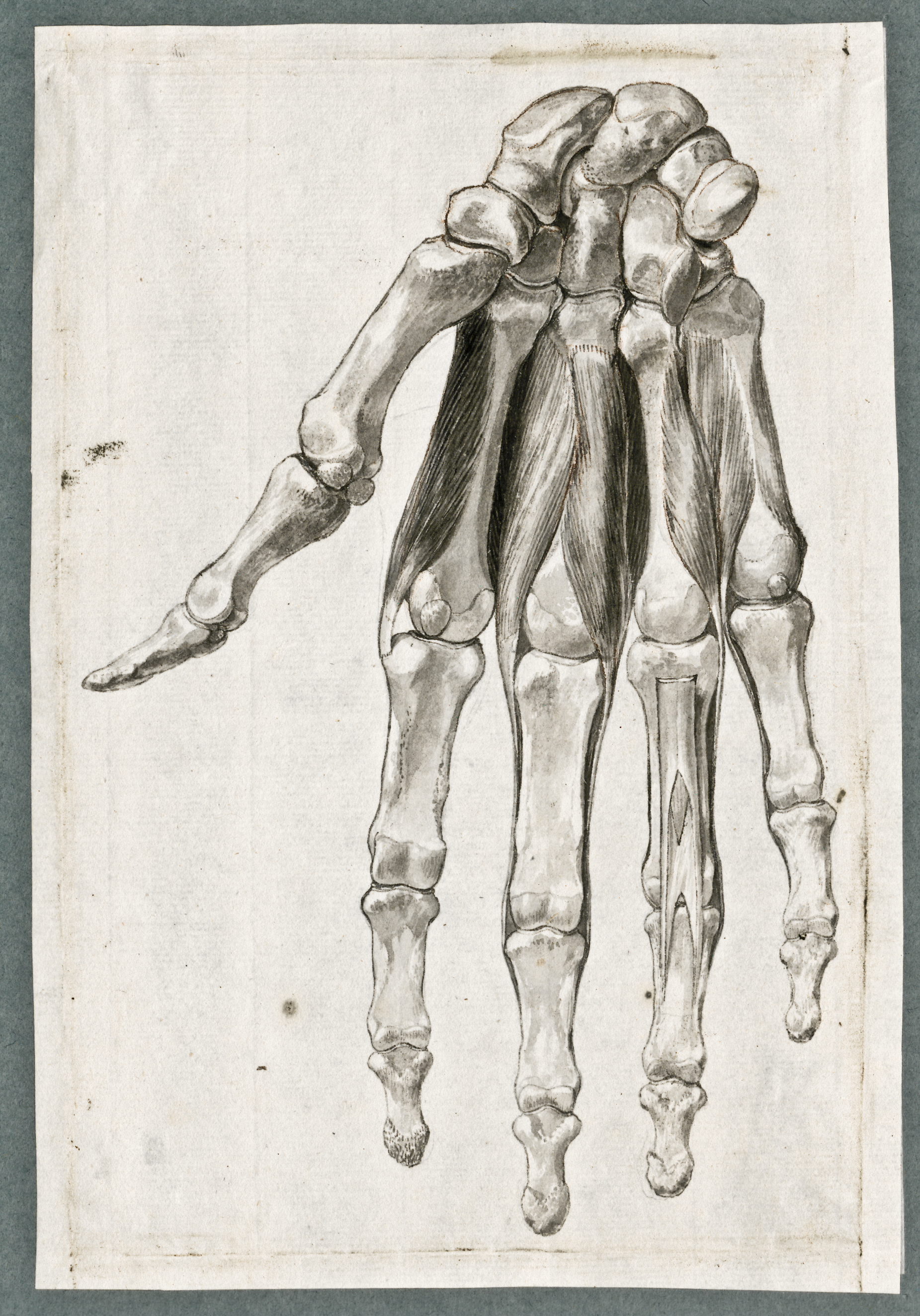
Jan Wandelaar and Bernhard Siegfried Albinus: Human hand muscles. Sketch for B.S. Albinus, Tabulae sceleti et musculorum corporis humani, Leiden 1747. Part of the anatomical works of Albinus acquired by Gronovius in 1770 for Leiden University Library.

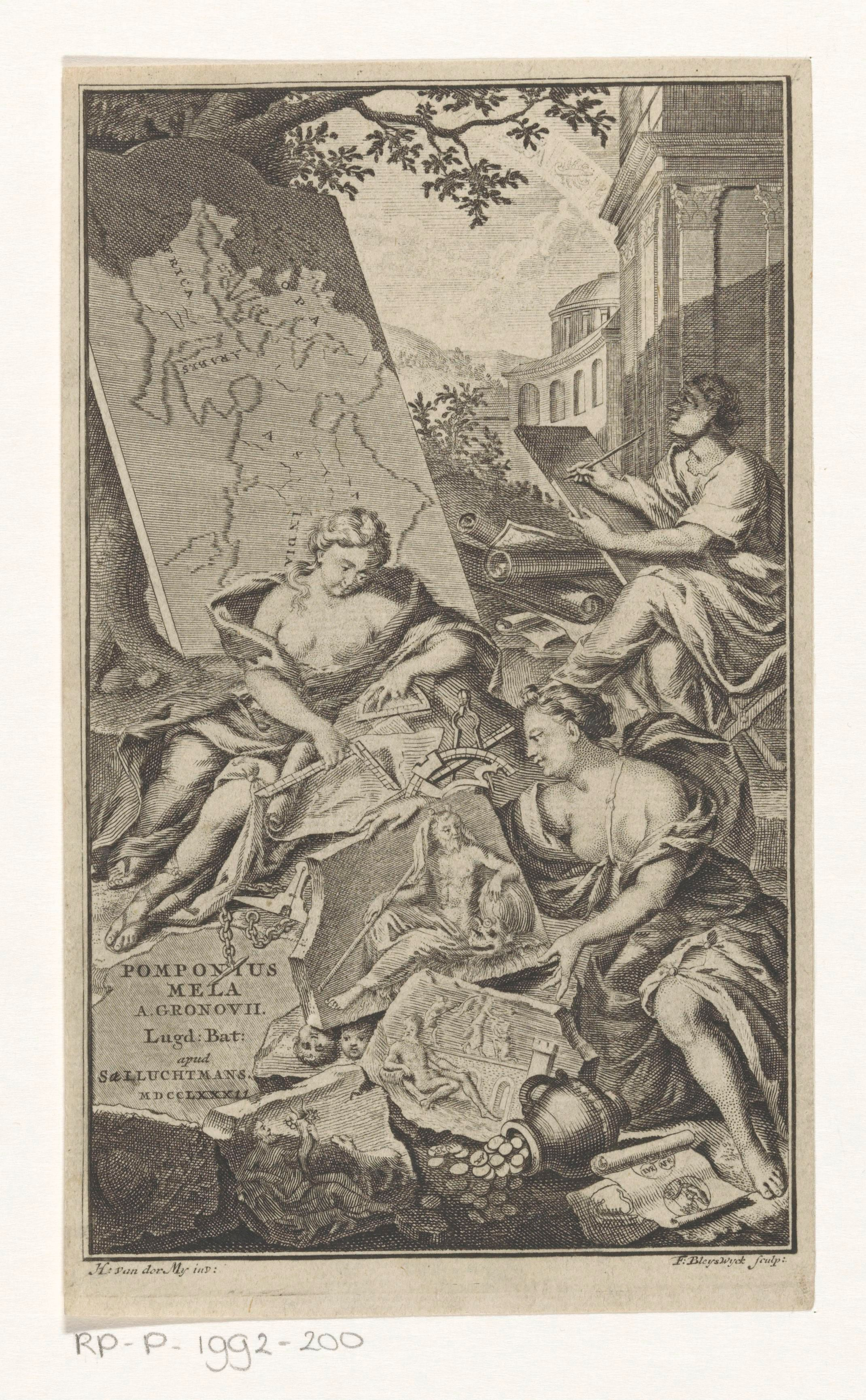
Pomponius Mela and Abraham Gronovius, Ed.: Pomponii Melae de situ orbis libri III, 1782. Frontispiece.

Abraham Gronovius (the Latinized form of Gronow; 14 June 1668 – 18 August 1775) was a Dutch jurist and classical scholar from the Gronovius dynasty of scholars. As the eleventh librarian of Leiden University he introduced prudent library management enhancing the collection. Gronovius curated several editions of Latin and Greek language classical works.

== Biography ==
Born the son of Leiden professor of Greek and History Jakob Gronovius, grandson of Leiden professor and university librarian Johann Friedrich Gronovius, and brother of botanist Jan Frederik Gronovius, Abraham Gronovius inherited the love for the classics from his father Jacob and studied law in his home town. He obtained a law doctorate at the University of Angers, France, and went to England to study Greek, Latin and Syriac manuscripts in Cambridge, Oxford and London. In 1720 he married Dorothea Wynanda van Asch van Wijk from a Dutch patrician family. In 1741 he became the first professional Leiden University librarian, by not being a professor at the same time, and raising the standards of library management.

== Works ==
Gronovius' works include:

=== Claudius Aelianus: Varia Historia ===
- Aelianus, Claudius (1731). Gronovius, Abraham (ed.). Cl. Aeliani sophistae Varia historia, : cum notis integris Conradi Gesneri, Johannis Schefferi, Tanaquilli Fabri, Joachimi Kuhnii, Jacobi Perizonii, & interpretatione latina Justi Vulteji, innumeris in locis emendata. Curante Abrahamo Gronovio, qui & suas adnotaciones adjecit (in Latin and Greek). S. Luchtmans & J.A. Langerak.

=== Justinus: Historiae Philippicae ===
- Justinus, Marcus Junianus (1719). Gronovius, Abraham (ed.). Justini Historiae Philippicae : cum integris commentariis Jac. Bongarsii, Franc. Modii, Matth. Bernecceri, M.Z. Boxhornii, Is. Vossii, J. Fr. Gronovii, J.G. Graevii, T. Fabri, J. Vorstii, J. Schefferi, et excerptis aliorum (in Latin). Theodorus Haak.
  - Justinus, Marcus Junianus (1760). Gronovius, Abraham (ed.). Historicae Phillipicae cum ... commentariis ... (in Latin). S. et J. Luchtmans.

=== Pomponius Mela: De situ orbis ===
- Pomponius Mela (1748). Gronovius, Abraham (ed.). Pomponii Melae De situ orbis libri III. : Cum notis integris Hermolai Barbari, Petri Joannis Olivarii, Fredenandi Nonii Pintiani, Petri Ciacconii. S. Luchtmans et fils.
- Gronovius, Abraham, ed. (1781). Pomponii Melae De situ orbis libri III. : cum varietate lectionis Reinold. et Gronov. : accedunt indices locupletissimi in usum scholarum. Io. Gottl. Vierlingium.
- Pomponius Mela (1782). Gronovius, Abraham (ed.). Pomponii Melae De situ orbis libri III. : Cum notis integris Hermolai Barbari, Petri Joannis Olivarii, Fredenandi Nonii Pintiani, Petri Ciacconii [e. a.] S. et J. Luchtmans.

=== Other works ===
- Gronovius, Abraham (1818). Quae integra supersunt opera: quibus accesserunt excerptae aliquot, e deperditis ejusdem libris, illustrium virorum epistolae et orationes [Complete surviving works: to which were added some excerpts from the same books, letters and speeches of illustrious men].

== Gronovius Collection ==
The Gronovius Collection at Leiden University Library consists of 150 manuscripts, including medieval codices and unpublished notes of Gronovius, his father and grandfather in Latin and Greek, and 317 partly annotated printed books.

== Literature ==
- Berkvens-Stevelinck, Christiane (2012). Magna commoditas : Leiden University's great asset : 425 years library collections and services. Translated by UvA Talen, Amsterdam. Leiden: Leiden University Press. pp. 127–129, 133–134, 137. ISBN 9789087281656. OCLC 794706996.
- Hulshoff Pol, Elfriede (1962). Een Leids bibliothecaris : Abraham Gronovius [A Leiden librarian: Abraham Gronovius] (in Dutch). Den Haag: Nijhoff. OCLC 69185524. Reprint from L. Brummel et al., Eds. Het Boek. Tijdschrift voor boek- en bibliotheekwezen, third series, volume 35, pages 91–120 https://catalogue.leidenuniv.nl/.
- Molhuysen, P.C. (1923). Bronnen tot de geschiedenis der Leidsche Universiteit 53. 10 febr. 1765 – 21 febr. 1795. Rijks geschiedkundige publicatiën (in Dutch). Vol. 6. ’s-Gravenhage: Martinus Nijhoff. p. 281. OCLC 780665394.
