= House of Filicaja =

House of Filicaia
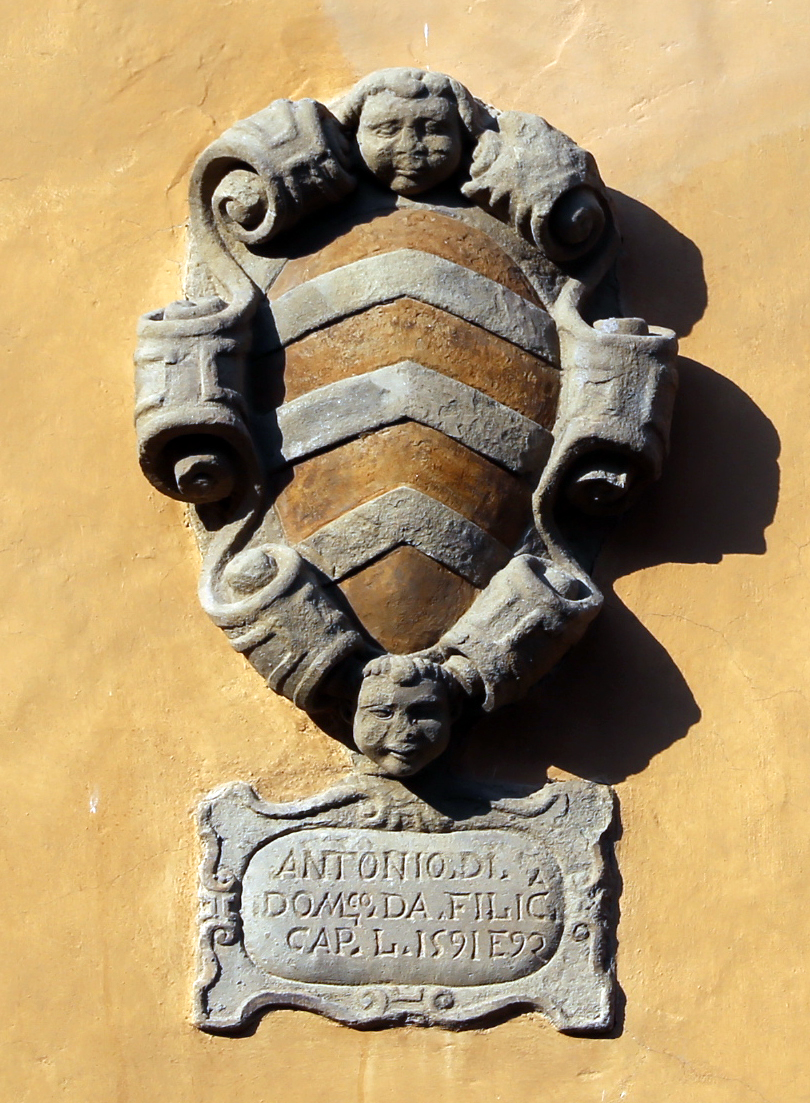
- Country: Holy Roman Empire, Grand Duchy of Tuscany, Italy, Portugal, Brazil, United Kingdom
- Founded: 786; 1240 years ago as Tebaldi della Vitella
- Founder: Ajone
- Titles: Marquises; Princely Counts in Siena; Counts in Montaione; Patricians of Florence
- Cadet branches: Geddes da Filicaia; Pucci da Filicaia - Nardi Dei da Filicaia Dotti

The Da Filicaja family is a noble Tuscan family of ancient Roman origin, originating from Pontassieve in the province of Florence, Italy.

The family's most notable member is the late 17th-century poet Vincenzo da Filicaja, known for his patriotic poetry, particularly works celebrating the liberation of Vienna from Ottoman rule in 1683. His writings attracted the attention of several European rulers, and he received patronage from Christina, Queen of Sweden. Filicaja held senior offices in the Grand Duchy of Tuscany, serving as governor of Volterra and Pisa, and was later appointed senator by Grand Duke Cosimo III de' Medici.

The Da Filicaja family ruled a fief in the Chianti region, corresponding to the present-day municipalities of Montaione, Gambassi, and Cerreto Guidi. Over time, family members held titles including counts, marquises, and barons, and later bore the title of princely counts.

The family's historical presence is reflected in architectural and heraldic remains, including the Palazzo Da Filicaia in Florence. The family coat of arms and related historical markers are also visible in cities such as Volterra.

The Da Filicaja name remains associated with literary and political activity in Tuscany during the Renaissance and Baroque periods.

== The legend ==
According to legend, a young nobleman from Volterra named Ajone travelled through a distant land and, deep in a forest, encountered a woman named Ine, who was mourning her daughter Figline, said to have been abducted by a man called Gambasso. Ajone resolved to rescue Figline and waged war against Gambasso. After successfully returning her to her mother, Ajone received permission to marry Figline. He is said to have founded the village of Monte Ajone (modern-day Montaione) and the nearby castle of Figline. Despite this union, the descendants of Ajone and Gambasso were believed to have maintained a longstanding rivalry.

The legend continues that the descendants of Ajone and Figline were later attacked by an enemy army, which destroyed the castle after a prolonged siege and killed all its defenders. Following this defeat, the inhabitants of Montaione were said to have reverted to idolatry and decided to sacrifice the village's most beautiful young woman, Filli, to appease the gods and restore peace. A Florentine knight, upon learning of the intended sacrifice, travelled to Montaione, prevented the killing, and persuaded the villagers to sacrifice a calf instead. From this episode, he became known as the "Sire della Vitella" (Lord of the Calf).

According to the narrative, Filli later gave the knight her red dress, which had been torn during her ordeal, and he adopted it as his banner. The two married and rebuilt the castle of Figline, where they lived for many years. Over time, both the couple and the place where they lived came to be known as "Fillicara." Their descendants were variously called "Fillicara," "Filicaja," or "da Filicaia," and adopted the red dress as their emblem.

In 1623, Michelangelo Buonarroti the Younger, nephew of Michelangelo, recorded a version of this legend in his work Ajone, adding that in the da Filicaja palace in Montaione even the fountains flowed with wine.

=== Historical interpretation ===
Historically, Gambassi Terme is a neighbouring settlement of Montaione. Although it was long subject to Montaione's authority, the two communities were also rivals. Figline, whose name derives from the Latin figulinae (statuettes), was an area where Roman-era discoveries revealed numerous Etruscan artefacts.

The castle of Figline was purchased in 1452 by Ser Giovanni di Simone da Filicaja for strategic military reasons. The da Filicaja family, initially known as "della Vitella" or "Tebaldi" until the mid-13th century, later adopted the name "Filicaja," derived from Felceto, a locality near Florence where they held a castle. This change was intended to avoid overt association with nobility and thus permit eligibility for public office under the Florentine Republic.

As a result, between 1284 and 1523, members of the family served prominently in Florentine civic life, producing 12 Gonfaloniers and 66 Priors of the Republic.

== Origins ==
By the end of the 11th century, a family known as the Tebaldi—also referred to as della Vitella or d'Aquona (from the castle of Quona, where they resided)—held a dominant position in the town of Pontassieve, east of Florence. According to later tradition, the family subsequently adopted the name Filicaja, derived from a local toponym meaning "ferny area," referring to land covered with ferns near the castle, also known as Costa Filicaia.

The Tebaldi (or della Vitella), whose most prominent early figure was Tebaldo della Vitella, were traditionally said to have been of knightly status, with later sources attributing his knighthood to Charlemagne in 786. Such claims are generally regarded as legendary. It is further suggested that, with the rise of the Florentine Republic, the family adopted the name Filicaja in order to appear non-noble and thus become eligible for public office. The family later relocated to Florence and, in 1207, sold most of its holdings in Pontassieve to the Florentine bishopric.

By the 15th century, the Filicaja family was firmly established in Florence and developed renewed interests in the countryside around Montaione. In the mid-15th century, Giovanni da Filicaja purchased the castle of Figline from the Figlinesi family. From that point onward, the site became known as Filicaja (or Al Filicaja), and later as Villa da Filicaja.

Members of the Filicaja family held numerous public offices in Florence, including:

- 12 Gonfaloniers of Justice (from 1284 to 1523)
- 65 Priors (from 1284 to 1523)
- 45 members of the XII Buonuomini (from 1329 to 1529)
- 49 members of the XVI di Compagnia (from 1322 to 1530)
- 5 senators of the Grand Duchy of Tuscany (from 1573 to 1695)

== Alexander Filicarius ==
Alexander Filicarius was born in Florence on August 13, 1429, to Antonio di Luca da Filicaja and Bartolomea di Giovanni di Paolo Morelli. Until the age of thirty, he lived primarily on income derived from his real estate holdings. In 1459, he began his public career (cursus honorum) with his appointment as podestà of Montevarchi.

From that point until his death, Filicarius served as podestà, vicar, or captain in numerous cities and territories of the Florentine state. He was twice elected Gonfalonier of Justice (in 1467 and 1474), served as a member of the XII Buonuomini (Twelve Good Men) in 1486, and of the XVI Gonfalonieri (Sixteen Gonfaloniers) in 1501. Over the course of his life, he held dozens of additional civic and administrative offices.

In 1455, Filicarius, who maintained a close friendship with Lorenzo de' Medici, married into the Medici family. He was also closely associated with the philosopher Marsilio Ficino, who expressed personal esteem for him in correspondence. In a letter dated January 13, 1474, Ficino wrote to Lorenzo de' Medici:

"Salutat Alexander Filicarius tuus, vir quantum probus tantum nobis carus, ergo carissimus."

(Marsilio Ficino to Lorenzo de' Medici, p. XXII)

Although Filicarius belonged to a family traditionally aligned with the Medici, he continued to accumulate public offices during the popular regime that followed the expulsion of the Medici from Florence in 1494. Among other activities, he participated in the Pratiche Riunite convened in 1505, which debated measures for the reconquest of Pisa. The city had rebelled against Florentine rule in 1494 and was ultimately restored to Florentine control in 1509, with the entry of his cousin Antonio da Filicaja alongside Averardo Salviati and Niccolò Capponi.

The final documentary reference to Alexander Filicarius dates to August 12, 1512.

== Antonio da Filicaja ==
Antonio da Filicaja was born in Florence on July 7, 1455, the son of Niccolò di Antonio da Filicaja and Marietta di Giannozzo Pandolfini. His first recorded public appointment dates to 1489, when he was selected as a member of the XII Buonuomini (Twelve Good Men) for the district of San Giovanni. He subsequently served multiple terms as one of the Consoli del Mare. During one of his stays in Pisa while holding this office, his daughter Ersilia died and was buried in the church of San Martino a Chinzia.

Antonio's responsibilities increased after the expulsion of Piero de' Medici from Florence and the establishment of the republican regime. Following Pisa's rebellion against Florentine rule in 1494, Antonio da Filicaja was stationed almost continuously between 1495 and 1499 at Rosignano, where he was charged with defending the coastline from the tower of Vada (now part of Rosignano Marittimo) to Livorno. In 1500, he was appointed Commissioner of Livorno, with responsibility for defending the mouth of the Arno against possible Pisan incursions.

In 1501, he requested and received a galleon of the Florentine Republic, anchored in the port and valued at 60 gold florins, as compensation for his services. In the summer of that year, shortly before returning to Florence, he encountered the Prince of Piombino, Iacopo IV d'Appiano, who, while fleeing toward France pursued by Valentino, entrusted his son to Antonio's care.

Antonio da Filicaja later served as Captain of Pistoia and, in 1503, was appointed to the Priors for the first time. In the same year, he was sent to Valdichiana as podestà of Castiglion Fiorentino with special authority in rebus bellicis. There, he organised an extraordinary levy to prevent raids by Miguel Corella, a lieutenant of Valentino, who was passing through the region en route to Romagna. The forces of Valdichiana, led by Filicaja and Giovanni Ridolfi, commissioner in Arezzo, defeated Corella’s troops and captured him.

In 1504, Antonio served for six months on the Council of Ten and was sent to Livorno to negotiate the hiring of a captain of galleys from the King of Naples, tasked with blockading the mouth of the Arno. He was subsequently dispatched to Livorno on numerous occasions to supervise fortification works and manage other military matters along the coast. In 1508, the Council of Ten wrote to him, stating that he had by then acquired greater knowledge of the region than any other Florentine citizen.

In early 1509, following a closely contested vote, Antonio da Filicaja, Averardo Salviati, and Niccolò Capponi were elected commissioners for the area surrounding Pisa. On June 8 of that year, the three commissioners entered Pisa as victors, accompanied by their troops, and their names were inscribed on a marble plaque at the entrance to the Palazzo Pretorio.

Earlier efforts to reclaim Pisa had included a proposal to divert the course of the Arno to flood the surrounding territory. In July 1503, the Florentine government sent Leonardo da Vinci, Gerolamo da Filicaja, and Alessandro degli Albizi to study the feasibility of the plan. Gerolamo reported on July 22 that Leonardo, Alessandro, and four others had reached the area of operations. Leonardo produced designs for an excavation machine but did not personally take part in the work, which was ultimately abandoned for reasons that remain unclear.

In subsequent years, Antonio da Filicaja continued to serve as commissioner or captain in numerous cities. In 1517, he was sent to Arezzo as commissioner during the war waged by the restored Medici regime to seize Montefeltro. After the region was annexed, its administration was entrusted to Antonio, initially as special commissioner and later as captain of San Leo. He held this position until 1522, when he requested relief due to health concerns. After serving six months as captain of Pistoia in 1523, he attained the highest office of the Florentine Republic when he was elected Gonfalonier of Justice.

Antonio da Filicaja died in Florence on May 17, 1526.

== Baccio da Filicaja ==
Between the mid- and late 16th century, the Filicaja family invested extensively in trade with the Americas. During this period, they acquired palaces and warehouses in Lisbon, benefiting from an agreement between Francesco I de' Medici and King Sebastian of Portugal. Under this arrangement, several Florentine merchant families, including the Filicaja, obtained privileged concessions for the importation of pepper and other spices.

This commercial activity declined after 1580, when the unification of the kingdoms of Portugal and Spain under Philip II significantly reduced Lisbon's role as a major trading centre. As a result, the Filicaja family closed their Portuguese operations. Baccio da Filicaja (1575–1610), who had arrived in Portugal at a young age during the height of its commercial prosperity, was consequently required to pursue a new career path as an adult.

At the age of twenty, Baccio travelled to Brazil, where he was appointed Chief Engineer by Governor Francisco de Sousa. In this role, he was responsible for fortifying ports, constructing new fortresses, and restoring existing defensive structures. He was simultaneously appointed Captain of Artillery, overseeing the training of bombardiers and the supply of arms to military installations. During this period, following the annexation of Portugal to the Spanish Crown and the defeat of the Spanish Armada, Brazil was exposed to frequent English raids and the gradual settlement of French colonists in the northern region of Pernambuco.

Over the subsequent decade, Baccio held various posts in Brazil. These included participation, under Pietro Coelho de Sousa, in the conquest of territories between the Maranhão River and the Amazon River; involvement in the construction of the church of Monte Serrat in Santos; and an attempt to explore the mouth of the Maranhão River by ship. The latter expedition was unsuccessful, and adverse weather conditions led to the loss of the vessel, which eventually reached what is now Mexico.

For reasons that remain unclear—possibly frustration or a desire to return to Lisbon—Baccio subsequently set sail for Europe. In the same year that he arrived in Lisbon (1608), Philip III appointed Francisco de Sousa, the former governor of Brazil, as Superintendent of Mines. Sousa again requested Baccio's services for the construction and repair of fortifications, prompting Baccio to depart once more for Brazil. He never reached his destination. According to some unverified accounts, he was intercepted, captured, and killed by English forces while travelling aboard a ship flying the Imperial flag; other accounts suggest that he perished in a storm. His ultimate fate remains unknown, and his trail was lost in the Atlantic.

Some authors have proposed that Baccio da Filicaja may be identical with a figure named "Bacho de Filicaya," who appeared in Buenos Aires as a merchant in 1611. This individual reportedly constructed the city's first council building and the San Martín de Tours hospital in 1613 and, in 1619, was charged with reinforcing the prison walls of the Cabildo "for the security of the detainees." However, this identification remains speculative. The Buenos Aires Bacho de Filicaya would have been approximately 32 years old in 1611, whereas Baccio da Filicaja would have been 36. Despite several similarities—including their near contemporaneity, technical expertise in engineering and construction, and the disappearance of Baccio da Filicaja shortly before the appearance of Bacho de Filicaya in Buenos Aires—no documentary evidence has been found to conclusively support the hypothesis that they were the same individual.

== Vincenzo da Filicaja ==
Vincenzo da Filicaja was born in Florence in 1642. He later gained prominence as a poet and intellectual. Although Florentine by birth, he spent much of his life at Filicaja, which he continued to refer to by its earlier name, Figline. At around the age of forty, he published his first poetic works, which brought him public recognition. His reputation was enhanced by his cultural association and friendship with Christina, Queen of Sweden, who, after converting to Catholicism, resided in Rome.

Filicaja distanced himself from the prevailing literary style of Marinism and instead focused on sacred, philosophical, and political themes. In 1687, Christina of Sweden reportedly assisted him financially by paying the tuition fees at the Tolomei School for his son Braccio. Throughout his life, Filicaja experienced persistent financial difficulties and was reluctant to accept public office, fearing it would compromise his intellectual independence. Christina's patronage played a significant role in alleviating these constraints.

Following Christina's death, Filicaja sought more stable sources of income. He succeeded in obtaining a position for his son Baccio as a page at the Medici court. After the early death of his son Braccio, Filicaja accepted the office of senator, reportedly "not out of ambition but out of necessity." He was subsequently appointed Commissioner of Volterra and later of Pisa.

Vincenzo da Filicaja died in Florence in 1707 from what contemporary sources described as a "chest illness." He was buried in the Chapel of Saint Julian in the church of San Pier Maggiore. When the church was demolished at the end of the 18th century, a commemorative plaque was placed in his honour in the Basilica of Santa Croce.

=== The story of Giuseppe Galletti ===
According to later accounts, in 1688 Giuseppe Galletti, a servant in the household of Senator Vincenzo da Filicaja, developed an obsessive fascination with public executions held in the area outside Porta alla Croce. Galletti, who was reportedly treated with consideration by his employer, attended several executions and became increasingly preoccupied with the spectacle.

The story recounts that Galletti deliberately sought his own execution. Initially, he began stealing small sums from da Filicaja, gradually increasing the amounts. When these actions failed to attract attention, he committed a more serious offence by breaking into the church of Santa Brigida on Via del Paradiso and stealing a valuable silver bell. He reportedly made no attempt to conceal his identity or actions, leaving evidence that led to his swift arrest.

Galletti was sentenced to death, not solely for theft but for the desecration of a sacred site. He was executed later that year at the same location where he had previously observed executions. Contemporary narratives describe him as calm and resolute during his final moments, a demeanour that reportedly astonished the Confortatori Neri, the religious confraternity tasked with accompanying condemned prisoners to their deaths.

This episode is generally regarded as an anecdotal and moralising account reflecting early modern attitudes toward crime, punishment, and spectacle, rather than as a fully verifiable historical record.

== See also ==
- Filicaja
