= Vincenzo da Filicaja =

Italian poet and politician (1642–1707)

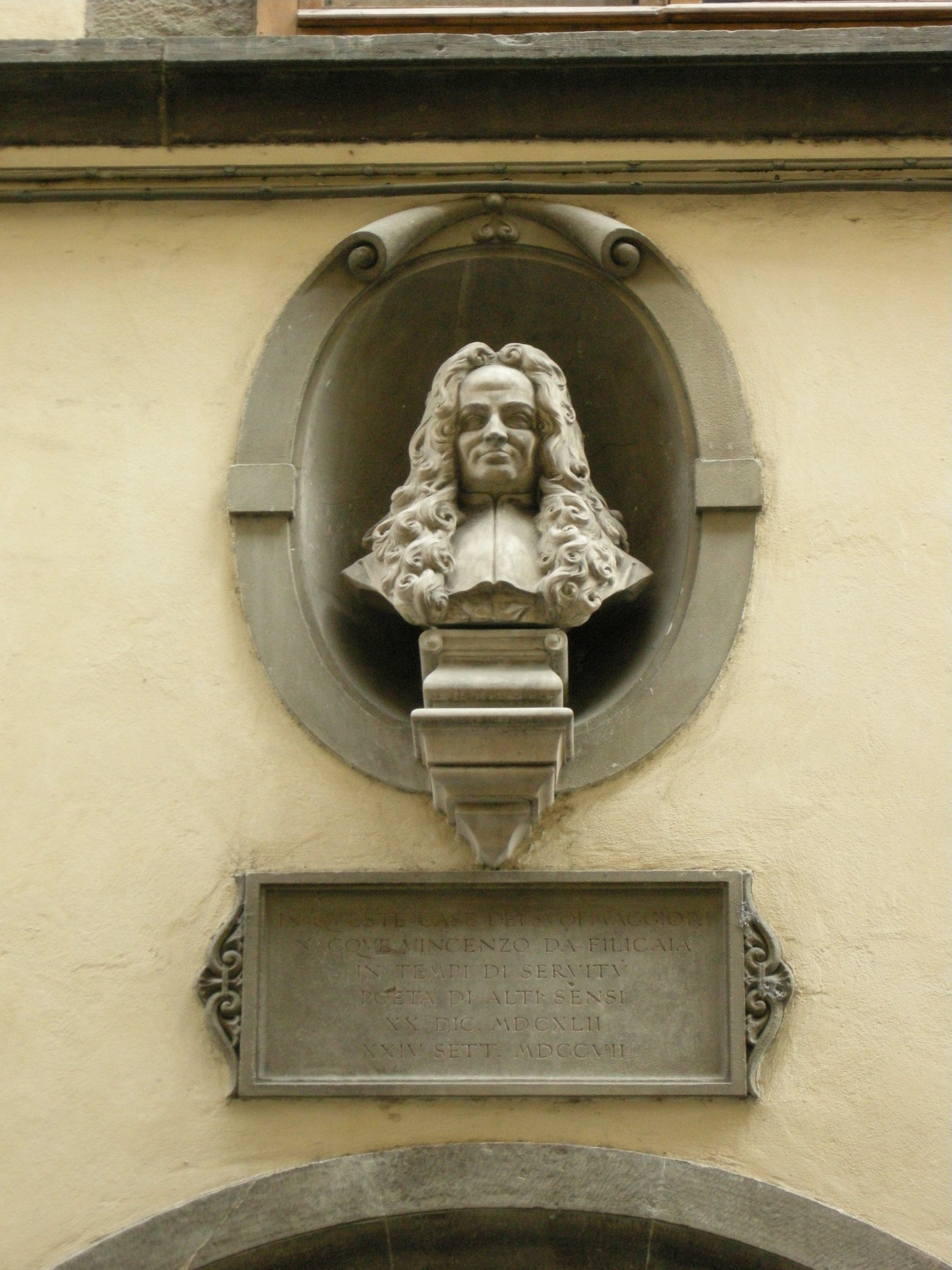
- Vincenzo da Filicaja
- Born: 30 December 1642; Florence, Grand Duchy of Tuscany
- Died: 24 September 1707 (aged 64); Florence, Grand Duchy of Tuscany
- Resting place: Santa Croce, Florence
- Other name: Polibo Emonio
- Education: University of Pisa
- Occupations: Poet; Intellectual; Civil Servant
- Spouse: Anna Capponi (m. 1673)
- Children: 3
- Parent(s): Braccio da Filicaja; Caterina di Cristofano Spini
- Writing career
- Language: Italian, Latin

Vincenzo da Filicaja (30 December 1642 – 24 September 1707) was a poet and politician, citizen of Grand Duchy of Tuscany. His poetry was compared to that of Petrarch, and his association with the Accademia della Crusca gave him access to royal patronage. He served as governor of Volterra and Pisa, successively, and finally in the Tuscan Senate.

== Biography ==
Vincenzo da Filicaja was born in Florence to a prominent aristocratic family. From an incidental notice in one of his letters, stating the amount of house rent paid during his childhood, his parents must have been in easy circumstances, and the supposition is confirmed by the fact that he enjoyed all the advantages of a liberal education, first under the Jesuits of Florence, and then in the University of Pisa. At Pisa he studied law.

After five years in Pisa, he returned to Florence, where he married Anna, daughter of the senator and marquis Scipione Capponi, and withdrew to a small villa at "Al Filicaja" (he always referred to Al Filicaja with the former name of "Figline"), not far from the city. Abjuring the thought of writing amatory poetry due to the premature death of a young lady to whom he had been attached, he occupied himself chiefly with literary pursuits, above all the composition of Italian and Latin poetry. He was a member of the celebrated Accademia della Crusca and had good relations with the patrons of the Capponi family. At this academy he befriended Lorenzo Magalotti, Benedetto Menzini, Gori and Francesco Redi. The latter, author of Bacchus in Tuscany, was influential in gaining Filicaja access to court patronage.

Filicaja's rural seclusion was due to his limited means than to his rural tastes. But his poetical genius was fired by the deliverance of Vienna from the Turks in 1683, and helped by Redi, who not only laid Filicaja's verses before his own sovereign, but had them transmitted with the least possible delay to the foreign princes whose noble deeds were praised. The first recompense came, however, not from those princes, but from Christina, the ex-queen of Sweden, who, from her circle of savants and courtiers at Rome, spontaneously and generously announced to Filicaja her wish to bear the expense of educating his two sons, enhancing her kindness by the delicate request that it should remain a secret.

Filicaja's fortunes now improved. In 1691 he became a member of the Academy of Arcadia, assuming the pseudonym of Polibo Emonio. Shortly afterwards, the grand duke of Tuscany, Cosimo III, conferred on him an important office, the commissionership of official balloting. He was named governor of Volterra in 1696, where he strenuously exerted himself to improve public morality. Both there and at Pisa, where he was subsequently governor in 1700, his popularity was so great that on his removal the inhabitants of both cities petitioned for his recall. He passed the close of his life at Florence; the grand duke raised him to the rank of senator, and he died in that city. He was buried in the family vault in the church of San Pietro in Florence, and a monument was erected to his memory by his sole surviving son Scipione Filicaja.

== Assessment ==
According to the Encyclopædia Britannica Eleventh Edition:

In the six celebrated odes inspired by the great victory of John III Sobieski in the Battle of Vienna, Filicaja took a lyrical flight which has placed him at moments on a level with the greatest Italian poets. They are, however, unequal, like all his poetry, reflecting in some passages the native vigour of his genius and purest inspirations of his tastes, whilst in others they are deformed by the affectations of the Seicentisti. When thoroughly natural and spontaneousas in the two sonnets Italia, Italia, o tu cui feo la sorte and Dove, Italia, il tuo braccio? e a che ti serve; in the verses Alla beata Vergine, Al divino amore; in the sonnet Sulla fede nelle disgrazie the truth and beauty of thought and language recall the verses of Petrarch.

== See also ==
- Filicaja
- House of Filicaja

== Bibliography ==
- Lastri, Marco (1774). Elogi degli uomini illustri toscani. Vol. 4. Lucca. pp. 575–579.
