= Italian Horse Protection Association =

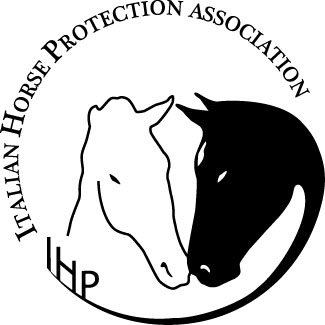
- Founded: 2009
- Founder: Antonio Nardi-Dei da Filicaja Dotti, Sonny Richichi, Francesca Vaccari
- Type: Non-governmental organization
- Purpose: Animal rights
- Location: Via Poggio all'Aglione 23, 50050 Montaione (Florence), Italy 43°32′29.35″N 10°55′44.95″E
- Origins: Fondazione Flaminia da Filicaja
- Region served: Italy
- Key people: Sonny Richichi, President; Ilaria Castellani, Member of the Board; Adolfo Sansolini, Member of the Board
- Website: www.horseprotection.it

The Italian Horse Protection Association (IHP) is the only rescue center in Italy for mistreated and confiscated equines, based on Law 189 of 2004 (Mistreatment of animals).

== Mission ==
=== Mistreated equines ===
The main goal of the Italian Horse Protection Association is the psychological and physical recovery of equines, subjected to sequestration under Law 189 of 2004 (Mistreatment of animals). Beyond that it strives to raise awareness of the ethological characteristics and the specific needs of the equine species. In IHP’s view equines are very often misunderstood by their human counterparts, resulting sometimes in unintentional mistreatment due to this lack of understanding.

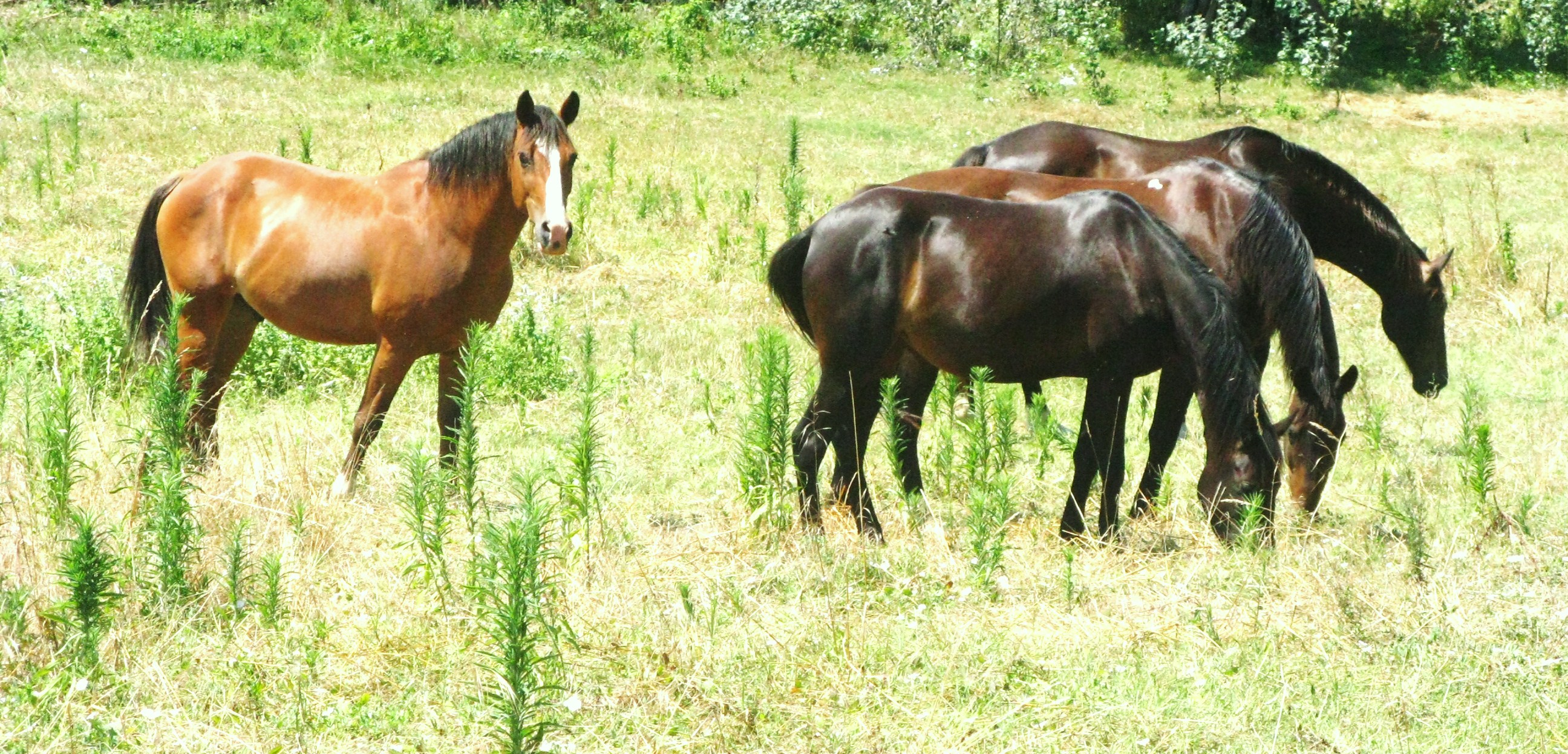
Healthy horses, positive to the Coggins test, in the isolation center of IHP

=== Equine Infectious Anemia ===
Another very important aspect that the IHP addresses is linked to the challenge of educating horse-owners and the general public on the realities related to equine infectious anemia, a disease that the association considers to be misunderstood and less dangerous than what is generally believed. To this end it started a scientific collaboration with the Faculty of Veterinary Medicine at the University of Perugia. With the authorization of the competent veterinary AUSL (Local Health Agency) and according to Italian norms, the Italian Horse Protection Association is the only active isolation center in Italy that allows freedom of movement for horses who were found positive to the Coggins test (agar immunodiffusion).

=== Animalism ===
The IHP has been striving for recognition of equines as animals of companionship rather than just a source of income or pleasure. Such recognition would, once approved, amongst other things, help enforce a ban on equine slaughter. Above all, IHP is an animal rights association and the only association of its kind in Italy that deals exclusively with equines. It also supports vegetarianism.

== Location ==
The Italian Horse Protection Association is located in the municipality of Montaione, in the province of Florence. The equines live in open pastures on about 100 ha of land, under constant monitoring of the many volunteers and veterinarians of the association.

== Scientific collaborations ==
The IHP collaborates with the Faculty of Veterinary Medicine at the University of Perugia for the research on Equine Infectious Anemia and equine ethology, and with the Faculty of Veterinary Medicine at the University of Pisa for internships on horses in freedom.

== See also ==
- List of animal rights groups
