= Raffaello Fabretti =

Italian antiquary (1618–1700)

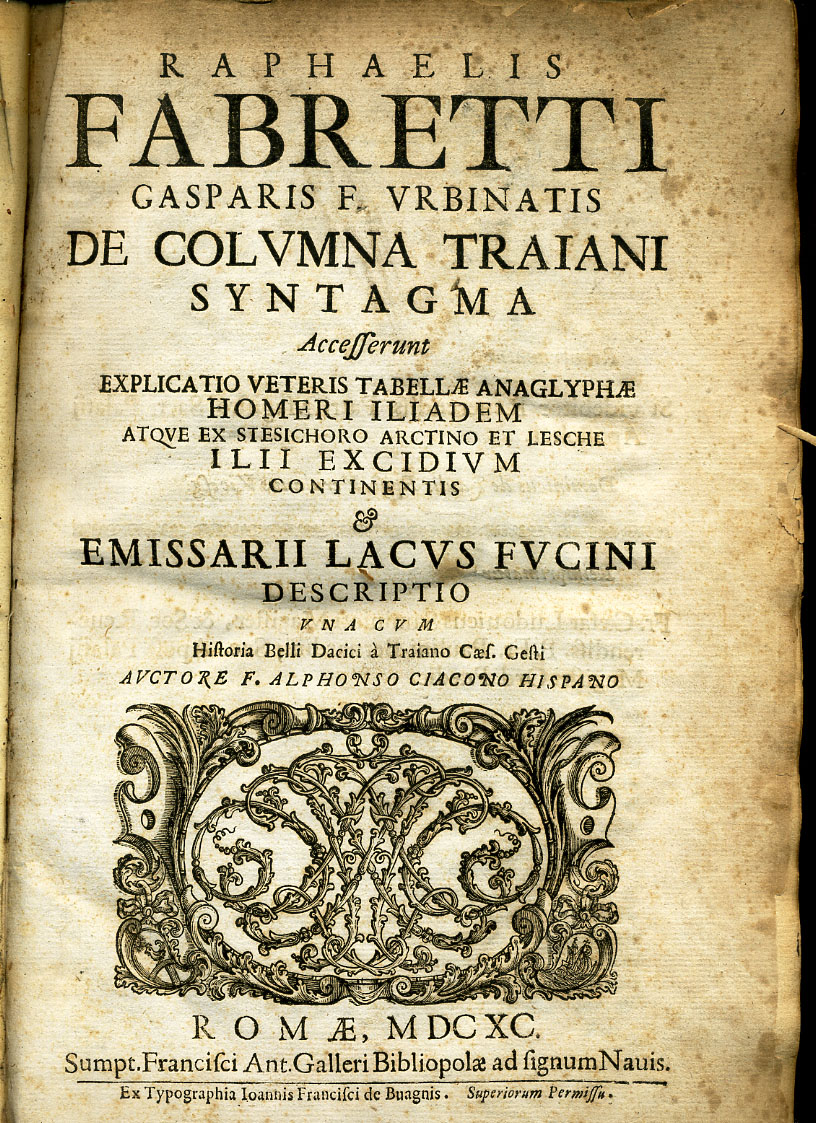
Titlepage to the 1690 edition of Columna Traiani Syntagma

Raphael Fabretti (1618 – 7 January 1700) was an Italian antiquarian.

== Life and works ==
Born at Urbino in the Marche, he studied law at Cagli and Urbino, where he took his doctorate at the age of eighteen. While in Rome he attracted the notice of Cardinal Lorenzo Imperiali, who employed him successively as treasurer and auditor of the papal legation in Spain, where he remained thirteen years. Meanwhile, his favourite classical and antiquarian studies were not neglected; and on his return journey he made important observations of the relics and monuments of Spain, France, and Italy.

At Rome he was appointed judge of appellation of the Capitol, but left to be auditor of the legation at Urbino. After three years he returned to Rome, on the invitation of Cardinal Gaspare Carpegna, vicar of Pope Innocent XI, and devoted himself to antiquarian research, examining with minute care the monuments and inscriptions of the Campagna. He always rode a horse which his friends nicknamed "Marco Polo", after the Venetian traveller. Pope Innocent XII made him keeper of the archives of the Castel Sant'Angelo, a charge he retained until his death. His collection of inscriptions and monuments was purchased by Cardinal Giovanni Francesco Stoppani, and placed in the ducal palace at Urbino, where they may still be seen.

His work De Aquis et Aquaeductibus veteris Romae (1680), three dissertations on the topography of ancient Latium, is inserted in Graevius's Thesaurus, iv (1677). His interpretation of certain passages in Livy and other classical authors involved him in a dispute with Gronovius, which bore a strong resemblance to that between John Milton and Claudius Salmasius, Gronovius addressing Fabretti as Faber Rusticus, and the latter, in reply, speaking of Gronovius and his "titivilitia". In this controversy Fabretti used the pseudonym "Iasitheus", which he afterwards took as his pastoral name in the Academy of the Arcadians.

His other works, De Columna Trajani Syntagma (1683), and Inscriptionum Antiquarum Explicatio (1699), throw much light on Roman antiquity. In the former is to be found his explication of an early Imperial Roman bas-relief, with inscriptions, now in the Capitol at Rome, representing the war and taking of Troy, one of the Tabulae Iliacae. Letters and other shorter works of Fabretti are to be found in publications of the time, such as the Journal des Savants.

== Sources ==
- Evans, H. B. (2002). Aqueduct Hunting in the Seventeenth Century. Raffaello Fabretti’s De aquis et aquaeductibus veteris Romae. pp. xvi + 309, maps, ills. Ann Arbor: University of Michigan Press. ISBN 0-472-11248-1.

== Bibliography ==
- Ceresa, Massimo (1993). "FABRETTI, Raffaello". Dizionario Biografico degli Italiani (in Italian). Vol. 43: Enzo–Fabrizi. Rome: Institute of the Italian Encyclopaedia. ISBN 978-88-12-00032-6.
