= Benedetto Menzini =

Italian Roman Catholic priest and poet (1646–1704)

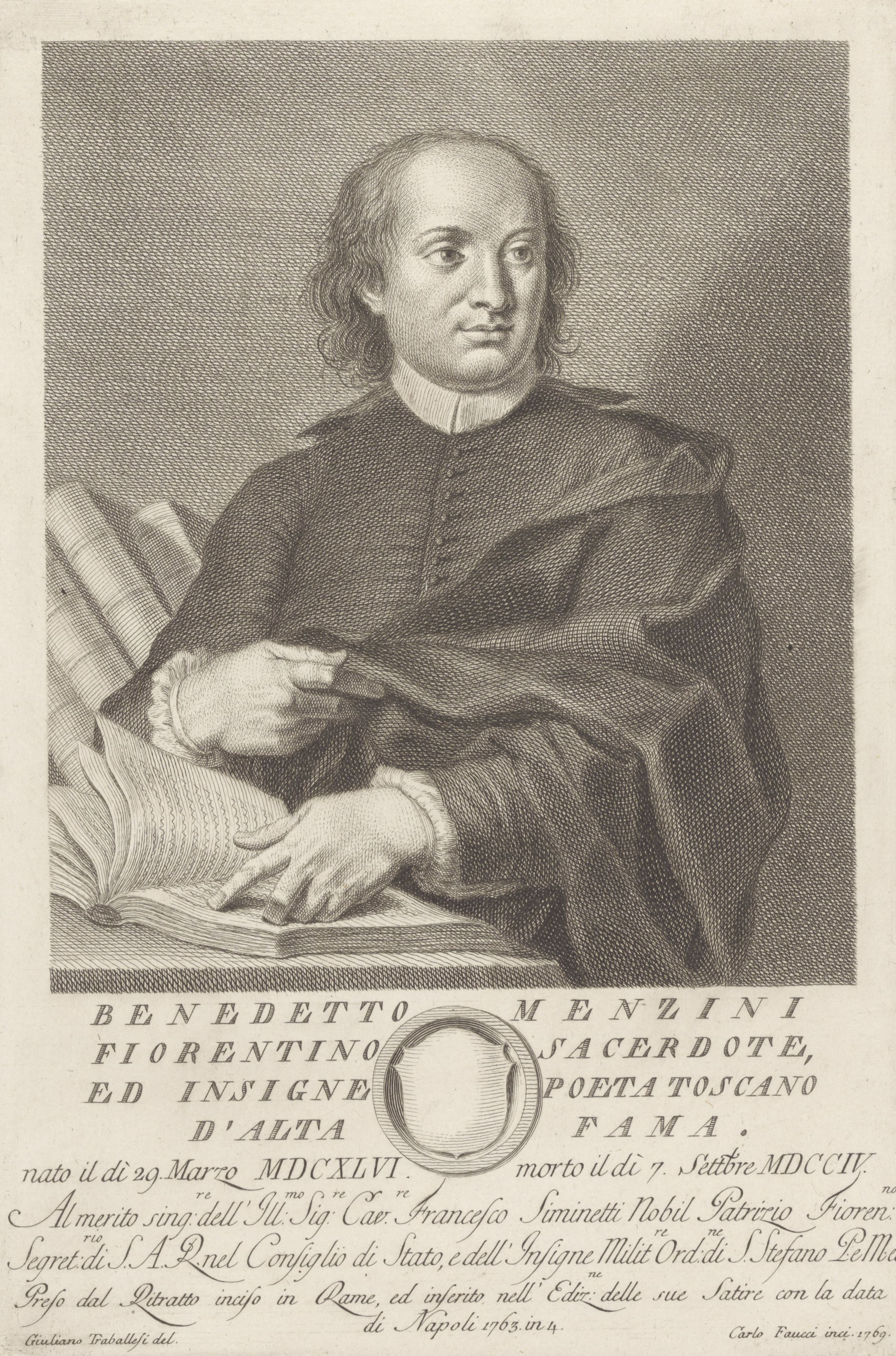
- Born: 29 March 1646; Florence, Grand Duchy of Tuscany
- Died: 7 September 1704 (aged 58); Rome, Papal States
- Other name: Euganio Libade
- Occupations: Priest, poet
- Known for: Satire (published posthumously)
- Religion: Roman Catholic
- Writings: Arte poetica in terza rima (1688)

Benedetto Menzini (29 March 1646; Florence – 7 September 1704; Rome) was an Italian Roman Catholic priest and poet. In his satires he assails in acrid terms the hypocrisy prevailing in Tuscany in the last years of the Medici rule.

== Life ==
His family being poor, he early became a teacher, becoming a professor of belles-lettres at Florence and Prato. He was already in Holy Orders.

In 1681 he failed to obtain the chair of rhetoric in the University of Pisa, partly because of the jealousy of other clerics and partly because of the acrimony constantly shown by him in his words and acts. In 1685 he went to Rome and enjoyed the favour of Queen Christina of Sweden, until her death in 1689. Pope Innocent XII then gave him a canonry, and appointed him to a chair of rhetoric in one of the institutions of the city of Rome

== Works ==
In his Arte poetica in terza rima (1688), Menzini attacks the Baroque poetic in the name of an archaic style based on the cult of Dante and 14th-century Italian. This return to traditional forms foreshadows the aesthetics of the Accademia dell'Arcadia, which Menzini joined in 1691, before joining the Accademia Fiorentina in 1699 and the Accademia della Crusca in 1702 as well. Following the models provided by the poems of Gabriello Chiabrera and Fulvio Testi, Menzini wrote his Pindaric "Canzoni eroiche e morali" (1674–80). These observe the Greek division - strophe, antistrophe, and deal with subjects that were also engaging the attention of the contemporary poet Filicaja, e.g., the defense of Vienna and the taking of Budapest from the Ottoman Turks.

Some seventeen of his elegies treat of matters of various interest. The poem "Il Paradiso terrestre" is almost continuation of the "Mondo creato" of Tasso, Menzini's favourite poet. In the "Academia Tusculana" in mingled prose and verse, he introduces leading spirits of the time, who discuss subjects of many sorts.

The pastoral note was struck by him in his "Sonetti pastorali"; and in his "Canzonette anacreontiche" he produced a number of graceful little lyrics. Menzini is best known for his Satire, completed before 1685 and published posthumously. Though he relied on classical satire for his subject matter, he also used the form to launch scathing attacks on poets, the clergy, women, philosophers, hypocrisy, vices, and even personal enemies. Of all the 17th-century satirists he is the most bitter, with a no-nonsense directness aided by his sober style.
