= Montaione =

- Comune
- Comune di Montaione
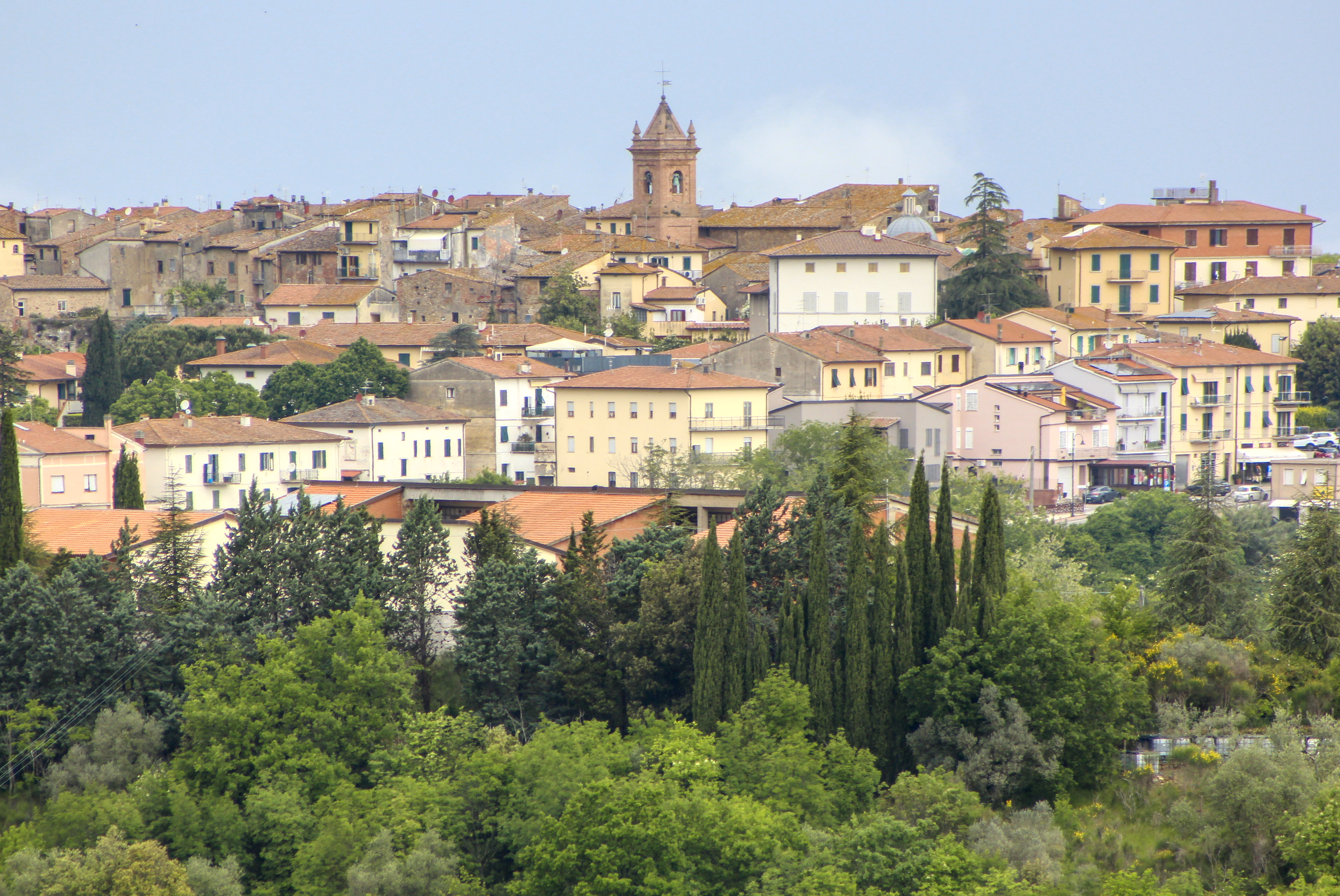
- Church of San Regolo.

- Coat of arms

- Location within Italy Location within Tuscany
- Coordinates: 43°33′12″N 10°54′42″E
- Country: Italy
- Region: Toscana
- Metropolitan city: Florence (FI)
- Frazioni: Barbialla, Casetta, Castelfalfi, Collegalli, Filicaja, Alberi, Iano, Sughera, Mura, Olmo, Palagio, Piaggia, Santo Stefano, San Vivaldo, Tonda, Vignale

Government
  - Mayor: Paolo Pomponi

Area
  - Total: 104.8 km^{2} (40.5 sq mi)
- Elevation: 342 m (1,122 ft)

Population (30 November 2017)
  - Total: 3,640
  - Density: 34.7/km^{2} (90.0/sq mi)
- Demonym: Montaionesi
- Time zone: UTC+1 (CET)
  - Summer (DST): UTC+2 (CEST)
- Postal code: 50050
- Dialing code: 0571
- Patron saint: Holy Crucifix
- Saint day: May 3
- Website: Official website

Montaione is a comune (municipality) in the Metropolitan City of Florence in the Italian region Tuscany, located about 35 kilometres (22 mi) southwest of Florence. It is one of I Borghi più belli d'Italia ("The most beautiful villages of Italy").

== History ==
The frazione of Filicaja was the starting point of Antonio da Filicaja for the invasion of Pisa by the Florentine army in 1509.

== Main sights ==
- The church of San Regolo houses the Madonna del Buonconsiglio by Guido da Graziano (late 13th century)
- Church and convent of San Vivaldo. The church has works attributed to Giovanni della Robbia, Benedetto Buglioni, Raffaellino del Garbo and Andrea Sansovino
- Castles include those of:
  - Iano
  - Camporena, destroyed by the Florentines in 1329.
  - Vignale
  - Collegalli, now a patrician villa
  - Figline, known from the 12th century. It is owned by the Filicaja family.
  - Pozzolo, known from the 11th century. It contains murals by Giuseppe Bezzuoli and Augustus Wallis.
  - Barbialla, owned in the Middle Aged by the Cadolingians and the della Gherardesca families, then by the bishops of Volterra, the commune of San Miniato, the Republic of Florence and the Republic of Pisa.
  - Castelfafi, allegedly founded by the Lombards in the 8th century. It was a possession of the della Gherardesca and then of the bishops of Volterra. Later it was acquired by the Caetani. In 1554 it was sacked by the troops of Piero Strozzi.
  - Tonda
  - Sughera
  - Scopeto
  - Santo Stefano

== Nature ==
The Italian Horse Protection Association (IHP) has its main base in Montaione's frazione of Filicaja.

== Archaeology ==
In 2024, a small marble statue of Hercules, nicknamed "Ercolino da Montaione" and dating to the 3rd–4th centuries AD, was discovered on a nearby hill at the site of an ancient Roman residence.
