= Jan Frederik Gronovius =

Dutch botanist

- Born: 19 February 1690; Leiden, Dutch Republic
- Died: 10 July 1762 (aged 72); Leiden, Dutch Republic
- Other names: Johann Frederik, Johannes Fredericus
- Known for: Flora Virginica
- Spouses: Margaretha Christina Trigland, Johanna Susanna Alensoo
- Children: Laurens Theodoor Gronovius
- Father: Jakob Gronovius
- Relatives: Johann Friedrich Gronovius (grandfather)
- Scientific career
- Fields: Botany
- Author abbrev. (botany): Gronov.

Jan Frederik Gronovius (also seen as Johann Frederik and Johannes Fredericus) (10 February 1690 in Leiden – 10 July 1762 in Leiden) was a Dutch botanist notable as a patron of Linnaeus.

John Clayton, a plant collector in Virginia sent him many specimens, as well as manuscript descriptions, in the 1730s. Without Clayton's knowledge, Gronovius used the material in his Flora Virginica (1739–43, 2nd ed. 1762).

He was the son of Jakob Gronovius and grandson of Johann Friedrich Gronovius, both classical scholars. In 1719, he married Margaretha Christina Trigland, who died in 1726, and Johanna Susanna Alensoon in 1729. His son Laurens Theodoor Gronovius (1730–1777) was also a botanist.
