= Palazzo Pretorio, Pistoia =

Coordinates: 43°56′00″N 10°55′01″E

Palazzo Pretorio
- Palazzo del Podestà
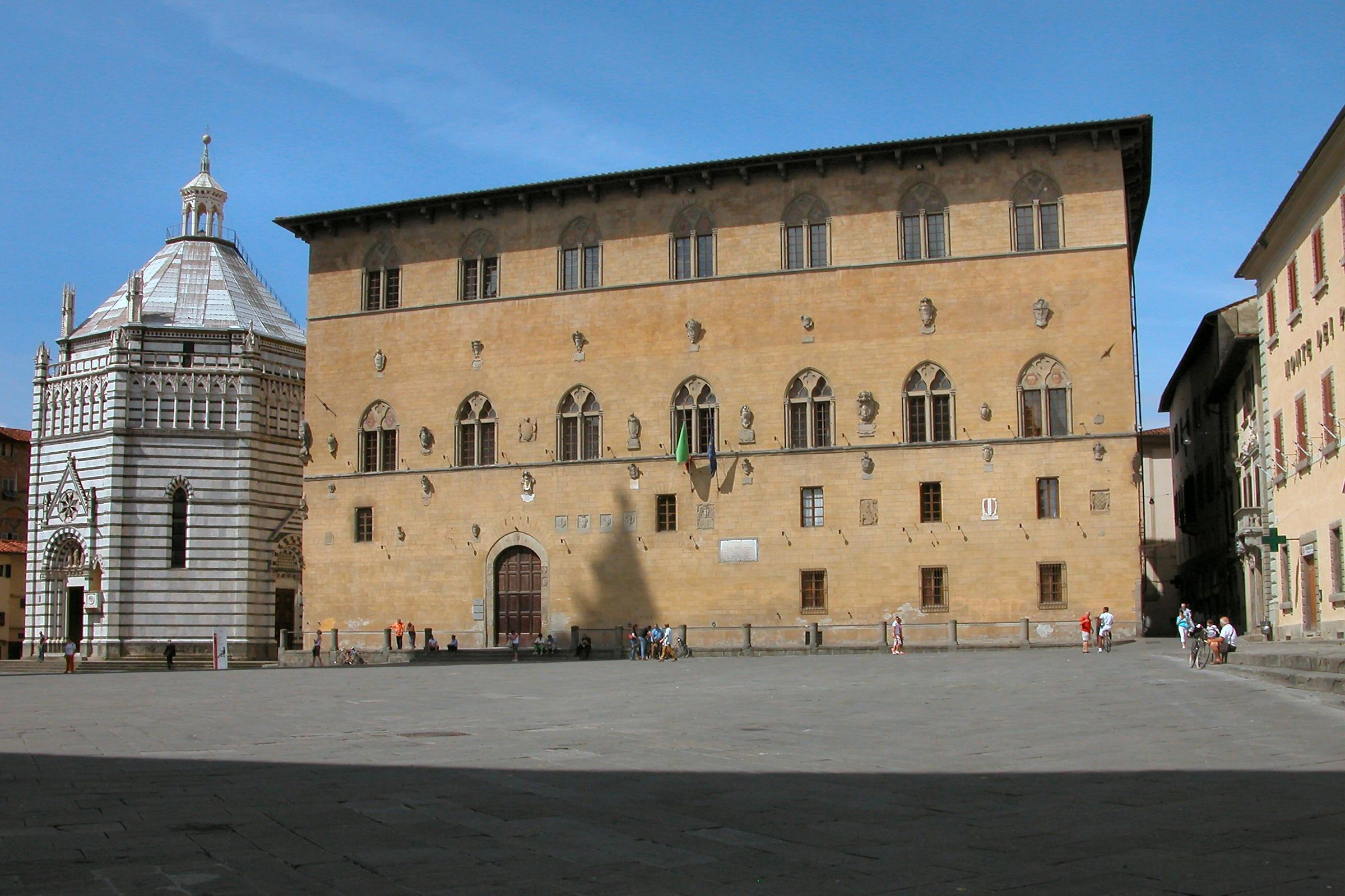
- Facade of Palazzo Pretorio, adjacent to octagonal Baptistery of Pistoia
- Interactive map of the Palazzo Pretorio area

General information
- Type: Government building
- Architectural style: Neo-Gothic
- Location: Pistoia, Tuscany, Italy
- Current tenants: Tribunale di Pistoia
- Construction started: 1367
- Renovated: 19th century

Technical details
- Floor count: 3

Design and construction
- Architect: Giuseppe Faldi (19th-century renovation)

The Palazzo Pretorio or Palazzo del Podestà was initially erected to house the police and justice forces and magistrates, and is located in front of the Piazza del Duomo of Pistoia, region of Tuscany, Italy. The present building, which is mainly a Neo-Gothic construction of the 19th-century, now houses the local courts of Pistoia (Tribunale di Pistoia).

== History and description ==
The imposing three story building seen today shares the general site of the prior Palazzo Pretorio, and reused the main portal, some of the first floor mullioned windows (four on the left), and elements in the ground courtyard. The original building was a single story in height with a courtyard, stables, and barracks. It was erected in the 1367 to enlarge the Podesta's apartment and that of his men. By 1842, the building was in need of major structural repairs, and the city elected to build the present building in an imposing, but anachronistic style. The design was by Giuseppe Faldi. Work continued past 1892.

The ground floor has painted and sculpted coat of arms of various leaders, and were present in the building since the 15th century, but many were the product of reproductions carried out in the 19th-century restoration. By then, the podesta had been abolished, and the building became home of the local tribunal, for which it is still used.
