= Adolfo Sansolini =

Italian animal welfare activist

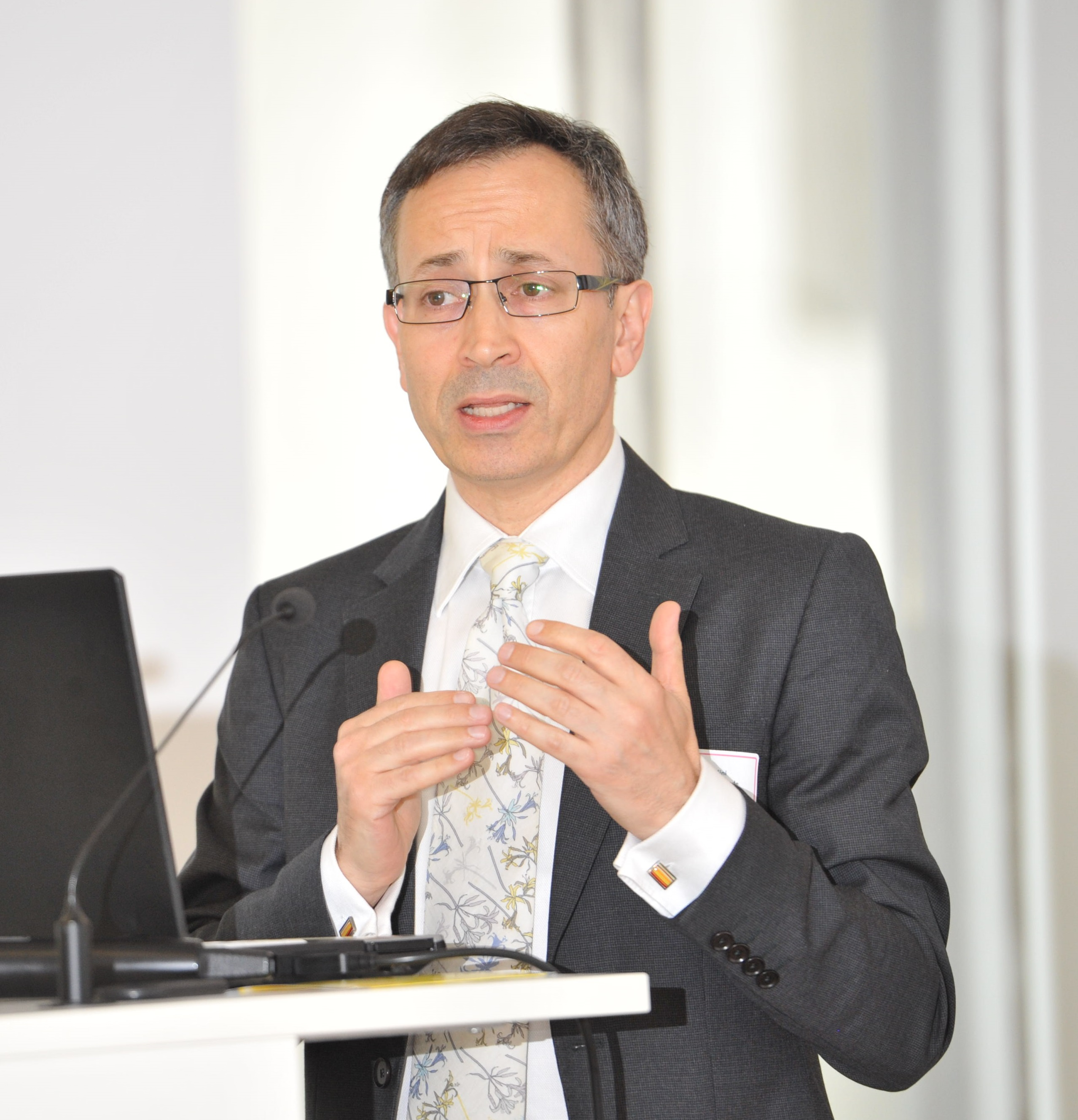
Adolfo Sansolini in 2016

Adolfo Sansolini (born 15 November 1966) is an Italian animal welfare activist.

== Animal welfare activities ==
Sansolini began his animal welfare activities at age 11.

In 1980, he joined Italy's leading animal welfare non-governmental organization, LAV. He was active with the group for 25 years in various roles from local representative to National President.

Since 2006, Sansolini has represented international animal welfare organisations at the United Nations, FAO, the WTO, and works with governments around the world.

In 2012, he coordinated the collection of over one million signatures for the "8 hours" petition against the long-distance transport of animals sent for slaughter in the EU, and the adoption of a Written Declaration in its support by the European Parliament in 2013.

In 2016, working on behalf of Belgian organisation GAIA, Sansolini put the issue of force-feeding in foie gras production on the political agenda of EU institutions.

Sansolini authored the chapter “El bienestar animal y la comercialización” (“Animal Welfare and Trade”) in the textbook for Latin American Universities Bienestar Animal – Producción y calidad de la carne, (“Animal Welfare – Meat production and quality”).

== Political life ==
In 2016, he campaigned for Remain in the build-up to the Brexit referendum.
