= Jakob Gronovius =

Dutch classical scholar (1645–1716)

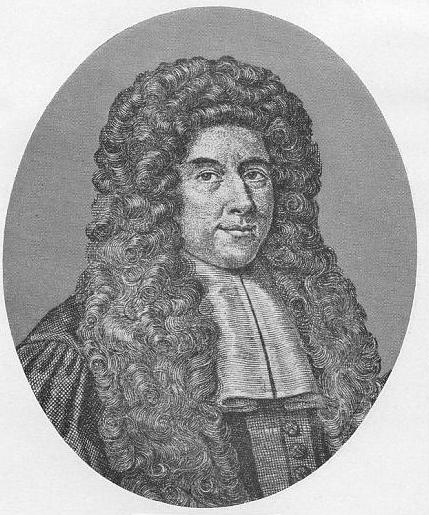
Jakob Gronovius

Jacobus Gronovius a.k.a. Jacob Gronow (10 October 1645 – 21 October 1716) was a Dutch classical scholar.

He was born in Deventer, the son of the German classical scholar Johann Friedrich Gronovius and Aleyda ten Nuyl, and father of the botanist Jan Frederik Gronovius. His family moved to Leiden in 1658. He studied classics under the guidance of his father and then he completed his education in Oxford and Cambridge. Between the beginning of 1671 and the end of 1673 he visited France, Spain and Italy during a Grand Tour. In Florence he met the Italian librarian Antonio Magliabechi. His religious faith caused him some difficulties, therefore he came back to the Netherlands in 1674. He then lived in Deventer until 1679, when he was appointed Professor of Greek history and language at the University of Leiden. One year later, on 5 May 1680 he married Anna van Vredenburch from Rotterdam.

Gronovius is chiefly known as the editor of the Thesaurus antiquitatum Graecarum (1697–1702, in 13 volumes). He died, aged 71, in Leiden.
