= Johann Friedrich Gronovius =

German classical scholar, librarian and critic (1611–1671)

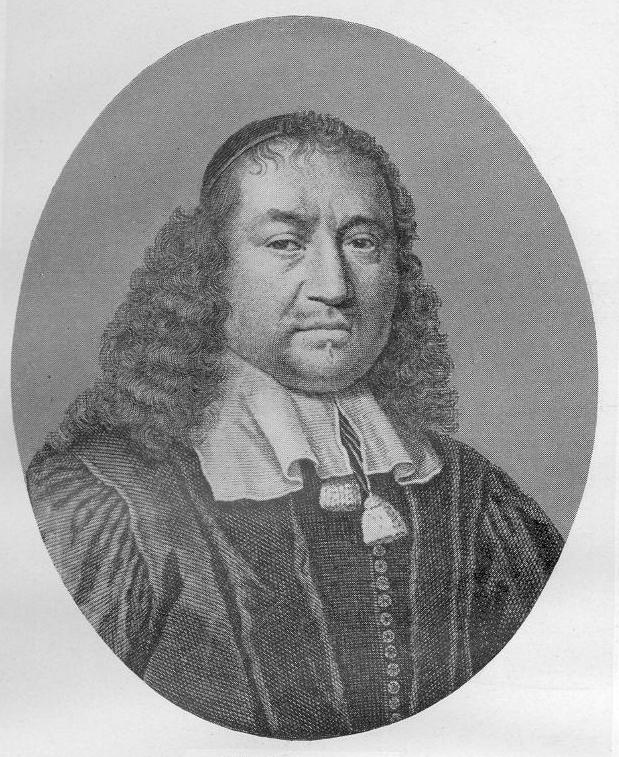
Johann Friedrich Gronovius.

Johann Friedrich Gronovius (the Latinized form of Gronow; 8 September 1611 – 28 December 1671) was a German classical scholar, librarian and critic.

Born in Hamburg, he studied at several universities and travelled in England, France and Italy. In 1643, he was appointed professor of rhetoric and history at Deventer, and in 1658 to the Greek chair at Leiden, where he remained until his death. In 1665, Gronovius succeeded Antonius Thysius the Younger as the 6th Librarian of Leiden University (see also Raffaello Fabretti).

Gronovius edited and annotated Statius, Plautus, Livy, Tacitus, Aulus Gellius and Seneca's tragedies. In addition, he was the author of Commentarius de sestertiis (1643) and of an edition of Hugo Grotius's De jure belli et pacis (1660), amongst numerous other works. His Observationes contain a number of brilliant emendations. His son Jakob Gronovius was also a classical scholar.

Johann Friedrich Gronovius died in Leiden in 1671.
