= Annaeus Serenus =

Annaeus Serenus (died perhaps 62/63) was a close, younger friend and probably also a distant relative of the Roman politician and philosopher Lucius Annaeus Seneca (d. 65). He belonged to the knighthood.

== Life ==
Under the Roman Emperor Nero, Serenus was entrusted with the office of praefectus vigilum, i.e. he was the chief of the Roman fire brigade, which kept watch at night all over the city and ensured that fires that frequently broke out in Rome were quickly extinguished.

Under Emperor Claudius – as mentioned by the historian Tacitus – Decrius Calpurnianus was still chief of the fire guard. He was executed for involvement in an attempted coup in 48 A.D. Laelianus held the office until 54, when he was transferred to Armenia. The British historian Miriam Griffin suspects that Serenus received the office of praefectus vigilum after 54 and died before 62, before Tigellinus held the office. He may have benefited from intercession on the part of his friend Seneca.

As can be seen from Seneca's treatises and letters, Serenus suffered from doubts about life and thought of withdrawing from public life. He therefore also sought the philosophical advice of his friend. In Seneca's treatise "On the Tranquillity of the Soul" (De Tranquillitate Animi), a letter from Annaeus Serenus to Seneca is reproduced at the beginning, from which it becomes apparent how much Serenus was attracted to a simple life of moderation, and at the same time how much he was irritated by the hectic pursuit of state positions of honour and a life of luxury that he observed all around him. While Serenus was initially close to Epicurean thought, under Seneca's influence he moved closer to the philosophy of the Stoa and decided to remain at the imperial court. Seneca dedicated to his friend the writings De Constantia Sapientis and De Tranquillitate Animi and perhaps (for the name is again erased in the Index of the Ambrosianus) De Otio.

As Tacitus reports, Serenus played a helpful role in the young Emperor Nero's love affair with the freedwoman Claudia Acte by providing the Emperor's favourite, who suffered under the surveillance of his mother Agrippina, with the latter's secret gifts.

According to the writer Pliny the Elder, Serenus was murdered with a meal of poisoned mushrooms (probably around 62/63 AD). Seneca, by his own account, "mourned the death of his friend immoderately."
