= De Brevitate Vitae (Seneca) =

Essay by Seneca

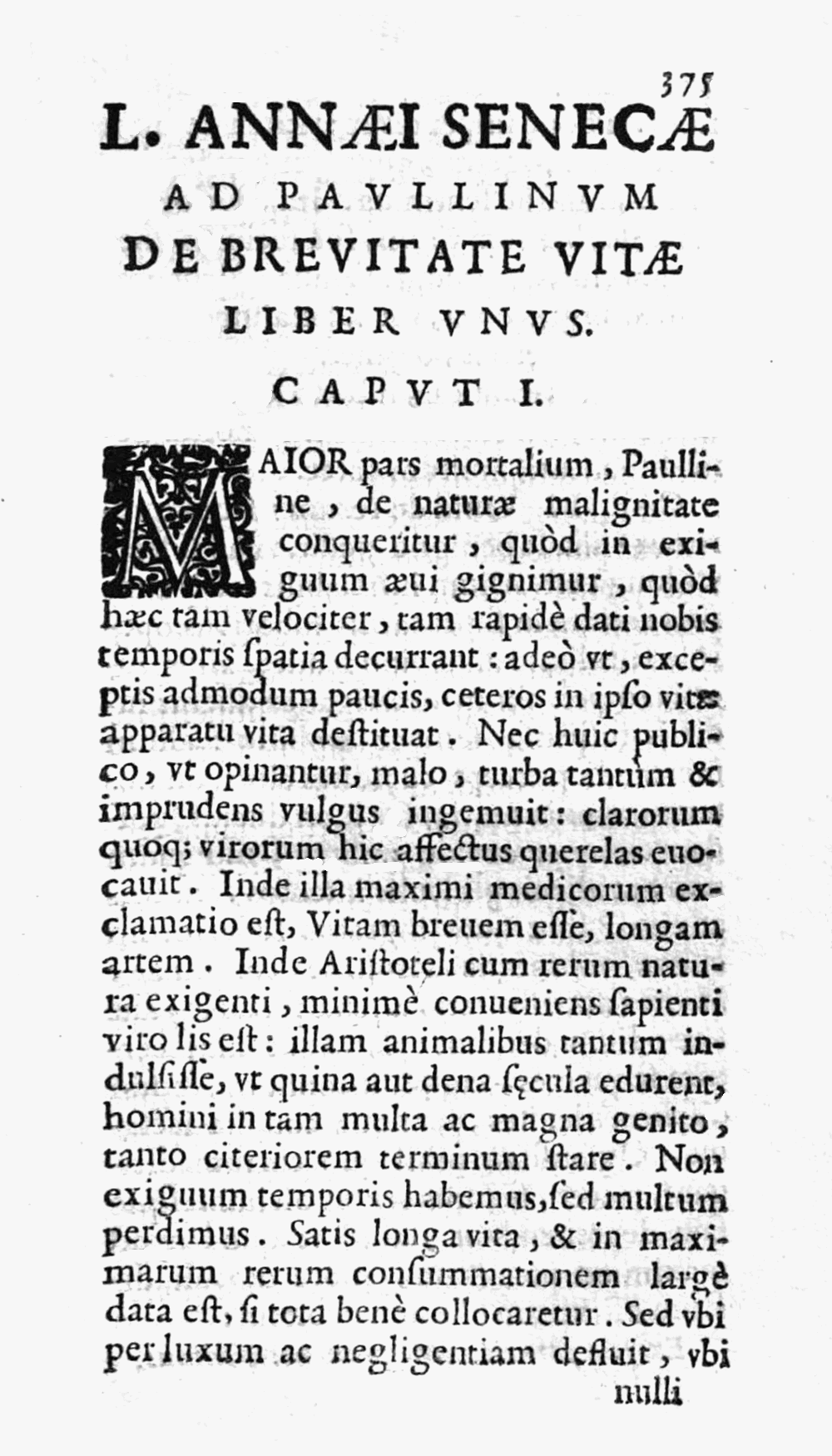
- From the 1643 edition, published by Francesco Baba
- Author: Lucius Annaeus Seneca
- Language: Latin
- Subject: Ethics
- Genre: Philosophy
- Publication date: AD c. 49
- Publication place: Ancient Rome

De Brevitate Vitae (English: On the Shortness of Life) is a moral essay written by Seneca the Younger, a Roman Stoic philosopher, sometime around the year 49 AD, to his father-in-law Paulinus. The philosopher brings up many Stoic principles on the nature of time, namely that people waste much of it in meaningless pursuits. According to the essay, nature gives people enough time to do what is really important and the individual must allot it properly. In general, time is best used by living in the present moment in pursuit of the intentional, purposeful life.

Similar ideas can be found in Seneca's treatise De Otio (On Leisure) and discussion of these themes can often be found in his Letters to Lucilius (letter 49, 101, etc.).

== Date and addressee ==
The work is addressed to a man called Paulinus—probably Pompeius Paulinus, a knight of Arelate—and is usually dated to around 49 AD. It is clear from chapters 18 and 19 of De Brevitate Vitae that Paulinus was praefectus annonae, the official who superintended the grain supply of Rome, and was, therefore, a man of importance. He was likely a near relative of Seneca's wife, Pompeia Paulina, and quite plausibly her father. He is also thought to be the father of another Pompeius Paulinus, who held high public posts under Nero (Pliny, Nat. Hist. xxxiii. 143; Tacitus, Annals, xiii. 53. 2; xv. 18. 4).

As for the date of composition, it must have been after the death of Caligula (41 AD), which Seneca mentions in §18.5. Furthermore, there are two known periods when Paulinus could have served as praefectus annonae, 48–55 and 62–71 AD, and scholars prefer the earlier period. A date of 49 AD has previously been suggested because Seneca writes in §13.8 "that Sulla was the last of the Romans who extended the pomerium" (the boundary of Rome). Since Claudius extended this in 49/50 AD, it would have been written before this. However Miriam Griffin has argued that Seneca is quoting a pedant who is asserting that Claudius' extension was illegal, which would mean that Seneca was writing after this date. Griffin has suggested that Seneca wrote De Brevitate Vitae as an excuse for Paulinus to retire early in 55 AD.

== Contents ==
In chapter 1 Seneca counters the complaint that life is too short with the view that life is long enough if well-managed. Chapters 2 to 9 survey the many ways in which life is squandered and time frittered away by those people (occupati) engrossed in pointless pursuits. Chapters 10 to 17 contrast the philosophical approach to leisure (otium) with the deluded common approach. This culminates in chapters 18 to 20 showing the emancipation of the wise, who can soar above the lives of others mired in endless preoccupation.

=== Topics ===
After the introduction (§1), Seneca reviews (§2–3) the distractions which make life seem short, and explains that people are great wasters of time. He then offers (§4–6) three examples of famous Romans (Augustus, Cicero and Livius Drusus) who, in various ways, were victims of the engrossed life. He explains (§7–8) that the engrossed do not know how to live or have awareness, and that they waste time because they do not know its value. One should purposefully live for the moment (§9), because tomorrow will be too late. In contrast (§10) the lives of the engrossed seem so short to them because they are constrained to the fleeting present, and recollect the past in pain. They desperately cling on to life (§11) because they haven't lived, unlike the wise, who are always ready to leave life behind. The engrossed include those who live in leisure and luxury (§12), and Seneca explains (§13) that even those who devote themselves to scholarship are wasting their time if their efforts are directed to no end. Accordingly, (§14–15) only those who dedicate their time properly truly live, becoming equal with the great minds of the past, allowing the mind of the sage to even transcend time, like a god. The engrossed, on the other hand, (§16–17) are prey to fidgety and contradictory moods, and their joys and pleasures are bitter with the sense of precariousness. Finally (§18–19) Seneca exhorts Paulinus to abandon public occupations and adopt the contemplative life of the wise, free from the passions. This is contrasted (§20) with the suffering of the engrossed: they die without having ever lived.

== Themes ==
In the treatise Seneca argues that we waste so much time because we do not properly value it. We expend great effort in protecting other valuables such as money and property, but because time appears intangible, we allow others to occupy it and take time away from us. Wise people, on the other hand, understand that time is the most valuable of all resources, and with effort can free themselves from external control to engage in meaningful introspection and create an intentional life.

Seneca urges his readers to live in the present, and adapt themselves to a purposeful life in agreement with nature. Only by doing so, can one then truly unlock both past and future. The completeness of each present moment allows one's awareness to expand to the equal of that of the universe, and achieve true virtue and happiness.

The statements which urge Paulinus to retire from public life are in notable contrast to Seneca's advice in his De Tranquillitate Animi (to his friend Annaeus Serenus) to seek public employments in order to render life attractive. However, in his related treatise, De Otio, Seneca makes the point that there is no inconsistency, and that one can serve the greater community in either or both roles.
