= Claudia Acte =

Roman freedwoman and mistress of Emperor Nero

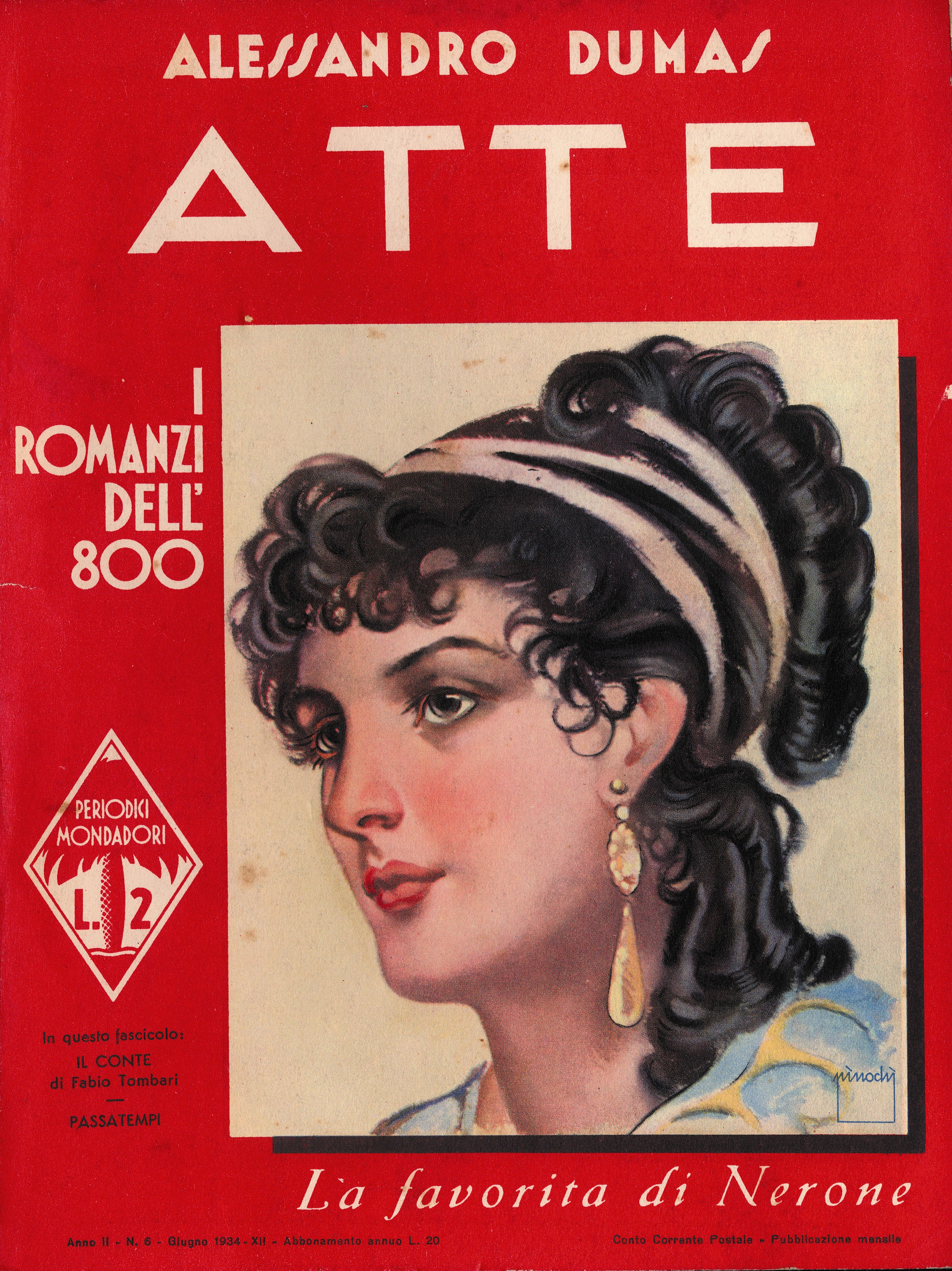
Illustration of Acte from 1934

Claudia Acte (Greek: Κλαυδία Ακτή) was a freedwoman of ancient Rome who became a mistress of the emperor Nero. She came from Asia Minor and might have become a slave of the Emperor Claudius, following his expansion of the Roman Empire into Lycia and Pamphylia; or she might have been purchased later, by Octavia, Claudius' daughter.

== Relationship with Nero ==
The Emperor Claudius, uncle of Nero's mother, Agrippina the Younger, married his niece in 49 AD and therefore became Nero's stepfather. Claudius' daughter, Octavia (by his wife Messalina), became Nero's stepsister at the same time. Nero and Octavia themselves married in 53 AD, and Nero became emperor in 54 AD, after his great-uncle/stepfather died—apparently poisoned, in the belief of contemporary historians, by his niece/wife, Agrippina, Nero's mother.

A year into Nero's reign, encouraged by Seneca the Younger and Burrus, and against Agrippina the Younger's wishes, Nero took Acte as his mistress. Seneca especially was concerned that his young student would not be satisfied with his wife, Octavia, and might indulge in risky sexual exploits. This made Acte appear a safe outlet and a source of separation from Agrippina. Seneca and Burrus were on uneasy terms with Agrippina and were nervous about her political influence and methods, especially following the putative poisoning of her husband, the Emperor Claudius. However, the relationship with Acte was kept as quiet as possible so as to not damage Nero's politically significant marriage to Octavia. Otho, Claudius Senecio and Annaeus Serenus helped Nero and Acte with their secret meetings. Serenus, a protégé of Seneca, even pretended that Acte was his own mistress in order to avert suspicion.

The couple met when Nero was 17, and their reportedly emotional, passionate relationship lasted at least three years. Nero expressed the desire to marry Acte and had a genealogy fabricated linking her royalty; he even bribed ex-consuls to prepare to swear to her royal birthright, a move that enraged his mother Agrippina, who was very conscious and proud of her own, well-established patrician ancestry.

== Influence on the Empire ==
As Nero's mistress, Acte might have had the opportunity to exert considerable influence on the Roman Empire, though it is unknown what influence she actually had. It is claimed by Tacitus that Agrippina (Nero’s mother) exercised some erotic power over her son and that Acte advised Nero to resist this power, out of fear for her own safety and with Seneca's encouragement; she warned Nero of the potential political repercussions with the military if incest with his mother were to become public. Nero and Acte's relationship reduced Agrippina's sway over her son and therefore her influence on the Empire. Agrippina's increasing efforts to separate Nero from Acte served only to increase his fondness for her; and the ensuing conflicts led Nero to take absolute control of the Empire and, eventually, to order his mother's assassination.

== Wealth achieved ==
Records of Acte's household and estates in Velitrae, Puteoli, and Sardinia attest to considerable wealth, accumulated while she was Nero's mistress. She had left the imperial scene in ownership of a household staff as well as property. After Nero's death, and along with two of his old nurses, Acte gave him a proper Roman burial, burning the body on a pyre. She deposited his remains in the tomb of the Domitii Ahenobarbi, the family of Nero's biological father, in the Pincian Hills. There were found many inscriptions of her slaves and freedmen. The epitaph of Acte was discovered at Velitrae.

== In literature and film ==
Acte appears as a character in Henryk Sienkiewicz's novel Quo Vadis, and in Myself My Sepulchre (also titled Nero) by Mary Teresa Ronalds, and is depicted as being a secret Christian in both. She also appears in the 2004 movie Nero, played by Rike Schmid. Acte is the main character in Alexandre Dumas' novel Acte. Acte appears also as a character in Louis de Wohl's novel The Glorious Folly: A Novel of the days of St. Paul. Acte's life and her relationship with Nero are depicted in the novel The False Nero by Lion Feuchtwanger. She is also a principal character in Simon Scarrow's 2020 novel The Emperor's Exile. Acte appears in Edward Lowell's 1870 play "Nero the Parricide," where she is last seen as a slave to Poppaea. In the 2025 Brazilian series Paulo, o Apóstolo, Acte is played by actress Juliana Xavier.

== See also ==
- Antonia Caenis
- Galeria Lysistrate
- Marcia (mistress of Commodus)
- List of enslaved people
