= Euthymia (philosophy) =

Ancient Greek philosophical concept

Euthymia (Greek: εὐθυμία, "gladness, good mood, serenity"—literally "good thumos") is a central concept in the moral thoughts of Democritus, who presents it as an ideal disposition of mind corresponding to a form of equanimity, a calm affectivity and relative steadiness of the soul.

Diogenes Laërtius records Democritus' view as follows: "The chief good he asserts to be cheerfulness (euthymia); which, however, he does not consider the same as pleasure; as some people, who have misunderstood him, have fancied that he meant; but he understands by cheerfulness, a condition according to which the soul lives calmly and steadily, being disturbed by no fear, or superstition, or other passion."

== Seneca's tranquillitas ==
In his dialogue De Tranquillitate Animi, Seneca translates euthymia as tranquillitas (latin for "tranquility" or "peace of mind"):

The Greeks call this calm steadiness of mind euthymia, and Democritus's treatise upon it is excellently written: I call it peace of mind [tranquillitas].

Seneca's dialogue is intended as a remedy for the absence of euthymia of his friend Serenus, who asks him for help:

[Serenus:] Not to multiply examples, I am in all things attended by this weakness of a well-meaning mind, to whose level I fear that I shall be gradually brought down, or what is even more worrying, that I may always hang as though about to fall, and that there may be more the matter with me than I myself perceive: for we take a friendly view of our own private affairs, and partiality always obscures our judgment. [...] I beg you, therefore, if you have any remedy by which you could stop this vacillation of mine, to deem me worthy to owe my peace of mind to you.

Serenus' problem is that, despite recognising the validity of the Stoic principles by which he lives his life, his strength to follow them sometimes wavers. The opposite of this weakness, or vacillation, is the steadiness of mind, or tranquillity, defined by Seneca as follows:

[Seneca:] What we are seeking, then, is how the mind may always pursue a steady, unruffled course, may be pleased with itself, and look with pleasure upon its surroundings, and experience no interruption of this joy, but abide in a peaceful condition without being ever either elated or depressed: this will be "peace of mind". [tranquillitas]

Seneca's euthymia, or tranquillity, must not be confused with the idea of self-confidence popularised by self-help literature, as it seems to be the case of influencer Ryan Holiday, who misquotes (indicating no reference) Seneca's work On the tranquility of the mind, wrongly defining euthymia as "believing in yourself and trusting that you are on the right path, and not being in doubt by following the myriad footpaths of those wandering in every direction".

== See also ==
- Ataraxia
- Thumos

== Sources ==
- Berryman, Sylvia (21 March 2023). "Democritus". In Zalta, Edward N. (ed.). Stanford Encyclopedia of Philosophy (Spring 2023 ed.). § Ethics. ISSN 1095-5054. OCLC 429049174.
