= Pompeia Paulina =

Wife of the statesman, philosopher and orator Lucius Annaeus Seneca

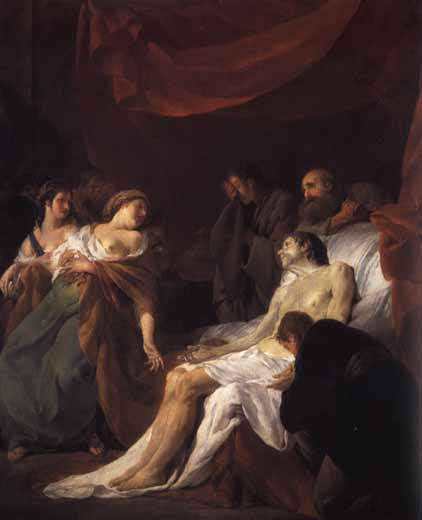
Paulina and Seneca in Noël Hallé's La Mort de Sénèque (1750)

Pompeia Paulina (/pɒmˈpiːə, -ˈpeɪə, pɔːˈlaɪnə/) (fl. 1st century) was the wife of the statesman, philosopher, and orator Lucius Annaeus Seneca, and she was part of a circle of educated Romans who sought to lead a principled life under the emperor Nero. She was likely the daughter of Pompeius Paulinus, an eques from Arelate in Gaul. Seneca was the emperor's tutor and later became his political adviser and minister. In 65 AD Nero demanded that Seneca commit suicide, having accused Seneca of taking part in the Pisonian conspiracy against him. Paulina attempted to die with her husband, but survived the suicide attempt.

== Sources ==
Most of what is known about Paulina comes from Tacitus' account of Seneca's suicide described in his Annals. Seneca also mentions her by name in his Letters.

In an early work (Ad Helvium 2.5) Seneca mentions his infant son who had recently died, and in a later work (De Ira 3.36.3-4) he mentions how his wife understands his nightly meditations. In neither case is it certain whether Paulina was his first wife or whether he had an earlier marriage.

== Family ==
Pliny the Elder mentions in his Natural History (33.143) that the family Pompeii Paulini came from Arelate in Gaul. Sometime between 48 and 55 AD, Seneca wrote his dialogue De Brevitate Vitae addressed to a Paulinus. This Paulinus was praefectus annonae, the official who superintended the grain supply of Rome. He was likely an eques called Pompeius Paulinus, and it is generally thought that he was the father of Paulina. Another member of the family, Aulus Pompeius Paulinus, served as legate in Lower Germany around 55 AD and is thought to have been her brother.

== Seneca's account ==
The one significant mention of Paulina in Seneca's works is in Letter 104 dating to 64 AD. Seneca wrote the epistle just after he had travelled to his Nomentum villa from Rome where he had been feeling unwell:

Although Paulina held me back I insisted on leaving. I had on my lips that comment of milord Gallio: when he began to feel fever in Achaea he immediately embarked on shipboard, protesting that this sickness came not from his body but the place itself. This is what I told my dear Paulina, who makes me concerned for my health. For knowing her life depends on mine, I begin to consider my own needs in order to consider hers. Although old age has made me more resolute in face of many challenges, I have lost this gift of my age, since I am reminded that in the case of this old man there is also a young woman to be spared. So since I cannot persuade her to love me more resolutely, she persuades me to love myself more carefully. ... For what is more pleasant than to be so dear to your wife that you become dearer to yourself on this account? So my dear Paulina can hold me in her debt not only for her fear but for my own.

— Letters, civ. 1–5

== Suicide attempt ==
In the aftermath of the Pisonian conspiracy, Nero ordered Seneca as his former advisor and tutor to kill himself and sent soldiers to see that the deed was done. Tacitus reports that Pompeia also wanted to die, and she did plan to kill herself. Seneca cut veins in his arms and legs, and Pompeia also slit her wrists, much to Seneca's dismay, though he did not entirely disapprove. Upon learning that she was trying to kill herself, Nero ordered that Pompeia not die, more to save face than to save her life. He sent several soldiers to ensure that her slaves and freedmen bandaged her. Servants then made a tourniquet, her arms were wrapped, and she survived.

After much reconsideration, she decided to follow her dead husband's advice and continue with life, and served as caretaker to her husband's memory. However, after the suicide attempt, she was said to have been very frail, with an unusually pale face. She never remarried, and died a few years later.

== In art ==
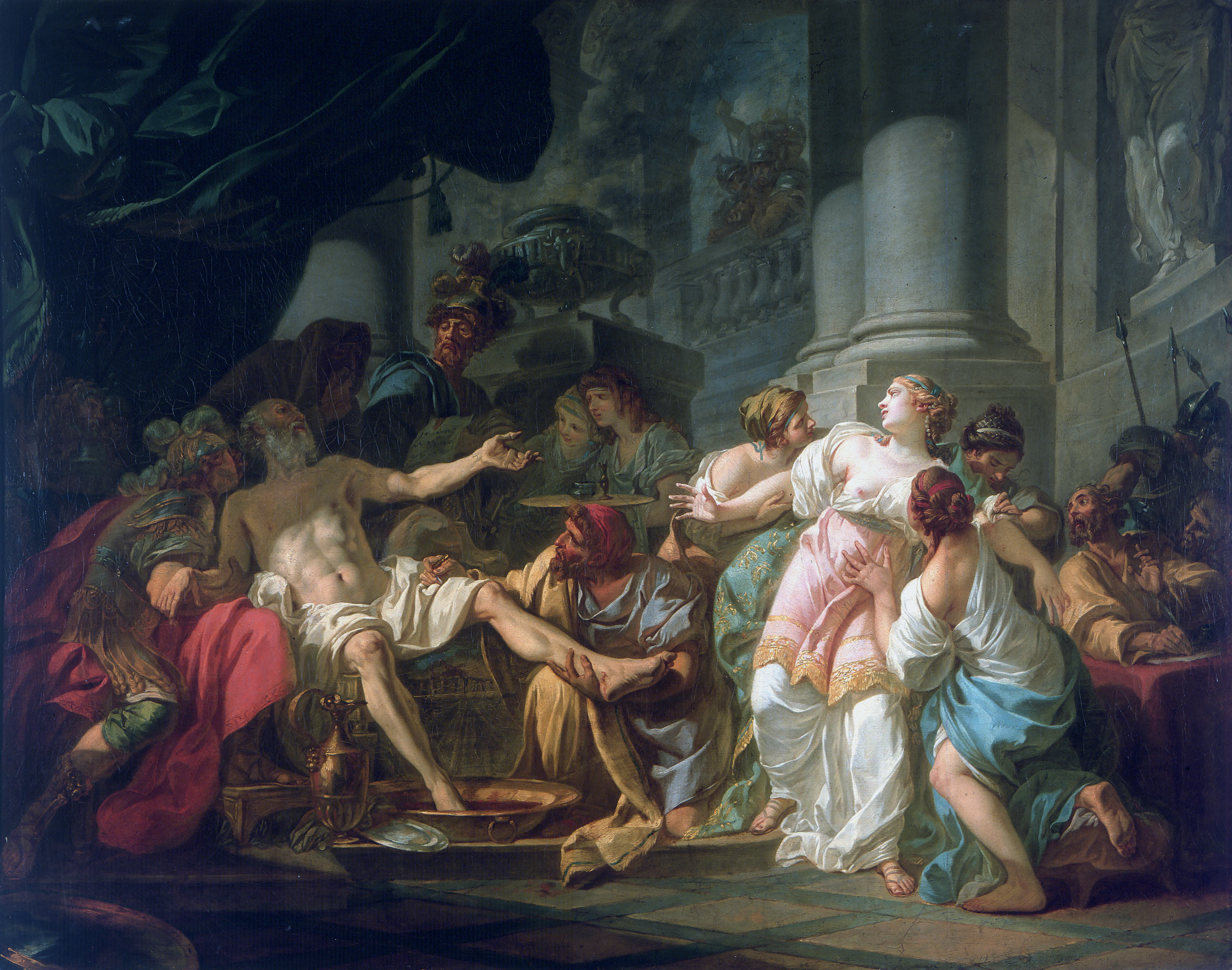
Seneca and Paulina in David's La Mort de Sénèque (1773)

=== Painting ===
Paulina has often been depicted alongside her husband in paintings of his suicide especially in French art. This includes Noël Hallé's La Mort de Sénèque of 1750. In 1773 the Académie Royale used Seneca's death as the theme for its Grand Prix. First prize went to Pierre Peyron, but his painting has been lost although drawings survive. Jacques-Louis David's La Mort de Sénèque was also exhibited. Both paintings featured Paulina prominently, especially David's. Jean-Joseph Taillasson's 1791 painting Pauline, femme de Sénèque, rappelée à la vie is unique in focusing on Paulina to the exclusion of Seneca. It depicts a Roman soldier entering the room, and ordering her bleeding to be stopped.

=== Literature ===
Pompeia Paulina is one of the 106 famous women described by Giovanni Boccaccio in his De mulieribus claris as biography 94. Similarly she was one of three Roman women eulogised by Michel de Montaigne in his Essais 2.35 "De trois bonne femmes":

To which Paulina, having a little recovered her spirits, and warmed the magnanimity of her courage with a most generous affection, replied—"No, Seneca,” said she, “I am not a woman to suffer you to go alone in such a necessity: I will not have you think that the virtuous examples of your life have not taught me how to die; and when can I ever better or more fittingly do it, or more to my own desire, than with you? and therefore assure yourself I will go along with you."

— Montaigne, Essais 2.35.
