= De Vita Beata =

Essay by Seneca

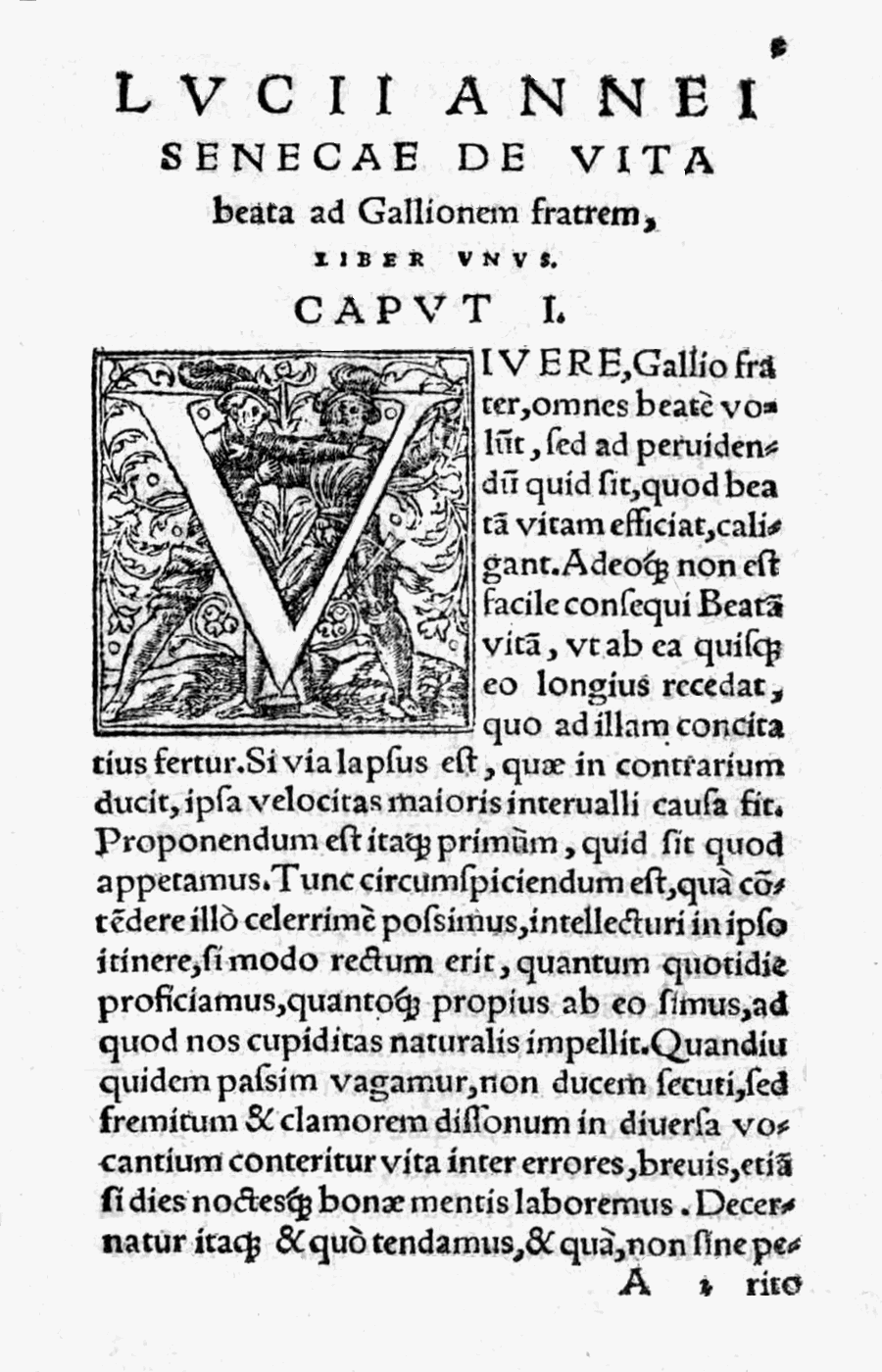
- From the 1543 edition, published by Antonio Constantino
- Author: Lucius Annaeus Seneca
- Language: Latin
- Subject: Ethics
- Genre: Philosophy
- Publication date: AD c. 58
- Publication place: Ancient Rome

De Vita Beata ("On the Happy Life") is a dialogue written by Seneca the Younger around the year 58 AD. It was intended for his older brother Gallio, to whom Seneca also dedicated his dialogue entitled De Ira ("On Anger"). It is divided into 28 chapters that present the moral thoughts of Seneca at their most mature. Seneca explains that the pursuit of happiness is the pursuit of reason – reason meant not only using logic, but also understanding the processes of nature.

== Background ==
The dialogue has the full title ad Gallionem de Vita Beata ("To Gallio on the happy life"). It was probably written in early 58 or a little earlier. From incidental remarks made in the work, it is thought Seneca wrote it when he was in a position of power near the beginning of Nero's reign between 54 and 59. Furthermore, Tacitus tells us that Publius Suillius Rufus had made a series of public attacks concerning Seneca's wealth in 58, and De Vita Beata contains a defense of wealth which may be a response to this or similar criticisms made around this time.

The work ends rather abruptly and is followed in the manuscripts by Seneca's De Otio which is missing its beginning. The earliest surviving manuscript is from the Codex Ambrosianus, a Milan Codex, from the 11th century and other copies are derived from this archetype.

== Contents ==
The work can be clearly divided into two parts. In the first part (§1–17) Seneca defines the concept of the happy life and discusses how it can be achieved. This part also disputes Epicurean doctrines. In the second part (§17–28) Seneca discusses the relationship of philosophical teachings with one's personal life. Part of this (§21–24) is specifically devoted to answering objections against the possession of wealth.

== Topics ==
Seneca, in agreement with Stoic doctrine, argues that Nature is Reason (logos) and that people must use their powers of reason to live in harmony with nature and thus achieve happiness. In his words, "rerum naturae adsentior; ab illa non deerrare et ad illius legem exemplumque formari sapientia est," which means "I follow nature; it is common sense not to stray from it but to be molded according to its law and example." Seneca proposes to follow a logical sequence in this approach, starting with the definition of the objectives that the person wants to obtain. In decision-making he scorns the ways of the masses ("the most beaten and frequented paths are the most deceptive") since people are "more willing to trust another than to judge for themselves" and "a mistake that has been passed on from hand to hand finally involves us and works our destruction."

In a certain sense he identifies Nature with God, which he states several times requires our obedience ("We were born into this kingdom and to obey to God is freedom", and he writes "when you rage against heaven I do not say, 'You are committing sacrilege,' but 'You are wasting your time.'"

Seneca presents a morality based on contempt for the pleasures ("pleasure is something lowly, servile, weak, and perishable") and fortune ("do not be corrupted by external things, be unconquerable and admire only oneself, be courageous in spirit and ready for any fate, be the moulder of one's own life"). But he admits that there are acceptable pleasures "calm, moderate, almost listless and subdued, and scarcely noticeable" linked to the conduct of the wise person.

The attainment of happiness, therefore, is only really possible by following Virtue who "like a good soldier will submit to wounds, count her scars, and, pierced by darts as she dies, will yet adore the general for whom she falls", because "no one can live cheerfully without living honourably." Thus, Seneca distinguishes between virtues hard or difficult and virtues soft or easier to practice, because "there is no virtue without effort". Among the difficult are patience, fortitude and perseverance, and among the easy are liberality, temperance and meekness.

As far as wealth is concerned, Seneca does not consider it good or bad in itself, but acknowledges that it is "useful and brings great comfort to life", so the wise person prefers them but is not subordinate to them. In this sense, wealth must be an instrument of virtue, using it to give to others, because "I shall proffer my bounty to some, and shall forcibly thrust it upon others".
