= Tranquillity =

Quality or state of being calm, serene, and worry-free

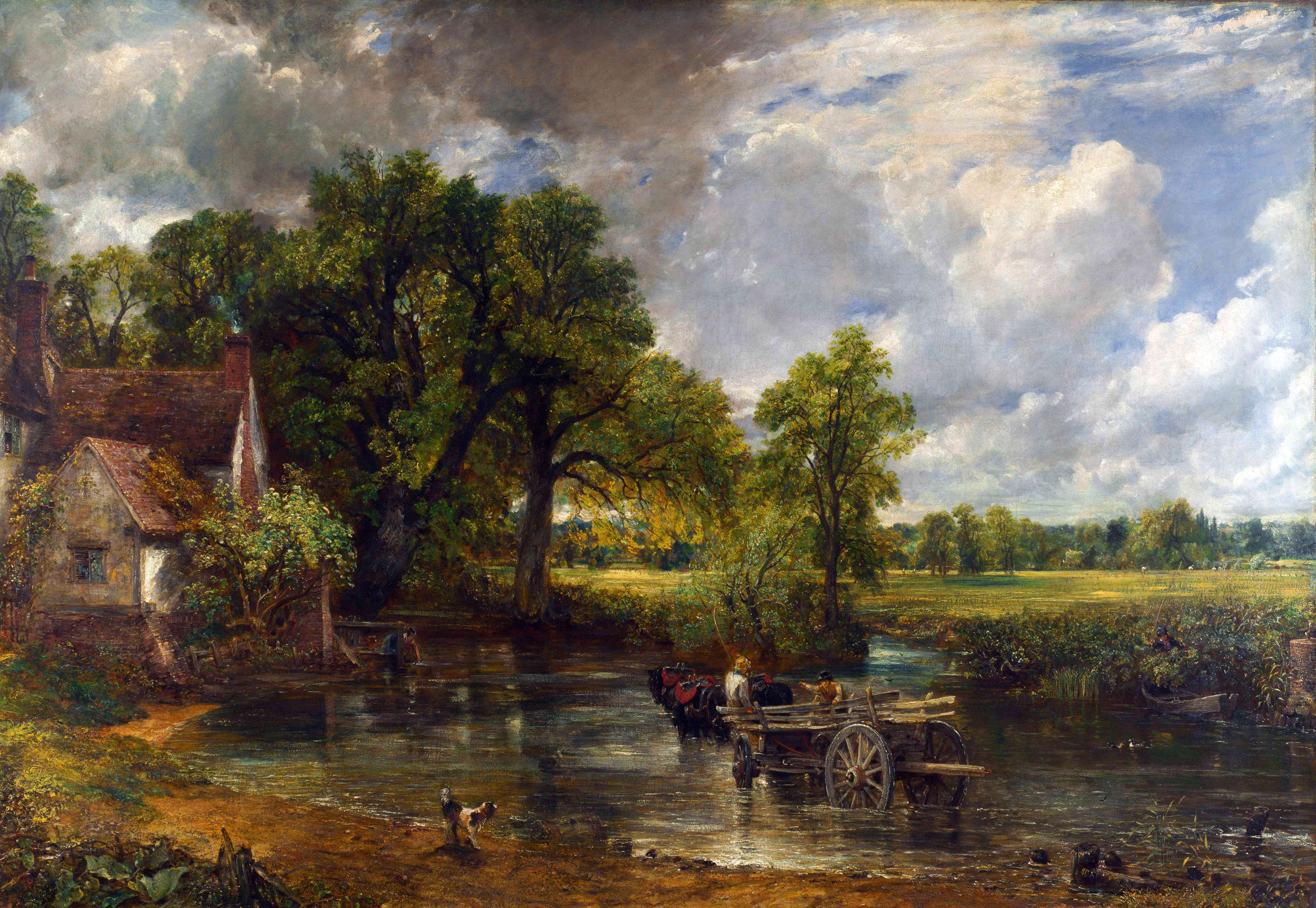
The Hay Wain by John Constable (1821)

Tranquillity (also spelled tranquility) is the quality or state of being tranquil; that is, calm, serene, and worry-free. The word tranquillity appears in numerous texts ranging from the religious writings of Buddhism—where the term passaddhi refers to tranquillity of the body, thoughts, and consciousness on the path to enlightenment—to an assortment of policy and planning guidance documents, where interpretation of the word is typically linked to engagement with the natural environment. It is also famously used in the Preamble to the United States Constitution, which describes one of the purposes for which the document was establishing the government as to "insure domestic Tranquility".

== History ==
The word tranquility dates to the 12th century in the Old French word tranquilite, meaning "peace" or "happiness". The word's sense evolved in the late 14th century, but it maintains its reference to the absence of disturbance and peacefulness.

== Benefits ==
Being in a tranquil or "restorative" environment allows people to take respite from the periods of sustained "directed attention" that characterise modern living. In developing their Attention Restoration Theory (ART), Kaplan and Kaplan proposed that people could most effectively recover from cognitive overload by engaging with natural restorative environments, those that are away from daily distractions and that have the extent and mystery that allows the imagination to wander, thereby enabling people to engage effortlessly with their surroundings. According to the theory, the amount of reflection possible within such an environment depends upon the type of cognitive engagement (fascination) that the environment holds. "Soft fascination" is deemed to occur when there is enough interest in the surroundings to hold attention but not so much that it compromises the ability to reflect. It provides a pleasing level of sensory input that involves no cognitive effort other than removing oneself from an overcrowded mental space.

=== Enjoyment ===
For many, the chance to experience tranquillity is an advantage of the countryside over cities. In a survey by the United Kingdom Department for Environment, Food and Rural Affairs (DEFRA) 58% of people said that tranquillity was the most positive feature of the countryside.

=== Health ===
In contrast to "soft fascination", "directed attention" requires a significant amount of cognitive effort. Prolonged periods of sustained mental activity can lead to directed attention fatigue. This can affect performance and bring about negative emotions, irritability, and decreased sensitivity to interpersonal cues. As the incidence of mental illness continues to rise, there is growing evidence that exposure to natural environments can contribute to health and wellbeing. Exposure to nature contributes to physical and psychological wellbeing. One review found evidence of "nature-deficit-disorder" in children, which suggests that the importance of being able to engage with restorative environments applies across a wide age range. Natural tranquil surroundings affect the psychology of people suffering from stress. For example, one study found that stress (as measured by blood pressure, muscle tension, and skin conductance response), induced by showing videos of workplace injuries, improved significantly more quickly if further videos viewed included natural surroundings rather than busy traffic or shopping scenes. Another study demonstrated the benefits of simulating such environments for pain relief during bone marrow aspirate and biopsy.

=== Economic ===
The presence of tranquil areas helps boost rural tourism. Rural tourism in the U.K. supports 380,000 jobs and contributes £13.8 billion annually to the rural economy, and one survey showed that tranquillity is the main reason why 49% of visitors are attracted to the countryside.

== Research ==
Natural settings that effortlessly engage our attention are associated with soft fascination and with the analysis of tranquillity discussed above. One study attempted to distinguish empirically between the constructs of tranquillity and preference as affective qualities of natural environments. Motivated by ART, from which they took tranquillity as a reasonable term to describe soft fascination, they produced definitions for each component. Tranquillity they defined as "how much you think this setting is a quiet, peaceful place, a good place to get away from everyday life", and preference as "how much you like this setting for whatever reason". Subjects were asked to score the following visual settings: mountains, deserts, fields / forests, and waterscapes against those two target variables (tranquillity and preference) and four descriptor variables: mistiness, unstructured openness, focus, and surface calmness. Tranquillity and preference were positively correlated across all settings with tranquillity scoring higher ratings in the field / forest, waterscape, and mountain categories, whilst rushing water had the highest rating in the preference category.

Analysis of the results identified three physical features that help explain the apparent split between tranquillity and preference: mistiness, unstructured openness (how open the scene is and how difficult it is to establish a sense of depth or distance), and surface calmness. Mistiness and unstructured openness tended to depress preference relative to tranquillity whilst surface calmness tended to enhance it. A follow-up study included deserts and waterscapes in the setting types.

Another study investigated the relationship between tranquillity and danger in urban and rural settings. The key results were 1) that "setting care", which relates to how safe we feel in a particular setting, is more salient for judgments of danger in urban settings than natural ones, and 2) that openness was a significant predictor of danger but not of tranquillity. The authors concluded that tranquillity and danger should not be viewed as polar opposites, but, like preference and tranquillity, as distinct constructs.

=== The role of audio-visual interaction within the tranquillity construct ===
Within tranquillity studies, much of the emphasis has been placed on understanding the role of vision in the perception of natural environments. People can very quickly form an impression of a landscape upon viewing it. The speed with which people process complex natural images was tested by using colour photographs of a wide range of animals (mammals, birds, reptiles, and fish) in their natural environments, mixed with distracters that included pictures of forests, mountains, lakes, buildings, and fruit. During this experiment, subjects were shown an image for 20ms and asked to determine whether it contained an animal or not. The electrophysiological brain responses obtained in this study showed that a decision could be made within 150ms of the image being seen, indicating the speed at which cognitive visual processing occurs.

Audition, and the components that comprise the soundscape (a term coined by Schafer to describe the array of sounds that constitute the sonic environment) also inform the ways people characterise landscapes. Auditory reaction times are 50 to 60ms faster than visual ones. Sound can also alter visual perception, and under certain conditions areas of the brain involved in processing auditory information can be activated in response to visual stimuli.

When individuals make tranquillity assessments based on a uni-modal auditory or visual sensory input, they characterise the environment by drawing upon a number of key landscape and soundscape characteristics. For example, when making assessments in response to visual-only stimuli the percentage of water, flora, and geological features positively influence how tranquil a location is perceived to be. Likewise when responding to uni-modal auditory stimuli, the perceived loudness of biological sounds positively influences the perception of tranquillity, whilst the perceived loudness of mechanical sounds have a negative effect. However, when presented with bi-modal auditory-visual stimuli the individual soundscape and landscape components alone no longer influence the perception of tranquillity. Rather configurational coherence was provided by the percentage of natural and contextual features present within the scene and the equivalent continuous sound pressure level (LAeq).

=== Predicting tranquillity ===
Researchers at the Bradford Centre for Sustainable Environments developed a methodology with which the perceived tranquillity rating (TR) of an amenity area such as park, green, or urban square can be measured, on a 0–10 scale. The method involves assessing average daytime noise levels Lday (usually traffic noise) and measuring the percentage of natural and contextual features (NCF) contained within the visual scene. The latter includes the percentage area in the visual scene occupied by natural features in the landscape such as vegetation, water, and geological features (for example, exposure of rock), and contextual features such as listed buildings, religious and historic buildings, landmarks, monuments, and elements of the landscape such as traditional farm buildings that directly contribute to the visual context of the natural environment. Lastly, moderating factors (MF) also occur that can influence the perception of tranquillity. The moderating factors are not large; because they are relatively difficult to quantify they are the subject of ongoing research. The TR of an area is then a function of noise, NCF, and MF.

One potentially effective solution to improving tranquillity is to mask traffic noise or distract attention from it with an attractive water sound. Water-generated sounds may improve the perceived tranquillity of gardens blighted by noise. Litter can degrade an environment such that the tranquillity rating drops on average by one scale point.

A study using fMRI neuro-imaging techniques demonstrated the significant differences in effective connectivity between areas of the brain, namely the auditory cortex and the medial pre-frontal cortex, under tranquil and non-tranquil conditions. Specifically the medial pre-frontal cortex receives significantly enhanced contributions from the auditory cortex when presented with a more tranquil visual scene.

=== Mapping tranquillity ===
2007 Tranquillity map of England. Green areas denote very tranquil areas, whereas red areas denote areas with much less tranquillity.

The first method of mapping tranquillity was developed by Simon Rendel of ASH Consulting for a Department for Transport study in 1991. This led to the production of a set of Tranquil Area maps covering England, produced by Rendel and ASH Consulting and published by the Campaign to Protect Rural England (CPRE) and the former Countryside Commission.

In these maps tranquil areas were defined as "places sufficiently far from the visual or noise intrusion of development or traffic to be considered unspoilt by urban influences".

More sophisticated mapping techniques are now available following work by researchers at Northumbria University, Newcastle University, and CPRE.

Maps have been produced for the whole of England that show the tranquillity score of Ordnance Survey Grid-derived 500m×500m squares. The tranquillity rating for each is based on 44 factors that add to or detract from people’s feelings of tranquillity. These factors were defined following extensive public consultations.

The methodology examines the diffusion of the impact of these factors over distance, taking into account the terrain of the land. For example, the tranquillity increases gradually the further one is from a busy road, but increases more sharply if the road is hidden in a cutting.

This cartographic study showed that tranquillity is not the absence of all noise, activity, and buildings. Indeed, it found that many rural activities, such as farming and hiking, and natural noises such as birdsong and cows lowing, enhance people’s experience of tranquillity.

==== Some factors with positive impacts on tranquillity ====
- a natural landscape, including woodland
- presence of rivers, streams, lakes or the sea
- birds and other wildlife
- wide open spaces
- clear open night sky with/without moon
- beach in a unique location
- open field, flora etc. with gentle to moderate wind flow

==== Some factors with negative impacts on tranquillity ====
- Motorised transport: cars, motorcycle, trains and aircraft – and roads and railways
- light pollution
- large numbers of people
- pylons, power lines, masts and wind turbines
- noise

== See also ==
- Ataraxia
- Euthymia (philosophy)
- Hesychia
- Inner peace
- Passaddhi
- Upeksa
