= De Clementia =

Essay by Seneca

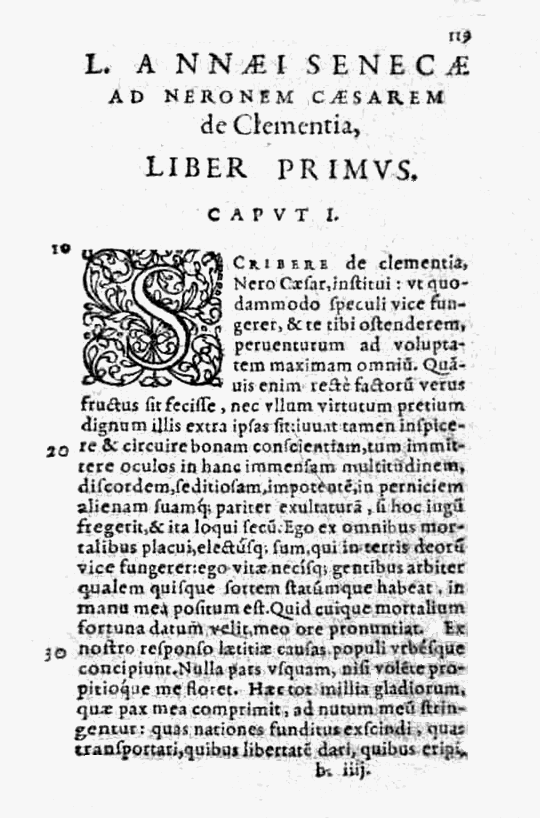
- From the 1594 edition, published by Jean Le Preux
- Author: Lucius Annaeus Seneca
- Language: Latin
- Subject: Ethics
- Genre: Philosophy
- Publication date: AD c. 55
- Publication place: Ancient Rome

De Clementia (frequently translated as On Mercy in English) is a two volume (incomplete) hortatory essay written in AD 55–56 by Seneca the Younger, a Roman Stoic philosopher, to the emperor Nero in the first five years of his reign.

== Date and writing ==
The work was written after Nero had become emperor and clearly dates from an early part of Nero's reign. From Seneca's remarks, it would appear that it was written after Nero had turned eighteen, which would place it after the murder of his rival Britannicus in AD 55. It may therefore have been written partly as an apology, perhaps as a means of assuring the Roman nobility that the murder would be the end, not the beginning of bloodshed.

The work survives in a fragmentary state. Of an original three books, only the first and the beginning of the second survive.

== The essay ==
Seneca's De Clementia is an instructional contrast between the good ruler and the tyrant, and an evaluation of the relationship between ruler and subject. A survey of history is made in the first volume to select different rulers to point out as examples, including Dionysius of Syracuse and Sulla being used as cautionary tales and young Augustus as the exemplar. An extended illustration of Augustus showing mercy to the rebellious Cinna alongside an example from Nero's own life is meant to encourage the aspiring emperor to likewise show clemency.

While the first volume is accommodated to popular understanding the second book touches on stoic paradoxes and scholastic details. In general, the two books are not overly concerned with historical accuracy.

Within his essay, Seneca does not discuss the constitutional legitimacy of the principate, but rather deals with the problem of having a good sovereign. The only real power, in his view, was power which was guided by the Stoic conception of logos (universal reason). Thus, clemency, not pity or unmotivated generosity, is the reasonable approach which guarantees the consent and devotion of the emperor's subjects and provides the state's security.

== Legacy ==
De Clementia is a rare survival of a Roman work dedicated to political advice. It is particularly unusual in its discussion of mercy, as later panegyrics tend to emphasise imperial piety and majesty.

The text has come down to us together with De Beneficiis in one of the earliest surviving Senecan manuscripts, as part of the 8th century Codex Nazarianus (Vat. Pal. 1547). In the 12th century copies of De Clementia were circulating Europe nearly always attached to De Beneficiis, and in this form it reached the Renaissance. Although always regarded as a minor work of Seneca's, it received one significant appraisal in 1532 when John Calvin published his commentary on it.

== John Calvin's commentary on De Clementia ==
Shortly after finishing his legal studies, a young John Calvin wrote his first book, a commentary on De Clementia. The commentary consists mostly of philological notes and context with other Latin writers interspersed with notes on Seneca's style and ideas. There have been three suggested reasons for this. First, Erasmus wrote the preface to his 1529 translation of Seneca that he welcomed editorial comments by young scholars. In taking up this invitation, some believe Calvin was attempting to establish his reputation as a humanist among the intellectual elite. Second, because there was a general revival of Stoicism in Renaissance times, it may have been simply because Calvin wanted more popularity for Seneca. Theodore Beza, who was Calvin's successor in Geneva, mentions Seneca as "a great favorite for him" because he was "obviously in accord with Calvin." The third possibility, generally rejected by scholars, is that he was writing to the French King Francis I. The lack of a dedication to him, mention of him, and gross error that would have been made comparing Francis with Nero all lead to the theory's disuse.

In writing his Commentary, Calvin made use of the texts of two "ancient pillars," Cicero and Seneca, and two "modern pillars," Erasmus and Budaeus. Ford Lewis Battles argues there is a third "modern pillar," Philipus Beroaldus the Elder. When quoting from sources, he is less versed in Greek literature than in Latin. Calvin's brief biographical sketch of Seneca at the outset is taken almost entirely from Tacitus, while ignoring the less noble picture from Dio Cassius.

Fundamentally, Calvin at this point in his career is acting as a humanist and not a Protestant reformer. Calvin and Seneca agree that all men are sinners and sin needs to be punished, and both are committed to a deterministic theism. However, it becomes clear that Calvin had not intended to pass Stoic elements into Protestant theology, and in fact Calvin attacks the Stoic creed more often than he approves it. Beyond theological critique, Calvin also reproves Seneca's style as too luxuriant, and remarks, "I also miss the orderly arrangement of matter, which is certainly not the least quality of a good style." We can already begin to see the anticipation of Calvin's full development in his writing method and can expect the transformation of Calvin's classical learning and the seriousness of the Stoic ethic into Christian faith.

== Quotations ==
The true enjoyment of good deeds consists in the performance of them, and virtues have no adequate reward beyond themselves.

There is a large part of mankind which might return to virtue if the hope of pardon were not denied them.

Clemency becomes no one more than a king or a prince; for great power is glorious and admirable only when it is beneficent.

Clemency is what makes the great distinction between kings and tyrants.

No creature is more fretful, or to be treated with greater skill, than man, and none should be treated with greater forbearance.
