= De Constantia Sapientis =

Essay by Seneca

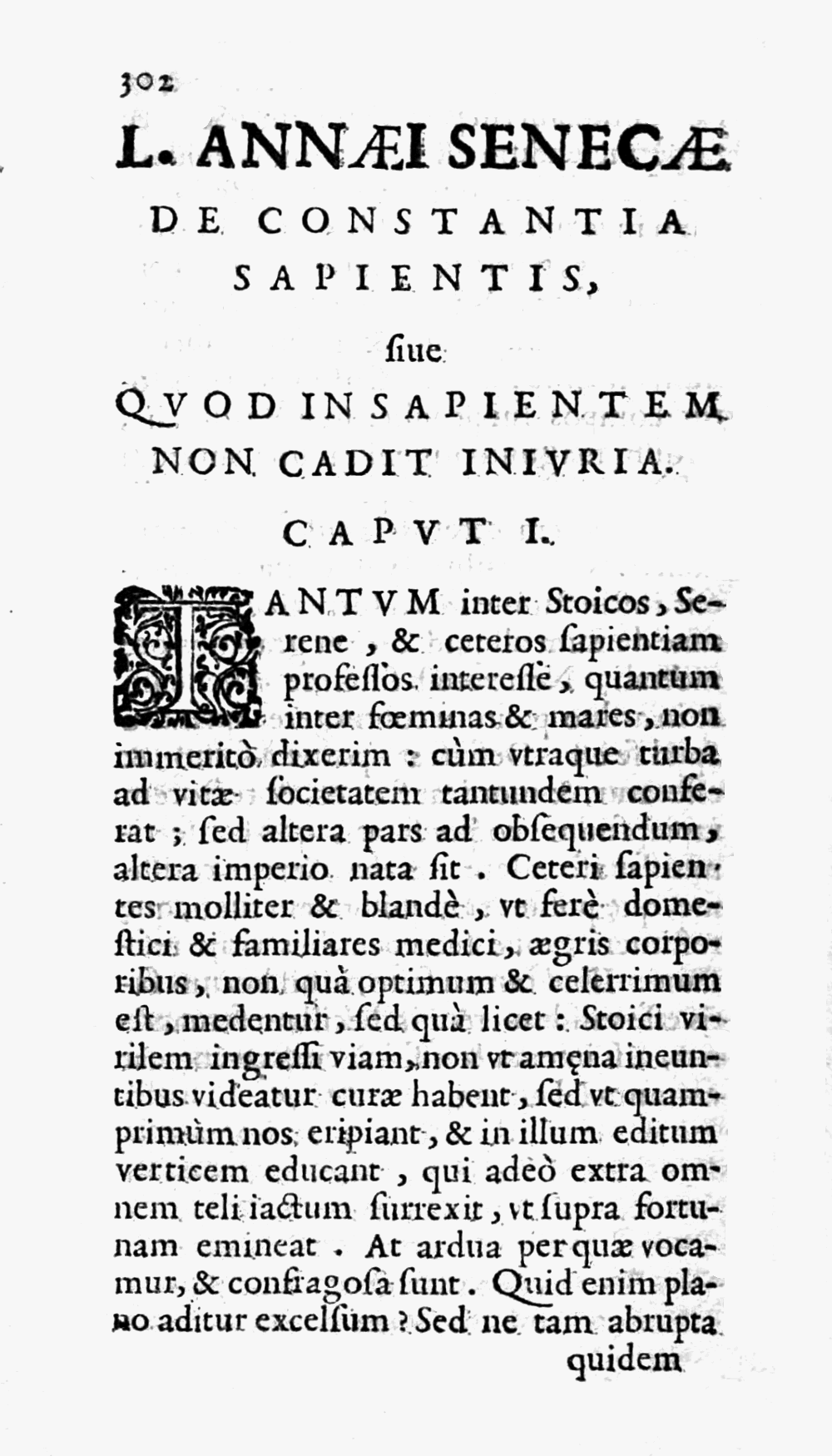
- From the 1643 edition, published by Francesco Baba
- Author: Lucius Annaeus Seneca
- Language: Latin
- Subject: Ethics
- Genre: Philosophy
- Publication date: AD c. 55
- Publication place: Ancient Rome

De Constantia Sapientis (transl. On the Firmness of the Wise) is a moral essay written by Seneca the Younger, a Roman Stoic philosopher, sometime around 55 AD. The work celebrates the imperturbability of the ideal Stoic sage, who with an inner firmness, is strengthened by injury and adversity.

== Date and addressee ==
The work is addressed to Seneca's friend Annaeus Serenus and written sometime between 47 and 62.

De Constantia Sapientis is one of a trio of dialogues addressed to Serenus, which also includes De Tranquillitate Animi and De Otio. The superior position the sage inhabits, of detachment from earthly future events of a detrimental nature, is the unifying theme of the dialogues. Since Serenus is portrayed as not yet a Stoic in De Constantia Sapientis, it is usually considered the earliest of the three dialogues.

== Content ==
In De Constantia Sapientis Seneca argues that Stoicism is not as harsh as it first appears. Recalling the figure of Cato the Younger Seneca argues that Cato as a wise person suffered neither injury nor insult. Although Serenus objects to this paradox, Seneca provides further analogies to emphasize the impervious nature of the wise person. In chapter 5 Seneca distinguishes between contumelia (insults) and iniuria (injuries). The rest of the treatise through to chapter 19 consists of discussions on the nature of both themes, showing that the wise person is immune from both insults and injuries. Seneca concludes the treatise praising the idea of the wise person while offering practical advice for all of us who are imperfect.
