= De Otio =

Essay by Seneca

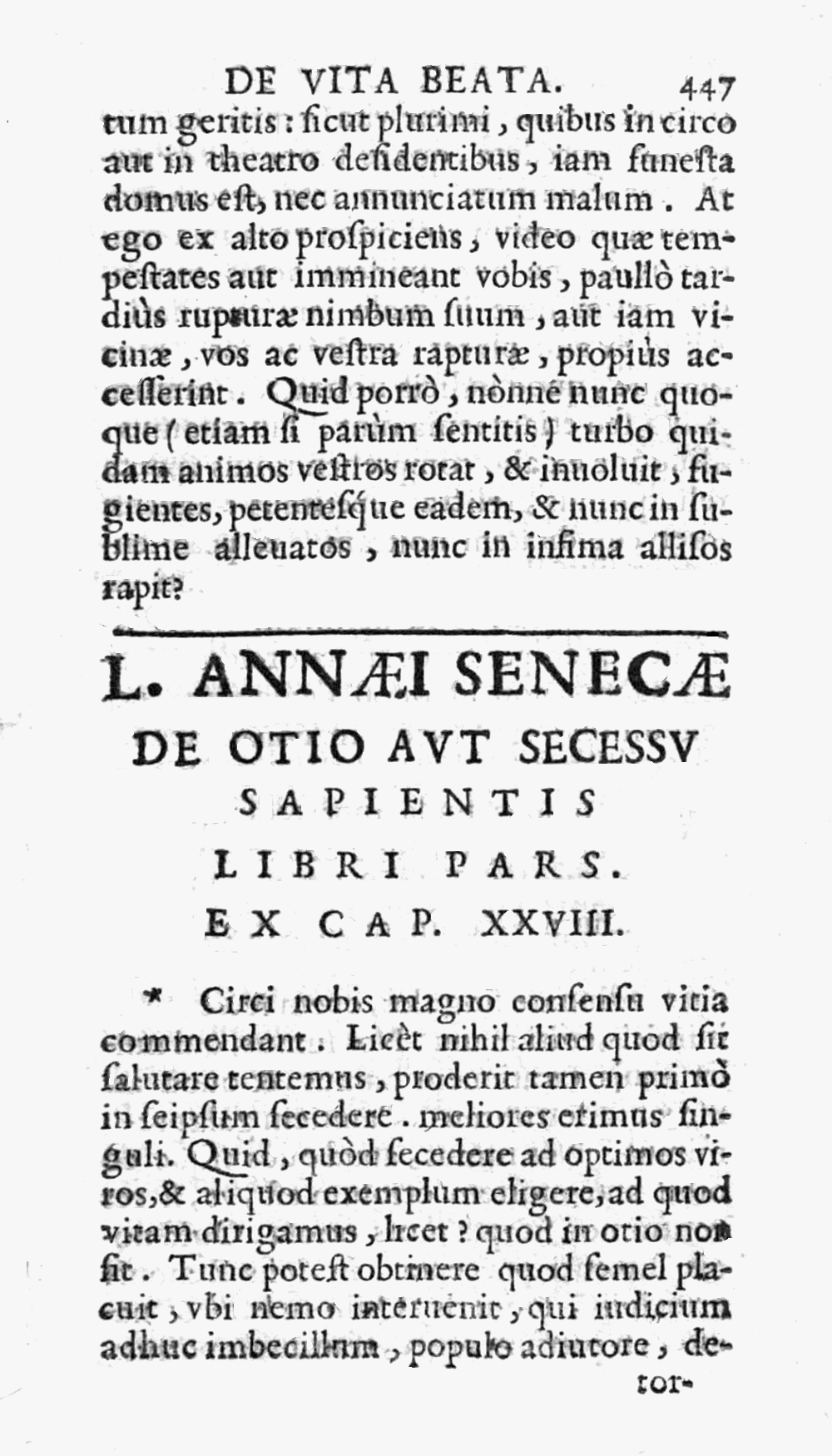
- From the 1643 edition, published by Francesco Baba. Its position, appended to the end of De Vita Beata, reflects the manuscript tradition
- Author: Lucius Annaeus Seneca
- Language: Latin
- Subject: Ethics
- Genre: Philosophy
- Publication date: AD c. 62
- Publication place: Ancient Rome

De Otio (On Leisure) is a 1st-century Latin work by Seneca (4 BC–65 AD). It survives in a fragmentary state. The work concerns the rational use of spare time, whereby one can still actively aid humankind by engaging in wider questions about nature and the universe.

== Dating ==
No absolute certainty about the date of writing is possible, but since the contents of the work parallel Seneca's own withdrawal into private life near the end of his life it is thought by a majority of critics to have been written around 62 AD or shortly after.

== Title and contents ==
Otio is from otium, this literally translates as leisure, vacant time, freedom from business.

De Otio survives only in fragmentary form. The manuscript text begins mid-sentence, and ends rather abruptly. In the Codex Ambrosianus C 90 (the main source for Seneca's essays) it is simply tacked onto the end of De Vita Beata suggesting a scribe missed a page or two. The title of the essay, De Otio, is known from the table of contents. The addressee has been erased but appears to have been seven letters long and is assumed to have been Seneca's friend Serenus. De Otio is thus one of a trio of dialogues addressed to Serenus, which also includes De Constantia Sapientis and De Tranquillitate Animi. Chronologically, it is thought to be the last of the three.

== Themes ==
Seneca understood the word otio to represent something more than absolute free-time. He understood it to mean leisure used in service to the community by intellectual activity:

... hoc nempe ab homine exigitur, ut prosit hominibus

... this of course is required of a human, to benefit their fellow humans

In De Otio Seneca debates the appropriate life for a Stoic philosopher. Seneca reports the standard position of the school that wise people will engage in public affairs, unless something prevents them. Seneca lists some arguments against engaging in public life such as if the state is too corrupt, or if the wise person's influence is too limited, or if they are ill. Seneca then shows that private life (otium) far from being a life of listless retirement can be active from a Stoic point of view. The wise person can choose to engage with the wider universe: by moving one's actions from the local to the cosmic perspective and engage with the fundamental questions of the universe, one can still aid all of humankind.

The superior position the sage (ho sophos) inhabits of detachment from earthly (terena) concerns, and an according freedom from possible future events of detrimental nature, is a unifying theme of the dialogue.
