= List of Latin phrases (H) =

This page is one of a series listing English translations of notable Latin phrases, such as veni, vidi, vici and et cetera. Some of the phrases are themselves translations of Greek phrases, as ancient Greek rhetoric and literature started centuries before the beginning of Latin literature in ancient Rome.

Latin	Translation	Notes
habeas corpus	[we command] that you have the body [brought up]	A legal term from the 14th century or earlier. Refers to a number of legal writs requiring a jailer to bring a prisoner in person (hence corpus) before a court or judge, most commonly habeas corpus ad subjiciendum ("that you have the body [brought up] for the purpose of subjecting [the case to examination]"). Commonly used as the general term for a prisoner's legal right to challenge the legality of their detention.
habemus papam	we have a pope	Used after a Catholic Church papal election to announce publicly a successful ballot to elect a new pope.
habent sua fata libelli	Books have their destiny [according to the capabilities of the reader]	Terentianus Maurus, De litteris, de syllabis, de metris, 1:1286.
hac lege	with this law	
haec olim meminisse iuvabit	one day, this will be pleasing to remember	Commonly rendered in English as "One day, we'll look back on this and smile". From Virgil's Aeneid 1.203. Also, motto of Handsworth Grammar School, and the Jefferson Society.
haec ornamenta mea [sunt]	"These are my ornaments" or "These are my jewels"	Attributed to Cornelia Africana (talking about her children) by Valerius Maximus in Factorum ac dictorum memorabilium libri IX, IV, 4, incipit.
Hannibal ad portas	Hannibal at the gates	Found in Cicero's first Philippic and in Livy's Ab urbe condita Hannibal was a fierce enemy of Rome who almost brought them to defeat. Sometimes rendered "Hannibal ante portas", with similar meaning: "Hannibal before the gates"
haud ignota loquor	I speak not of unknown things	Thus, "I say no things that are unknown". From Virgil's Aeneid, 2.91.
Hei mihi! quod nullis amor est medicabilis herbis.	Oh me! love can not be cured by herbs	From Ovid's Metamorphoses, I, 523.
hic abundant leones	here lions abound	Written on uncharted territories of old maps; see also: here be dragons.
hic et nunc	here and now	The imperative motto for the satisfaction of desire. "I need it, Here and Now"
hic et ubique	here and everywhere	
hic jacet (HJ)	here lies	Also rendered hic iacet. Written on gravestones or tombs, preceding the name of the deceased. Equivalent to hic sepultus (here is buried), and sometimes combined into hic jacet sepultus (HJS), "here lies buried".
hic locus est ubi mors gaudet succurrere vitae	This is the place where death delights in helping life	A motto of many morgues or wards of anatomical pathology.
hic manebimus optime	here we will remain most excellently	According to Titus Livius the phrase was pronounced by Marcus Furius Camillus, addressing the senators who intended to abandon the city, invaded by Gauls, circa 390 BC. It is used today to express the intent to keep one's position, even if the circumstances appear adverse.
hic mortui vivunt et muti loquuntur	here the dead live and the mute speak	inscription on several libraries
hic Rhodus, hic salta	Here is Rhodes, jump here	From the Latin version of "The Boastful Athlete" in Aesop's Fables as formulated by Erasmus in his Adagia. An athlete brags about his impressive jump at a past event in Rhodes, whereupon he is challenged to reproduce it then and there, not merely boast. In other words, prove what you can do, here and now. Cited by Hegel and Marx.
hic sunt dracones	here there are dragons	Written on a globe engraved on two conjoined halves of ostrich eggs, dated to 1504.
hic sunt leones	here there are lions	Written on uncharted territories of old maps.
hinc et inde	from both sides	
hinc illae lacrimae	hence those tears	From Terence, Andria, act 1, line 126. Originally literal, referring to the tears shed by Pamphilus at the funeral of Chrysis, it came to be used proverbially in the works of later authors, such as Horace (Epistulae 1.XIX:41).
hinc itur ad astra	from here the way leads to the stars	Written on the wall of the old astronomical observatory of Vilnius University, Lithuania, and the university's motto.
hinc robur et securitas	herefore strength and safety	Motto of the Central Bank of Sweden.
historia vitae magistra	history, the teacher of life	From Cicero's De Oratore, II, 9. Also "history is the mistress of life".
hoc age	do this	Motto of Bradford Grammar School
hoc est bellum	This is war	
hoc est Christum cognoscere, beneficia eius cognoscere	To know Christ is to know his benefits	Famous dictum by the Reformer Melanchthon in his Loci Communes of 1521
hoc est enim corpus meum	For this is my Body	The words of Jesus reiterated in Latin during the Roman Catholic Eucharist. Sometimes simply written as Hoc est corpus meum or "This is my body".
hoc genus omne	All that crowd/people	From Horace's Satires, 1/2:2. Refers to the crowd at Tigellio's funeral (c. 40–39 BC). Not to be confused with et hoc genus omne (English: and all that sort of thing).
hodie mihi, cras tibi	Today for me, tomorrow for you	Inscription that can be seen on tombstones dating from the Middle Ages, meant to outline the ephemerality of life.
hominem pagina nostra sapit	It is of man that my page smells	From Martial's Epigrams, Book 10, No. 4, Line 10; stating his purpose in writing.
hominem non morbum cura	Treat the man, not the disease	Motto of the Far Eastern University – Institute of Nursing
homo bulla	man is a bubble	Varro (116 BC – 27 BC), in the opening line of the first book of Rerum Rusticarum Libri Tres, wrote quod, ut dicitur, si est homo bulla, eo magis senex (for if, as they say, man is a bubble, all the more so is an old man) later reintroduced by Erasmus in his Adagia, a collection of sayings published in 1572.
homo homini lupus	man [is a] wolf to man	First attested in Plautus' Asinaria (lupus est homo homini). The sentence was drawn on by Thomas Hobbes in De Cive as a concise expression of his views on human nature.
Homo minister et interpres naturae	Man, the servant and interpreter of nature	Motto of the Lehigh University
homo praesumitur bonus donec probetur malus	One is innocent until proven guilty	See also: presumption of innocence.
homo sine pecunia imago mortis	a man without money is the image of death	
Homo sum, humani nihil a me alienum puto	I am a human being; I think that nothing human is strange to me	From Terence's Heauton Timorumenos (The Self-Tormentor) (163 BC). Originally "strange" or "foreign" (alienum) was used in the sense of "irrelevant", as this line was a response to the speaker being told to mind his own business, but it is now commonly used to advocate respecting different cultures and being humane in general.
homo unius libri	a man of a single book	Attributed to Thomas Aquinas: «Hominem unius libri timeo» “I fear a man of a single book.”
honestas ante honores	honesty before glory	Motto of King George V School, Hong Kong
honor et virtus post morte floret	honesty and virtue flourish after death	inscribed in the stonework in Paolo Veronese's (1565 c.) Painting Allegory of Virtue and Vice
honor virtutis praemium	esteem is the reward of virtue	Motto of Arnold School, Blackpool, England
honoris causa	for the sake of honor	Said of an honorary title, such as "Doctor of Science honoris causa"
hora fugit	the hour flees	See tempus fugit
hora somni (h.s.)	at the hour of sleep	Medical shorthand for "at bedtime"
horas non numero nisi serenas	I do not count the hours unless they are sunny	A common inscription on sundials.
horresco referens	I shudder as I tell	From Virgil's Aeneid, 2.204, on the appearance of the sea-serpents who kill the Trojan priest Laocoön and his sons
horribile dictu	horrible to say	cf. mirabile dictu
horror vacui	fear of the empty	phenomenon in art and hypothesis in philosophy
hortus in urbe	A garden in the city	Motto of the Chicago Park District, a playful allusion to the city's motto, urbs in horto, q.v.
hortus siccus	A dry garden	A collection of dry, preserved plants
hostis humani generis	enemy of the human race	Cicero defined pirates in Roman law as being enemies of humanity in general.
humilitas occidit superbiam	humility conquers pride	
hypotheses non fingo	I do not fabricate hypotheses	From Newton, Principia. Less literally, "I do not assert that any hypotheses are true".
