= List of Latin phrases (N) =

This page is one of a series listing English translations of notable Latin phrases, such as veni, vidi, vici and et cetera. Some of the phrases are themselves translations of Greek phrases, as ancient Greek rhetoric and literature started centuries before the beginning of Latin literature in ancient Rome.

Latin	Translation	Notes
nanos gigantum humeris insidentes	Dwarfs standing on the shoulders of giants	First recorded by John of Salisbury in the twelfth century and attributed to Bernard of Chartres. Also commonly known by the letters of Isaac Newton: "If I have seen further it is by standing on the shoulders of giants".
nascentes morimur finisque ab origine pendet	As we are born we die, and our end hangs from our beginning	
nasciturus pro iam nato habetur, quotiens de commodis eius agitur	The unborn is deemed to have been born to the extent that his own inheritance is concerned	Refers to a situation where an unborn child is deemed to be entitled to certain inheritance rights.
natura abhorret a vacuo	nature abhors vacuum	Pseudo-explanation for why a liquid will climb up a tube to fill a vacuum, often given before the discovery of atmospheric pressure.
natura artis magistra	Nature is the teacher of art	Full name of the zoo Artis in the centre of Amsterdam
natura naturans	nature acting	originally linked to Aristotle, then to his Arabic commentators
natura naturantis	nature creating, creative nature	literary motif used by Bolesław Leśmian
natura naturata	nature created	concept explored by Baruch Spinoza
natura nihil frustra facit	nature does nothing in vain	Cf. Aristotle: "οὐθὲν γάρ, ὡς φαμέν, μάτην ἡ φύσις ποιεῖ" (Politics I 2, 1253a9) and Leucippus: "Everything that happens does so for a reason and of necessity."
natura non contristatur	nature is not saddened	That is, the natural world is not sentimental or compassionate. Derived by Arthur Schopenhauer from an earlier source.
natura non facit saltum ita nec lex	nature does not make a leap, thus neither does the law	Shortened form of sicut natura nil facit per saltum ita nec lex (just as nature does nothing by a leap, so neither does the law), referring to both nature and the legal system moving gradually.
natura non facit saltus	nature makes no leaps	A famous aphorism of Carl Linnaeus stating that all organisms bear relationships on all sides, their forms changing gradually from one species to the next. From Philosophia Botanica (1751).
natura valde simplex est et sibi consona	Nature is exceedingly simple and harmonious with itself	Sir Isaac Newton's famous quote, defining foundation of all modern sciences. Can be found in his Unpublished Scientific Papers of Isaac Newton: A selection from the Portsmouth Collection in the University Library, Cambridge, 1978 edition
naturalia non sunt turpia	What is natural is not dirty	Based on Servius' commentary on Virgil's Georgics (3:96): "turpis non est quia per naturam venit."
naturam expellas furca, tamen usque recurret	You may drive out Nature with a pitchfork, yet she still will hurry back	You must take the basic nature of something into account. – Horace, Epistles, Book I, epistle X, line 24.
naturam primum cognoscere rerum	First to learn the nature of things	Motto of the Australian National University
navigare necesse est, vivere non est necesse	to sail is necessary; to live is not necessary	Attributed by Plutarch to Gnaeus Pompeius Magnus, who, during a severe storm, commanded sailors to bring food from Africa to Rome. Translated from Plutarch's Greek "πλεῖν ἀνάγκη, ζῆν οὐκ ἀνάγκη".
ne plus ultra	nothing more beyond	Also nec plus ultra or non plus ultra. A descriptive phrase meaning the most extreme point, or the best form, of something. Most notably the Pillars of Hercules were in the geographic sense the nec plus ultra of the ancient Mediterranean world, before the discovery of the Americas. Holy Roman Emperor Charles V's heraldic emblem contradicted this postulate, using an amended version of the phrase inscribed on two pillars – as plus ultra ("more (lies) beyond"), without the negation, referring to the on-going Spanish colonization of the recently discovered Americas, which lay beyond the Pillars of Hercules. Non plus ultra is the motto of the Spanish exclave of Melilla, situated on a Mediterranean cape 230 km east of the original southern Pillar of Hercules. The Boston Musical Instrument Company engraved ne plus ultra on its instruments from 1869 to 1928 to signify that none were better.
ne puero gladium	do not give a sword to a boy	Never give dangerous tools to someone who is untrained to use them or too immature to understand the damage they can do.
ne supra crepidam sutor iudicaret	a shoemaker should not judge beyond the shoe	see Sutor, ne ultra crepidam
ne te quaesiveris extra	do not seek outside yourself	line from the Roman satirist Persius inscribed on the boulder to the right of Sir John Suckling in the painting of the aforementioned subject by Sir Anthony van Dyck (ca. 1638) and invoked by Ralph Waldo Emerson at the opening of his essay Self-Reliance (1841)
Nec aspera terrent	They are not terrified of the rough things	They are not afraid of difficulties. Less literally "Difficulties be damned." Motto for 27th Infantry Regiment (United States) and the Duke of Lancaster's Regiment. Nec = not; aspera = rough ones/things; terrent = they terrify / do terrify / are terrifying.
Nec deus intersit, nisi dignus vindice nodus (inciderit)	That a god not intervene, unless a knot show up that be worthy of such an untangler	"When the miraculous power of God is necessary, let it be resorted to: when it is not necessary, let the ordinary means be used." From Horace's Ars Poetica as a caution against deus ex machina.
nec dextrorsum, nec sinistrorsum	Neither to the right nor to the left	Do not get distracted. Motto for Bishop Cotton Boys' School and the Bishop Cotton Girls' School, both located in Bangalore, India.
nec spe, nec metu	without hope, without fear	
nec tamen consumebatur	and yet it was not consumed	Refers to the burning bush of Exodus 3:2. Motto of many Presbyterian churches throughout the world.
nec temere, nec timide	neither reckless nor timid	Motto of the Dutch 11th Air Manoeuvre Brigade and the city of Gdańsk, Poland
nec vi, nec clam, nec precario	Without permission, without secrecy, without interruption	The law of adverse possession
nec vir fortis, nec fæmina casta	if the man is not firm, the woman is not chaste	From Jonathan Swift's 1726 satire Gulliver's Travels where it is attributed to Polydore Vergil
neca eos omnes, Deus suos agnoscet	kill them all, God will know his own	alternate rendition of Caedite eos. Novit enim Dominus qui sunt eius. by Arnaud Amalric
necesse est aut imiteris aut oderis	you must either imitate or loathe the world	Seneca the Younger, Epistulae morales ad Lucilium, 7:7
necesse est credere unam tantum esse potentiam absolutam	It is necessary to believe that there is only one absolute power	
necessitas etiam timidos fortes facit	need makes even the timid brave	Sallust, The Conspiracy of Catiline, 58:19
nemine contradicente (nem. con., N.C.D.)	with no one speaking against	Less literally, "without dissent". Used especially in committees, where a matter may be passed nem. con., or unanimously, or with unanimous consent.
nemini parco	I spare no one.	Death reminding mankind we all have the same fate; found in the Middle Ages engraved in death's scythe
nemo contra Deum nisi Deus ipse	No one against God except God himself	From Goethe's autobiography From my Life: Poetry and Truth, p. 598
nemo dat quod non habet	no one gives what he does not have	Thus, "none can pass better title than they have"
nemo est supra legem (or leges)	nobody is above the law (or laws)	
Nemo igitur vir magnus sine aliquo adflatu divino umquam fuit	No great man ever existed who did not enjoy some portion of divine inspiration	From Cicero's De Natura Deorum, book 2, chapter LXVI, 167
nemo iudex in causa sua	no man shall be a judge in his own cause	Legal principle that no individual can preside over a hearing in which he holds a specific interest or bias
nemo malus felix	No one bad (is) happy	Less literally, "peace visits not the guilty mind". Also translated to "no rest for the wicked". Refers to the inherent psychological issues that plague bad/guilty people.
nemo me impune lacessit	No one provokes me with impunity	Motto of the Order of the Thistle, and consequently of Scotland, found stamped on the milled edge of certain British pound sterling coins. It is the motto of the Montressors in the Edgar Allan Poe short story "The Cask of Amontillado". Motto of the San Beda College Beta Sigma Fraternity.
nemo mortalium omnibus horis sapit	No mortal is wise at all times	The wisest may make mistakes.
nemo nisi per amicitiam cognoscitur	No one learns except by friendship	Used to imply that one must like a subject in order to study it.
nemo propheta in patria (sua)	no man is a prophet in his own land	Concept present in all four Gospels (Matthew 13:57; Mark 6:4; Luke 4:24; John 4:44).
nemo saltat sobrius	Nobody dances sober	The short and more common form of Nemo enim fere saltat sobrius, nisi forte insanit, "Nobody dances sober, unless he happens to be insane", a quote from Cicero (from the speech "Pro Murena").
nemo tenetur se ipsum accusare	no one is bound to accuse himself (the right to silence)	A maxim banning mandatory self-incrimination. Near-synonymous with accusare nemo se debet nisi coram Deo. Similar phrases include: nemo tenetur armare adversarium contra se (no one is bound to arm an opponent against himself), meaning that a defendant is not obligated to in any way assist the prosecutor to his own detriment; nemo tenetur edere instrumenta contra se (no one is bound to produce documents against himself, meaning that a defendant is not obligated to provide materials to be used against himself (this is true in Roman law and has survived in modern criminal law, but no longer applies in modern civil law); and nemo tenere prodere se ipsum (no one is bound to betray himself), meaning that a defendant is not obligated to testify against himself.
neque semper arcum tendit Apollo	nor does Apollo always keep his bow drawn	Horace, Carmina 2/10:19-20. The same image appears in a fable of Phaedrus.
Ne quid nimis	Nothing in excess	
nervos belli, pecuniam infinitam	Endless money forms the sinews of war	In war, it is essential to be able to purchase supplies and to pay troops (as Napoleon put it, "An army marches on its stomach").
nihil ad rem	nothing to do with the point	That is, in law, irrelevant and/or inconsequential.
nihil boni sine labore	nothing achieved without hard work	Motto of Palmerston North Boys' High School
nihil dicit	he says nothing	In law, a declination by a defendant to answer charges or put in a plea.
nihil difficile amanti puto	I think that nothing is difficult for a lover.	From Cicero's Orator.
nihil enim lacrima citius arescit	nothing dries sooner than a tear	Pseudo-Cicero, Rhetorica ad Herennium, 2/31:50
nihil humanum mihi alienum	nothing human is alien to me	Adapted from Terence's Heauton Timorumenos (The Self-Tormentor), homo sum humani a me nihil alienum puto ("I am a human being; nothing human is strange to me"). Sometimes ending in est.
nihil in intellectu nisi prius in sensu	nothing in the intellect unless first in sense	The guiding principle of empiricism, and accepted in some form by Aristotle, Aquinas, Locke, Berkeley, and Hume. Leibniz, however, added nisi intellectus ipse (except the intellect itself).
nihil nimis	nothing too	Or nothing to excess. Latin translation of the inscription of the Temple of Apollo at Delphi.
nihil novi	nothing of the new	Or just "nothing new". The phrase exists in two versions: as nihil novi sub sole (nothing new under the sun), from the Vulgate, and as nihil novi nisi commune consensu (nothing new unless by the common consensus), a 1505 law of the Polish–Lithuanian Commonwealth and one of the cornerstones of its Golden Liberty.
nihil obstat	nothing prevents	A notation, usually on a title page, indicating that a Roman Catholic censor has reviewed the book and found nothing objectionable to faith or morals in its content. See also imprimatur.
nihil sine Deo	nothing without God	Motto of the Kingdom of Romania, while ruled by the Hohenzollern-Sigmaringen dynasty (1878–1947).
nihil ultra	nothing beyond	Motto of St. Xavier's College, Calcutta
nil admirari	be surprised at nothing	Or "nihil admirari". Cicero, Tusculanae Disputationes (3,30), Horace, Epistulae (1,6,1), and Seneca, Epistulae morales ad Lucilium, (8,5). Motto of the Fitzgibbon family. See John FitzGibbon, 1st Earl of Clare
nil desperandum	nothing must be despaired at	"never despair"
nil igitur fieri de nilo posse fatendumst	nothing, therefore, we must confess, can be made from nothing	From Lucretius' De rerum natura (On the Nature of Things), I.205
nil igitur mors est ad nos	Death, therefore, is nothing to us	From Lucretius' De rerum natura (On the Nature of Things), III.831
nil mortalibus ardui est	nothing is impossible for humankind	From Horace's Odes. Motto of Rathkeale College, New Zealand and Brunts School, England.
nil nisi bonum	(about the dead say) nothing unless (it is) good	Short for nil nisi bonum de mortuis dicere. That is, "Don't speak ill of anyone who has died". Also Nil magnum nisi bonum (nothing is great unless good), motto of St Catherine's School, Toorak, Pennant Hills High School and Petit Seminaire Higher Secondary School.
nil nisi malis terrori	no terror, except to the bad	Motto of The King's School, Macclesfield
nil per os, rarely non per os (n.p.o.)	nothing through the mouth	Medical shorthand indicating that oral foods and fluids should be withheld from the patient.
nil satis nisi optimum	nothing [is] enough unless [it is] the best	Motto of Everton F.C., Liverpool, and several other organisations
nil sine labore	nothing without labour	Motto of many schools
nil sine numine	nothing without the divine will	Or "nothing without providence". State motto of Colorado, adopted in 1861. Probably derived from Virgil's Aeneid, book 2, line 777, non haec sine numine divum eveniunt (these things do not come to pass without the will of Heaven). See also numen.
nil volentibus arduum	Nothing [is] arduous for the willing	Nothing is impossible for the willing
nisi	unless	A decree nisi is a court order (often for divorce) that will come into force on a certain date "unless" cause is shown why it should not.
nisi Dominus frustra	if not the Lord, [it is] in vain	That is, "everything is in vain without God". Summarized from Psalm 127 (126 Vulgate), nisi Dominus aedificaverit domum in vanum laboraverunt qui aedificant eam nisi Dominus custodierit civitatem frustra vigilavit qui custodit (unless the Lord builds the house, they work on a useless thing who build it; unless the Lord guards the community, he keeps watch in vain who guards it); widely used motto.
nisi paria non pugnant	Unless there are a pair, they do not fight.	Less literally, "it takes two to make a fight". Irascetur aliquis: tu contra beneficiis prouoca; cadit statim simultas ab altera parte deserta; nisi paria non pugnant. (If any one is angry with you, meet his anger by returning benefits for it: a quarrel which is only taken up on one side falls to the ground: it takes two men to fight.) Seneca the Younger, De Ira (On Anger): Book 2, cap. 34, line 5.
nisi prius	unless previously	In England, a direction that a case be brought up to Westminster for trial before a single judge and jury. In the United States, a court where civil actions are tried by a single judge sitting with a jury, as distinguished from an appellate court.
nitimur in vetitum	We strive for the forbidden	From Ovid's Amores, III.4:17. It means that when we are denied of something, we will eagerly pursue the denied thing. Used by Friedrich Nietzsche in his Ecce Homo to indicate that his philosophy pursues what is forbidden to other philosophers.
nobis bene, nemini male	Good for us, Bad for no one	Inscription on the old Nobistor gatepost that divided Altona and St. Pauli
nolens volens	unwilling, willing	That is, "whether unwillingly or willingly". Sometimes rendered volens nolens, aut nolens aut volens or nolentis volentis. Similar to willy-nilly, though that word is derived from Old English will-he nil-he ([whether] he will or [whether] he will not).
noli me tangere	do not touch me	Commonly translated "touch me not". According to the Gospel of John, this was said by Jesus to Mary Magdalene after his resurrection.
Noli turbare circulos meos!	Do not disturb my circles!	That is, "Don't upset my calculations!" Said by Archimedes to a Roman soldier who, despite having been given orders not to, killed Archimedes at the conquest of Syracuse, Sicily.
nolite timere	be not afraid	heraldic motto, from Luke 2:10–12
nolle prosequi	to be unwilling to prosecute	A legal motion by a prosecutor or other plaintiff to drop legal charges, usually in exchange for a diversion program or out-of-court settlement.
nolo contendere	I do not wish to contend	That is, "no contest". A plea that can be entered on behalf of a defendant in a court that states that the accused doesn't admit guilt, but will accept punishment for a crime. Nolo contendere pleas cannot be used as evidence in another trial.
nomen amicitiae sic, quatenus expedit, haeret	the name of friendship lasts just so long as it is profitable	Petronius, Satyricon, 80.
nomen dubium	doubtful name	A scientific name of unknown or doubtful application.
nomen est omen	the name is a sign	Thus, "true to its name".
nomen nescio (N.N.)	I do not know the name	Thus, the name or person in question is unknown.
nomen mysticum	mystic name	secret members' name in some organizations
nomen nudum	naked name	A purported scientific name that does not fulfill the proper formal criteria and therefore cannot be used unless it is subsequently proposed correctly.
non Angli sed angeli, si forent Christiani	They are not Angles, but angels, if they were Christian	A pun, ascribed (in a different wording) by Bede to Pope Gregory I, said to have been uttered by the latter on seeing pale-skinned Angle children at a slave market.
non auro, sed ferro, recuperanda est patria	Not with gold, but with iron must the fatherland be reclaimed	According to some Roman this sentence was said by Marcus Furius Camillus to Brennus, the chief of the Gauls, after he demanded more gold from the citizens of the recently sacked Rome in 390 BC.
non bene pro toto libertas venditur auro	liberty is not well sold for all the gold	Motto of Republic of Ragusa, inscribed over the gates of St. Lawrence Fortress. From Gualterus Anglicus's version of Aesop's fable "The Dog and the Wolf".
non bis in idem	not twice in the same thing	A legal principle forbidding double jeopardy.
non canimus surdis, respondent omnia silvae	we sing not to the deaf; the trees echo every word	Virgil, Eclogues 10:8
non causa pro causa	not the cause for the cause	Also known as the "questionable cause" or "false cause". Refers to any logical fallacy where a cause is incorrectly identified.
non compos mentis	not in control of the mind	See compos mentis. Also rendered non compos sui (not in control of himself). Samuel Johnson theorized that the word nincompoop may derive from this phrase.
non constat	it is not certain	Used to explain scientific phenomena and religious advocations, for example in medieval history, for rulers to issue a 'Non Constat' decree, banning the worship of a holy figure. In legal context, occasionally a backing for nulling information that was presented by an attorney. Without any tangible proof, Non constat information is difficult to argue for.
non ducor, duco	I am not led; I lead	Motto of São Paulo city, Brazil. See also pro Brasilia fiant eximia.
non est factum	it is not [my] deed	a doctrine in contract law that allows a signing party to escape performance of the agreement. A claim of "non est factum" means that the signature on the contract was signed by mistake, without knowledge of its meaning, but was not done so negligently. A successful plea would make the contract void ab initio.
non est princeps super leges, sed leges supra principem	the prince is not above the laws, but the law is above the prince.	Pliny the Younger, Panegyricus 65:1.
non extinguetur	shall not be extinguished	Motto of the Society of Antiquaries of London accompanying their Lamp of knowledge emblem
non facias malum ut inde fiat bonum	you should not make evil in order that good may be made from it	More simply, "don't do wrong to do right". The direct opposite of the phrase "the ends justify the means".
non hos quaesitum munus in usus	A gift sought for no such purpose	Virgil, Aeneid, 4:647, of the sword with which Dido will commit suicide. "Not for so dire an enterprise design’d." (Dryden trans.; 1697) "A gift asked for no use like this." (Mackail trans.; 1885). "Ne'er given for an end so dire." (Taylor trans.; 1907) "A gift not asked for use like this!" (Williams trans.; 1910). Quoted by Francis Bacon of the civil law, "not made for the countries it governeth".
non impediti ratione cogitationis	unencumbered by the thought process	motto of radio show Car Talk
non in legendo sed in intelligendo leges consistunt	the laws depend not on being read, but on being understood	
non licet omnibus adire Corinthum	not everyone can go to Corinth	The legendary pleasures of Corinth were also quite expensive. Used to refer to anything that not everyone can afford or have the chance to do.
non liquet	it is not proven	Also "it is not clear" or "it is not evident". A sometimes controversial decision handed down by a judge when they feel that the law is not complete.
non loqui sed facere	not talk but action	Motto of the University of Western Australia's Engineering faculty student society.
non mihi solum	not for myself alone	Motto of Anderson Junior College, Singapore.
non ministrari sed ministrare	not to be served, but to serve	Motto of Wellesley College and Shimer College (from Matthew 20:28 in the Vulgate).
non multa sed multum	not quantity but quality	Motto of the Daniel Pearl Magnet High School.
non nisi parendo vincitur	[Nature] cannot be conquered except by being obeyed	From Francis Bacon's Cogitata et visa.
Non nobis Domine	Not to us (oh) Lord	Christian hymn based on Psalm 115.
non nobis nati	'Born not for ourselves'	Motto of St Albans School (Hertfordshire)
non nobis solum	not for ourselves alone	Appears in Cicero's De Officiis Book 1:22 in the form non nobis solum nati sumus (we are not born for ourselves alone). Motto of Lower Canada College, Montreal and University College, Durham University, Willamette University, Gillotts School Henley.
non numerantur, sed ponderantur	they are not counted, but weighed	Old saying. Paul Erdős (1913–1996), in The Man Who Loved Only Numbers by Paul Hoffman
non obstante veredicto	not standing in the way of a verdict	A judgment notwithstanding verdict, a legal motion asking the court to reverse the jury's verdict on the grounds that the jury could not have reached such a verdict reasonably.
non olet	it doesn't smell	See pecunia non olet.
non omne quod nitet aurum est	All that glitters is not gold	
non omnia possumus omnes	not everyone can do everything	Virgil, Eclogues 8:63 (and others).
non omnis moriar	I shall not all die	Horace, Carmina 3/30:6. "Not all of me will die", a phrase expressing the belief that a part of the speaker will survive beyond death.
non plus ultra	nothing further beyond	the ultimate. See also ne plus ultra
non possumus	we cannot	
non possunt primi esse omnes omni in tempore	not everyone can occupy the first rank forever	(It is impossible always to excel) Decimus Laberius
non progredi est regredi	to not go forward is to go backward	
non prosequitur	he does not proceed	A judgment in favor of a defendant when the plaintiff failed to take the necessary steps in an action within the time allowed
non qui parum habet, sed qui plus cupit, pauper est	It is not he who has little, but he who wants more, who is the pauper.	Seneca the Younger, Epistulae morales ad Lucilium, 2:6.
non quis sed quid	not who but what	Used in the sense "what matters is not who says it but what he says" – a warning against ad hominem arguments; frequently used as motto, including that of Southwestern University.
non satis scire	to know is not enough	Motto of Hampshire College
non scholae sed vitae	[We learn] not for school but for life	An inversion of non vitae sed scholae now used as a school motto
non sequitur	it does not follow	In general, a comment which is absurd due to not making sense in its context (rather than due to being inherently nonsensical or internally inconsistent), often used in humor. As a logical fallacy, a conclusion that does not follow from a premise.
non serviam	I will not serve	Possibly derived from a Vulgate mistranslation of the Book of Jeremiah. Commonly used in literature as Satan's statement of disobedience to God, though in the original context the quote is attributed to Israel, not Satan.
non sibi	Not for self	A slogan used by many schools and universities.
non sibi solum	Not for self alone	A slogan used by many schools and universities.
non sibi, sed patriae	Not for self, but for country	Engraved on the doors of the United States Naval Academy chapel; motto of the USS Halyburton (FFG-40).
non sibi, sed suis	Not for one's self but for one's own	A slogan used by many schools and universities.
non sibi, sed omnibus	Not for one's self but for all	A slogan used by many schools and universities.
non sic dormit, sed vigilat	Sleeps not but is awake	Martin Luther on mortality of the soul.
non silba, sed anthar; Deo vindice	Not for self, but for others; God will vindicate	A slogan used by the Ku Klux Klan. Note that this is not accurate Latin but rather a mixture of Latin and Gothic
non sum qualis eram	I am not such as I was	Or "I am not the kind of person I once was". Expresses a change in the speaker. Horace, Odes 4/1:3.
non teneas aurum totum quod splendet ut aurum	Do not hold as gold all that shines as gold	Also, "All that glitters is not gold." Shakespeare in The Merchant of Venice.
non timebo mala	I will fear no evil	It is possibly a reference to Psalm 23. Printed on the Colt in Supernatural.
non vestra sed vos	Not yours but you	Motto of St Chad's College, Durham.
non vitae sed scholae	[We learn] not for life but for schooltime	From a passage of occupatio in Seneca the Younger's moral letters to Lucilius, wherein Lucilius is given the argument that too much literature fails to prepare students for life
non vi, sed verbo	Not by force, but by the word [of God]	From Martin Luther's Invocavit sermons preached in March 1522 against the Zwickau prophets unrest in Wittenberg; later echoed in the Augsburg Confession as ...sine vi humana, sed Verbo: bishops should act "without human force, but through the Word".
nosce te ipsum	know thyself	From Cicero, based on the Greek γνῶθι σεαυτόν (gnothi seauton), inscribed on the pronaos of the Temple of Apollo at Delphi, according to the Greek periegetic writer Pausanias (10.24.1). A non-traditional Latin rendering, temet nosce (thine own self know), is translated in The Matrix as "know thyself".
noscitur a sociis	a word is known by the company it keeps	In statutory interpretation, when a word is ambiguous, its meaning may be determined by reference to the rest of the statute.
noster nostri	Literally "Our ours"	Approximately "Our hearts beat as one."
nota bene (n.b.)	mark well	That is, "please note" or "note it well".
novus ordo seclorum	new order of the ages	From Virgil. Motto on the Great Seal of the United States. Similar to Novus Ordo Mundi (New World Order).
nulla dies sine linea	Not a day without a line drawn	Pliny the Elder attributes this maxim to Apelles, an ancient Greek artist.
nulla dies umquam memori vos eximet aevo	No day shall erase you from the memory of time	From Virgil's Aeneid, Book IX, line 447, on the episode of Nisus and Euryalus.
nulla poena sine lege	no penalty without a law	Refers to the legal principle that one cannot be punished for doing something that is not prohibited by law, and is related to Nullum crimen, nulla poena sine praevia lege poenali.
nulla quaestio	there is no question, there is no issue	
nulla tenaci invia est via	For the tenacious, no road is impassable	Motto of the Dutch car builder Spyker.
nullam rem natam	no thing born	That is, "nothing". It has been theorized that this expression is the origin of Italian nulla, French rien, and Spanish and Portuguese nada, all with the same meaning.
nulli secundus	second to none	Motto of the Coldstream Guards and Nine Squadron Royal Australian Corps of Transport and the Pretoria Armour Regiment.
nullius in verba	On the word of no man	Motto of the Royal Society.
nullum crimen, nulla poena sine praevia lege poenali	no crime, no punishment without a previous penal law	Legal principle meaning that one cannot be penalised for doing something that is not prohibited by law; penal law cannot be enacted retroactively.
nullum magnum ingenium sine mixtura dementiae fuit	There has been no great wisdom without an element of madness	From De Tranquillitate Animi, Seneca the Younger.
numen lumen	God our light	The motto of the University of Wisconsin–Madison. The motto of Elon University.
numerus clausus	closed number	A method to limit the number of students who may study at a university.
nunc aut nunquam	now or never	Motto of the Korps Commandotroepen, Dutch elite special forces.
nunc dimittis	now you send	beginning of the Song of Simeon, from the Gospel of Luke.
nunc est bibendum	now is the time to drink	Carpe-Diem-type phrase from the Odes of Horace, Nunc est bibendum, nunc pede libero pulsanda tellus (Now is the time to drink, now the time to dance footloose upon the earth). Used as a slogan by Michelin and the origin of the Michelin Man's name Bibendum.
nunc id vides, nunc ne vides	now you see it, now you don't	The motto of Unseen University from the Discworld books by Terry Pratchett.
nunc pro tunc	now for then	Something that has retroactive effect, is effective from an earlier date.
nunc scio quid sit amor	now I know what love is	From Virgil, Eclogues VIII.
nunquam minus solus quam cum solus	never less alone than when alone	
nunquam non paratus	never unprepared, ever ready, always ready	frequently used as motto, e.g. for the Scottish Clan Johnstone, where it is anglicized as "Ready, Aye, Ready"
nunquam obliviscar	never forget	
Nusquam est qui ubique est	He who is everywhere is nowhere	Seneca the Younger, second Epistulae Morales ad Lucilium
