= HJS =

HJS may refer to:

- HJS Akatemia, currently HJS, a Finnish football club
- Croatian Sailing Federation (Croatian: Hrvatski jedriličarski savez)
- Henry Jackson Society, a British think tank
- Higher Judicial Service, state civil services for judiciary in India
- Hindu Janajagruti Samiti, an Indian civil rights organisation
- Paarl Boys' High School, in Western Cape Province, South Africa
- Sikorsky HJS, an American helicopter
- Hic jacet sepultus (Latin; "here lies buried"); see List of Latin phrases (H)
