= De Providentia =

Essay by Seneca

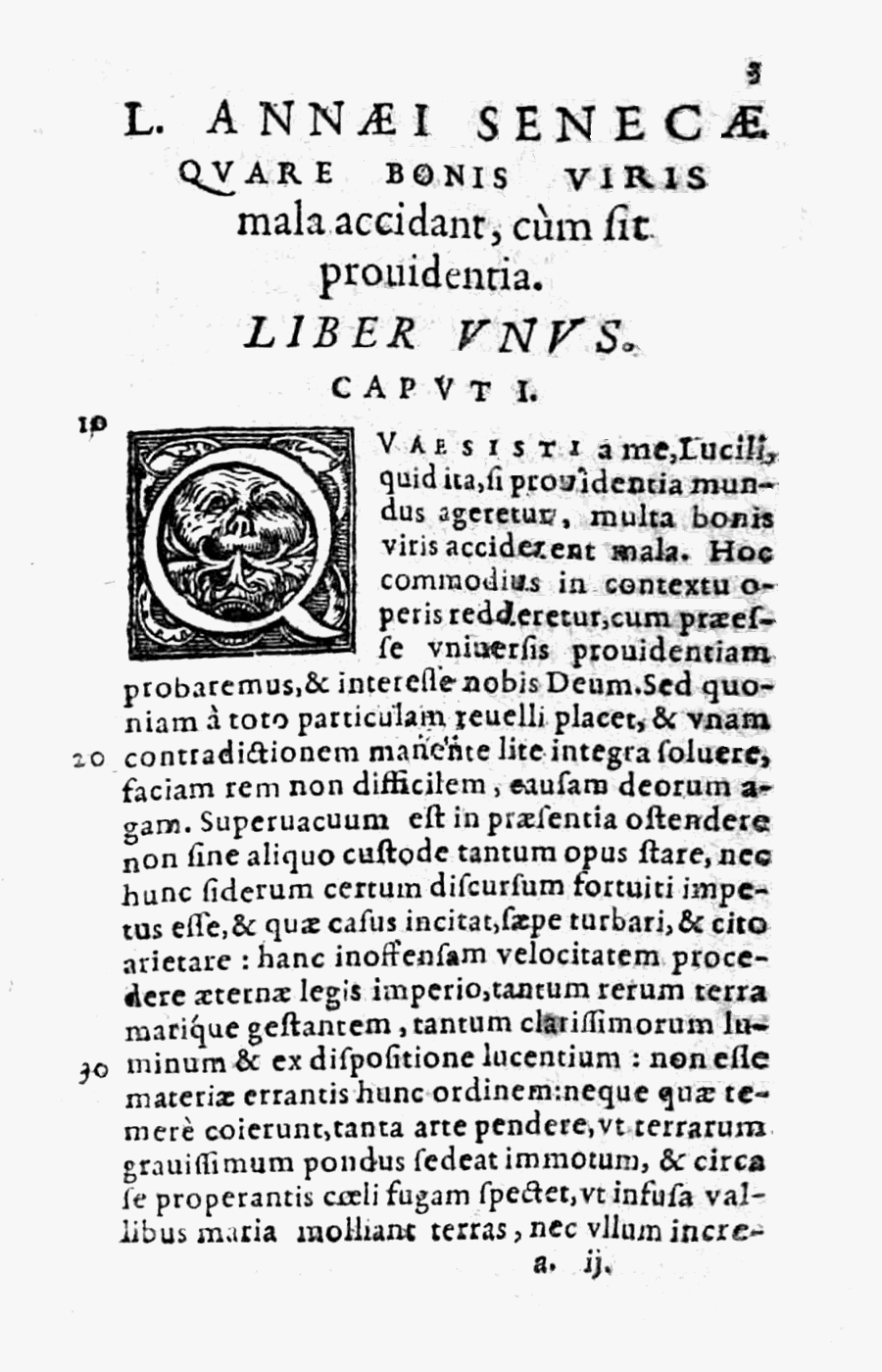
- From the 1594 edition, published by Jean Le Preux
- Author: Lucius Annaeus Seneca
- Language: Latin
- Subject: Roman religion, Ancient Greek religion, problem of evil
- Genre: Theodicy, philosophy
- Publication date: AD c. 64
- Publication place: Ancient Rome

De Providentia (On Providence) is a short essay in the form of a dialogue in six brief sections, written by the Latin philosopher Seneca (died AD 65) in the last years of his life. He chose the dialogue form (as in the well-known Plato's works) to deal with the problem of the co-existence of the Stoic design of providence with the evil in the world—the so-called "problem of evil."

== Dating and title ==
The work cannot be precisely dated, but since it is addressed to Lucilius, who is the addressee of some of Seneca's final works including his Letters, and since the essay has similarities to letters 106, 108, and 109 then the work is usually considered a late one dating to around 64 AD.

The full title of the work is Quare bonis viris multa mala accidant, cum sit providentia ("Why do misfortunes happen to good men, if providence exists"). This longer title reflects the true theme of the essay which is not so much concerned with providence but with theodicy and the question of why bad things happen to good people.

== Contents ==
The dialogue is opened by Lucilius complaining with his friend Seneca that adversities and misfortunes can happen to good men too. How can this fit with the goodness connected with the design of providence? Seneca answers according to the Stoic point of view. Nothing actually bad can happen to the good man (the wise man) because opposites don't mix. What looks like adversity is in fact a means by which the man exerts his virtues. As such, he can come out of the ordeal stronger than before.

So, in perfect harmony with the Stoic philosophy, Seneca explains that the truly wise man can never surrender in the face of misfortunes but as he will always go through them and even if he should fall he will continue fighting on his knees ("si cecidit de genu pugnat"). The wise man understands destiny and its design, and therefore he has nothing to fear from the future. Neither does he hope for anything, because he already has everything he needs—his good behaviour.

The conclusion is that actually nothing bad happens to good men. One just has to understand what bad means: bad for the wise man would be to have bad thoughts, to commit crimes, to desire money or fame. Whoever behaves wisely already has all the good possible.

== Text ==
=== Translations ===
- John Davie (2007), Seneca: Dialogues and Essays. Oxford World Classics. ISBN 9780199552405
- Elaine Fantham, Harry M. Hine, James Ker, Gareth D. Williams (2014). Seneca: Hardship and Happiness. University of Chicago Press. ISBN 0226748332
- Peter J. Anderson (2015), Seneca: Selected Dialogues and Consolations. Hackett Publishing. ISBN 1624663680
