= Bobok =

1873 short story by Fyodor Dostoevsky

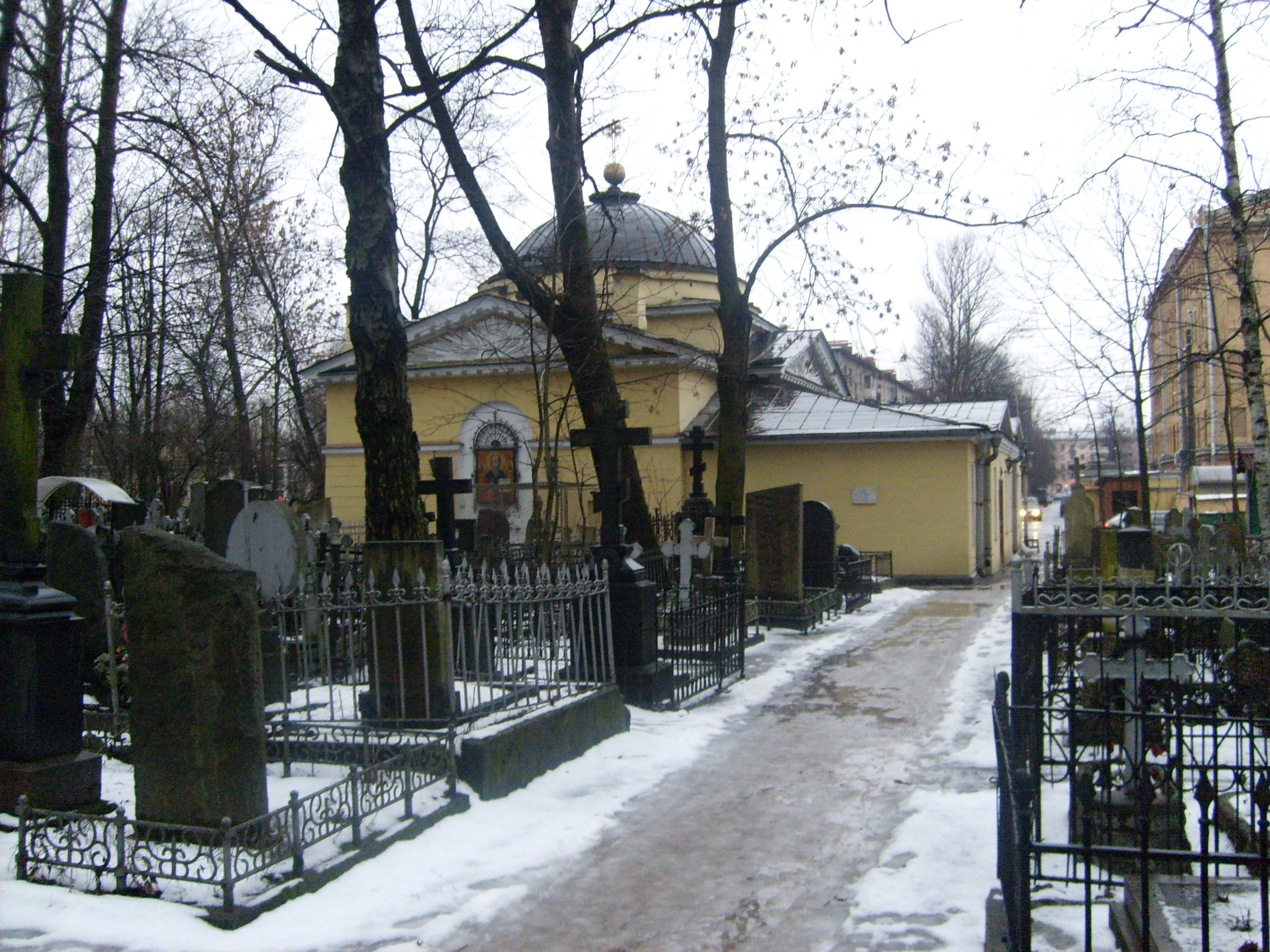
"Bobok" takes place in a cemetery, perhaps similar to this one in St. Petersburg.

"Bobok" (Russian: Бобок, Bobok) is a short story by Fyodor Dostoevsky that first appeared in 1873 in his self-published Diary of a Writer. The story consists largely of a dialogue between recently deceased occupants of graves in a cemetery, most of whom are fully conscious and retain all the features of their living personalities. The dialogue is overheard by a troubled writer who has lain down near the graves.

The title "Bobok" refers to a nonsensical utterance repeatedly made by one of the cemetery's residents, an almost completely decomposed corpse who is otherwise silent. The writer also reports a kind of auditory hallucination of the word prior to his hearing of the dialogue. The sound suggests "little bean" in Russian, but in the context of the story is taken to be synonymous with gibberish.

The philosopher and literary critic Mikhail Bakhtin regarded Bobok as one of the finest works in the literary tradition of Menippean satire, and argues that it encapsulates many of the thematic concerns of Dostoevsky's major novels.

== Synopsis ==
The story begins with a stream of short, self-referring internal polemics with various individuals and points of view by a frustrated writer called Ivan Ivanovich. The apparently disconnected and random nature of his speech suggests some sort of mental disturbance, possibly related to delirium tremens: his very first polemical engagement is with an acquaintance who has asked him if he will ever be sober. He is aware himself that something strange is happening to him: "not voices exactly, but it's as if someone right beside me is saying 'Bobok, bobok, bobok!'"

Ivan Ivanovich goes out in search of distraction and chances upon a funeral. It turns out to be that of a distant relative of his, a collegiate councillor with five unmarried daughters. He joins the procession but is ignored by his relative's family. He observes and contemplates the cemetery—the smell, the newly arrived corpses, the graves, the mourners—some of whom are only pretending to mourn and others who are openly cheerful. When everyone leaves he stays at the cemetery and falls into contemplation. After sitting for a long time, his mind wandering, he lies down on a long stone coffin and is shocked to find that the voices of the recently deceased and buried seem to become audible to him. He listens to their conversation. A variety of individuals, all disembodied continuations of their living personalities, converse and argue with each other. It seems that physical death is not final death and that here, according to the philosopher Platon Nikolaevich, "the remnants of life are concentrated, but only in consciousness" and continue for a time "as if by inertia". Despite their "dead" status, the corpses are not only able to hear each other but to smell each other, a state of affairs that Platon Nikolaevich explains as a stench of the soul meant to bring it to a new state of awareness. Though one or two individuals show a sober and pious attitude to their situation, most of them exhibit a propensity to hold on to, and even reinforce and exaggerate, the moral failings of their earthly personalities. A new arrival called Baron Klinevich suggests that they entertain themselves and each other by revealing all the shameful details of their earthly lives, a proposal that is met with gleeful and almost universal approval. Pandemonium descends, but at this point Ivan Ivanovich suddenly sneezes, and the dead are silent thereafter. Ivan Ivanovich leaves the cemetery distressed that depravity exists even in the grave, "the last moments of consciousness". He feels that despite the desire to lose their sense of shame, the dead have a secret that they carefully conceal from mortal men. He contemplates returning to listen to their stories, and to visit other parts of the cemetery to get a fuller understanding of what is going on. He thinks he will be able to publish his account in The Citizen.

== Characters ==
- Ivan Ivanovich, the narrator, is an alienated and cynical writer with a character comparable to that of the underground man in Notes from Underground. His writing style is concise and categorical but simultaneously ambiguous and evasive. He polemicizes with everyone – friends, editors who reject his work, the contemporary public and, after listening to the underground dialogue, with "contemporary corpses".
- Lebeziatnikov, an obsequious official with a "soft and saccharine" voice, is the first voice to be heard, discussing a card game played from memory with his superior, General Pervoedov. Throughout the ensuing dialogues Lebeziatnikov acts as a "sepulchral minion" to the General and assumes a kind of explanatory role for others in relation to 'life' in the grave.
- General Pervoedov, the owner of the grave directly under the narrator. In contrast to Lebeziatnikov his voice is "weighty and authoritative": it is clear that he wishes to maintain in the grave the dignity and importance that attached to his life on the surface. Lebeziatnikov is more than happy to play along, but others such as Avdotia Ignatievna and Baron Klinevich contemptuously dismiss his pretensions and gleefully insult him.
- Avdotia Ignatievna, an irritable high society lady who insults and argues with a number of the others, including a shopkeeper who lies next to her, and the General, who refers to her as a "twittering busybody". She has a great urge to lose her sense of shame and is delighted by Baron Klinevich's suggestion.
- A shopkeeper, the only participant in the dialogue who maintains a connection with the faith of the common people, and who therefore accepts death as a sacrament and interprets what is going on as the tribulations of sinful souls after death.
- "A whining newcomer", who died unexpectedly after having "complications" and can't accept that he is dead and buried. The narrator remembers seeing him in his coffin with a terrified and repulsive expression on his face.
- Baron Klinevich is a recently deceased libertine-nobleman who characterizes himself as a "scoundrel of pseudo-high society". He proposes to the other corpses that for their remaining time they "cast aside all shame" and amuse each other by not lying about themselves. He complains that in his own life he was constantly encountering moral and societal restraints on his predatory nature and that life was synonymous with lying, but that here in death they could spend their short remaining time reveling in "shameless truthfulness".
- Privy Councilor Tarasevich, a very high ranking official who died just after it was discovered that he had stolen 400,000 rubles from a government support scheme for widows and orphans. Klinevich suggests that it was those widows and orphans that "warmed his blood" for a life of dissipation, and Tarasevich's subsequent utterances tend to confirm this impression.
- Katish Berestova, a 16 year old girl who responds when addressed, but only ever with a lascivious giggle. She has "a cracked, girlish voice, but in that voice one felt something like the prick of a needle." Klinevich, who knew her in life, recommends her to Tarasevich, who reacts with trembling anticipation.
- An engineer, newly deceased, who babbles nonsense for a time but becomes coherent and animated when Klinevich proposes the abandonment of shame. As he understands it, the Baron is proposing that they organise life in the grave on "new and rational principles".
- Platon Nikolaevich is a deceased philosopher who (according to Lebeziatnikov) explains how the life of the conscious mind and the formerly living personality continues for a short time (usually 2–3 months but sometimes up to 6 months) after death, but now without any associated bodily reality, concentrated somehow only in consciousness.
- An almost entirely decomposed corpse who (according to Lebeziatnikov) comes to life every six weeks and mutters "Bobok, Bobok."

== Themes ==
According to Mikhail Bakhtin, thematically Bobok is "almost a microcosm of [Dostoevsky's] entire creative output." Among such themes are: the idea that if there is no God and no immortality of the soul then "everything is permitted"; the related theme of confession as "shameless truth" with no need of repentance; the consideration of the final moments of consciousness, connected to the themes of capital punishment and suicide in other works, for example in The Idiot; the theme of insanity; the theme of sensuality and its apparent inseparability from consciousness in any sphere; the theme of the nihilistic chaos of life and thought when they are cut off from national roots and spiritual faith.

Some of the characters are abbreviated versions of types that appear in the novels. The libertine advocate of shamelessness Klinevich is a concentrated miniature of characters like Svidrigailov from Crime and Punishment, Fyodor Pavlovich from The Brothers Karamazov, and Prince Valkovsky from Humiliated and Insulted. The bitter and ironic narrator (referred to in the subtitle as "a certain person") is a type akin to the Underground Man in Notes From Underground. The dissipated old official who has been found to have embezzled a huge sum of public funds, the self-important General, the sycophantic but knowledgeable junior official, the Engineer with revolutionary inclinations, and the humble shopkeeper who has retained his connection to his people and his faith, are all types that are familiar to readers of Dostoevsky's larger works.

=== Menippean satire ===
Almost all the essential characteristics of the ancient genre known as Menippean satire are present in Bobok. The narrator is an outsider, on the threshold between sanity and insanity, whose speech is "internally dialogised and shot through with polemic". In this equivocal style he discusses the relativity of reason and madness, of intelligence and stupidity, and meditates on the themes of astonishment and respect. He describes the funeral and the cemetery in a familiar and profanatory tone, with incongruous, oxymoronic combinations, and the crude naturalism, debasing and bringing-down-to-earth that is characteristic of the carnivalised literary text. The dialogue of the dead is an anacrisis played out in an extraordinary situation—the final life of the conscious mind in the grave—in which the corpses are provoked to fully reveal themselves, free of all the conditions, laws and obligations of ordinary life.

== Background ==
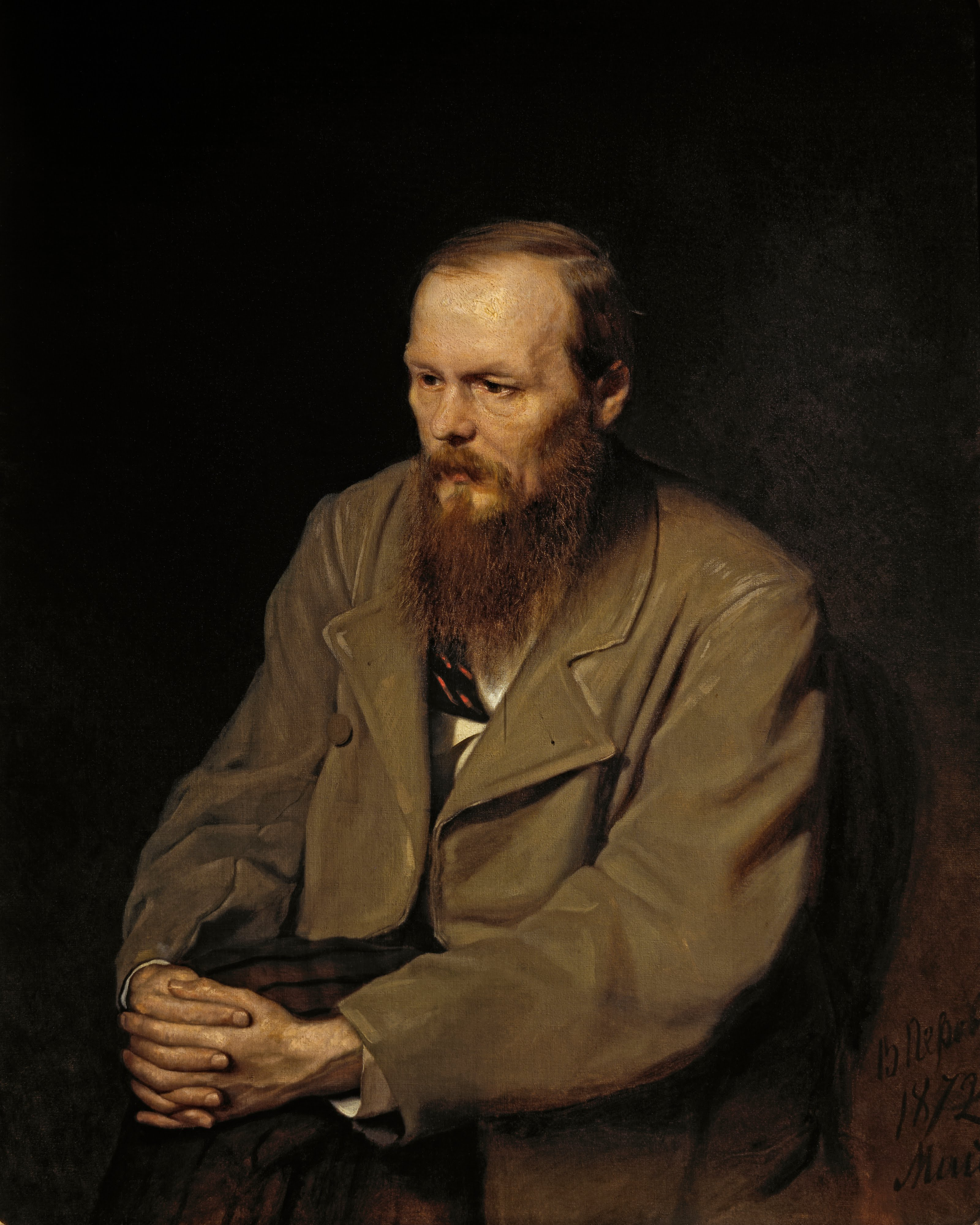
Vasily Perov's Portrait of Fyodor Dostoevsky, which was an indirect cause for the writing of Bobok.

Dostoevsky was prompted to write the story by a journalist's reaction to the first instalments of the Diary of a Writer. At the time, Dostoevsky edited the newspaper-magazine "The Citizen", where the first chapters of the Diary were printed. The liberal newspaper "The Voice" published a response to the Diary written by the journalist L. K. Panyutin (writing under the pseudonym Nil Admirari). Dostoevsky's attention was piqued by one passage in particular:

"The Diary of a Writer" reminds one of the famous diary that ends with the exclamation "Still, the Algerian Bey has a bump on his nose!" [Nikolai Gogol's short story "Diary of a Madman"]. It is enough to look at the portrait of the author, currently exhibited at the Academy of Arts, in which we feel for Mr. Dostoevsky the very “pity” that he so inappropriately mocks in his magazine. This is a portrait of a person exhausted by a serious illness.

The narrator of "Bobok" responds to the journalist at the beginning of the story, among a stream of apparently random polemics:

I am not offended, I am a timid man; but, nevertheless, they made me out to be mad. An artist happened to paint a portrait of me: "After all," he says, "you are a writer." So I let him have his way, and he put the portrait on exhibit. And now I read: "Go and look at this sickly, almost insane face." Well, let it be so, but do they have to say it so directly in print? Everything that appears in print should be noble; ideals are necessary, but here ...

The portrait is alluded to again in the closing sentences of "Bobok", as Ivan Ivanovich contemplates publishing an account of his experience: "I will take it to "the Citizen". One of the editors there also had his portrait exhibited." Dostoevsky was not merely concerned with drawing attention to the journalist's tactlessness. As in Gogol's story, the abrupt, disjointed style of the narration and the qualities of the narrator's experience suggest a man on the brink of madness, although there is an implication that it is related to alcoholism rather than the epilepsy from which Dostoevsky suffered.

The narrator's polemic on the subject of astonishment seems to be aimed at Panyutin’s pseudonym Nil Admirari (nihil admirari, "not to be surprised at anything" – Horace). According to Ivan Ivanovich:

It's ridiculous, of course, to be surprized at everything, while being surprized at nothing is much more attractive and for some reason is considered good form. But it is hardly so in reality. In my opinion, being surprised at nothing is much more stupid than to be surprized at everything. And besides, to be surprized at nothing is almost the same as to respect nothing. A stupid person isn't capable of respect.

The cemetery setting and dialogue was in part a satirical response to Panyutin. In 1870, Panyutin published a feuilleton in "The Voice" dedicated to the festivities at the Smolensk cemetery. The main character of the feuilleton also observes the behavior of the crowd in the cemetery, analyzes the "drunken" conversations of the still living people, and then, tired, decides to rest on one of the graves, having previously asked permission from the deceased. The dead man, allowing the weary observer to take a nap on his grave, enters into conversation with him, inquiring about the latest news from the living world.

== Subtitle and sequel ==
"Bobok" was the 6th article to appear in Dostoevsky's Diary, in 1873 – the first year of its publication. Probably prompted by Panyutin's comparison of the Diary of a Writer to Gogol's Diary (Запискам, zapiskam) of a Madman, Dostoevsky gave "Bobok" the subtitle "Notes (Записки, zapiski) of a Certain Person". At the top of the article he wrote:

On this occasion I shall include "The Notes of a Certain Person." That person is not I, but someone else entirely. I think no further foreword is needed.

The 8th article of 1873 is entitled "A Half-Letter from 'A Certain Person' ", which the author of the diary describes as being by "that same 'person', the very one who has already once distinguished himself in The Citizen on the subject of graves." The author of the diary discusses, in an exasperated tone, this "person", who has written him a long and convoluted letter in which he attacks and admonishes all sorts of people, particularly those in publishing, including the letter's addressee. The diary's author agrees to publish the letter, partly in an effort to finally appease and get rid of the "person". He refuses to publish the first half of the letter due to its excessive vitriol, so it begins halfway through, in the middle of a sentence.
