= Battle of Cumae =

Battle of Cumae may refer to:

- Battle of Cumae (524 BC), land battle between Cumae and an Etruscan alliance
- Battle of Cumae (474 BC), naval battle between Syracuse–Cumae and the Etruscans
- Battle of Cumae (215 BC), land battle between Rome–Cumae and Carthage–Capua
- Battle of Cumae (38 BC), naval battle of the Roman civil war
