= Alfia =

Alfia may refer to:

- Alfia (gens), a Roman gens
- Alfia Nazmutdinova (born 1949), Soviet gymnast
- Kfir Alfia, American activist
