= Marius Alfius =

Marius Alfius was a medix tuticus (leader), a position equivalent to supreme magistrate of the people of Campania. He was an ally of Hannibal during the Second Punic War, especially during the Battle of Cumae in 215 BC. He was defeated and killed by the Roman consul Tiberius Gracchus in this battle, when he launched an unexpected attack on an assembly in which over 2,000 Campanian warriors were killed, along with 34 military standards lost.

== See also ==
- Alfia gens
