= Lacrimae rerum =

Latin phrase after Virgil's Aeneid

Lacrimae rerum (Latin: [ˈlakrɪmae̯ ˈreːrũː]) is the Latin phrase for "tears of things". It derives from Book I, line 462 of the Aeneid (c. 29–19 BC), by Roman poet Virgil (Publius Vergilius Maro) (70–19 BC). Some recent quotations have included rerum lacrimae sunt or sunt lacrimae rerum meaning "there are tears of (or for) things".

== Background ==
In this passage, Aeneas gazes at a mural found in a Carthaginian temple dedicated to Juno that depicts battles of the Trojan War and the deaths of his friends and countrymen. Aeneas is moved to tears and says "sunt lacrimae rerum et mentem mortalia tangunt" ("There are tears for [or 'of'] things and mortal things touch the mind.")

== Two interpretations ==
The genitive "rerum" can be construed as "objective" or "subjective". The scholar David Wharton observes that the "semantic and referential indeterminacy is both intentional and poetically productive, lending it an implicational richness most readers find attractive". In English, however, a translator must choose either one or the other, and interpretation has varied. Those who take the genitive as subjective translate the phrase as meaning that things feel sorrow for the sufferings of humanity: the universe feels our pain.

Others translate the passage to show that the burden human beings must bear, ever-present frailty and suffering, is what defines the essence of human experience. Yet in the next line, Aeneas says: "Release (your) fear; this fame will bring you some deliverance." Those who take the genitive as objective understand the phrase as meaning that there are tears for things (in particular, the things Aeneas has endured) evinced in the mural: i.e., the paintings show Aeneas that he finds himself in a place where he can expect compassion and safety.

== Context and translations ==
The context of the passage is as follows. Aeneas sees on the temple mural depictions of key figures in the Trojan War, the war from which he had been driven to the alien shores of Carthage as a refugee: the sons of Atreus (Agamemnon and Menelaus), Priam, and Achilles, who was savage to both sides in the war. He then cries out:

"Sunt hic etiam sua praemia laudi;
sunt lacrimae rerum et mentem mortalia tangunt.
Solve metus; feret haec aliquam tibi fama salutem."

"Here, too, the praiseworthy has its rewards;
there are tears for things and mortal things touch the mind.
Release your fear; this fame will bring you some safety."
Virgil, Aeneid, 1.461 ff.

A translation by Robert Fagles renders the quote as: "The world is a world of tears, and the burdens of mortality touch the heart."

Robert Fitzgerald, meanwhile, translates it as: "They weep here / For how the world goes, and our life that passes / Touches their hearts."

In his television series Civilisation, episode 1, Kenneth Clark translated this line as "These men know the pathos of life, and mortal things touch their hearts."

The poet Seamus Heaney rendered the first three words, "There are tears at the heart of things."

== Usage ==
The phrase is sometimes taken out of context, on war memorials for example, as a sad sentiment about life's inescapable sorrows. In the poem the phrase appears as Aeneas realizes that he need not fear for his safety, because he is among people who have compassion and an understanding of human sorrow.

=== In popular culture ===
- "Sunt Lacrimae rerum" is the fifth piece in Franz Liszt's third and last volume of his Years of Pilgrimage (Années de pèlerinage).
- David Mitchell uses the phrase as the last sign-off in the letters from Robert Frobisher to his friend Sixsmith in the penultimate section of his novel Cloud Atlas.
- W. H. Auden uses the phrase in his poem "A Walk after Dark".
- Wisława Szymborska uses the phrase in her poem Lata Sześćdziesiąte, translated to English as "A Film From the Sixties".
- In the introductory video of his YouTube series The Dictionary of Obscure Sorrows, John Koenig uses the phrase, and sentiment, to introduce his compendium of invented words that aims to fill holes in the English language—to give a name to 'emotions we all feel but don't have a word for'.
- The line was cited by Pope Francis in the 2020 papal encyclical Fratelli tutti, "On fraternity and social friendship", in reference to the COVID-19 pandemic.
- The Franciscan friar and teacher Richard Rohr titled his book on prophetic wisdom The Tears of Things.
- U2 published a song entitled "The Tears of Things" as part of their EP Day of Ash in February 2026.
- Page 419 in Salman Rushdie's The Satanic Verses features the Latin saying; "Sunt lacrimae rerum, as the ex-teacher Sufyan would have said, and Saladin had ample opportunity in the next many days to contemplate the tears in things."

== See also ==
- Pathos
- Mono no aware
- Weltschmerz
- Hinc illae lacrimae
- Pathetic fallacy
