= Non scholae sed vitae =

Latin phrase about learning

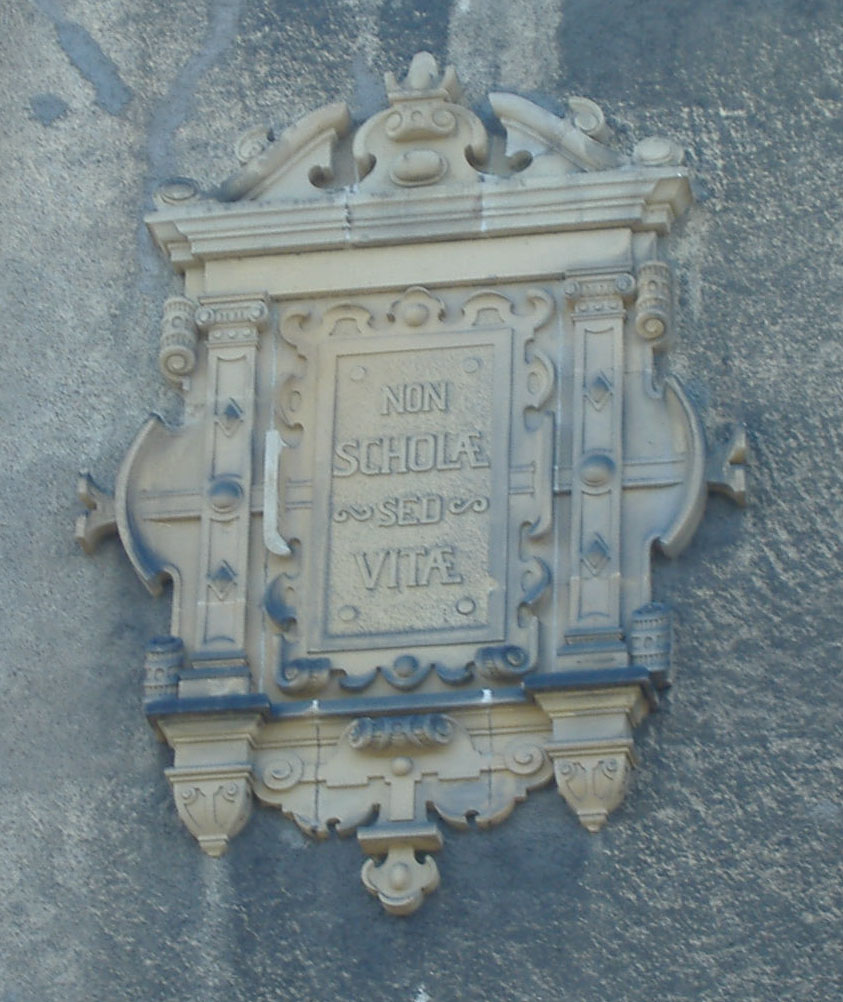
Inscription at the Hermann-Böse-Gymnasium

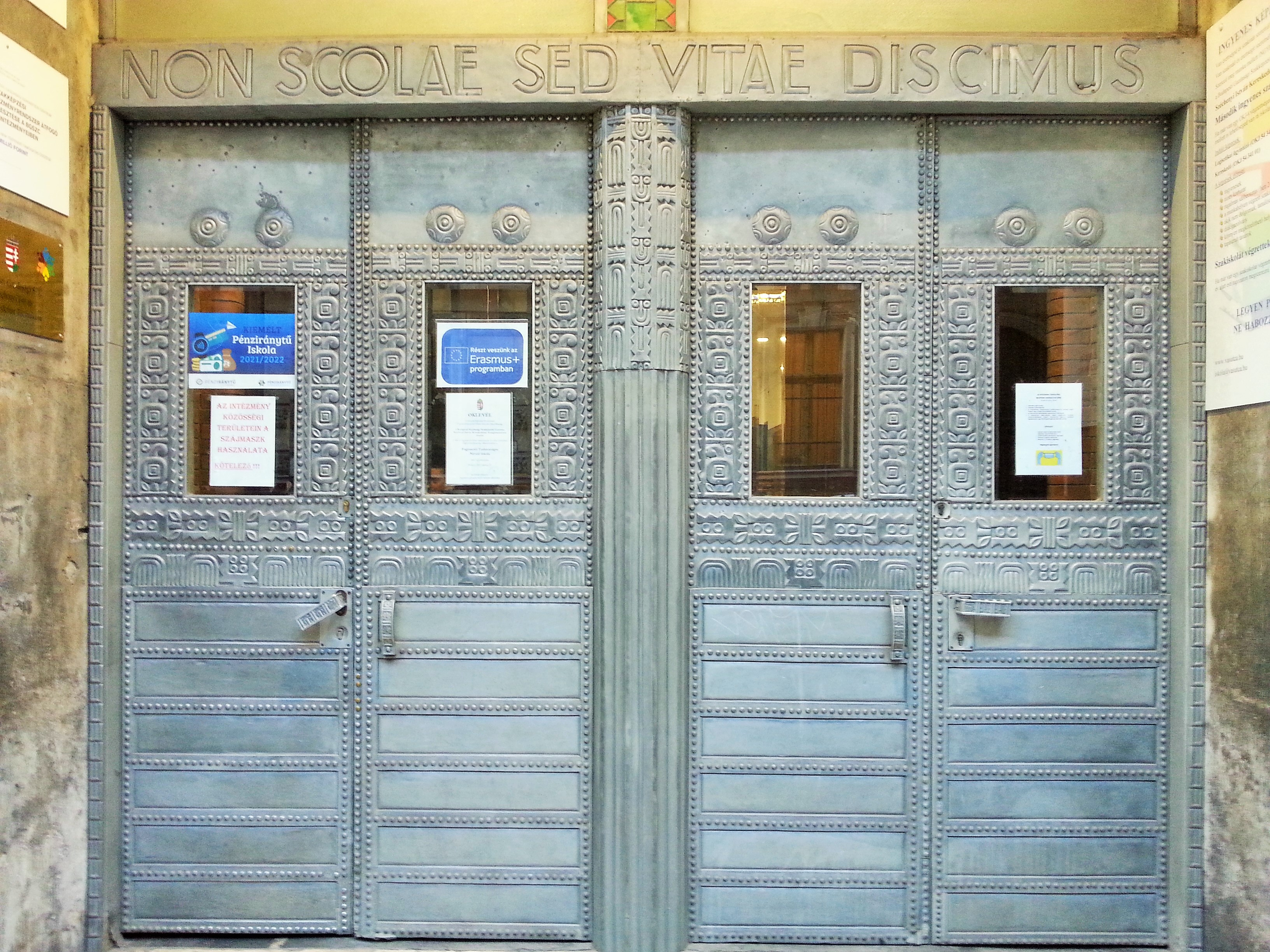
The former Vocational Commercial School on Vas Street, Budapest (built in 1908—1912, architect: Béla Lajta)

Non scholæ sed vitæ is a Latin phrase. Its longer form is non scholæ sed vitæ discimus, which means "We do not learn for school, but for life". The scholae and vitae are first-declension feminine datives of purpose.

The motto is an inversion of the original, which appeared in Seneca the Younger's Moral Letters to Lucilius around AD 65. It appears in an occupatio passage wherein Seneca imagines Lucilius's objections to his arguments. Non vitae sed scholae discimus ("We learn [such literature] not for life but for classtime") was thus already a complaint, the implication being that Lucilius would argue in favor of more practical education and that mastery of literature was overrated. During the early 19th century, this was amended in Austria-Hungary and Germany to non scholae, sed vitae discendum est ("We must learn not for school but for life").
