= Alphius Avitus =

Ancient Roman poet

Alphius Avitus was a Latin poet believed to have flourished during the reigns of the Roman emperors Augustus and Tiberius, that is, the late 1st century BC or early 1st century AD. Many suppose him to be the same person with Alfius Flavus—the precocious pupil of Lucius Cestius Pius and contemporary with Seneca the Elder, who while only a boy was so renowned for his eloquence that crowds flocked to listen to his orations—and with a "Flavius Alfius", who is referred to by Pliny the Elder as an authority for a story about dolphins. This has led some scholars to conjecture that this person's full, correct name may have been "Flavus Alfius Avitus". All this is very uncertain. The ancient grammarian Terentianus records that that Alphius Avitus composed a work about "Illustrious Men", in iambic dimeters, extending to several books; and eight lines are cited by Priscian from the second book, forming a part of the legend of the Faliscan schoolteacher who betrayed his students to Marcus Furius Camillus; besides which, three lines more from the first book are contained in some manuscripts of the same grammarian. These fragments are given in the Latin Anthology of Pieter Burman the Younger.

There is also an "Alpheus Philologus," from whom Priscian adduces five words, and an "Alfius" whose work on the Trojan War is mentioned by Festus.

== See also ==
- Alfia (gens)
