= Lucilius Junior =

Procurator of Sicily during the reign of Roman emperor Nero

Lucilius Junior (fl. 1st century), was the procurator of Sicily during the reign of Nero, a friend and correspondent of Seneca, and the possible author of Aetna, a poem that survives in a corrupt state.

== Life ==
The information about Lucilius comes exclusively from Seneca's writings, especially his Moral Letters, which are addressed to Lucilius. Seneca also dedicated his Naturales Quaestiones and his essay De Providentia to Lucilius. Lucilius seems to have been a native of Campania, and Seneca refers repeatedly to "your beloved Pompeii." At the time Seneca wrote his Letters (c. 65 AD), Lucilius was the procurator (and possibly governor) of Sicily. He was a Roman Knight, a status he had achieved through "persistent work," and he owned a country villa in Ardea, south of Rome. Seneca devotes one of his shorter letters to praising a book Lucilius had written, and elsewhere quotes a few lines of Lucilius' poetry.

== Aetna ==
Aetna is a 644-line poem on the origin of volcanic activity, which has been variously attributed to Virgil, Cornelius Severus, and Manilius.

Its composition has been placed as far back as 44 BC, on the ground that certain works of art, known to have been removed to Rome about that date, are referred to as being at a distance from the city. But as the author appears to have known and made use of the Quaestiones Naturales of Seneca (written c. 65 AD), and no mention is made of the great eruption of Vesuvius (AD 79), the time of its composition seems to lie between these two dates. In favor of the authorship of Lucilius are the facts that he was a friend of Seneca and acquainted with his writings; that he had for some time held the office of imperial procurator of Sicily, and was thus familiar with the locality; and that he was the author of a poem on Sicilian subjects. It is objected that in the 79th letter of Seneca, which is the chief authority on the question, he apparently asks that Lucilius should introduce the hackneyed theme of Aetna merely as an episode in his contemplated poem, not make it the subject of separate treatment. The sources of the Aetna are Posidonius of Apamea, and perhaps the pseudo-Aristotelian De Mundo, while there are many reminiscences of Lucretius. It has come down in a very corrupt state, and its difficulties are increased by the unpoetical nature of the subject, the straining after conciseness, and the obtrusive use of metaphor.

== Editions ==
- J Scaliger (1595)
- F Jacob (1826)
- H A J Munro (1867)
- Moritz Haupt in his edition of Virgil (1873)
- E. Bährens in Poetae latini minores, ii.
- Siegfried Sudhaus (1898)
- Robinson Ellis (1901), containing a bibliography of the subject
