= Hinc illae lacrimae =

Line from a 166 BC Roman play

Hinc illae lacrimae (Latin for "hence those/these tears") is a line from the comedy Andria (166 BC), by the Roman poet Terence. Since the time of the Roman Republic, the phrase has been appropriated as a popular saying or quotation, to be employed when a previously-obscured reason or explanation—for some action(s) or behavior—is recognized; and, especially, when a baser motivation is thereby identified, contra an (initially-assumed) nobler one.

== Background ==
In line 126 (Note: Traditionally: Act 1, scene 1.) of the comedy Andria (commonly known in English as The Woman from Andros), Terence has character Simo comment—to interlocutor Sosias—upon the tears of his (Simo's) son, Pamphilus, at the funeral of a neighbor. At first, Simo assumes that the display is an indication of his son's deep sympathy for the departed, and is pleased that Pamphilus is so evidently noble-hearted; but, upon seeing that the funeral procession includes the deceased's pretty younger sister—and thereby realizing that his son's "grief" is only feigned, as a pretext for becoming closer to the girl—Simo erupts with: Hinc illae lacrimae, haec illast misericordia! ("Hence those tears—this is the reason for that pity!")

== Use in literature ==
The phrase was borrowed as early as 56 BC, by Cicero, in his speech Pro Caelio ("In Defense of Caelius", 1:61), and was used again in 20 BC by Horace, in the first book of his Epistulae ("Letters", 1.19:41). This relatively early appropriation by eminent Roman authors, along with the initial and enduring popularity of the play itself, has led to the phrase becoming a familiar quotation within the Western cultural sphere.

Notable uses of or allusions to the phrase also occur, more recently, in the letters of Karl Marx and Friedrich Engels, and—in a play on the original (Hinc illae irae: "hence those rages"; this version also appears in a letter of Marx's)—in Trollope's 1882 novel Phineas Redux.

== See also ==
- Lacrimae rerum
- Andria (comedy)
- List of Latin phrases
