= Hic Rhodus, hic salta =

Latin phrase

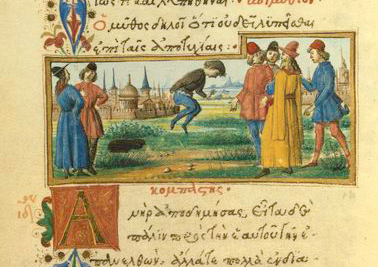
An illustration of the fable in a Medici-era manuscript.

The Latin expression Hic Rhodus, hic salta (lit. transl. Here is Rhodes, jump here!) originated from one of Aesop's Fables, namely The Boasting Traveller. In the original Greek, it is rendered Αὐτοῦ γὰρ καὶ Ῥόδος καὶ πήδημα.

A Man who had travelled in foreign lands, boasted very much, on returning to his own country, of the many wonderful and heroic things he had done in the different places he had visited. Among other things, he said that when he was at Rhodes he had leaped to such a distance that no man of his day could leap anywhere near him—and as to that, there were in Rhodes many persons who saw him do it, and whom he could call as witnesses. One of the bystanders interrupting him, said, "Now, my good man, if this be all true there is no need of witnesses. Suppose this to be Rhodes; and now for your leap."

The listener is challenged to prove his claims directly instead of relying on absent witnesses.

== Usage examples ==
Hic Rhodus, hic saltus. To apprehend what is is the task of philosophy, because what is is reason. As for the individual, every one is a son of his time; so philosophy also is its time apprehended in thoughts. It is just as foolish to fancy that any philosophy can transcend its present world, as that an individual could leap out of his time or jump over Rhodes. If a theory transgresses its time, and builds up a world as it ought to be, it has an existence merely in the unstable element of opinion, which gives room to every wandering fancy. With little change, the above saying would read: Here is the rose, here dance.

— G. W. F. Hegel, Preface to the Philosophy of Right

On the other hand, proletarian revolutions, like those of the nineteenth century, constantly criticize themselves, constantly interrupt themselves in their own course, return to the apparently accomplished, in order to begin anew; they deride with cruel thoroughness the half-measures, weaknesses, and paltriness of their first attempts, seem to throw down their opponents only so the latter may draw new strength from the earth and rise before them again more gigantic than ever, recoil constantly from the indefinite colossalness of their own goals – until a situation is created which makes all turning back impossible, and the conditions themselves call out: Hic Rhodus, hic salta!

— Karl Marx, The 18th Brumaire of Louis Bonaparte

Another, perhaps more famous exemplary usage by Marx is in his Capital: The money-owner, who is as yet only a capitalist in larval form, must buy his commodities at their value, sell them at their value, and yet at the end of the process withdraw more value from circulation than he threw into it at the beginning. His emergence as a butterfly must, and yet must not, take place in the sphere of circulation. These are the conditions of the problem. Hic Rhodus, hic salta!*

== See also ==
- List of Latin phrases
