= Alfia gens =

Ancient Roman family

The gens Alfia was a Roman family, known from the first century BC to the first century AD. The gens is known primarily from three individuals, including a statesman, a rhetorician, and a Latin poet. The cognomina of this family are Flavus, which means "golden" or "yellow", and Avitus, derived from avus, "grandfather". Flavus appears to have been hereditary in the family, while Avitus seems always to have been a personal cognomen.

== Members ==
- Marius Alfius, medix tuticus of Campania and ally of Hannibal
- Gaius Alfius Flavus, tribune of the plebs in 59, and praetor in 54 BC.
- Alfius Flavus, a youthful rhetorician in the time of Augustus and Tiberius, and a teacher of Lucius Annaeus Seneca.
- Alphius Avitus, a Latin poet thought to have lived during the same period as Alfius Flavus, and sometimes supposed to have been the same man.
- Alfius, a historian, whose work on the Trojan War is mentioned by Sextus Pompeius Festus.

== See also ==
- List of Roman gentes
