= Habent sua fata libelli =

Latin expression

The Latin expression Pro captu lectoris habent sua fata libelli (literally, "According to the capabilities of the reader, books have their destiny"), is verse 1286 of De litteris, De syllabis, De Metris by Terentianus Maurus. Libelli is the plural of the Latin word libellus, which is a diminutive of liber ("book"), suggesting the qualification ("little books ...") was actually meant but in fact libellus was used to mean tracts, pamphlets etc.

William Camden used the phrase in the preface to Britannia (1607), the first chorographical survey of the islands of Great Britain and Ireland. The phrase is translated as "Bookes receive their Doome according to the reader's capacity".

The early modern scholar Robert Burton deploys the expression in his The Anatomy of Melancholy:

Our writings are as so many dishes, our readers guests, our books like beauty, that which one admires another rejects; so are we approved as men's fancies are inclined. Pro captu lectoris habent sua fata libelli.

The Latin is often only partially quoted as Habent sua fata libelli and then translated or understood as "Books have their own destinies." By extension, the phrase is understood by Umberto Eco (in The Name of the Rose) as "Books share their fates with their readers". In a talk about book collecting, titled "Unpacking My Library" from Illuminations, Walter Benjamin cites the expression in its short form, noting that the words are often intended as a general statement about books; Benjamin's book collector, by way of contrast, applies them to himself and to the specific copies he collects.

== Example uses ==
- It is quoted by James Joyce in a letter, dated 2 April 1932, to American publisher Bennett Cerf, a letter requested by Cerf concerning the details of the publication of Joyce's novel Ulysses.
- A modified version of the phrase translated as 'booklets and bailiffs have their own fate' appears as part of the footer on the American CAD file hosting website DEFCAD.
- Voltaire uses it in his play “Mérope”.
- Alexandre Dumas père used it in describing the genesis of "Le Capitaine Paul".
- The phrase is used in Marcel Proust's In Search of Lost Time's seventh and final volume, Time Regained (Le temps retrouvé), in reference to a "little brochure" of Brichot's, in which the character brags about having warned against German aggression much prior to World War I.
