= Terentianus =

Latin grammarian

Terentianus, surnamed Maurus (a native of Mauretania), was a Latin grammarian and writer on prosody who flourished probably at the end of the 2nd century AD.

His references to Septimius Serenus and Alphius Avitus, who belonged to the school of "new poets" (poetae neoterici or novelli) of the reign of Hadrian and later, seem to show that he was a near contemporary of those writers. He was the author of a treatise (incomplete) in four books (written in a variety of metres), on letters, syllables, feet and metres, of which considerable use was made by later writers on similar subjects. The most important part of it is that which deals with metres, based on the work of Caesius Bassus, the friend of Persius.

By some authorities Terentianus has been identified with the prefect of Syene mentioned in Martial (i. 86), which would make his date about a century earlier; others, again, who placed Petronius at the end of the 3rd century (a date no longer held), assigned Terentianus to the same period, from his frequent references to that author.

== See also ==
- Habent sua fata libelli
- Trochaic septenarius
