= Andria (comedy) =

Roman comedy by Terence

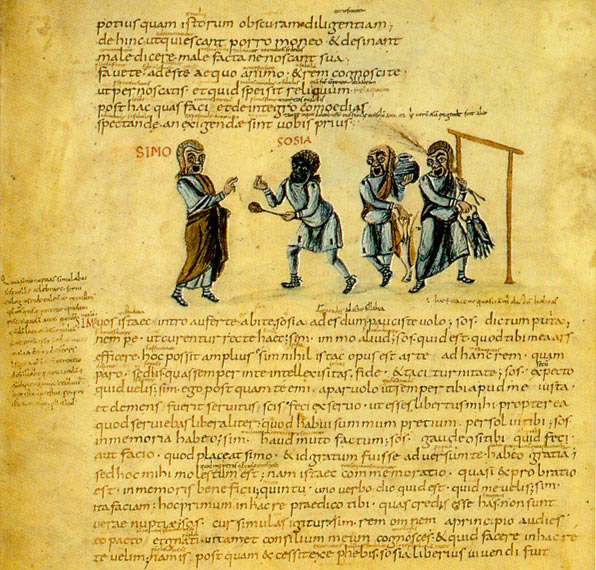
Illustration of Terence's Andria, Act 1, Scene 1, from Codex Vaticanus Latinus 3868, ca. 825 AD

Andria (English: The Woman from Andros) is a Roman comedy adapted by Terence from two Greek plays by Menander, Andria and Perinthia. It was the first play by Terence to be presented publicly, and was performed in 166 BC during the Ludi Megalenses.

By the time of Cicero, roughly a century later (56 BC), the play had evidently become—or, perhaps, was still—well-known, as the orator made use of a line therefrom (hinc illae lacrimae: "hence those/these tears!") in a speech; thirty-six years thereafter (20 BC), the play and the phrase seem to have retained currency enough that Horace could use the latter and expect the allusion to be recognized.

Andria became the first of Terence's plays to be performed post-antiquity, in Florence in 1476, and it was adapted by Machiavelli, whose Andria was likewise the author's first venture into playwriting and was the first of Terence's plays to be translated into English ca. 1520. The second English translation was by the Welsh writer Morris Kyffin in 1588.

== Characters ==
- Simo – Athenian nobleman, father of Pamphilus. Named from simos, "flat-nosed".
- Sosia – Simo's freedman, party to Simo's initial plans but is not seen after the first scene. From sozo, "saved in war".
- Pamphilus – Simo's son, publicly betrothed to Philumena but privately promised to Glycerium. From pan and philos, "a friend to all".
- Davus – Pamphilus' slave. From Dacia, his native country.
- Chremes – Athenian nobleman. Friend and peer of Simo; father of Philumena.
- Charinus – friend of Pamphilus; in love with Philumena. From charis, "grace".
- Byrrhia – Charinus' slave. From purrhos, "red-haired".
- Mysis – Glycerium's slave. From Mysia, her native country.
- Lesbia – an old nurse or midwife who attends Glycerium. From Lesbos, her native country.
- Dromo – presumably also a slave of Simo's; has two short lines, and so is perhaps undeveloped as a character. From dromo, a race.
- Crito – Andrian nobleman; an acquaintance of Glycerium's, and a friend of her father.
- Chrysis – Glycerium's sister, an unseen character who dies before the start of the play. Immigrated to Athens from Andros, and—after a time of eking out a living at the loom—became a harlot.
- Glycerium – an unseen character; beloved of Pamphilus. From glukeros, "sweet".

According to ancient commentator Donatus, the characters of Charinus and Byrrhia were not in the original Menander play, but were copied by Terence from a different Menander play (the Perinthian) so that Philumena would not be left without a husband when Pamphilus married Glycerium. Another part of the Perinthian apparently used by Terence was the dialogue in the first scene, with the substitution of the freedman Sosia for the old man's wife. It seems that the original Andrian of Menander began with a soliloquy.

== Plot ==
Pamphilus has a secret relationship with Glycerium (the eponymous but unseen girl from Andros) and has made her pregnant. Meanwhile, his father has instead arranged for him to marry Chremes' daughter, Philumena; however, following Pamphilus' behaviour at the funeral of Glycerium's sister Chrysis, a prostitute, Chremes withdraws his permission for the union.

Wishing to publicly shame his son for his dalliance with a woman of low birth, Simo pretends that not only will the match still go ahead but that it is scheduled for that same day. Pamphilus, on the advice of the cunning slave Davus, who has learnt of Simo's scheme, accepts the proposal willingly in order to wrong-foot his father. However, the plan goes wrong, since Simo persuades Chremes to again accede to giving his daughter away. This leaves Pamphilus in an awkward position, as he has promised Glycerium's sister Chrysis—on her death-bed, no less—that he would protect Glycerium, who is pregnant with their child. In addition, Pamphilus' friend Charinus is himself in love with the soon-to-be-wed Philumena. Davus faces the three-way wrath of Pamphilus (for tendering bad advice), Charinus (for causing the loss of his beloved), and Simo (for double-dealing between him and his son).

The situation is saved by the fortuitous arrival of a stranger (also from Andros) called Crito. He tells the protagonists that Glycerium was not Chrysis' natural sister: she had been left in her family's care when her uncle Phania was—while searching for his lost brother—shipwrecked on Andros, and there passed away. Chremes realises that Phania was his brother, and, therefore, that he himself is Glycerium's true father. He gives Glycerium's hand in marriage to Pamphilus—which leaves Philumena free to marry Charinus—and absolves Davus from fault.

=== Prologue ===
The poet defends himself against his critics who have accused him of adding parts of Menander's play The Perinthian Girl to his Andrian Girl.

=== Act one ===
Simo tells his freedman Sosia that the nuptials he is preparing for his son Pamphilus are a sham. When Sosia enquires as to the purpose of the sham, Simo tells him of Pamphilus' shameful secret attachment to Glycerium, the sister of a harlot. Chremes had previously been so impressed by Pamphilus' moderate and upright behaviour that he had offered his daughter unprompted; but, following the uncovering of the affair between Pamphilus and Glycerium at Chrysis' funeral, he has withdrawn his offer. Simo is outraged that Pamphilus does not feel abashed from his (Simo's) private admonition of Pamphilus' behaviour, and so Simo is continuing with the appearance of the nuptials so that Pamphilus will be seen as publicly defying his father; he also hopes that he might draw out the roguish plotting of Pamphilus' slave, Davus.

Davus comes out talking to himself, and is overheard by Simo. Having made himself known, he is told by Simo to ensure that the nuptials go to plan, as any hint that Davus' scheming had caused the wedding's cancellation will result in Davus being severely punished. After Simo's departure, Davus vows to undermine Simo's plan. He also reveals that in order to curry favour with Simo, Glycerium has concocted a story that she is a free-born citizen of Athens who was shipwrecked as a child on Andros and is thus not of base birth; Davus, though, heaps scorn on this idea.

Glycerium is soon to give birth. Mysis leaves her mistress' house to make some preparations for this when she overhears Pamphilus bemoaning the fact that his marriage to Philumena is still proceeding. Mysis reveals herself to him. Pamphilus earnestly repeats that he will not desert Glycerium. Mysis leaves to find a midwife.

=== Act two ===
Charinus and Byrrhia speak. Byrrhia confirms the rumour that Pamphilus is still proceeding with the marriage to Philumena. Charinus declares his love of Philumena; and, as he is unsure why Pamphilus is going ahead with the match, he vows to go and beg him at least to delay. Byrrhia warns him not to do this, as it might appear to Pamphilus that Charinus is effect telling him that he will cuckold him at the first opportunity.

Charinus catches up with Pamphilus and begs him to break off, or—failing that—delay, the wedding. Pamphilus tells him that he would love nothing better than acquiesce to this request, and is endeavouring to bring about the wedding's termination. Charinus is relieved by this. He dismisses Byrrhia for his poor counsel. Davus approaches them and they surmise from his happy disposition that Davus is unaware of their fated heartbreak. Davus tells them that in fact the planned nuptials are a ruse and that he has checked Chremes' house and there is no sign of preparations. Charinus leaves happy that he will have his beloved Philumena.

Davus counsels Pamphilus to accept Simo's wish to marry. This will cause the match to be publicly ended by Chremes. As a disclosed libertine Simo will be willing to let him marry Glycerium rather than no one at all. Pamphilus agrees but asks Davus to ensure his father does not discover that he has agreed to bring up Glycerium's child.

Simo enters to set his trap. Byrrhia enters and hides himself as he is under orders to watch Pamphilus' movements in regard to Philumena. Simo tells Pamphilus he must marry today. Pamphilus surprises him by agreeing. Byrrhia believes that Pamphilus is betraying his master.

Simo collars Davus and voices his suspicions of Pamphilus' volte face. Davus parries these queries and the accusation that Davus is somehow plotting against him. Davus says that any unhappiness Simo might have detected was due to Simo's mean expense on the celebrations.

=== Act three ===
Simo and Davus overhear Mysis and Lesbia, who in the course of their conversation reveal that Pamphilus has made a pledge to support Glycerium's child. Simo believes that this is a ruse concocted by his son to anger Chremes and thereby end his wedding to Philumena. While they are talking, they hear a cry while Glycerium gives birth to a son.

Simo accuses Davus of advising his master in this deception. Davus denies this. To avoid suspicion as to his true plans, Davus tells Simo this is a plan by Glycerium to keep the attentions of his son and the next move of Glyceium's servants will be to place the new-born son on Simo's doorstep so as to prevent the wedding.

Simo meets Chremes in the street. Chremes asks why there is a rumour about town that their children will still be wed. Simo implores Chremes to reagree to the match. He reveals that, as Davus has said, Glycerium is faking a birth in order to get back together with Pamphilus. Believing Simo appraisal of the situation Chremes agrees. Simo meets Davus and thanks him for helping with his plans. He 'reveals' the nuptials had been a sham and says if they now go ahead it is wholly due to Davus' good advice. Davus privately berates himself. Pamphilus searches for Davus seeking to imprison or kill him for putting him in an intractable situation. Davus implores him to let him redeem himself and promises to come up with something to stop the wedding, but no plan comes to mind.

=== Act four ===
Charinus on hearing that the wedding will proceed believes that his friend has betrayed him taking Philumena only because he had revealed his love of the girl. He comes on Davus and Pamphilus and accuses his friend. Pamphilus says that it was not his doing but down to the plotting of Davus. Facing a two-time wrath Davus doubles his promise that, somehow, he will extricate Pamphilus from the union. Mysis enters telling Pamphilus that Glycerium needs his presence. Davus tells Charinus that he has a plan but there may not be enough time to pull it off, but he should go and wait in his house.

Davus bids Mysis to stay a moment, and returns with the child. He tells her to place it on the doorstep of Simo's household. Davus retires into the background as Chremes comes onto the scene, and then reappears after Chremes has seen what Mysis was doing. Chremes hides himself not realising that Davus knows he is present. Davus berates a confused Mysis for her actions, saying that it would be terrible if Chremes had come on the scene and not him. Chremes reveals himself and says the wedding is off.

Crito arrives in Athens, and on learning of Chrysis' death berates his ill fortune because, as Glycerium is in reality an orphan, he is Chrysis' closest relative and will need to take a case to law to claim her estate ahead of Glycerium who will no doubt be defended by some gallant protector.

=== Act five ===
Chremes berates Simo for enticing him into giving permission for the wedding again. Simo mollifies his rage saying what he saw was a ruse orchestrated by Glycerium and that Davus had even warned him beforehand that this would be attempted in order to break the wedding off. They then spy Davus exiting Glycerium's house. They ask him why he was there. Davus replies that he was attending Pamphilus and that there is news that claims Glycerium is an Athenian citizen. Not believing him Simo has Davus arrested. Pamphilus arrives and Simo berates him for breaking his word. Pamphilus responds that he will indeed break his word but that his father ought to listen to Crito's story before he scolds him. Crito tells all present that Glycerium is the niece of an Athenian nobleman shipwrecked on Andros while searching for his brother. Chremes reveals that he was that brother and, approving of the match, gives a dowry of ten talents.

== Metrical structure ==
The majority (98%) of lines in the Andria consist of the following metres:

- iambic senarii (ia6): 52% (this metre was unaccompanied, while the others were sung)
- trochaic septenarii (tr7): 22%
- iambic octonarii (ia8): 18%
- iambic septenarii (ia7): 4%
- cretic quaternarii (cr4): 1%
- trochaic octonarii (tr8): 0.7%

Many Roman comedies, such as Terence's Phormio, have a clear metrical structure, with sections generally in the order A = iambic senarii, B = other metres, C = trochaic septenarii. Andria does not follow this scheme exactly. In several places, the iambic senarii are preceded not by trochaic septenarii, but by iambic octonarii (and, once, by an iambic septenarius). There are no fewer than 11 polymetric passages with different metres (ia8, ia4, tr7, tr8, tr4) following each other in rapid succession. (Andria has 90 changes of metre, which is more than any other Terence play.)

The Andria also differs from Plautus's plays by its unusually heavy use of the iambic octonarius metre. Another unusual feature is that it contains a short passage (481–484) in bacchiac quaternarii, and another passage (626–639) in various cretic metres, which Terence otherwise mostly avoided.

The different metres are used for different purposes, reflecting the emotional content of the lines. The iambic senarii passages are used for narrative and giving background information; they are also used five times in short sections to emphasise a point or give important information. Trochaic septenarii move the plot forward. Iambic octonarii are common when characters express their anxieties. Iambic septenarii—the so-called "metre of love"—are used especially in passages singing about love and marriage. The bacchiac metre, used briefly when the midwife Lesbia comes out of the house, is a solemn metre often sung by women characters.

Compared with a Plautus play, such as Epidicus, Terence's Andria has many more changes of metre. Thus the metrical scheme is:

(1) Davus is warned not to interfere: ABAB, ABC
(2) Davus suggests a plan: BAB, B(A)C
(3) Davus carries out his plan: ABABC
(4) Davus's plan goes wrong: ABAB, BBBC, BC, BABBBB
(5) Davus escapes punishment: ACB, AC, BC

There is a similarity of plot between the two, however: in both, a wily slave tricks his master and his master's friend; in both, the plan goes badly wrong, but the slave escapes punishment in the nick of time by a lucky chance. In the end, in both plays, the two old men are placated, a long-lost daughter is found, and the young man of the house gets to keep his girlfriend.

=== Davus is warned not to interfere ===
==== Prologue ====
- Prologue (1–27): ia6 (27 lines)

The poet defends himself against his critics.

==== The wedding preparations ====
- Act 1.1 (28–174): ia6 (147 lines)

Simo arrives with his freedman Sosia and some slaves carrying provisions. Simo sends the slaves inside, and then reveals to Sosia that the wedding which is being prepared for his son Pamphilus is a pretence. He explains that three years previously a woman had come to the neighbourhood from the island of Andros, and she had had various lovers. When she died, it became obvious that Pamphilus had a relationship with the dead girl's sister, whereupon Simo's friend Chremes, whose daughter Pamphilus was to marry, had cancelled the engagement. Now Simo says that by pretending to go ahead with the wedding he hopes to force Pamphilus to show his disobedience, and also to thwart any tricks that might be played by his wily slave Davus.

- Act 1.2 (175–195): mixed metres (mostly ia8) (20 lines)

Davus comes out talking to himself; he suspects Simo is up to something. Simo overhears him and urges him to cooperate with Pamphilus's wedding plans; but Davus pretends not to understand ("I am Davus, not Oedipus!")

- Act 1.2 (196–198): ia6 (3 lines)

Finally Simo threatens plainly that if Davus does anything to prevent the wedding...

- Act 1.2–1.3 (199–214): ia8 (16 lines)

...he will be severely punished. Simo goes inside; Davus expresses his anxiety to the audience.

==== Glycerium's pregnancy ====
- Act 1.3 (215–224): ia6 (10 lines)

Davus explains to the audience that Pamphilus' girlfriend is pregnant, and that Pamphilus has concocted a story of how she is really a freeborn woman.

- Act 1.3 (225–228): ia8, ia6, ia8 (3 lines)

But he says that himself doesn't believe this story. He decides to go to the forum to look for Pamphilus.

- Act 1.4 (228–233): tr7 (6 lines)

Meanwhile a slave girl, Mysis, comes out from next door. It appears from her words to someone inside that she has been sent to fetch a midwife called Lesbia.

=== Davus suggests a plan ===
==== Pamphilus and Mysis's anxieties ====
- Act 1.4–1.5 (234–269): mixed iambic-trochaic (mostly ia8 and tr7) (36 lines)

Suddenly Mysis notices Pamphilus approaching. While Mysis listens, Pamphilus expresses his distress over the situation that he faces. Mysis asks him anxiously if he will remain loyal to Glycerium.

- Act 1.5 (270–298): ia6 (29 lines)

Pamphilus narrates how Glycerium's sister, on her deathbed, made him promise to protect Glycerium, which he assures Mysis he will always do.

- Act 1.5 (299–300), Act 2.1: ia7 (2 lines)

Mysis tells Pamphilus she is going to fetch the midwife. Pamphilus begs her not to tell Glycerium about the wedding.

==== Charinus's anxieties ====
- Act 2.1 (301–317): mixed iambic and trochaic (17 lines)

Meanwhile Pamphilus's friend Charinus arrives with his slave Byrria. He expresses his anxieties about the imminent wedding (ia8). Byrria tries to make him forget it (tr8, tr7).

- Act 2.1 (318): ia6 (1 line)

Charinus sees Pamphilus and greets him.

- Act 2.1 (319–383), 2.2: tr7 (65 lines)

Charinus informs Pamphilus that he is love with Chremes' daughter, and he begs Pamphilus to put off or at least postpone the wedding. Pamphilus says he would be very pleased to do so if some way could be found. At this point Charinus sends Byrria away, since he is not being helpful.
– Davus comes running up with news. He tells the two young men that the wedding is not going to happen after all; he has found this out after going to Chremes's house. He sends Charinus off to go and try to win over Chremes.
– Davus now tells Pamphilus that his father is looking for an excuse to put the blame on Pamphilus, and then plans to drive Glycerium out of the city. He shocks Pamphilus by advising him that he must agree to the wedding.

=== Davus carries out the plan ===
- Act 2.3 (384–393): ia6 (10 lines)

Pamphilus refuses completely. Davus explains his reasoning. There is no danger that Chremes will agree to the wedding.

- Act 2.3 (394–403): ia8 (10 lines)

Davus again urges Pamphilus to agree to marry; in this way Pamphilus will deflect his father's anger and they will buy some time. Pamphilus says he hopes his father doesn't find out about the baby since he has promised to bring it up.

- Act 2.4, 2.5, 3.1 (404–480): ia6 (77 lines)

Pamphilus's father Simo now arrives, secretly followed by Charinus's slave Byrria, who has been sent by his master to spy on Pamphilus. When Simo asks Pamphilus if he is ready to marry, to Simo's surprise Pamphilus agrees at once. Byrria is horrified at this and departs to tell Charinus. Pamphilus also departs.
– Simo is sure that Davus is playing a trick, but Davus assures him that Pamphilus is very happy about the wedding. He adds that Pamphilus thinks that not enough money is being spent on the preparations and goads Simo by cheekily saying that he thinks Pamphilus is right.
– Meanwhile Glycerium's slave Mysis approaches with the midwife, Lesbia. Simo and Davus overhear Mysis saying that the young man has promised to bring the baby up. The two women go into Glycerium's house. Shortly afterwards Simo and Davus hear Glycerium's cries as she gives birth. Simo is even more enraged, assuming that Glycerium is only pretending to have a baby in order to trap Pamphilus.

- Act 3.2 (481–509): bacchiac (4 lines) + various iambic metres (25 lines)

The midwife Lesbia comes out of the house, calling instructions to someone inside (ba4). She says she'll be back soon (ia4cat). She declares that a fine baby boy has been born (ia6) and prays it will survive (ia8).
– Simo, overhearing this, is highly suspicious that she is calling out instructions from the street. He assumes that Davus must have put them up to it to trick him (ia8). He simply doesn't believe that there has been a birth (ia6). Davus protests, but Simo says he knows him well (ia8); he is quite sure that no birth has taken place (ia7). Davus tells him that the truth will be obvious when the baby is laid before Simo's door (ia8).

- Act 3.2 (510–523): tr7 (7 lines), tr4cat (1 line), tr7 (6 lines)

Davus eventually placates Simo by agreeing that the whole business is indeed highly suspicious, and he encourages him to proceed with the wedding. Simo is satisfied and sends Davus inside to help with the preparations.

=== Davus's plan goes wrong ===
==== Simo meets Chremes ====
- Act 3.2 (524–532): ia6 (9 lines)

Pleased that he hasn't fallen for any trickery, Simo decides to ask Chremes to change his mind about the wedding.

- Act 3.3 (533–537): ia8 (4 lines) + ia4 (1 line)

Just at that moment Chremes appears, anxious to know the meaning of the rumours that the wedding is going ahead.

- Act 3.3 (538–574): ia6 (37 lines)

Simo entreats Chremes to change his mind. Chremes seems reluctant.

- Act 3.3 (575–581): ia7 (7 lines)

Simo says his slave Davus will bear witness that Pamphilus is now keen to get married. At that moment Davus comes out, saying it is time for the bride to be sent for.

==== Pamphilus's distress ====
- Act 3.3 (582–604): ia8 (23 lines)

Simo, feeling he can now trust Davus, reveals to him that the wedding preparation was only a sham. Davus pretends to be surprised. Chremes, convinced, says he agrees to the wedding, and he goes off to inform the bride. Meanwhile Simo goes inside to inform Pamphilus of the news.
– Left alone, Davus pours out his anxieties to the audience; he's really in trouble now that his plan has gone completely wrong.

- Act 3.4 (605–609): tr4cat, tr7, tr8, tr7 (5 lines)

Suddenly he sees Pamphilus coming out. Pamphilus is furious with Davus at the latest turn of events.

- Act 3.4 (610–620): ia8 (11 lines)

Pamphilus blames himself for his stupidity and wonders what he will tell his father. He sees Davus and chides him angrily for his bad advice. Davus assures Pamphilus that he will somehow get him out of the situation.

- Act 3.4 (621–624): tr7 (4 lines)

Pamphilus is frustrated that he cannot yet give Davus the punishment he deserves.

==== Charinus's anger ====
- Act 4.1 (625–642): mixed metres (mostly cretic) (21 lines)

Charinus enters, singing of his distress at having been betrayed by Pamphilus.

- Act 4.1 (643–649): tr7 (7 lines)

Charinus angrily accuses Pamphilus of breaking his word.

==== Pamphilus's excuses ====
- Act 4.1 (650–654): ia8 (5 lines)

Pamphilus pleads that it is Davus's fault.

- Act 4.1 (655–662): ia6 (8 lines)

Pamphilus excuses himself again, saying that it is not his fault.

- Act 4.1 (663–664): ia8 (2 lines)

Charinus asks who is at fault, and Pamphilus indicates Davus.

- Act 4.1 (665–681): ia6 (17 lines)

When Charinus questions Davus, he admits it is true and promises to make amends.

- Act 4.1 (682–683): ia8 (2 lines)

Suddenly they hear Glycerium's door opening.

- Act 4.2 (684–715): ia7 (32 lines)

Mysis comes out. She says that Glycerium has heard about the wedding and is anxious to see Pamphilus. Pamphilus assures her that he will never be unfaithful to Glycerium. Davus says he has another plan. Pamphilus goes in to see Glycerium. Charinus, after begging Davus to help him, goes home. Then Davus also enters Glycerium's house while Mysis waits outside.

=== Davus escapes punishment ===
==== Chremes finds the baby ====
- Act 4.3–4.5 (716–819): ia6 (104 lines)

Soon Davus comes out carrying a baby and instructs Mysis to lay it at Simo's door. Suddenly he sees Chremes coming and realises that he will have to change his plan.
– Chremes arrives and is surprised to see the baby. Before Mysis can explain, Davus appears, acting as if he has just come from the market. Pretending not to notice Chremes, he asks Mysis to speak aloud where the baby is from. She says that it is Pamphilus's child. Davus pretends to disbelieve her and protests that he saw the baby being secretly carried into the house the previous evening. Then he says that he has heard a rumour that the mother is really a citizen of Athens. Chremes now comes forward and says he has heard everything. He goes inside Simo's house to speak to him. Davus meanwhile explains to Mysis what has happened.
– At this moment, a stranger, Crito, arrives looking for Glycerium's sister Chrysis. Mysis recognises him and informs him that Chrysis is deceased. Crito says that if he were to bring a legal case to claim Chrysis's property it would have little chance of success. They go into the house, followed by Davus.

- Act 5.1–5.2 (820–860): tr7 (41 lines)

Chremes and Simo come out. Chremes is telling Simo that the marriage is now impossible. He adds that it is rumoured that Glycerium is a citizen of Athens.
– Davus now comes out. Questioned by Simo, he says that Pamphilus is in Glycerium's house. Moreover a stranger has arrived claiming that she is an Athenian citizen.

- Act 5.2 (861–865): ia8 (3 lines), tr7 (1 line), ia8 (1 line)

Simo, for whom this is the last straw, calls for his slave Dromo to seize Davus, take him indoors and bind him hand and foot.

==== Simo interrogates Pamphilus and Crito ====
- Act 5.1–5.2 (866–895): ia6 (30 lines)

Simo calls Pamphilus to come out from Glycerium's house. He questions Pamphilus angrily about the man who is testifying that Glycerium is a citizen, accusing Pamphilus of having concocted the story. In his fury he is ready to disown Pamphilus as his son.

- Act 5.2–5.3 (896–928): tr7 (33 lines)

Pamphilus begs to be allowed to fetch Crito as a witness. Crito comes out and Chremes recognises him. Simo, paying no attention, questions Crito angrily. Crito tells the story of how Glycerium and her father were shipwrecked on Andros when she was a little girl and were given hospitality by Chrysis's father.

==== Chremes recognises his daughter ====
- Act 5.3–5.4 (929–957): ia8 (29 lines)

When he hears the father's name Chremes suddenly realises that Glycerium's father was his own brother. Pamphilus clinches the matter by mentioning the name which Glycerium told him she had as a little girl. Chremes is reconciled to the marriage and declares that he will give her a dowry of ten talents. He and Crito go into Glycerium's house. Simo suggests that Pamphilus should give the order for Glycerium to be fetched to the house. Pamphilus, hearing that Davus has been tied up, begs his father to untie him. – Meanwhile Charinus arrives unnoticed.

- Act 5.5–5.6 (958–981): tr7 (24 lines)

Charinus is puzzled to find Pamphilus rejoicing; he listens while Davus comes out and Pamphilus tells him the good news. Pamphilus then sees Charinus and takes him inside Glycerium's house to meet Chremes. He orders Davus to arrange for the bride to be summoned to his home.

== Quotes ==
• "Moderation in all things." – Sosia (1.1)

• "Compliance raises friends, and truth breeds hate." – Sosia (1.1)

• "Hinc illae lacrimae!" (Latin; in English, "hence [the reason for] those/these tears!") – Simo (1.1.126)

• "All who like mistresses dislike the thought of marriage." – Simo (1.2)

• "Charity begins at home." – Charinus (4.1)

== Cultural impact ==
Thornton Wilder, an American writer, wrote The Woman of Andros, a novel based on Terence's Andria, which presents a fable about the emptiness of the classical world on the brink of profound changes provoked by the birth of Jesus.

== Editions ==
- Goldberg, Sander M. (2022). Terence: Andria. Cambridge: Cambridge University Press. ISBN 9781009200653.
