= Battle of Cumae (215 BC) =

The Battle of Hamae, 215 BC

The battle of Cumae in 215 BC was a defensive victory for the Romans and the city of Cumae against aggression from Capua and its ally, Carthage, during the Second Punic War. It is described in Livy's Ab Urbe Condita, book 23.

Hannibal attacks Cumae, 215 BC

The Capuans were the driving force in the confrontation over Cumae that began early in 215. When the Cumaeans refused their encouragement to rebel against Rome, the Capuans prepared an ambush for the Cumaean contingent travelling to a religious festival at Hamae. The Cumaeans, suspecting a ruse, warned the Roman commander Tiberius Sempronius Gracchus based at Sinuessa. Gracchus surprised the Capuans and inflicted a heavy defeat on them. Livy reports over 2,000 dead. Gracchus then retreated to the safety of Cumae. The Carthaginian commander, Hannibal, who had not been apprised of the Capuans' intentions, marched from his winter camp to secure the battlefield and bring the wonded back to Capua.

The next day, at the urging of his allies, Hannibal marched on Cumae with "all the siege equipment for attacking a city", in Livy's words, including a siege tower. The Romans beat him off and he returned to his winter camp.
