= Nihil admirari =

Latin phrase

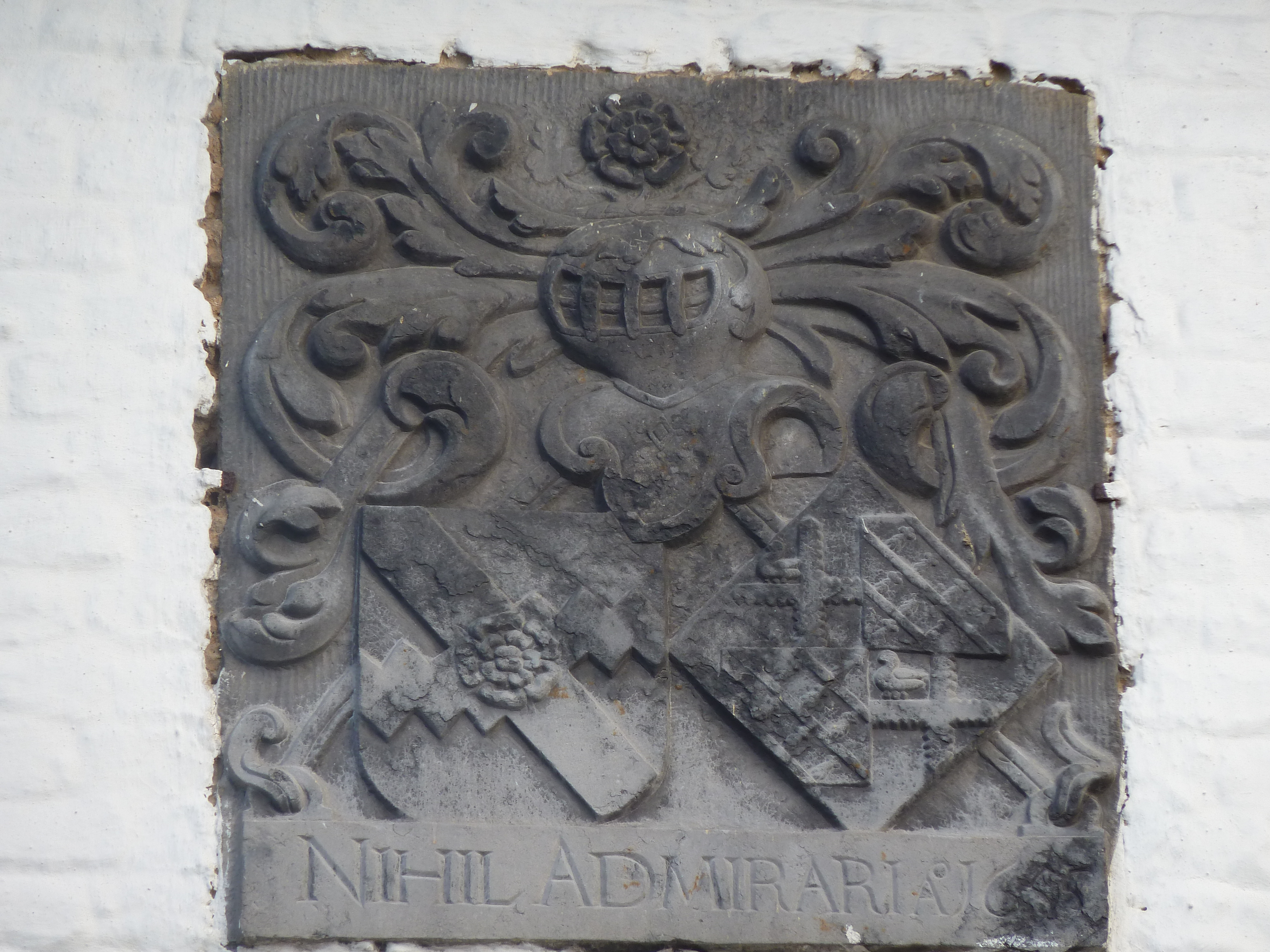
Gable stone of 1655 in Bemelen, Netherlands

Nihil admirari (or Nil admirari) is a Latin phrase. It means "to be surprised by nothing", or in an imperative sense, "let nothing astonish you".

== Origin ==
Marcus Tullius Cicero argues that real sapience consists of preparing oneself for all possible incidents and not being surprised by anything, using as an example Anaxagoras, who, when informed about the death of his son, said, "Sciebam me genuisse mortalem" (I knew that I begot a mortal). Horace and Seneca refer to similar occurrences and admired such moral fortitude.

"Marvel at nothing"—that is perhaps the one and only thing that can make a man happy and keep him so.

Nietzsche wrote that in this proposition the ancient philosopher "sees the whole of philosophy", opposing it to Schopenhauer's "admirari id est philosophari" (to marvel is to philosophize).
