= Epistulae Morales ad Lucilium =

Collection of letters by Seneca

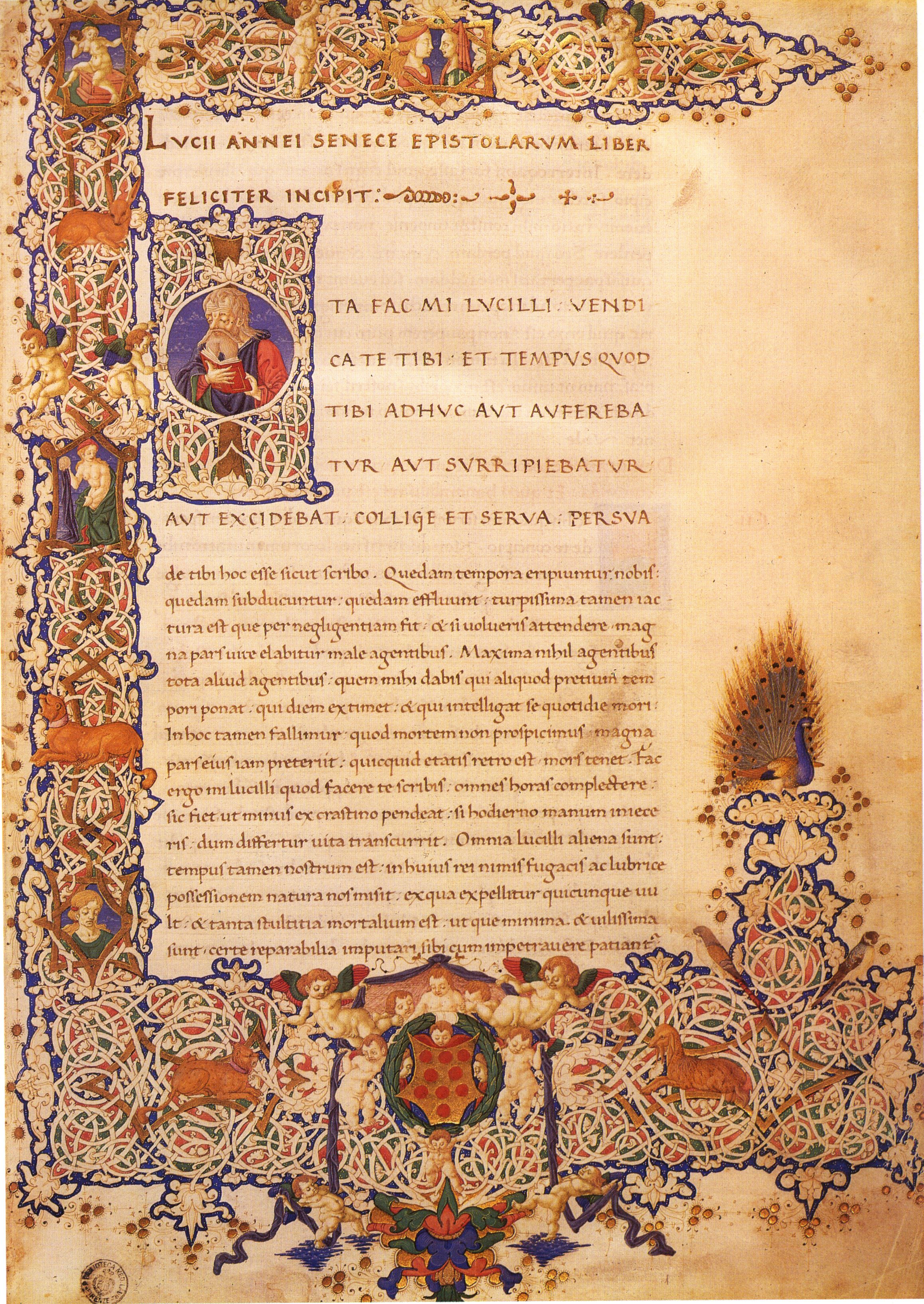
- 15th-century illuminated manuscript, Laurentian Library
- Author: Seneca
- Language: Latin
- Subject: Ethics
- Genre: Philosophy
- Publication date: c. 65 AD
- Publication place: Ancient Rome
- Text: Epistulae Morales ad Lucilium at Wikisource

Epistulae Morales ad Lucilium (Latin for "Moral Letters to Lucilius"), also known as the Moral Epistles and Letters from a Stoic, is a letter collection of 124 extant letters that Seneca the Younger wrote at the end of his life, during his retirement, after he had worked for the Emperor Nero for more than ten years. They are addressed to Lucilius Junior, the then procurator of Sicily, who is known only through Seneca's writings.

The letters often begin with an observation on daily life, and then proceed to an issue or principle abstracted from that observation. The result is like a diary, or handbook of philosophical meditations. The letters focus on many traditional themes of Stoic philosophy such as the contempt of death, the stout-heartedness of the sage, and virtue as the supreme good.

== Writing ==
Scholars generally agree that the letters are arranged in the order in which Seneca wrote them. The 124 letters are arranged in twenty manuscript volumes, but the collection is not complete. Aulus Gellius (mid-2nd century) quotes an extract from the "twenty-second book", so some letters are missing. However since the fire of Lyon mentioned in letter 91 took place less than a year before Seneca's death (in spring 65) the number of missing letters is not thought to be very high.

Collectively the letters constitute Seneca's longest work. Although addressed to Lucilius, the letters take the form of open letters, and are clearly written with a wider readership in mind, in the epistolary genre well-known in Seneca's time. Seneca refers to Cicero's letters to Atticus and the letters of Epicurus, and he was probably familiar with the letters of Plato and the epistles of Horace. However, despite the careful literary crafting, there is no obvious reason to doubt that they are real letters. Seneca often says that he is writing in response to a letter from Lucilius, although there is unlikely to have been a strict back-and-forth exchange of letters. Even if both writers had access to the imperial mail service, a letter from central Italy to Sicily would have taken four to eight days to travel. In many instances Seneca probably composed letters as a new subject occurred to him. The letters tend to become longer over time, interspersed with some short ones, and the later letters focus increasingly on theoretical questions.

=== Dating ===
The Letters were written in the last two or three years of Seneca's life. In letter 8, Seneca alludes to his retirement from public life, which is thought (by reference to Tacitus Annals xiv. 52–56) to have been around spring of the year 62. Letter 18 was written in December, in the run-up to the Saturnalia. Letter 23 refers to a cold spring, presumably in 63 AD. Letter 67 refers to the end of a cold spring and is thought (to allow forty-three intervening letters) to have been written the following year. Letter 91 refers to the great fire of Lugdunum (Lyon) that took place in the late summer of 64. Letter 122 refers to the shrinking daylight hours of autumn. Other chronologies are possible – in particular if letters 23 and 67 refer to the same spring, that can reduce the timescale by a full year.

== Content ==
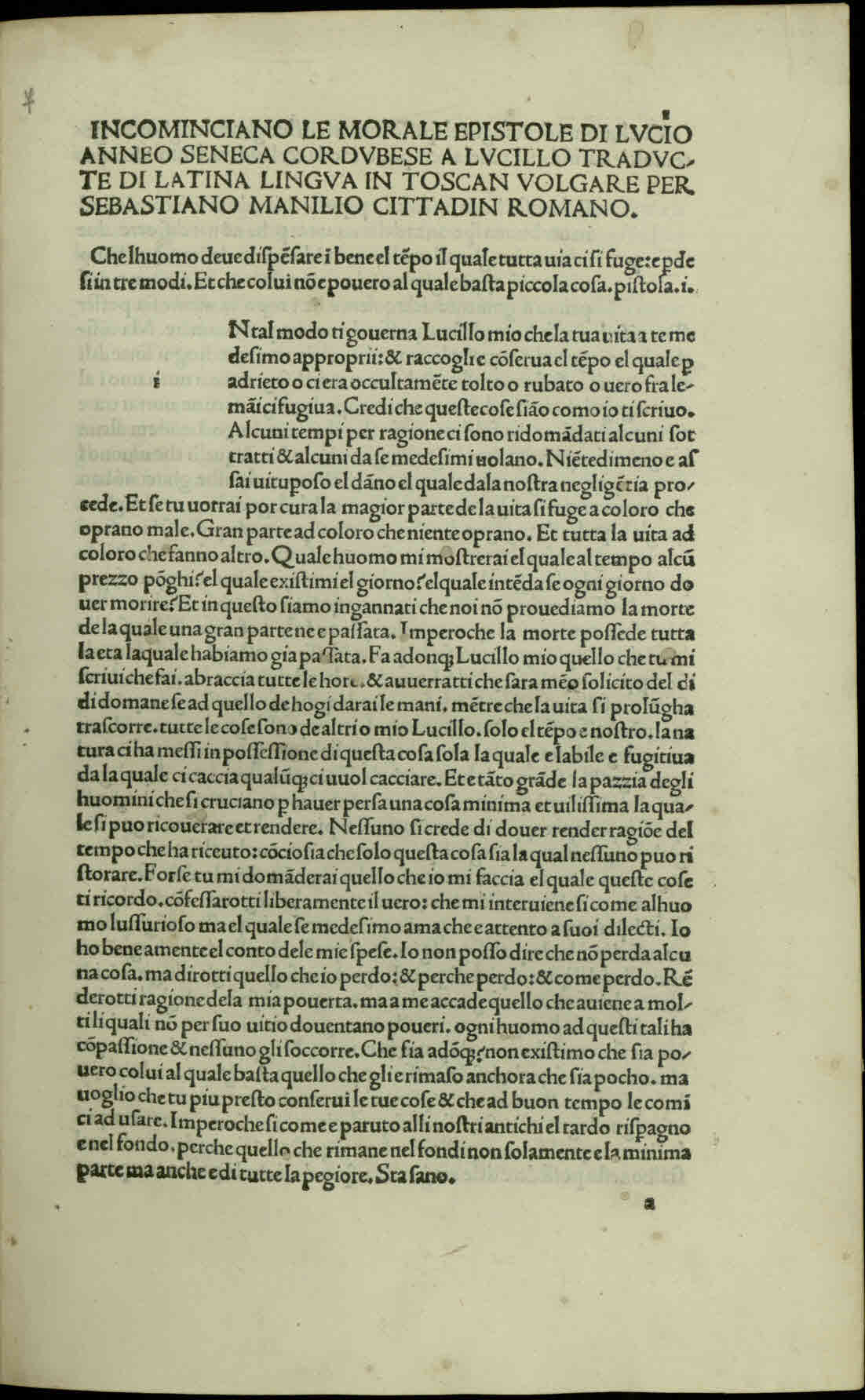
Incipit page of the first printed edition of the Epistles in the "Tuscan" i.e. Italian version (1494).

The letters all start with the phrase "Seneca Lucilio suo salutem" ("Seneca greets his Lucilius") and end with the word "Vale" ("Farewell"). In these letters, Seneca gives Lucilius advice on how to become a more devoted Stoic. Some of the letters include "On Noise" and "Asthma". Others include letters on "the influence of the masses" and "how to deal with one's slaves" (Letter 47). Although they deal with Seneca's personal style of Stoic philosophy, they also give valuable insights into daily life in ancient Rome.

The letters tend to open with an observation of a quotidian incident, which is then abstracted to a far wider exploration of an issue or principle. In letter 7, for instance, Seneca reports a chance visit to an arena gladiatorial combat, fought to the death; he then questions the morality and ethics of such a spectacle, in what is the first extant record of a pre-Christian writer expressing moral qualms on the matter.

Seneca frequently quotes Latin poets, especially Virgil, but also Ovid, Horace, and Lucretius. Seneca also quotes Publilius Syrus, such as during the eighth letter, "On the Philosopher's Seclusion".

== Themes ==
Seneca's letters focus on the inner life and the joy that comes from wisdom. He emphasizes the Stoic theme that virtue is the only true good and vice the only true evil. He repeatedly refers to the brevity of life and the fleeting passage of time.

Seneca's first letter to Lucius, discussing fleeting nature and the value of time, in Latin with English subtitles.

Underlying a large number of the letters is a concern with death on the one hand (a central topic of Stoic philosophy, and one embodied in Seneca's observation that we are "dying every day") and suicide on the other, a key consideration given Seneca's deteriorating political position and the Emperor's common use of forced suicide as a method of covert execution.

Early letters often conclude with a maxim to meditate on, although this strategy is over by the thirtieth letter. Such maxims are typically drawn from Epicurus, but Seneca regards this as a beginner's technique. In letter 33 he stresses that the student must begin to make well-reasoned judgements independently.

== Language and style ==
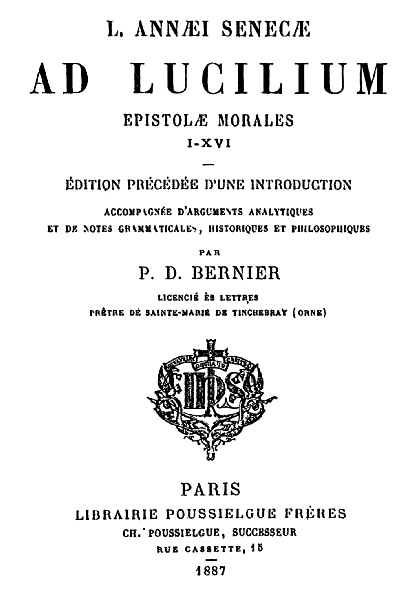
French edition, 1887

The language and style of the letters is quite varied, and this reflects the fact that they are a mixture of private conversation and literary fiction. As an example, there is a mix of different vocabulary, incorporating technical terms (in fields such as medicine, law and navigation) as well as colloquial terms and philosophical ones. Seneca also uses a range of devices for particular effects, such as ironic parataxis, hypotactic periods, direct speech interventions and rhetorical techniques such as alliterations, chiasmus, polyptoton, paradoxes, antitheses, oxymoron, etymological figures and so forth. In addition there are neologisms and hapax legomena.

== Later history ==
=== Manuscripts ===
The oldest manuscripts of the letters date from the ninth-century. For a long time the letters did not circulate together; instead they appear as two distinct groups: Letters 1 to 88 and Letters 89 to 124.

Early manuscripts for the first group of the letters, 1 to 88, are:

- Two Paris manuscripts of the 10th century, p and P
- Another Paris manuscript of the 11th century, b
- The Codex Laurentianus, of the 9th or 10th century, containing letters 1–65. Designated as L
- The Codex Venetus, of the 9th or 10th century, containing letters 53–88, V
- The Codex Metensis, of the 11th century, known as M
- The Codex Gudianus, of the 10th century, which contains scraps of the earliest letters. Designated as g

For the second group of the letters, 89 to 124, there is only a limited selection of early manuscripts. The best manuscripts are:

- Codex Bambergensis, of the 9th century, known as B. Likely from the scriptorium of Louis the Pious.
- Codex Argentoratensis, of the 9th or 10th century, A. Probably a copy of B. This manuscript was destroyed during the siege of Strasbourg in 1870

In 1913 Achille Beltrami announced the discovery of the earliest manuscript which combined both groups. Codex Quirinianus (or Brixiensis), Q, is a 9th or 10th century manuscript from the Biblioteca Queriniana, Brescia containing letters 1–120.12.

The letters began to be widely circulated together from the twelfth-century onwards, and around four hundred manuscripts of Seneca's letters are known.

=== Printed editions ===
The letters were first printed at Naples in 1475. They were printed in an edition with most of the Seneca's other works, and with works by the elder Seneca. The letters were then published separately, also in 1475, at Paris, Rome, and Strasbourg. Erasmus produced a much superior edition in 1529.

== Legacy and influence ==
Michel de Montaigne was influenced by his reading of Seneca's letters, and he modelled his Essays on them. The letters were a principal source for Justus Lipsius for the development of his Neostoicism towards the end of the 16th century.

== English translations ==
=== Complete ===
There have been several full translations of the 124 letters ever since Thomas Lodge included a translation in his complete works of 1614.

- Thomas Lodge (1614). The workes of Lucius Annæus Seneca, both morrall and naturall. London: William Stansby
- Thomas Morell (1786). The Epistles of Lucius Annæus Seneca. 2 vols. London: W. Woodfall
- Richard M. Gummere (1917, 1920, 1925). Seneca: Ad Lucilium epistulae morales. 3 vols. Loeb Classical Library
- Margaret Graver, A. A. Long (2015). Letters on Ethics: To Lucilius. University of Chicago Press. ISBN 022652843X

=== Selections ===
There have been many selected and abridged translations of Seneca's letters. Recent editions include:

- Robin Campbell (1969). Letters from a Stoic. Penguin. ISBN 0140442103 (40 letters)
- Elaine Fantham (2010). Seneca. Selected Letters. Oxford World's Classics. ISBN 0199533210 (87 letters)
- Margaret Graver, A. A. Long (2021). Seneca: Fifty Letters of a Roman Stoic . University of Chicago Press. ISBN 022678293X (50 letters)

== Quotations ==
The tag Vita sine litteris mors ('Life without learning [is] death') is adapted from Epistle 82 (originally Otium sine litteris mors, 'Leisure without learning [is] death') and is the motto of Derby School and Derby Grammar School in England, Adelphi University, New York, and Manning's High School, Jamaica.

Ducunt volentem fata, nolentem trahunt ('The fates lead the willing and drag the unwilling'), from Epistle 117 paragraph 11 line 5, expresses a fatalistic view of man's subjection to natural and divine will. It is also an example of chiasmus. This line, which Seneca attributes to the Greek Stoic philosopher Cleanthes, is quoted in the last line of German intellectual Oswald Spengler's two-volume work The Decline of the West (1922).

The work is also the source for the phrase non scholae sed vitae: "We do not learn for school, but for life".

== Criticism ==
- Erasmus in his 1529 edition raised three main criticisms of the letters.
  - First was Seneca's habit of mixing personas in the work, running objections and refutations of objections together in a way that Erasmus found not illuminating but obfuscatory.
  - Second was the way Seneca, in complaining about philosophical logic-chopping, nevertheless filled his pages with much of that empty quibbling himself, in illustration – prompting Erasmus to second Quintilian's objection to Seneca's own standing as a philosopher.
  - Thirdly, Erasmus felt that the letters were more disguised essays than a real correspondence: "one misses in Seneca that quality that lends other letters their greatest charm, that is that they are a true reflection of a real situation".
