= Consolatio (Cicero) =

Lost philosophical work by Cicero

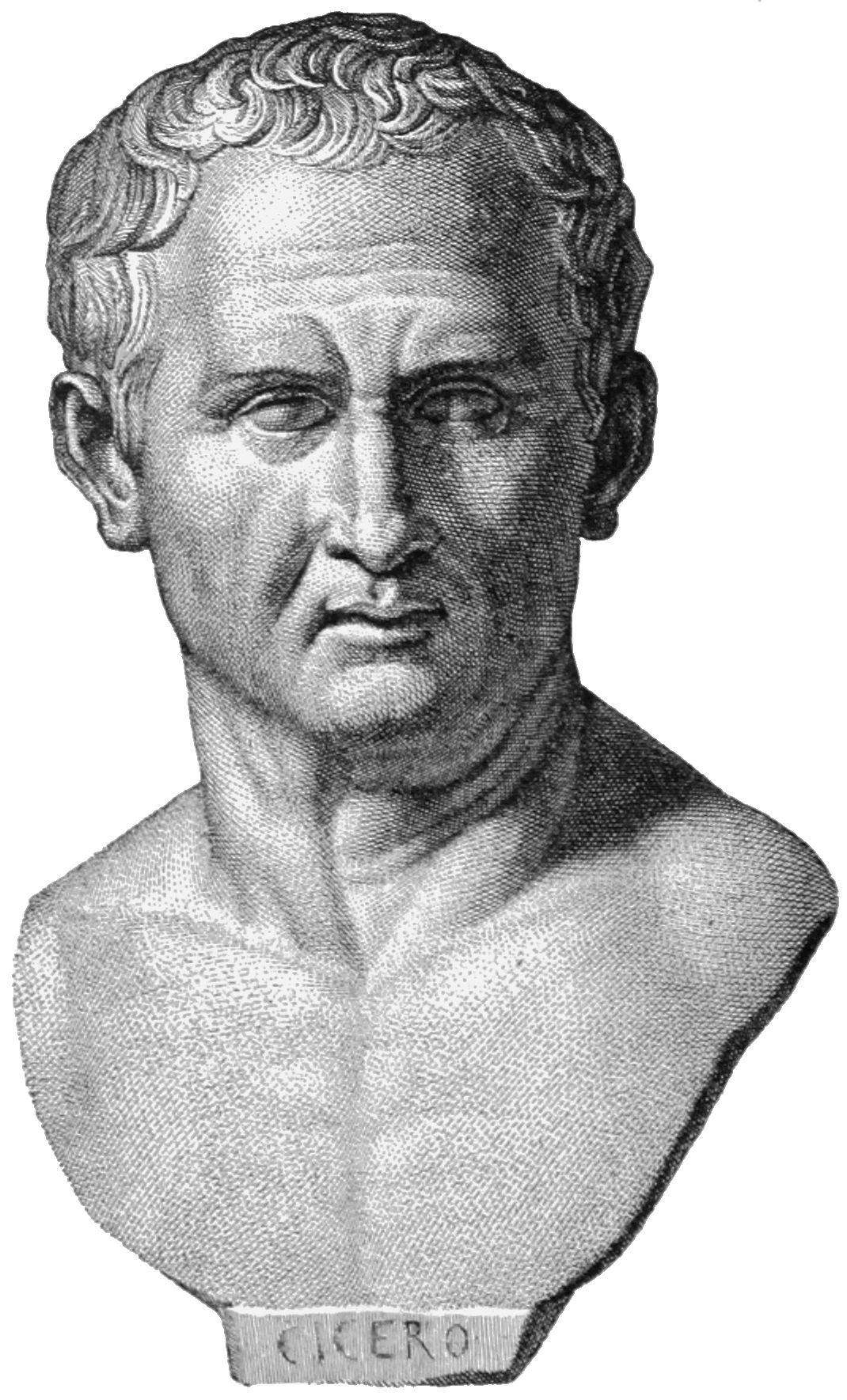
Marcus Tullius Cicero, the author of the Consolatio

Consolatio (Latin: [koːnsoːˈlaːtɪ.oː]; Consolation) is a lost philosophical work written by Marcus Tullius Cicero in the year 45 BC. The work had been written to soothe his grief after the death of his daughter, Tullia, which had occurred in February of the same year. Not much is known about the work, although it seems to have been inspired by the Greek philosopher Crantor's ancient work De Luctu ("On Grief"), and its structure was probably similar to a series of letter correspondences between Servius Sulpicius Rufus and Cicero.

Fragments of the work survive, having been quoted by Lactantius, and Jerome makes note of the work in a consolatory letter to Heliodorus of Altino. A popular piece of writing until its loss, the Consolatio is widely accepted as the distinct work that transmitted the earlier consolatio literary tradition to the Romans of the late Republic. In 1583, Italian scholar Carlo Sigonio claimed to have discovered a non-fragmentary version of the Consolatio, although most scholars now agree that this work was a fake, with modern stylometric methods backing this up. This Renaissance work, now known as the pseudo-Ciceronian Consolatio, does survive.

== Background ==
Marcus Tullius Cicero (January 3, 106 BC – December 7, 43 BC) was an Ancient Roman philosopher and politician, famous for his oratory skills. He came from a wealthy municipal family of the Roman equestrian order, and is widely considered one of Rome's greatest orators, and one of the premier prose stylists during the Golden Age of Latin. Tullia (August 5, 79 BC or 78 BC – February 45 BC), Cicero's daughter, died in the winter of 45 BC after giving birth to her second son; this caused Cicero to go into a period of deep mourning.

Cicero decided to stay with his friend Titus Pomponius Atticus for a time, during which he perused Atticus's library, reading any and all books that dealt with overcoming grief. Unsatisfied with what he found, he relocated to his villa at Astura, where he composed the Consolatio. (It was during this time that he also wrote the famed—and now lost—dialogue Hortensius.) Cicero later opined that the Consolatio was written in an attempt not only to heal himself emotionally, but also to benefit others who are mourning or experiencing sadness.

== Contents ==
But if ever any living creature ought to have been consecrated, surely it was she; if the offspring of Cadmus or Amphitryon or Tyndareus deserved to be raised to heaven by fame, for her the same honor ought certainly be declared. And this I will indeed do, and I shall consecrate you, the best, the most learned of women, placed with the approval of immortal gods themselves among their company, in the estimation of all mortals.

— Translation of a fragment of the Consolatio by Spencer Cole. The extant text, preserved by Lactantius in his work Institutiones Divinae, illustrates Cicero's ideas concerning his own daughter's apotheosis.

Pliny the Elder quotes Cicero in the preface to his Natural History as saying, "I follow [the Greek philosopher] Crantor in my Consolatio" (in consolatione filiae Crantorem ... sequor). Centuries later, the Christian theologian Jerome, in a consolation letter to Heliodorus of Altino concerning the death of St. Nepotian, makes a similar reference, writing that the Consolatio was heavily based on Crantor's ancient work De Luctu ("On Grief"). Some have suggested that Cicero "followed Crantor exclusively or even principally" when composing the Consolatio, but David Scourfield repudiates this view, arguing it was more likely that Cicero's Consolatio simply agreed with Crantor rather than slavishly duplicated his work.

Paul MacKendrick argues that the general outline for the Consolatio can be deduced based both on the structure used by Servius Sulpicius Rufus in a consolation letter sent to Cicero following Tullia's death, as well as the structure of Cicero's reply. From the snippets that remain of the work, it would appear that the piece was addressed to Cicero himself. A novel part of the Consolatio seems to be Cicero's idea that Tullia deserves to be deified as a god. Cicero notes that, in order for his plan to work, her deification must both be approved of by the gods, as well as the Roman public. In order to win over the public, he writes that he will build Tullia a memorial in a well-known location. Cicero also lists a number of famous individuals who have been deified to justify his proposed apotheosis of Tullia.

The only extant pieces of the Consolatio are fragments, one of which was preserved by Cicero himself in his Tusculanae Disputationes. Seven other fragments were preserved by the early Christian author Lactantius in his work Institutiones Divinae (The Divine Institutes). Lactantius used the excerpts from the Consolatio both to point out the futility of paganism, as well as to argue that pagans actually accept some tenets of Christianity without them even realizing it. Lactantius criticized what Cicero wrote, but he also applauded Cicero at times for paralleling—albeit coincidentally—what the Bible says. However, the lines preserved by Lactantius have been criticized due to their lack of context. MacKendrick notes that Lactantius was using "partial quotation[s]" in order to frame what Cicero wrote so that Lactantius could more easily refute his ideas.

Another important reference to the work can be found in the aforementioned letter by Jerome addressed to Heliodorus; Jerome noted that the Consolatio contained references to "men who showed equal fortitude in sorrow and war", namely: Quintus Fabius Maximus Verrucosus, Cato the Elder, Quintus Gallius, Gaius Calpurnius Piso, Lucius Junius Brutus, Quintus Mucius Scaevola Augur, Scaurus, Quintus Marcius Rex, Publius Licinius Crassus, and Gnaeus Aufidius Orestes, as well as members of the Metellus and Marcellus families.

== Legacy ==
The Consolatio was of major importance, and Scourfield argues that it is the distinct work that introduced the Greek consolatio tradition to the Romans of the late Republic. The work may have survived well into the 15th century; St. Ambrose Traversari claimed in his Hodoeporicon to have discovered "a short work about consolation" (opusculum de Consolatione) at Perugia, Italy in 1432 AD. (Note: The identity of this short work as Cicero's Consolatio is not certain. Traversari writes that the "author is unknown" but "very learned" (auctoris ignoti ... sed bene eruditi). Robinson Ellis argues that this document might have been the spurious one discovered by Sigonio in 1583 (although this hypothesis assumes that Sigonio did not forge the document and that the pseudo-Ciceronian Consolatio is a much older text).)

=== Forgery ===
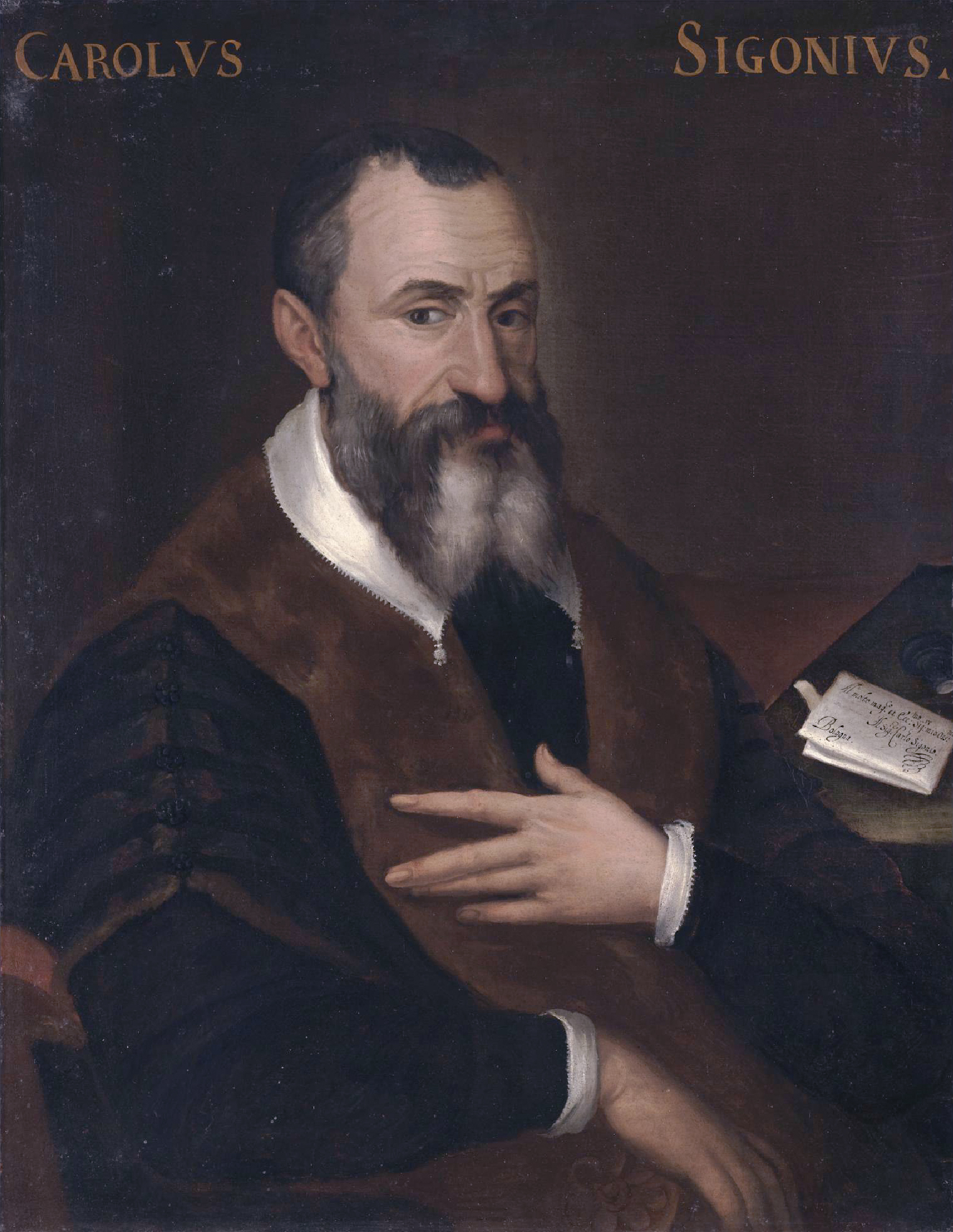
Now considered a forgery, the pseudo-Ciceronian Consolatio was discovered by Carlo Sigonio in 1582.

In 1583, Italian scholar Carlo Sigonio claimed to have discovered a non-fragmentary version of the Consolatio. While this news was met with excitement at first, scholars—after reading the work—began to argue that the manuscript was a fraud, with humanist Antonio Riccoboni being among the most vocal. However, Sigonio continued to defend the work until his death, even mentioning in two different orations his belief in the truthfulness of the text. The scholar Latino Latini, however, later claimed in a letter that Sigonio had admitted to the forgery on his deathbed, although the truth of this statement is unknown. By and large, the academic community concluded that the version of the Consolatio discovered was not genuine. The document, now known as the pseudo-Ciceronian Consolatio, was translated into English in 2022 by the classicist Michael Fontaine.

Despite the gradual condemnation of the work and the accusation that Sigonio had created it himself, there were some holdouts. Robinson Ellis, in 1893, argued that the pseudo-Ciceronian Consolatio, while probably not a genuine work of Cicero's, was not a forgery by Sigonio. He reasoned that, because St. Ambrose Traversari had claimed to find a copy of the work so close to its rediscovery by Sigonio in 1583, it was possible that Sigonio had simply found the Perugian text. He then considered the hypothesis (also discussed by Evan Taylor Sage) that, because the pseudo-Ciceronian Consolatio contained all of the extant fragments of Cicero that are to be found in Lactantius's work, the actual Consolatio had been lost in the distant past and quietly replaced at some point by an imitation. This falsely-attributed work, Ellis wrote, could have then been read by those late antiquity authors who quoted Cicero, such as Lactantius, Augustine, and Jerome. It was this false Consolatio, so the hypothesis goes, that was rediscovered by Sigonio, who also unwittingly believed it also to be genuine. Finally, Ellis argued that, because Sigonio was a man of "high character" who had spent much of his life editing the fragments of Cicero, for Sigonio to stoop to forgery would have been completely out of character.

In 1999, Richard Forsyth, David Holmes, and Emily Tse used linguistic techniques to test the origin of the pseudo-Ciceronian Consolatio. Forsyth, Holmes, and Tse focused their research on two types of Latin: Cicero's writing and "Ciceronianism" (a style of Neo-Latin popular in the fifteenth and sixteenth centuries that sought to emulate the style of Cicero). The three scholars argued that if the supposed Consolatio matched Cicero's legitimate style while being devoid of "Ciceronianism"—that is to say Neo-Latin—then it could be accepted as a genuine work. Forsyth, Holmes, and Tse collected six Classical Latin authors (viz. Cicero, Julius Caesar, Cornelius Nepos, Gaius Sallustius Crispus, Lucius Annaeus Seneca, and Publius Cornelius Tacitus), and five Neo-Latin authors (viz. Sigonio, Piero Vettori, Marc-Antoine Muret, Bernadino di Loredan, and Riccoboni) and compared them using stylometric methods. The three concluded that the text of the pseudo-Ciceronian Consolatio is "extremely uncharacteristic of Cicero, and indeed that the text is much more likely to have been written during the Renaissance than in classical times." The study also provided evidence that the pseudo-Ciceronian Consolatio matched more closely with Sigonio's, rather than any of the other New Latin writers, suggesting—although not proving—that he penned the document.

== Bibliography ==
- Baraz, Yelena (2012). A Written Republic: Cicero's Philosophical Politics. Princeton University Press. ISBN 9781400842162.
- Cole, Spencer (2014). Cicero and the Rise of Deification at Rome. Cambridge University Press. ISBN 9781107032507.
- Fontaine, Michael (2022). How to Grieve: An Ancient Guide to the Lost Art of Consolation, Inspired by Marcus Tullius Cicero. Princeton University Press. ISBN 9780691220321.
- Forsyth, R.; Holmes, D. I.; Tse, E. K.; et al. (1999). "Cicero, Sigonio, and Burrows: Investigating the Authenticity of the Consolatio". Lit Linguist Computing. 14 (3): 375–400. doi:10.1093/llc/14.3.375.
- Haskell, Henry Joseph (1942). This Was Cicero. Alfred A. Knopf. ASIN B00BD0VWRG.
- MacKendrick, Paul (1989). The Philosophical Books of Cicero. Duckworth. ISBN 9780715622148.
- Rawson, Beryl (1978). The Politics of Friendship: Pompey and Cicero. Sydney University Press. ISBN 9780424068008.
- Robinson, Ellis (1893). "On the Pseudo-Ciceronian Consolatio". The Classical Review. 7 (5). Cambridge University Press: 197. doi:10.1017/s0009840x00197525. JSTOR 690471.
- Sage, Evan (1910). The Pseudo-Ciceronian Consolatio. The University of Chicago Press.
- Scourfield, J. H. (1993). Consoling Heliodorus: A Commentary on Jerome, Letter 60. Oxford. ISBN 9780198147220.
- Taylor, John (1963). "St. Augustine and the 'Hortensius' of Cicero". Studies in Philology. 60 (3). University of North Carolina Press: 487–498. JSTOR 4173424. (subscription required)
- Treggiari, Susan (2007). Terentia, Tullia and Publilia: The Women of Cicero's Family. Routledge Press. ISBN 9781134264575.
