= With great power comes great responsibility =

Proverb popularized in the Spider-Man comics

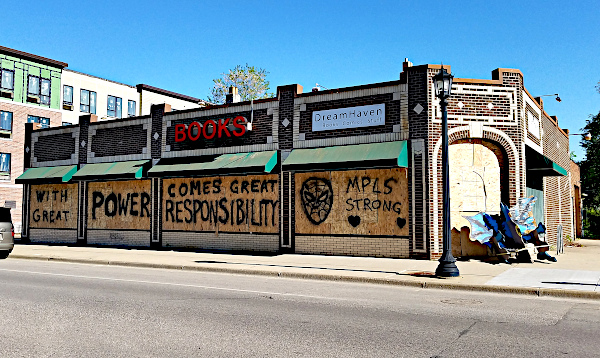
DreamHaven Books, a book store in Minneapolis using the famous quote in its store during the aftermath of the George Floyd protests

"With great power comes great responsibility" is a proverb popularized by Spider-Man in Marvel comics, films, and related media. Introduced by Stan Lee and Steve Ditko, it originally appeared as a closing narration in the 1962 Amazing Fantasy #15, and was later attributed to Uncle Ben as advice to the young Peter Parker. The idea—similar to the 1st century BC parable of the Sword of Damocles and the medieval principle of noblesse oblige—is that power cannot simply be enjoyed for its privileges alone but necessarily makes its holders morally responsible both for what they choose to do with it and for what they fail to do with it. After it was popularized by the Spider-Man franchise, similar formulations have been noticed in the work of earlier writers and orators. The formulation—usually in its Marvel Comics form—has been used by journalists, authors, and other writers, including the Supreme Court of the United States.

== History ==
=== Precursors ===
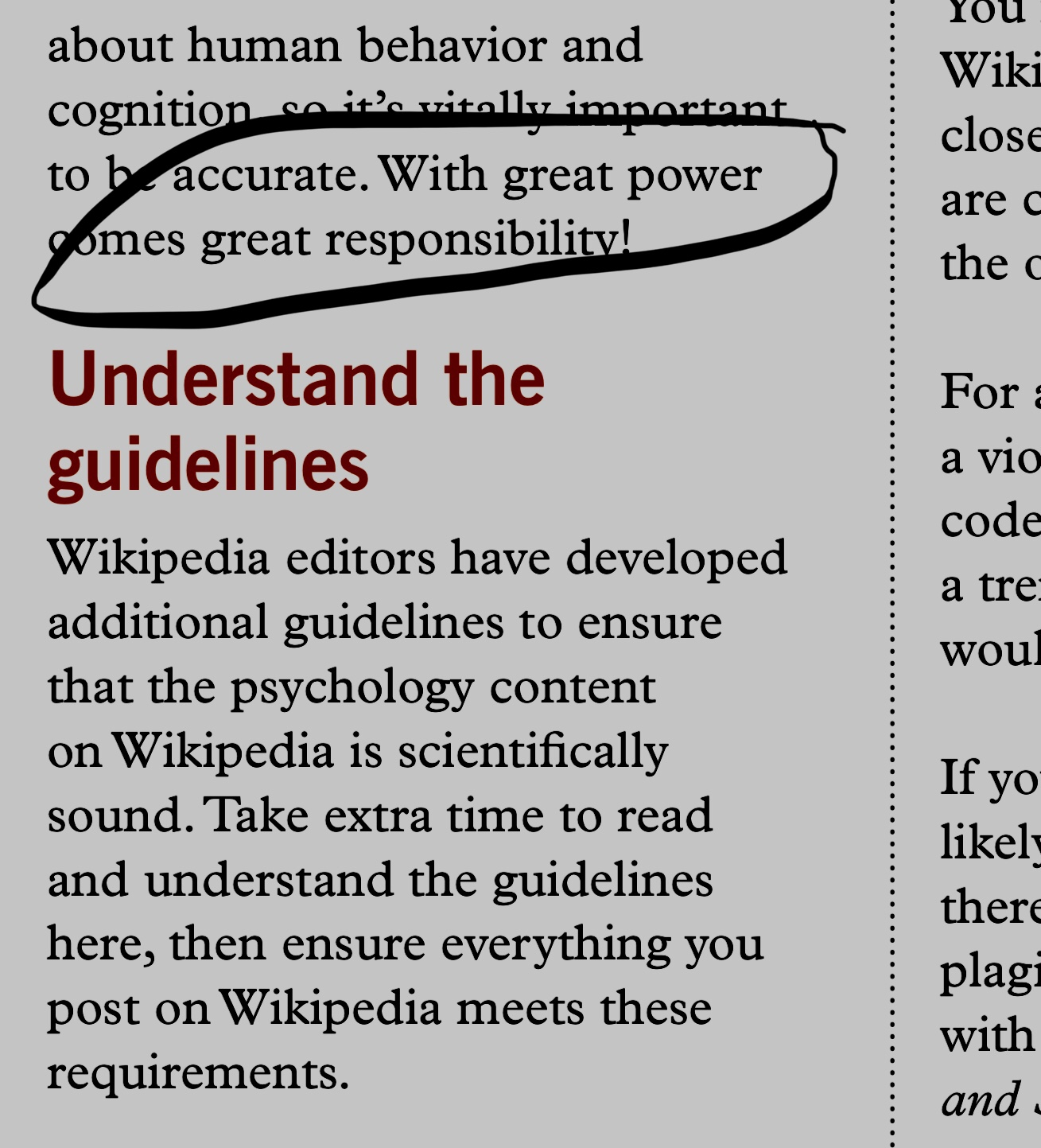
Screenshot of the use by Wikimedia of the phrase in the Wikimedia Foundation's guidelines for how to edit Wikipedia.

Warning when first using sudo has the phrase

Reminders that power is to not be used for wrong and should not be exploited at will are at least as old as the legend of the Sword of Damocles preserved in the 1st century BC Tusculan Disputations of the Roman orator Cicero. Probably retold from earlier but now lost accounts by Timaeus and Diodorus, Cicero relates that the courtier Damocles was overjoyed at the chance to trade places with the 4th century BC tyrant of Syracuse Dionysius the Elder for a day. His happiness was abruptly ended when he found that a sword had been suspended above the throne by a single horsehair, indicating the worry of monarchs—particularly tyrants—over the precariousness of their rule. The historical Dionysius was known for treating his subjects harshly and was deposed twice, eventually dying in exile and poverty in Corinth.

An early Christian parallel appears at the end of Jesus's Parable of the Faithful Servant as related in Luke 12:48: παντὶ δὲ ᾧ ἐδόθη πολύ, πολὺ ζητηθήσεται παρ’αὐτοῦ, καὶ ᾧ παρέθεντο πολύ, περισσότερον αἰτήσουσιν αὐτόν (Greek: pantì dè hō̂i edóthē polý, polý zētēthḗsetai par'autoû, kai hō̂i paréthento polý, perissóteron aitḗsousin autón). This is rendered in the King James Version as "For unto whomsoever much is given, of him shall be much required: and to whom men have committed much, of him they will ask the more" and in the New International Version as "From everyone who has been given much, much will be demanded; and from the one who has been entrusted with much, much more will be asked".

An Islamic parallel appears in a hadith traditionally attributed via Ibn Umar to the prophet Muhammad: كُلُّكُمْ رَاعٍ وَكُلُّكُمْ مَسْؤولٌ عَنْ رَعِيَّتِهِ (Arabic: Kullukum rāʿin wa kullukum masʾūlun ʿan raʿiyyatihi), "All of you are shepherds and each of you is responsible for his flock" or "herd". The full hadith describes the responsibility of leaders, imams, husbands, and wives both for the actions and well-being of those entrusted to their care.

During the French Revolution, the Committee of Public Safety published the following as part of its 8 May 1793 "Plan of Work, Surveillance, and Correspondence" (French: Plan de travail, de surveillance et de correspondance): Ils doivent envisager qu'une grande responsabilité est la suite inséparable d'un grand pouvoir, "[The representatives of the Convention] must understand that a great responsibility is the inseparable result of a great power". Similar phrasing is sometimes misattributed to the French writer Voltaire.

==== British parliamentary history ====
On 27 June 1817, the British member of Parliament William Lamb proclaimed that "the possession of great power necessarily implies great responsibility" during debate over the suspension of habeas corpus amid the rioting and disorder of the economic crisis and poor harvests following the end of the Napoleonic Wars. Relating Lamb's speech, Hansard retold his argument that "his friends would, perhaps reproach him with instigating ministers to curb the press; but nothing, he assured them, was farther from his mind. He was aware of the great benefit the country derived from the liberty of the press, and nothing could induce him to concur in any measure that might tend to injure it; at the same time he was free to confess, that its state had an influence on the vote he gave on the present question".

"But with great power comes great responsibility."

— Robert Gascoyne-Cecil, 4th Marquess of Salisbury, House of Lords, 25 June 1898.

While undersecretary of the Colonial Office, during a 1906 debate about the native people of South Africa., Winston Churchill stated:

"I submit respectfully to the House as a general principle that our responsibility in this matter is directly proportionate to our power. Where there is great power there is great responsibility, where there is less power there is less responsibility, and where there is no power there can, I think, be no responsibility... in South Africa, above all other Colonies, we are provided with a most sure foothold for intervention in behalf of the natives. We have greater power and therefore greater responsibility. A self-governing Colony is not entitled to say one day, 'Hands off; no dictation in our internal affairs,' and the next day to telegraph for the protection of a brigade of British infantry."

Railing against Lords Rothermere and Beaverbrook's Daily Mail and Daily Express, the prime minister Stanley Baldwin complained in a 17 March 1937 speech: "What the proprietorship of these papers is aiming at is power, but power without responsibility, the prerogative of the harlot throughout the ages".

As prime minister himself, Churchill addressed Harvard on 6 September 1943 to encourage Americans to greater efforts in World War II, particularly in cooperation with the British Empire.

"Twice in my lifetime the long arm of destiny has reached across the oceans and involved the entire life and manhood of the United States in a deadly struggle... The price of greatness is responsibility. If the people of the United States had continued in a mediocre station, struggling with the wilderness, absorbed in their own affairs, and a factor of no consequence in the movement of the world, they might have remained forgotten and undisturbed beyond their protecting oceans: but one cannot rise to be in many ways the leading community in the civilised world without being involved in its problems, without being convulsed by its agonies and inspired by its causes. If this has been proved in the past, as it has been, it will become indisputable in the future. The people of the United States cannot escape world responsibility."

=== United States ===
Various presidents of the United States have expressed similar ideas. Recalling press complaints of his prosecution of the Vicksburg campaign, Ulysses S. Grant wrote in his 1885 memoirs that "I took no steps to answer these complaints, but continued to do my duty, as I understood it, to the best of my ability. Every one has his superstitions. One of mine is that in positions of great responsibility every one should do his duty to the best of his ability where assigned by competent authority, without application or the use of influence to change his position."

After discussion of banking and shipping reforms, antilynching legislation, and other issues, President William McKinley's 1899 State of the Union letter closed with the admonition that "Presented to this Congress are great opportunities. With them come great responsibilities. The power confided to us increases the weight of our obligations to the people, and we must be profoundly sensible of them as we contemplate the new and grave problems which confront us. Aiming only at the public good, we cannot err."

A 1908 letter from Theodore Roosevelt to the British historian George Trevelyan noted that "I believe in a strong executive; I believe in power, but I believe that responsibility should go with power, and that it is not well that the strong executive should be a perpetual executive". In a radio address summarizing his 1945 State of the Union letter, Franklin Roosevelt spoke against "power politics", stating that "in a democratic world, as in a democratic Nation, power must be linked with responsibility, and obliged to defend and justify itself within the framework of the general good".

In the first episode of the 1948 serial Superman, Eben Kent (Edward Cassidy) tells his adopted son Clark (Kirk Alyn) that "because of these great powers—your speed and strength, your x-ray vision and super-sensitive hearing—you have a great responsibility."

=== Use in Spider-Man media ===
The specific phrasing "with great power comes great responsibility" evolved from Spider-Man's first appearance in the 1962 Amazing Fantasy #15, written by Stan Lee. It is not spoken by any character, but instead appears in a narrative caption of the comic book's last panel:

And a lean, silent figure slowly fades in the gathering darkness, aware at last that in this world, with great power there must also come -- great responsibility!

The expression's connection to Spider-Man's Uncle Ben was a later development. While Uncle Ben had only two lines in the original story, later stories and flashbacks set when Ben was alive retroactively made the phrase one of his homilies to Peter. The first mention of Ben saying the phrase to Peter was in 1972 in the musical audio drama Spider-Man: A Rockomic written by Stephen Lemberg. However, this attribution would not catch on in the comics for at least another decade.

The earliest appearance of a direct reference to Ben telling Peter the phrase is the 1987 Spider-Man vs. Wolverine #1. The series finale of Spider-Man: The Animated Series makes reference Ben saying it in January 1998 too. He asks "Do you remember what I taught you about great power?" and a version of Peter replies "Yes. With great power there must also come great responsibility."

The phrase gained more popularity and pop cultural significance following its utterance in the live action film Spider-Man (2002), in which it is spoken by both Ben and Peter. The phrase is spoken by Richard Parker (portrayed by Campbell Scott) in an extra scene from The Amazing Spider-Man 2 (2014). The full phrase appears in the film Spider-Man: No Way Home (2021), spoken by Aunt May to Peter moments before her death. Maguire's Peter also recognizes and finishes the phrase when Holland's Peter tells his alternate versions about May saying it to him. Multiple different variations of the phrase were also spoken throughout these films and other media, including by Otto Octavius in Spider-Man 2 (2004), by Ben in The Amazing Spider-Man (2012), by Peter to Tony Stark in Captain America: Civil War (2016), by Jeff to Miles Morales in Spider-Man: Into the Spider-Verse (2018), and by Norman Osborn in the animated series Your Friendly Neighborhood Spider-Man (2025).

"Intelligence is not a privilege, it's a gift. And you use it for the good of mankind." — Otto Octavius — Spider-Man 2 (2004)

"You are a lot like your father. You really are, Peter, and that's a good thing. But your father lived by a philosophy, a principle, really. He believed that if you could do good things for other people, you had a moral obligation to do those things. That's what's at stake here. Not choice. Responsibility." — Ben Parker — The Amazing Spider-Man (2012)

"When you can do the things that I can, but you don't... and then the bad things happen... they happen because of you." — Peter Parker — Captain America: Civil War (2016)

"With great ability comes great accountability." — Jeff Davis — Spider-Man: Into the Spider-Verse (2018)

"With great power comes great respect." — Norman Osborn — Your Friendly Neighborhood Spider-Man (2025)

Contemporary reinterpretations of Spider-Man, including Raimi's 2002 film as well as the Ultimate Spider-Man comic, depict Ben as saying this phrase to Peter in their last conversation together. Comic book writer Greg Pak opined that the motto was "one of the greatest single moral injunctions in all of American pop culture".

The formulation created by Marvel has been used by journalists, authors, and other writers, including the United States Supreme Court and Representative Richard Neal on the occasion of the release of Donald Trump's tax returns.

Steve Ditko, Spider-Man's co-creator, believed this proverb was too heavy a burden to place on a young man.

== See also ==
- Noblesse oblige
- Sword of Damocles
- Power
- Moral responsibility
