= Pseudo-Cicero =

The spurious speech Pridie quam in exilium iret in the early manuscript (9th manuscript) of Cicero's post-exilic speeches

Pseudo-Cicero is the name given by scholars to the unknown authors whose works have been misattributed to Cicero (106–43 BC) or who forged works in his name. These works are known as Cicero's spuria (spurious writings). Pseudo-Ciceronian works have received less scholarly attention in comparison to the Pseudo-Vergiliana.

The most well known Pseudo-Ciceronian work is the Rhetorica ad Herennium. It is contemporary with Cicero and was mistaken for one of his works by its presence in manuscripts alongside the authentic De inventione. In the 5th century, Jerome already treated it as work of Cicero. Raffaele Regio first questioned its authenticity in 1491.

Some works that came to be treated as Cicero's were originally suasoriae, scholastic exercises in imitation. A speech supposedly given on the eve of his exile, Pridie quam in exilium iret, is actually one of these school exercises penned in the 4th century AD. It was transmitted throughout the Middle Ages alongside authentic speeches. It was suspected as spurious as early as the 14th century. The Invectiva of Cicero against Sallust is another school exercise. It was never accepted as an authentic work even in antiquity, although the authenticity of the corresponding invective against Cicero attributed to Sallust was accepted and is still debated. The Pseudo-Ciceronian Invectiva was a response to the (Pseudo-)Sallustian one. There is also an apocryphal letter to Octavian, the Epistula ad Octavianum, which was probably produced as a school exercise in the 3rd or 4th century.

Not all Pseudo-Ciceronian works were school exercises in rhetoric. The Oratio graeca de pace is a translation of a passage in Cassius Dio's Greek history of Rome relating a speech Cicero gave after being recalled to the Senate following the assassination of Caesar. It was mistaken for an actual composition of Cicero by Charles de Hallot de Mérouville as late as 1684.

In the Middle Ages, an anonymous writer also continued Cicero's debate with Catiline in a pair of speeches, Quinta Catilinaria and Catilinae responsio. Pseudo-Ciceronian production continued into the Renaissance, when the complete text of Cicero's lost Consolatio was purportedly found and published. This text is today regarded as a forgery, probably by its discoverer, Carlo Sigonio.

Some works were tenuously ascribed to Cicero by Renaissance scholars and often published under his name. The Libellus de vocabulis rei militaris was misidentified as Cicero's lost military treatise. Tironis notae tachygraphicae, a lexicon written in Tironian notes, was identified as Cicero's by Johannes Trithemius in 1499. It is now generally accepted as a work of Cicero's freedman, Marcus Tullius Tiro. Likewise, the Synonyma Ciceronis, a thesaurus drawn from Cicero's works, was taken to be a work of Cicero on the basis of a forged prefatory letter to his friend, Lucius Veturius. It survives in many versions.

The speech Si eum P. Clodius legibus interrogasset is also of suspect authenticity. The Bobbio Scholiast noted that it was seemingly discovered only after Cicero's death and modern scholars have labelled it Pseudo-Ciceronian.

== Toland's treatment ==
John Toland discusses eleven spurious works of Cicero in the fifteenth chapter of his Cicero Illustratus of 1712, differentiating six "canonical" spuria that he would publish with Cicero's actual works and five lesser texts that he would exclude. Toland's canonical Pseudo-Cicero are:

- Rhetorica ad Herennium
- Invectiva
- Pridie quam in exilium iret (which he called Oratio ad populum et equites Romanos antequam iret in exsilium)
- Epistula ad Octavianum
- Consolatio
- Oratio graeca de pace

Toland's "barbarous" spuria are:

- De memoria artificiali libellus
- Oratio pro Marco Valerio
- Orpheus sive De adolescente studioso
- Tironis notae tachygraphicae
- Liber de synonymis ad Lucium Veturium (a version of the Synonyma Ciceronis)

De memoria artificiali libellus is a discussion of artificial memory written to answer a passage in the Rhetorica ad Herennium promising the same in a future work. It is probably a deliberate forgery. It was taken for an authentic work by Lectius in the 16th century. Oratio pro Marco Valerio is also a probable forgery. It appeared first in a collection of Cicero's speeches edited by Filippo Beroaldo in 1499. In 1836, Johann Caspar von Orelli identified the forger as a certain Janus Cardo Bononiensis. Orpheus was first printed in 1594 from a manuscript not seen since. It is a biography of Orpheus addressed to Cicero's son studying in Athens.

== Works cited ==
- Bailey, D. R. Shackleton, ed. (2002). Cicero: Letters to Quintus and Brutus; Letter Fragments; Letter to Octavian; Invectives; Handbook of Electioneering. Harvard University Press.
- Corbeill, Anthony (2020). "How not to Write like Cicero: Pridie quam in exilium iret oratio". Ciceroniana On Line. 4 (1): 17–36. doi:10.13135/2532-5353/4664.
- East, Katherine A. (2016). "Apocryphal Cicero: John Toland's Cicero Illustratus and Notions of Authority in the Early Enlightenment" (PDF). International Journal of the Classical Tradition. 23 (2): 108–126.
- Forsyth, Richard S.; Holmes, David I.; Tse, Emily K. (1999). "Cicero, Sigonio, and Burrows: Investigating the Authenticity of the Consolatio". Literary and Linguistic Computing. 14 (3): 375–400. doi:10.1093/llc/14.3.375.
- Henderson, John (2021). ""Why Not Cicero?" The Spuriae I. De Exilio". In Klaus Lennartz; Javier Martínez (eds.). Tenue est mendacium: Rethinking Fakes and Authorship in Classical, Late Antique and Early Christian Works. Barkhuis. pp. 151–162. doi:10.2307/j.ctv29j3dpf.14.
- La Bua, Giuseppe (2001). "Sulla pseudo-ciceroniana Si eum P. Clodius legibus interrogasset e sull'ordine delle orazioni negli Scholia Bobiensia". Rivista di Filologia e di Istruzione Classica. 129: 161–191.
- Liong, Katherine Amie (2011). Cicero de re militari: A Civilian Perspective on Military Matters in the Late Republic (PDF) (PhD dissertation). University of Edinburgh. Archived (PDF) from the original on 2023-07-06.
- Novokhatko, Anna A. (2009). The Invectives of Sallust and Cicero. Walter de Gruyter.
- Pieper, Christoph (2023). "'Cicero Cannot Be Separated from the State': In Search of Cicero's Political and Moral Exemplarity in Asconius Pedianus and the Scholia Bobiensia". In Christoph Pieper; Dennis Pausch (eds.). The Scholia on Cicero's Speeches: Contexts and Perspectives (PDF). Brill. pp. 190–214.
- Steinova, Evina (2014). "Carolingian Critters IV: Leiden, Universiteitsbibliotheek, BPL 67F. A Peep into the Workshop of a 'Text Engineer'". Mittelalter: Interdisziplinäre Forschung und Rezeptionsgeschichte. Hypotheses.
