= Synonyma Ciceronis =

Start of the Synonyma (version Abdita) in a 9th-century manuscript from Saint Emmeram's Abbey (now Munich, Bayerische Staatsbibliothek, MS Clm 14252)

The Synonyma Ciceronis (also spelled Sinonima Ciceronis, meaning "Synonyms of Cicero") is a Latin thesaurus drawn from the speeches of Cicero (106–43 BC). There are several different versions of the text and the "relationships between these versions are complex and unclear". In some manuscripts, the Synonyma is prefaced by a Pseudo-Ciceronian letter. The earliest manuscripts date to the 8th century.

== Text ==
The Synonyma consists of batches of synonyms or near synonyms claimed to be drawn from Cicero's speeches. It is sometimes prefaced by a letter attributed to Cicero and addressed to his friend Lucius Veturius, in which Cicero claims to have composed it to help orators enrich their speeches and compose them more quickly. The attribution to Cicero of both the collection and the letter were taken seriously during the Renaissance, but neither is actually connected to Cicero.

Examples of batches of synonyms from the Synonyma are:

acer. intentus. vehemens. perseverans. indeclinatus.
orator. actor. defensor. patronus. causedicus.
dissertus. eloquens. facundus. ingeniosus.

== Versions and editions ==
There are 28 manuscripts of the Synonyma from the 8th through 10th centuries. The two main versions are found in 21 manuscripts altogether. These are known after their first headwords, Orator and Abditum. The former is not in alphabetical order. Another version is found in two manuscripts and five more in a single manuscript each. These are conventionally identified by their first two words. Inanis, longus is found in two manuscripts. The singular versions are Accusat, lacesit; Acer, intentus; Amor, ardor; Arba, humus; and Auctor, orator.

The Pseudo-Ciceronian preface is usually found with the Orator and Abditum texts, its last sentence modified to fit the version that follows. It has been seen both as a school exercise in rhetorical composition that became attached to the Synonyma later and as a deliberate forgery designed to lend legitimacy to an already circulating thesaurus.

The two main versions were published several times during the Renaissance: at Padua in 1482 and 1483, at Augsburg in 1488, at Rome in 1488 and 1491 (the latter reprinted in 1496 and 1500), at Leipzig in 1515 (reprinted 1517) and at Venice in 1587. Four versions have received critical editions. Wilhelm Leonhard Mahne published critical editions of them in 1850–1851 under the title Synonyma ad Lucium Veturium, distinguishing them as the Roman and Parisian editions. Charles Barwick published an edition of one of the singular versions in 1964. Paolo Gatti published editions of Arba, humus and Accusat, lacesit in 1993–1994. Gatti has argued that the different versions are textually independent of one another.

== Bibliography ==
- East, Katherine A. (2016). "Apocryphal Cicero: John Toland's Cicero Illustratus and Notions of Authority in the Early Enlightenment" (PDF). International Journal of the Classical Tradition. 23 (2): 108–126.
- Munk Olsen, Birger (1982). L'étude des auteurs classiques latins aux XI^{e} et XII^{e} siècles, Tome 1: Catalogue des manuscrits classiques latins copiés du XI^{e} au XII^{e} siècle, Apicius–Juvénal. Centre national de la recherche scientifique.
- Steinova, Evina (2014). "Carolingian Critters IV: Leiden, Universiteitsbibliotheek, BPL 67F. A Peep into the Workshop of a 'Text Engineer'". Mittelalter: Interdisziplinäre Forschung und Rezeptionsgeschichte. Hypotheses.
