= Sword of Damocles =

Ancient Greek moral anecdote

Damocles Δαμοκλῆς
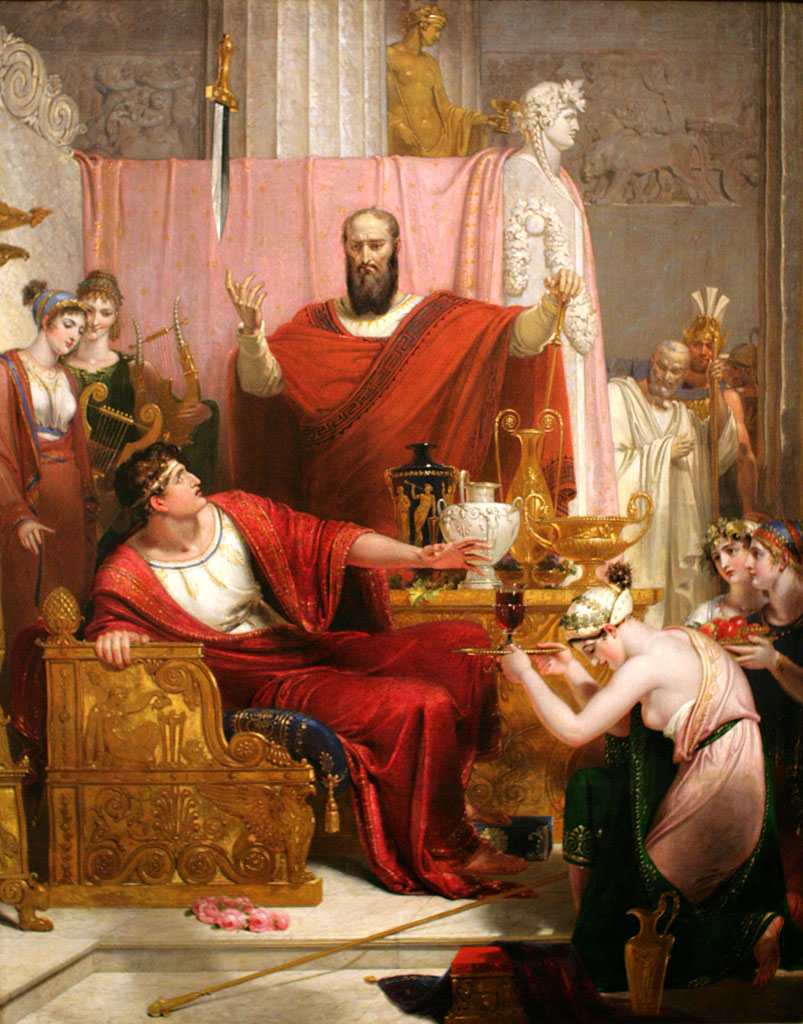
- In Richard Westall's Sword of Damocles, 1812, the boys of Cicero's anecdote have been changed to maidens for a neoclassical patron, Thomas Hope.

In-universe information
- Occupation: Courtier

The Sword of Damocles is an ancient Greek moral anecdote, an allusion to the imminent and ever-present peril faced by those in positions of power. Its main character, Damocles, (Note: /ˈdæməkliːz/; Greek: Δαμοκλῆς, romanized: Dāmoklē̂s, lit. 'fame of the people') was based on a courtier in the court of Dionysius I of Syracuse, a ruler of Syracuse, Sicily, Magna Graecia, during the classical Greek era.

The anecdote apparently figured in the lost history of Sicily by Timaeus of Tauromenium (c. 356 – c. 260 BC). The Roman orator Cicero (c. 106 – c. 43 BC), who may have read it in the texts of Greek historian Diodorus Siculus, used it in his Tusculanae Disputationes, 5. 61, by which means it passed into the European cultural mainstream.

== Plot ==
According to the story, Damocles was flattering his king, Dionysius, exclaiming that Dionysius was truly fortunate as a great man of power and authority without peer, surrounded by magnificence. In response, Dionysius offered to switch places with Damocles for one day so that Damocles could taste that fortune firsthand. Damocles eagerly accepted the king's proposal. Damocles sat on the king's throne amid embroidered rugs, fragrant perfumes, and the service of beautiful attendants. But Dionysius, who had made many enemies during his reign, arranged that a sword should hang above the throne, held at the pommel only by a single hair of a horse's tail to evoke the sense of what it is like to be king: though having much fortune, always having to watch in anxiety against dangers that might try to overtake him, whether it be a jealous advisor or servant, a slanderous rumor, an enemy kingdom, a poor royal decision, or anything else. Damocles finally begged the king for permission to depart because he no longer wanted to be so fortunate, realizing that while he had everything he could ever want at his feet, it could not affect what was above his crown.

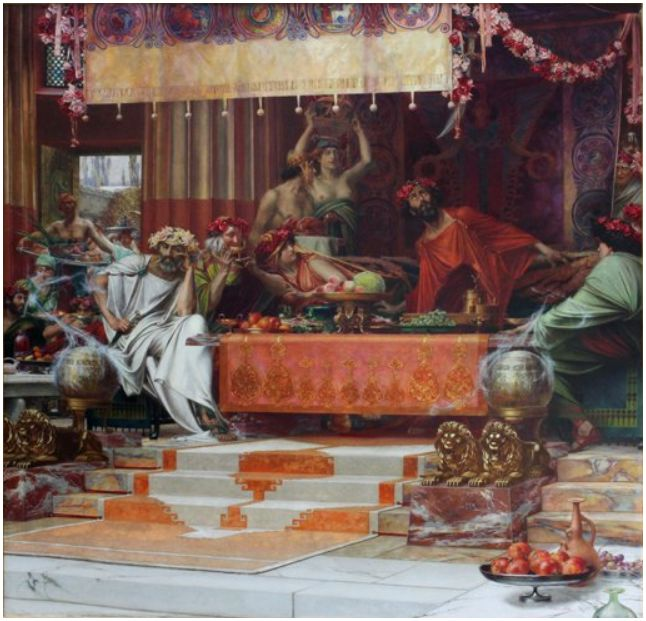
Painting of the story of Damocles by British artist Herbert Gandy, featuring a Damocles surrounded by beautiful servants, lavish foods, gold, and riches, worriedly gazing up at an unsheathed sword above his head

== Interpretations ==
Cicero used this story as the last in a series of contrasting examples for concluding his fifth Disputation, in which the theme is that having virtue is sufficient for living a happy life.

Cicero's meaning in the story of the Sword of Damocles has alternative interpretations. Cicero states, "Doesn't Dionysius seem to have made it plenty clear that nothing is happy for him over whom terror always looms?" arguing that those in positions of power can never rest and truly enjoy that power. Some take this and argue further, stating that the point was that death looms over all, but that it is vital to strive to be happy and enjoy life in spite of that terror. Others take the meaning to be something akin to "don't judge someone until you've walked a mile in their shoes," as it is impossible to know what someone is struggling with, even if their life seems to be perfect to the outside observer. Just as King Dionysius' life looked luxurious and flawless on the outside to Damocles, so too might the lives of others that one covets for oneself. One other interpretation sees the story of the sword of Damocles as explicitly meant for Julius Caesar, implicitly suggesting that he should take care not to act the same way that King Dionysius did, making enemies and denying spiritual life, falling prey to the pitfalls of the tyrant, and mind the sword hanging ever-present over his neck.

== Use in culture, art, and literature ==
The sword of Damocles is frequently used in allusion to this tale, epitomizing the imminent and ever-present peril faced by those in positions of power. More generally, it is used to denote the sense of foreboding engendered by a precarious situation, especially one in which the onset of tragedy is restrained only by a delicate trigger or chance. William Shakespeare's Henry IV expands on this theme: "Uneasy lies the head that wears a crown"; compare the Hellenistic and Roman imagery connected with the insecurity offered by Tyche and Fortuna.

In The Canterbury Tales, Geoffrey Chaucer refers to the sword of Damocles, which the Knight describes as hanging over Conquest. When the Knight describes the three temples, he also pays special attention to the paintings, noticing one on the walls of the temple of Mars:

And al above, depeinted in a tour,
Saugh I Conquest, sitting in greet honour,
With the sharpe swerd over his heed,
Hanginge by a subtil twines threed.

Above, where seated in his tower,
I saw Conquest depicted in his power
There was a sharpened sword above his head
That hung there by the thinnest simple thread.

— Chaucer, Canterbury Tales, l. 2027–2030

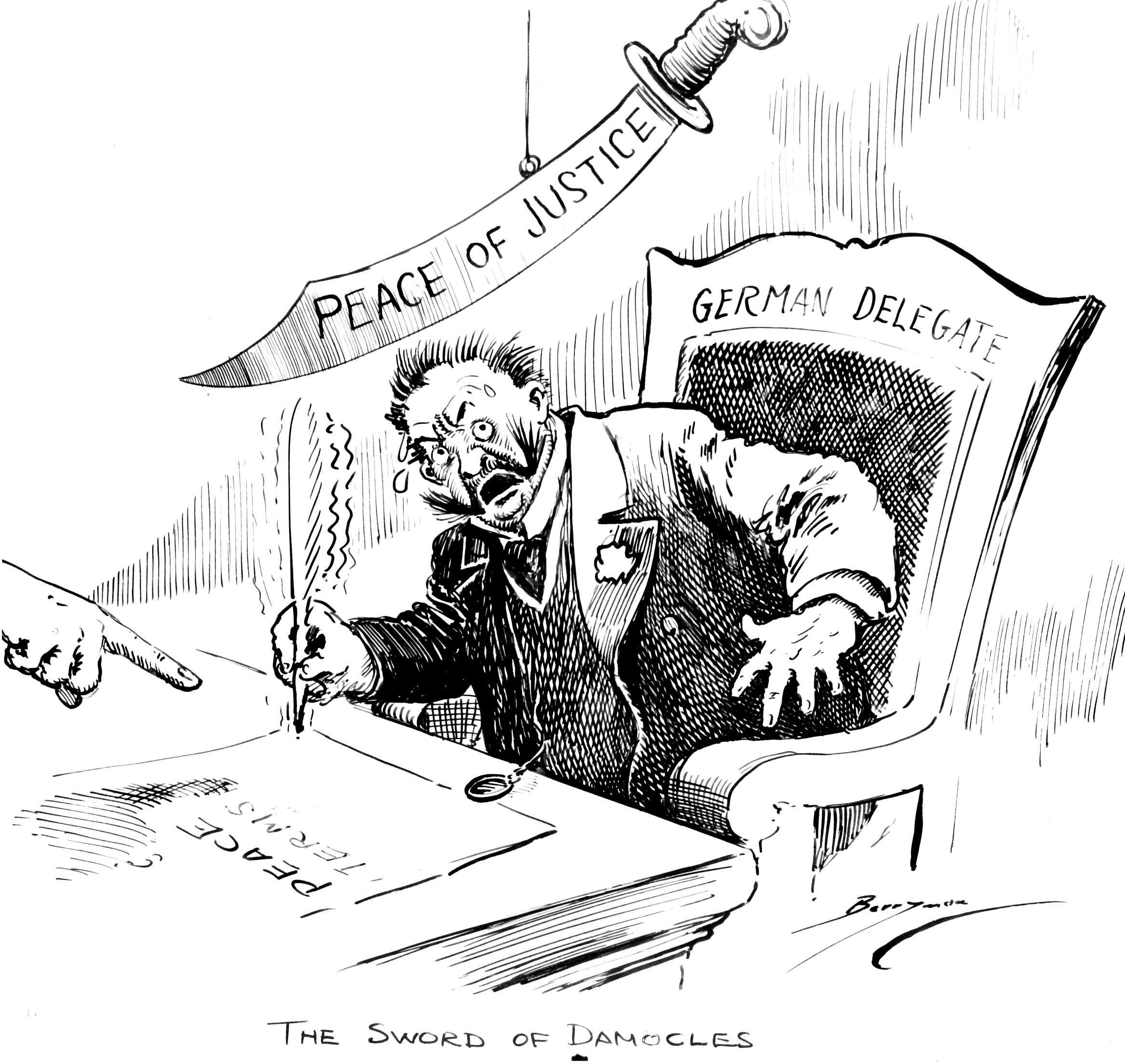
A political cartoon from Clifford Berryman following World War I, depicting a German delegate shakily signing a peace treaty as directed by the large hand of the Allied Powers, while a large sword bearing the inscription "Peace of Justice" hangs by a thread above him (1919)

The Roman 1st-century BC poet Horace also alluded to the sword of Damocles in Ode 1 of the Third Book of Odes, in which he extolled the virtues of living a simple, rustic life, favoring such an existence over the myriad threats and anxieties that accompany holding a position of power. In this appeal to his friend and patron, the aristocratic Gaius Maecenas, Horace describes the Siculae dapes or "Sicilian feasts" as providing no savory pleasure to the man, "above whose impious head hangs a drawn sword (destrictus ensis)."

The phrase has also come to be used in describing any situation infused with a sense of impending doom, especially when the peril is visible and proximal—regardless of whether the victim is in a position of power. United States President John F. Kennedy compared the omnipresent threat of nuclear annihilation to a sword of Damocles hanging over the people of the world. Soviet First Secretary Nikita Khrushchev wanted the Tsar Bomba to "hang like the sword of Damocles over the imperialists' heads".

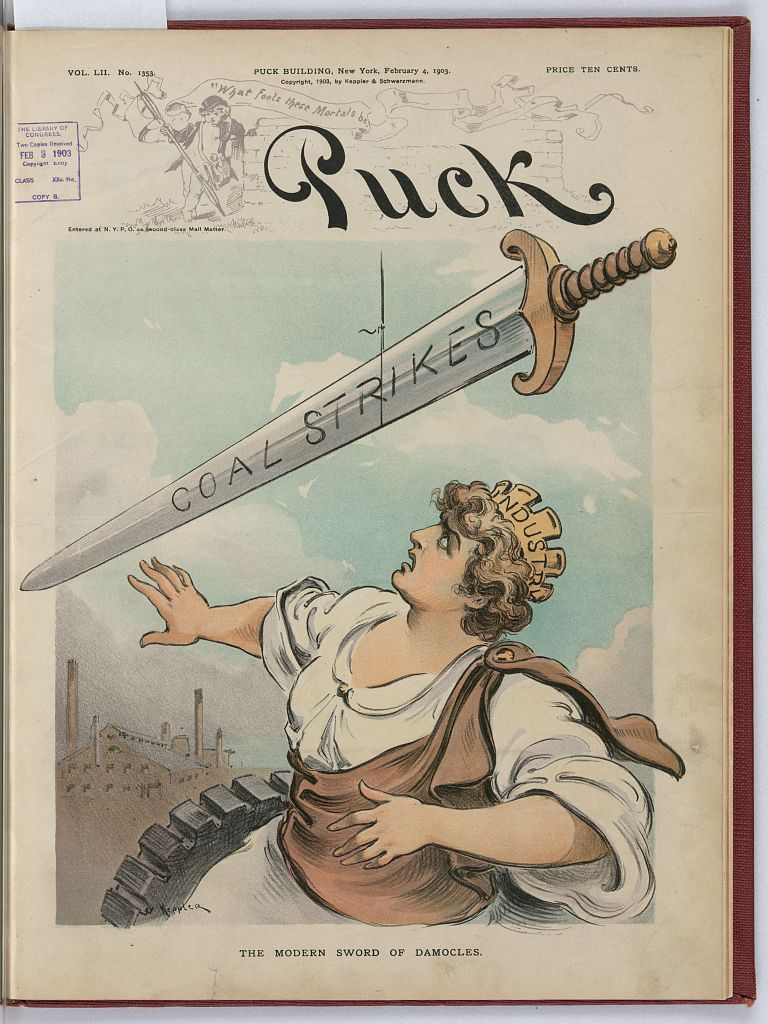
A scene from Joseph Keppler's Puck showing Damocles, wearing a crown labeled "Industry", standing beneath a large sword, labeled "Coal Strikes", which hangs above him by a thread, suggesting that the coal strikes at the beginning of the 20th century were the modern-day sword of Damocles (1903)

Woodcut images of the sword of Damocles as an emblem appear in 16th- and 17th-century European books of devices, with moralizing couplets or quatrains, with the import metus est plenus tyrannis. A small vignette shows Damocles under a canopy of state, at the festive table, with Dionysius seated nearby; the etching, with its clear political moral, was later used to illustrate the idea.

References to the sword of Damocles can also be found in cartoonist illustrations, such as in Joseph Keppler's magazine Puck, a satiric periodical started in the late 1800s in the United States, and the sword can be used as a device to call attention to the peril that current events or contentious issues of the time place the world in.

The sword of Damocles frequently appears in popular culture, including novels, feature films, television series, video games, and music. Some notable examples include Damocles, a 16-bit video game from 1990 in which the player races to prevent the titular comet Damocles from destroying a planet, the song "The Sword of Damocles" from The Rocky Horror Picture Show, and a virtual reality headset also called The Sword of Damocles, developed by Ivan Sutherland in 1968, named for its suspension from the ceiling of the lab in which it was developed and its foreboding appearance.

The Damocles is the name of the ship that is used in a multi-episode plot-line that spanned multiple seasons of the television show NCIS.

The sword of Damocles is an oft-used symbol in modern hip-hop, an allusion used to impart the threat "kingly" rappers face of being deposed as the best of the best. It is referenced in the lyrics of the song "Zealots" by The Fugees in 1996. It also appears in the music of Kanye West, both in the music video for his single "Power" in 2010, where a sword is positioned above West's head as he stands amidst rows of Ionic columns, and in later cover art for the song, which features the impaled head of a black man wearing a crown.

== See also ==
- Croesus and Fate
- With great power comes great responsibility
