= Consolatio =

Type of ceremonial oration

The consolatio or consolatory oration is a type of ceremonial oratory, typically used rhetorically to comfort mourners at funerals. It was one of the most popular classical rhetoric topics, and received new impetus under Renaissance humanism.

== Consolatio as a literary genre ==
The consolatio literary tradition ("consolation" in English) is a broad literary genre encompassing various forms of consolatory speeches, essays, poems, and personal letters. Consolatio works are united by their treatment of bereavement, by unique rhetorical structure and topoi, and by their use of universal themes to offer solace. All consolatio works draw from a relatively narrow range of arguments aimed at offering solace, to allay the distress caused by the death of a loved one, a matter of ill fortuna. The conventional opening of a consolatio was All must die. The most typical arguments characterizing the consolatio genre were: "All must die; even the oldest must die; the youngest too must die, and this is as one with the death of the old."

== History ==
Some scholars claim the genre arose from the Sophist belief in the healing power of discourse. Others believe it arose as a response to passages of grief found in the works of the Greek poet Homer.

This literary tradition flourished in antiquity, and its origins date back to the fifth century BC. Orators in antiquity often delivered consolatory speeches to comfort mourners at funerals or in cases of public mourning. Friends wrote personal letters consoling each other on the loss of a loved one. These were often highly personal and emotional. In addition to personal offerings of solace, consolatio works also include philosophical treatises on grief. These works are usually more detached in tone, and many are written in essay format. Many ancient poets even wrote verse in this distinct consolatio style. These consolatory works are all called consolatio because of their similar arguments, topoi, and distinctive rhetorical appeals. Only fragments of early consolatio works survive, and it is not until Cicero's Tusculan Disputations, Seneca's Ad Marciam, and Boethius' Consolation of Philosophy that a unified character appears. Scholars often view these works as the bedrock of the formal consolatio tradition. (Fournier, introduction)

Although several ancient writings contain elements of the consolatio tradition, it was the Academic Crantor of Soli (c. 325- c. 275BC), a member of Plato's Academy, who first constructed his works in a distinct consolatio Tradition. Although only fragments of his essays have survived, his influence is noted in the works of later writers, particularly Cicero's Tusculan Disputations and Plutarch's consolation to Apollonius. Crantor advocated metriopatheia, a tactic for dealing with strong emotions. Cicero's consolatio is widely accepted as the distinct work that transmitted the earlier consolatio literary tradition to the Romans of the late Republic.

In the Early Imperial Age, most consolatio works were constructed within the framework of Stoicism. Seneca the Younger produced the most recognizable examples of consolatio in his three Consolations, Ad Marciam, Ad Polybium, and Ad Helviam Matrem. The most recognizable example of consolatio in verse form is the pseudo-Ovidian Consolatio ad Liviam. In Boethius' Consolation of Philosophy, Philosophy herself consoles the author in his sore straits.

Other notable examples of the consolatio tradition from Antiquity: Pontus 4.11 in Ovid's Letters from the Black Sea, Statius' poem consoling Abascantus on his wife's death, Apollonius of Tyana, the Emperor Julian, and Libanius. Libanius was also the author of the funeral orations consoling mourners after the death of the Emperor Julian. The Plutarchian Corpus includes three works constructed in the consolatio tradition: De exilio, consolatio ad uxorem, consolatio ad Apollonium.

== Reception and influence ==
In the post-classical period, an additional Christian consolation was developed. In the Middle Ages Christian ideology taught that the distress, and death itself, were punishments for Adam's fall, while conceding that the tribulations of life could be vehicles of divine correction.

The consolatio genre, particularly its distinct tone and topoi, widely influenced other literary genres. Elements of the consolatio tradition can be found in a plethora of later works, and the tradition continued through the Middle Ages and into the early modern era.

A return to the ancient view commenced with Petrarch, though the Quattrocento humanist Coluccio Salutati could only offer the solace of friendships and a sense of duty. The 'art of mourning' 's general revival was expressed in many consolatory letters that circulated in manuscript and were soon printed. Among them Gianozzo Manetti's "bitter dialogue" Antonini, dilectissimi filii sui, morte consolatorius (1438) took the new intimate view of grieving, and Francesco Filelfo offered an extensive compendium of Christian and Classical consolations in his consolatory oration for Antonio Marcello on the death of his son (1461). Marilyn Aronberg Lavin reads Piero della Francesca's gnomic Flagellation of Christ (c 1455–60) as a consolatio of two friends (portrayed) who had each recently lost a son.

Laurence Sterne parodied consolatio and solemn authors in his comic novel Tristram Shandy.

== See also ==
- Consolation of Philosophy
- Eulogy
- Seneca's Consolations
