= Polybius (freedman) =

Freedman of Emperor Claudius

Gaius Julius Polybius (fl. 1st century ) was a freedman of Emperor Claudius who was elevated to the secretariat during his reign.

== Early career ==
He was a freedmen of Claudius and assisted him in his literary, judicial and historical pursuits as a researcher before the emperor's accession. His name indicates that he originally belonged to the Julii.

== Emperor Claudius ==
=== A studiis ===
In January 41 AD, Claudius became emperor and Polybius' gained an official role in the imperial bureaucracy, with the title A studiis. The a studiis was the Imperial Secretary of Research and Records. It was one of the key "Palatine" offices created or expanded by Claudius, who reigned from 41 to 54 AD, to centralize power within the Emperor's household. He was one of three major administrators under Claudius, along with Pallas and Narcissus.

Suetonius, the biographer and secretary to the Emperor Hadrian, claims that Claudius was so appreciative of his help that Polybius was allowed to walk between the consuls when on official business.

=== Ad Polybium ===
Around 43 AD, when Polybius lost a brother, the exiled Seneca the Younger wrote his famous Ad Polybium in response to flatter Polybus. The intent seems to have been to gain Polybius' support for Seneca's recall to Rome. In the work, Polybius is praised for his loyalty to Claudius, but is also admonished that service to an emperor must come before grief. It had no effect on the freedman and Seneca remained in exile.

=== Execution ===
In 47 CE, disloyalty led Polybius to his downfall. He was executed for crimes against the state, supporting the view that freedmen were still in a position inferior to emperor, whatever their influence. Ancient historians claimed that Empress Messalina, the third wife of Claudius, arranged for his death when she tired of him as a lover.

== Legacy ==
He was probably the father of a prominent politician, Caius Julius Polybius, whose house was found in Pompeii.
