= Antonio Riccoboni =

Italian scholar

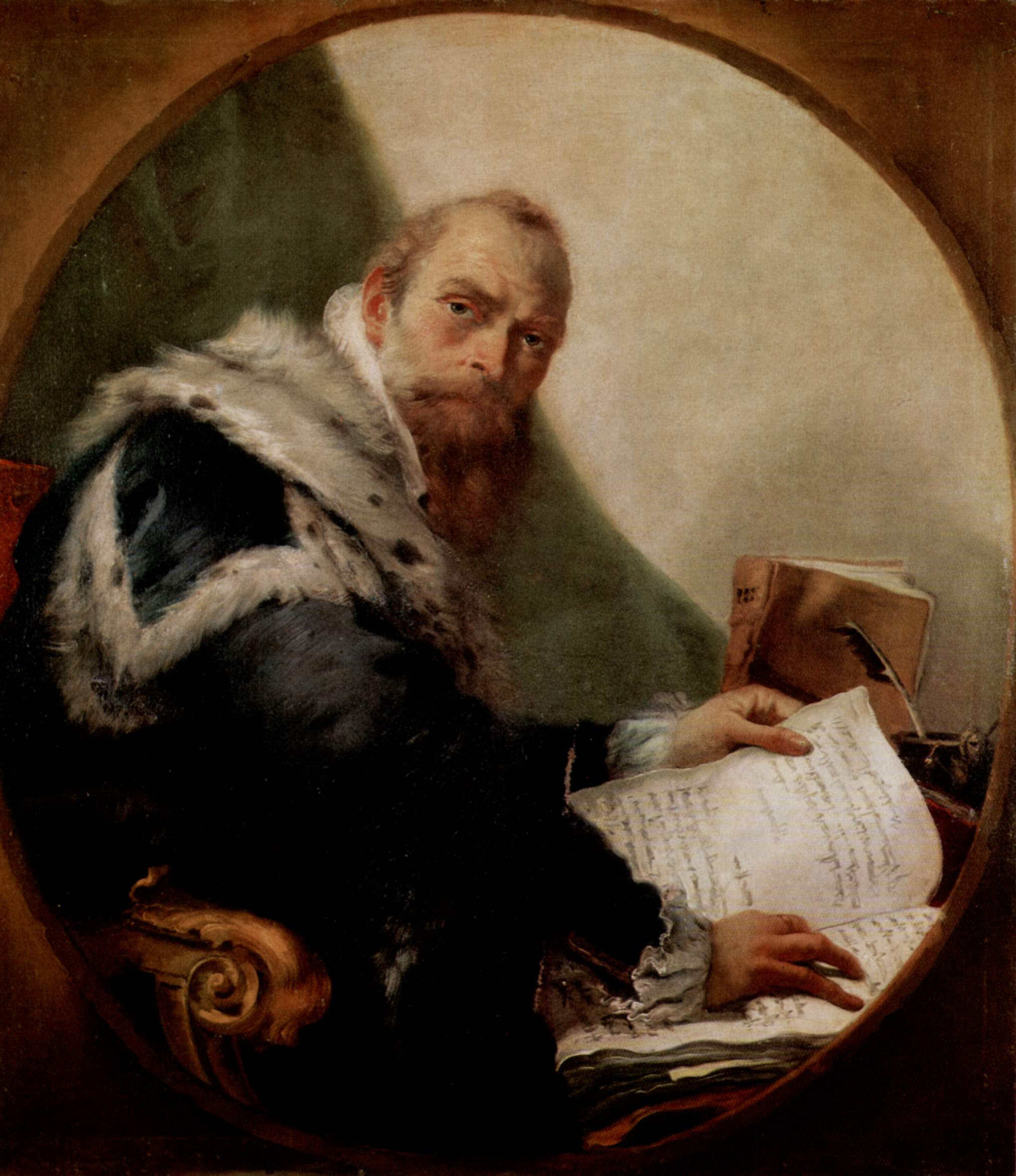
- Portrait of Antonio Riccoboni by Giambattista Tiepolo
- Born: 1541; Rovigo, Republic of Venice
- Died: 27 July 1599 (aged 57–58); Padua, Republic of Venice
- Movement: Renaissance

Academic background
- Education: University of Padua

Academic work
- Discipline: humanism history rhetoric
- Institutions: University of Padua
- Notable works: De Gymnasio Patavino

Antonio Riccoboni (1541 – 27 July 1599) was an Italian scholar, active during the Renaissance as a classical scholar or humanist and historian.

== Biography ==
Antonio Riccoboni was born in Rovigo. First making his life as a tutor, he moved in 1570 to Venice and Padua to study at the University under Paolo Manuzio, Marc-Antoine Muret, and Carlo Sigonio. By 1571, he had been granted a doctorate in civil law, and soon after degrees in canon law. The next year he obtained a post as professor rhetoric at the university, succeeding Giovanni Fasolo.

Among his works were comments regarding the Poetics and Nicomachean Ethics of Aristotle. He also published De Gymnasio Patavino (1598) about the University of Padua. He was among those to claim as fraudulent the Consolatio of Cicero published by Sigonio. Riccoboni died in Padua.

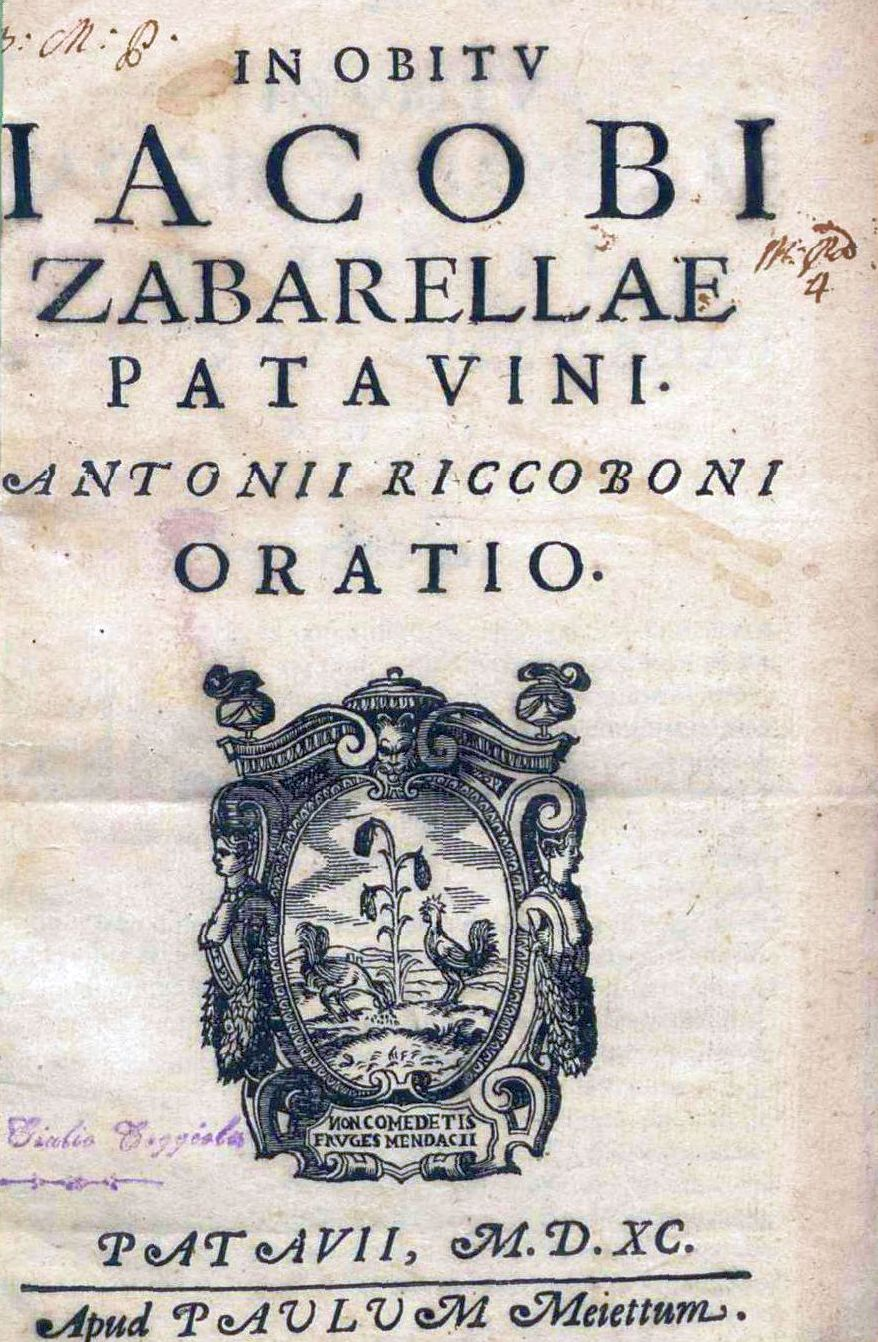
In obitu Iacobi Zabarellae, 1590

== Main works ==
- Riccoboni, Antonio (1568). De Historia commentarius (in Latin). Venetiis: Apud Ioannem Barilettum.
- Riccoboni, Antonio (1598). De gymnasio patavino (in Latin) (1 ed.). Patavii: apud Franciscum Bolzetam.
- Riccoboni, Antonio (1722). De gymnasio patavino (in Latin) (2 ed.). Leiden: Pieter van der Aa.
- Riccoboni, Antonio (1599). De poetica Aristotelis cum Horatio collatus (in Latin). Patavii.
- Riccoboni, Antonio (1590). In obitu Iacobi Zabarellae (in Latin). Patavii: apud Paulum Meiettum.

== Bibliography ==
- Venier, Matteo (2016). "RICCOBONI, Antonio". Dizionario Biografico degli Italiani (in Italian). Vol. 87: Renzi–Robortello. Rome: Istituto dell'Enciclopedia Italiana. ISBN 978-88-12-00032-6.
