= Seneca's Consolations =

Works written around 40–45 AD

Seneca's Consolations refers to Seneca’s three consolatory works, De Consolatione ad Marciam, De Consolatione ad Polybium, De Consolatione ad Helviam, written around 40–45 AD.

== Context of the Consolations ==
Seneca’s three consolatory works, De Consolatione ad Marciam, De Consolatione ad Polybium, and De Consolatione ad Helviam Matrem, were all constructed in the Consolatio Literary Tradition, dating back to the fifth century BC. The Consolations are part of Seneca’s Treatises, commonly called Dialogues, or Dialogi. These works clearly contain essential principles of Seneca’s Stoic teachings. Although they are personal addresses of Seneca, these works are written more like essays than personal letters of consolation. Furthermore, although each essay is particular in its address of consolation, the tone of these works is notably detached. Seneca seems more preoccupied with presenting facts of the universe and the human condition instead of offering solace. This detachment may be a result of Seneca’s attempt to gain favor and contrive a return from exile through these Consolatio works, instead of merely offering a friendly hand of comfort.

== De Consolatione ad Helviam Matrem ==
In De Consolatione ad Helviam Matrem, Seneca writes his mother to console her on his recent exile to Corsica. In this work, Seneca employs many of the rhetorical devices common to the Consolatio Tradition, while also incorporating his Stoic Philosophy. Seneca is the consoler and the one inflicting suffering in this work, and notes this paradox in the text.

Seneca was charged with adultery with Julia Livilla, sister of Emperor Caligula in 41 AD. He was shortly after exiled to Corsica. Scholars have concluded that the De Consolatione ad Helviam is dated roughly 42/43 AD. In the text, Seneca tells his mother he does not feel grief, therefore she should not mourn his absence. He refers to his exile merely as a ‘change of place’ and reassures her his exile did not bring him feelings of disgrace. Seneca comments on his mother's strong character as a virtue that will allow her to bear his absence.

Seneca's seemingly positive outlook on his own exile follows his Stoic philosophy teachings that one should not be upset by uncontrollable events. This quote from De Consolatione ad Helviam, shows Seneca's presentation of his life as tolerable, and even spiritually enjoyable:

I am joyous and cheerful, as if under the best of circumstances. And indeed, now they are the best, since my spirit, devoid of all other preoccupations, has room for its own activities, and either delights in easier studies or rises up eager for the truth, to the consideration of its own nature as well as that of the universe…

== De Consolatione ad Polybium ==
Seneca wrote De Consolatione ad Polybium approximately 43/44 AD, during his years in exile. Scholars often refer to this work as the definitive representation of the part of Seneca's life he spent in exile. This Consolatio addresses Polybius, Emperor Claudius’ Literary Secretary, to console him on the death of his brother. The essay contains Seneca’s Stoic philosophy, with particular attention to the inescapable reality of death. Although the essay is about a very personal matter, the essay itself doesn’t seem particularly empathetic to Polybius’ unique case, but rather a broader essay on grief and bereavement. In fact, the reader doesn't ever find out the name of Polybius’ deceased brother. One scholar claims that the De Consolatione ad Polybium is an attempt by Seneca to contrive his return from exile. (Rudich) This letter to Polybius clearly tries to gain his favor, and as well as flatter the Emperor Claudius, ironically seeking to draw empathy for himself in the process:

As many tears as are left to me by my own fortune I do not refuse to shed lamenting yours. For I will manage to find in my eyes, exhausted as they are by my private crying, some that still may pour out, if this will do you any good.

In the text of De Consolatione ad Polybium, Seneca encourages Polybius to distract himself from grief with his busy work schedule. The tonal switch from consoling Polybius to flattery of Emperor Claudius occurs in chapter 12. (Ball) Seneca credits the emperor as the source of his ‘high station’ and as the giver of his, ‘pleasure of being able to perform duties.’ (Ball) Seneca then delves into a series of prayers of devotion and flattery, which invoke long life for the emperor. This switch is sudden, abrupt, and incongruent with Seneca's Stoic philosophy. (Rudrich) It appears almost desperate in its presentation. In fact, the tone is so recognizably changed, some scholars claim other authorship besides Seneca. (Ball) However, it is most widely accepted that the tonal switch in De Consolatione ad Polybium was nothing more than Seneca's desperate attempt to escape exile and return from Corsica. (Rudich)

== De Consolatione ad Marciam ==
De Consolatione ad Marciam ("On Consolation to Marcia") is a work by Seneca written around 40 AD. Like Seneca's other consolatory works, this consolation is constructed in the Consolatio tradition, and takes the form of an essay versus a personal letter. Seneca was most likely motivated to write this letter of consolation to Marcia in order to gain her favor; Marcia was the daughter of a prominent historian, Aulus Cremutius Cordus, and her family's enormous wealth and influence most likely inspired Seneca to write this letter of consolation. Through the essay he sticks to philosophical abstractions concerning Stoic precepts of life and death. For a letter offering solace, he notably lacks empathy toward Marcia's individual grief and loss.

Marcia actively mourned the death of her son Metilius for over three years. In De Consolatione ad Marciam, Seneca attempts to convince her that the fate of her son, while tragic, should not have been a surprise. She knew many other mothers who had lost their sons; why should she expect her own son to survive her? The acknowledgement, even expectation, of the worst of all possible outcomes is a tenet of Seneca's Stoic philosophy. While Seneca sympathised with Marcia, he reminded her that "we are born into a world of things which are all destined to die," and that if she could accept that no one is guaranteed a just life (that is, one in which sons always outlive their mothers), she could finally end her mourning and live the rest of her life in peace.

the inhabited world... in huge conflagration it will burn and scorch and burn all mortal things... stars will clash with stars and all the fiery matter of the world... will blaze up in a common conflagration. Then the souls of the Blessed, who have partaken of immortality, when it will seem best for god to create the universe anew… will be changed again into our former elements. Happy, Marcia, is your son who knows these mysteries! (Seneca, Ad Marciam de Consolatione)

Seneca contrasted two models of maternal grieving: that of Octavia Minor, sister of Augustus, who, on losing her only son Marcellus in his twenties, "set no bounds to her tears and moans"; with that of Livia, wife of Augustus, who on losing her son Drusus "as soon as she had placed him in the tomb, along with her son she laid away her sorrow, and grieved no more than was respectful to Caesar or fair Tiberius, seeing that they were alive."

== Consolatory letters ==
Several of Seneca's Moral Epistles are also consolations. Two of the consolations are addressed to Lucilius: Epistle 63 consoles him on the death of his friend Flaccus; Epistle 93 consoles him on the death of the philosopher Metronax. Epistle 99 consists largely of a copy of a letter Seneca wrote to his friend Marullus, following the death of his "little son."

== See also ==
- Consolation of Philosophy
- Consolatio Literary Genre
