= Carolus Sigonius =

16th-century Italian humanist from Modena (c. 1524–1584)

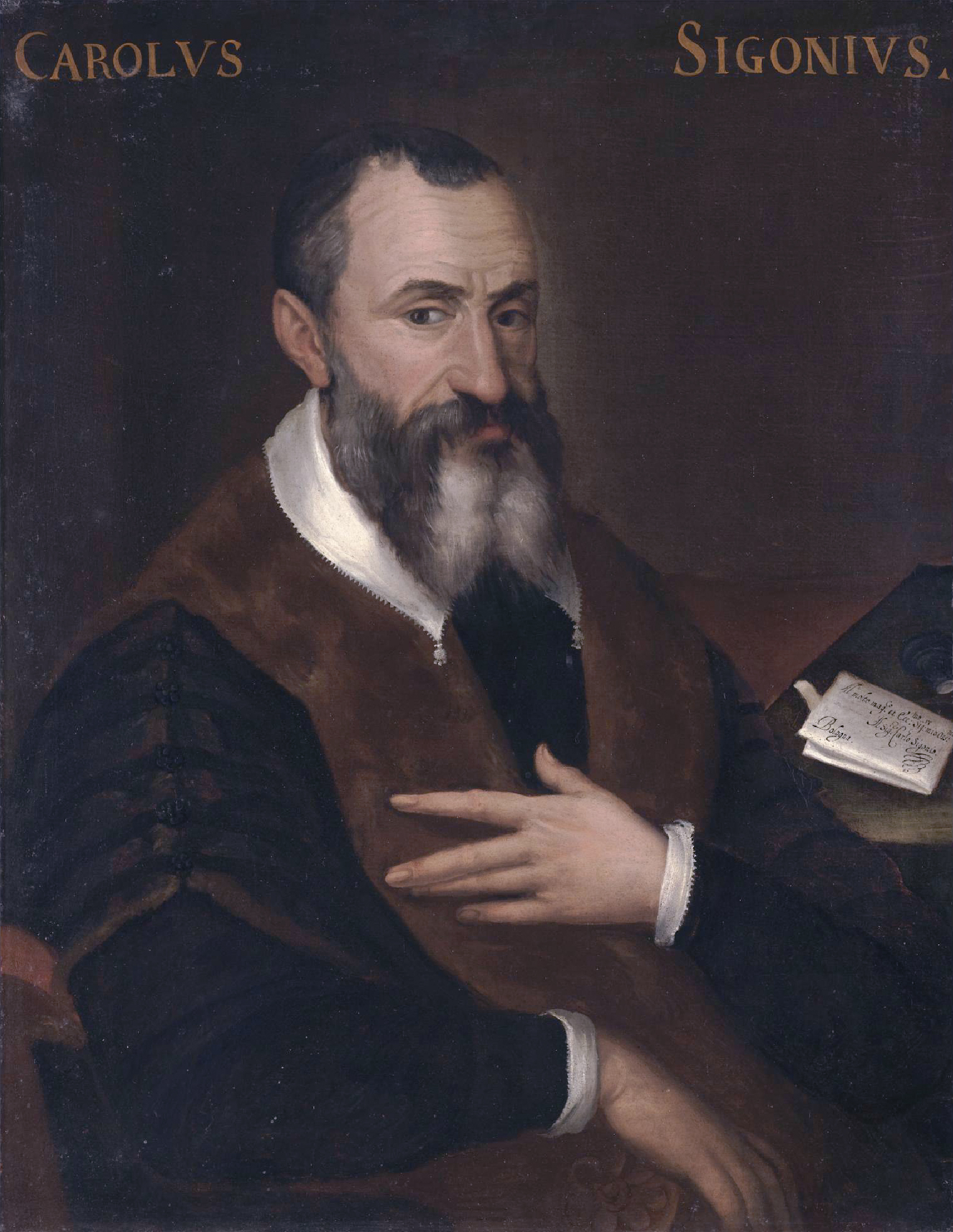
- Born: 1524; Modena, Duchy of Modena
- Died: 27 August 1584, 28 August 1584; Modena, Duchy of Modena
- Resting place: Sant'Agostino
- Education: University of Bologna, University of Pavia
- Occupations: Historian, university teacher, classical scholar
- Employers: University of Bologna; University of Padua
- Movement: Renaissance

Carolus Sigonius (Carlo Sigonio or Sigone) (c. 1524 – 12 August 1584) was an Italian humanist, born in Modena.

== Biography ==
Having studied Greek under the learned Franciscus Portus of Candia, he attended the philosophical schools of Bologna and Pavia. In 1545, he was elected professor of Greek in his native place in succession to Portus. In 1552, he was appointed to a professorship at Venice, which he exchanged for the chair of eloquence at Padua in 1560.

To this period of his life belongs a quarrel with Robortello, due to the publication by Sigonius of a treatise De nominibus Romanorum, in which he corrected several errors in a work of Robertelli on the same subject. The quarrel was patched up by the intervention of Cardinal Seripando (who purposely stopped on his way to the Council of Trent), but broke out again in 1562, when the two rivals found themselves colleagues at Padua. Sigonius, who was of a peaceful disposition, thereupon accepted (in 1563) a call to Bologna. He died in a country house purchased by him in the neighbourhood of Modena, in August 1584. The last year of his life was embittered by another literary dispute.

In 1583, Sigonius edited a manuscript purported to be the long-sought Consolatio by Cicero, written as a distraction from his grief at the death of his daughter Tullia. Published in Venice, it was based on a book found by an obscure bookseller, named Vianelli. Sigonius declared that, if not genuine, it was at least worthy of Cicero; those who held the opposite view (Antonio Riccoboni, Justus Lipsius, and others) asserted that Sigonius himself had written it with the object of deceiving the learned world, a charge which he explicitly denied. The original manuscript was never produced. The work is now universally regarded as a forgery, whoever may have been the author of it.

== Works ==
Sigonius's reputation chiefly rests upon his publications on Greek and Roman antiquities, which may even now be consulted with advantage:

- Fasti consulares (1550; new ed., Oxford, 1802), with commentary, from the regal period to Tiberius. This work is based on the lists. also called Fasti Capitolini, in which the some events of the history of Ancient Rome was set forth in chronological order, based upon some fragments of old bronze tablets dug up in 1547 on the site of the old Forum
- an edition of Livy with the Scholia
- De antiquo jure Romanorum, Italiae, provinciarum (1560) and De Romanae jurisprudentiae judiciis (1574)
- De republica Atheniensium (1564) and De Atheniensium et Lacedaemoniorum temporibus (1565), the first well-arranged account of the constitution, history, and chronology of Athens and Sparta, with which may be mentioned a similar work on the religious, political, and military system of the Jews (De republica hebreorum).
- De regno Italiae (1580), his history of the kingdom of Italy, from the invasion of the Lombards (568) to the end of the 13th century, forms a companion volume to the history of the western empire (De occidentali imperio, 1579) from Diocletian to its destruction.

In order to obtain material for these works, Sigonius consulted all the archives and family chronicles of Italy, and the public and private libraries, and the autograph manuscript of his De regno Italiae, containing all the preliminary studies and many documents not used in print, was discovered in the Ambrosian library of Milan.

At the request of Pope Gregory XIII, he undertook a project to write the history of the Christian Church, but did not live to complete the work. The most complete edition of his works is that by F. Argelati (Milan, 1732–1737), which contains his life by L.A. Muratori, a trustworthy authority for the biographer.

== Bibliography ==
- This work in turn cites:
  - Girolamo Tiraboschi, Storia della letteratura italiana, vii;
  - Pierre Louis Ginguené, Histoire littéraire d'Italie;
  - J.P. Krebs, Carl Sigonius (1840), including some Latin letters of Sigonius and a complete list of his works in chronological order;
  - Giovanni Franciosi, Della vita e delle opere di Carlo Sigonio (Modena, 1872);
  - Alfred Hessel, De regno Italiae libri XX. von Carlo Sigonio, eine quellenkritische Untersuchung (1900);
  - J.E. Sandys, History of Classical Scholarship, ii. (1908), p. 143.
