= Tusculanae Disputationes =

Literary work by Cicero

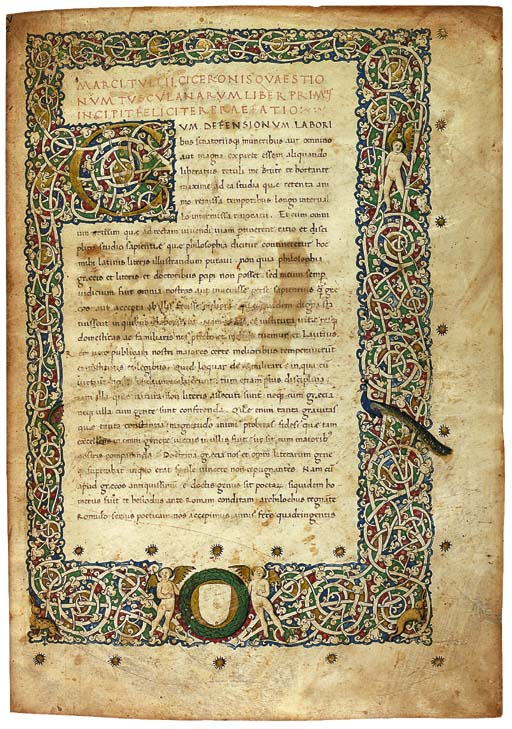
- Tusculanae Disputationes illuminated manuscript
- Author: Cicero
- Language: Classical Latin
- Subject: Ethics
- Genre: Philosophy
- Publication date: 45 BC
- Publication place: Roman Republic
- Original text: Tusculanae Disputationes at Latin Wikisource

The Tusculanae Disputationes (also Tusculanae Quaestiones; English: Tusculan Disputations) is a series of five books written by Cicero, around 45 BC, attempting to popularise Greek philosophy in ancient Rome, including Stoicism. It is so called as it was reportedly written at his villa in Tusculum. His daughter had recently died and in mourning Cicero devoted himself to philosophical studies. The Tusculan Disputations consist of five books, each on a particular theme: On the contempt of death; On pain; On grief; On emotional disturbances; and whether Virtue alone is sufficient for a happy life.

== Context ==
In the year 45 BC, when Cicero was around 61 years old, his daughter, Tullia, died following childbirth. Her loss afflicted Cicero to such a degree that he abandoned all public business and left the city retiring to Asterra, which was a country house that he had near Antium. There he devoted himself to philosophical studies, writing several works, including De finibus. It was his custom to take some friends with him into the country for intellectual discussion. His Tusculan villa had a gallery called the Academy, which Cicero had built for the purpose of philosophical conversation.

It is largely agreed that Cicero wrote the Tusculan Disputations in the summer and/or autumn of 45 BC. Cicero addresses the Disputationes to his friend Brutus, a fellow politician of note, and later assassin of Julius Caesar. In the first book Cicero sets up the fiction that they are the record of five days of discussions with his friends written after the recent departure of Brutus. The second book includes the detail that Cicero and his friends spent their mornings in rhetorical exercises and their afternoons in philosophical discussions. The conversations are however very one-sided—the anonymous friend of each dialogue acts merely to supply the topic for the day and to provide smooth transitions within the topic.

Cicero heavily relied on Crantor's "On Grief" (Latin: De Luctu, Greek: Περὶ Πένθους) in his Tusculan Disputations. Cicero also made great use of it while writing his celebrated Consolatio on the death of his daughter, Tullia. Several extracts from "On Grief" are preserved in Pseudo-Plutarch's treatise on Consolation addressed to Apollonius, which has many parallels with Tusculan Disputations.

== Books ==
The Tusculanae Disputationes consist of five books:

1. "On the contempt of death"
2. "On bearing pain"
3. "On grief of mind"
4. "On other perturbations of the mind"
5. "Whether virtue alone be sufficient for a happy life"

The purpose of Cicero's lectures is to fortify the mind with practical and philosophical lessons adapted to the circumstances of life, to elevate us above the influence of all its passions and pains. In each of the dialogues, one of the guests, who is called the Auditor, sets up a topic for discussion. Each dialogue begins with an introduction on the excellence of philosophy, and the advantage of adopting the wisdom of the Greeks into the Latin language.

=== Book 1 ===
In the first dialogue the auditor asserts that death is an evil, which Cicero proceeds to refute:

Efficiet enim ratio ut, quaecumque vera sit earum sententiarum quas exposui, mors aut malum non sit aut sit bonum potius. Nam si cor aut sanguis aut cerebrum est animus, certe, quoniam est corpus, interibit cum reliquo corpore; si anima est, fortasse dissipabitur; si ignis, extinguetur; si est Aristoxeni harmonia, dissolvetur. [...] His sententiis omnibus nihil post mortem pertinere ad quemquam potest; pariter enim cum vita sensus amittitur; non sentientis autem nihil est ullam in partem quod intersit. Reliquorum sententiae spem adferunt, si te hoc forte delectat, posse animos, cum e corporibus excesserint, in caelum quasi in domicilium suum pervenire.

For reason will demonstrate that, whichever of the opinions which I have stated is true, it must follow, then, that death cannot be an evil; or that it must rather be something desirable; for if either the heart, or the blood, or the brain, is the soul, then certainly the soul, being corporeal, must perish with the rest of the body; if it is air, it will perhaps be dissolved; if it is fire, it will be extinguished; if it is Aristoxenus's harmony, it will be put out of tune. [...] In all these opinions, there is nothing to affect any one after death; for all feeling is lost with life, and where there is no sensation, nothing can interfere to affect us. The opinions of others do indeed bring us hope; if it is any pleasure to you to think that souls, after they leave the body, may go to heaven as to a permanent home.

Cicero offers largely Platonist arguments for the soul's immortality, and its ascent to the celestial regions where it will traverse all space—receiving, in its boundless flight, infinite enjoyment. He dismisses the gloomy myths concerning the Greek underworld. But even if death is to be considered as the total extinction of sense and feeling, Cicero still denies that it should be accounted an evil. This view he supports from a consideration of the insignificance of the pleasures of which we are deprived. He illustrates this with the fate of many historical characters, who, by an earlier death, would have avoided the greatest ills of life.

=== Book 2 ===
In the second dialogue the same guest announces that pain is an evil. Cicero argues that its sufferings may be overcome, not by the use of Epicurean maxims,—"Short if severe, and light if long," but by fortitude and patience; and he censures those philosophers who have represented pain in too formidable colours, and reproaches those poets who have described their heroes as yielding to its influence. Pain can be neutralized only when moral evil is regarded as the sole evil, or as the greatest of evils that the ills of body and of fortune are held to be infinitesimally small in comparison with it.

=== Book 3 ===
In the third book, Cicero treats of the best alleviations of sorrow. Cicero's treatment of this is closely parallel to that of pain. He observes that grief is postponed or omitted in times of stress or peril, and he notes that grief is often put on or continued solely because the world expects it. People have a false estimate of the causes of grief: deficiencies in wisdom and virtue, which ought to be the objects of the profoundest sorrow, occasioning less regret than is produced by comparatively slight disappointments or losses. To foresee calamities, and be prepared for them, is either to repel their assaults, or to mitigate their severity. After they have occurred, we ought to remember that grieving cannot help us, and that misfortunes are not peculiar to ourselves, but are the common lot of humanity. Pain and grief may be met, borne and overcome so as not to interfere with our happiness and our permanent well-being.

=== Book 4 ===
The fourth book treats those passions and vexations which Cicero considers as diseases of the soul. These Cicero classes under the four Stoic divisions: grief (including forms such as envy), fear, excessive gladness, and immoderate desire. They all result from false opinions as to evil and good. Grief and fear arise from the belief that their objects are real and great evils; undue gladness and desire, from the belief that their objects are real and great goods. The only preventive or remedy is the regarding, with the Stoics, of virtue as the sole good, and vice as the sole evil, or, at the least, with the Peripatetics, considering moral good and evil as the extremes of good and evil that no good or evil of body or of fortune can be of any comparative significance.

=== Book 5 ===
In the fifth book Cicero attempts to prove that virtue alone is sufficient for happiness. Here his opinion coincides largely with the Stoic view, more so than in some of his other works such as De Finibus written shortly before. Virtue is entirely sufficient for a happy life under all possible circumstances: in poverty, in exile, in blindness, in deafness, even under torture. Happiness and misery depend on character and are independent of circumstances, and Virtue is the source of all in this earthly life that is worth living for.

== Other themes ==
The work contains frequent allusion to ancient fable, the events of Greek and Roman history, and the memorable sayings of heroes and sages. Cicero references also the ancient Latin poets and quotes from their works. The Tusculan Disputations is the locus classicus of the legend of the Sword of Damocles, as well as of the sole mention of cultura animi as an agricultural metaphor for human culture. Cicero also mentions disapprovingly Amafinius, one of the first Latin writers on philosophy in Rome.

== Influence ==
The rhetor's theme De contemptu mundi, on the contempt of the world, was taken up by Boethius in the troubled closing phase of Late Antiquity and by Bernard of Cluny in the first half of the 12th century.

The book was an influence on Saint Augustine. For instance he references it in his Confessions, and also in The City of God.

Thomas Jefferson included the "Tusculan questions", along with Cicero's De Officiis, in his list of recommendations to Robert Skipwith of books for a general personal library.
