= William Drury (disambiguation) =

William Drury (1527–1579) was an English statesman and soldier.

William Drury may also refer to:

- William Drury (died 1558) (c. 1500–1558), Speaker of the House of Commons
- William Drury (MP for Suffolk) (1550–1590), English landowner and member of parliament
- William Drury (lawyer) (died 1589), Elizabethan jurist
- William Drury (dramatist) (fl. 1641), English dramatist
- William James Joseph Drury (1791–1878), English cleric and schoolmaster
- William Price Drury (1861–1949), Royal Marine Light Infantry officer, novelist, playwright, and mayor of Saltash
- William O'Bryen Drury (died 1811), officer of the British Royal Navy
- William Drury Lowe (1802–1877), English landowner
