= Emmanuel Lobb =

Emmanuel Lobb (1594–1671), pseudonyms Joseph Simons or Simeon, was an English Jesuit and dramatist. He is chiefly remembered for converting the future King James II to the Roman Catholic faith.

== Life ==
Born at Portsmouth, Lobb was at age of 11 sent to Portugal to learn the language for commerce, and there was converted to the Roman Catholic faith by Henry Floyd. He was sent to St Omer College, and then entered the English College at Rome under the assumed name of Joseph Simeon, on 13 October 1616. Having received minor orders in 1617, he left Rome for Belgium on 14 September 1619, and was received into the Society of Jesus at Liège.

Lobb was professed of the four vows on 25 January 1632–3. After teaching rhetoric and belles-lettres at St Omer College for five years, he became professor of theology, philosophy, and sacred scripture in the English theologate of the Society of Jesus at Liège. In 1647 he was appointed rector of the English College at Rome, and in 1650 rector of the theologate at Liège. He was also instructor of the tertian fathers at Ghent.

Later sent on the English mission, Lobb was at one period rector of the College of St. Ignatius. In 1667 he became the Jesuit English provincial. When residing in London in 1669 he was consulted by James, Duke of York, whom he subsequently reconciled to the Roman Catholic church, although the precise details of James' conversion are unknown, due to a highly effective Government "black-out".

Lobb died in London on 24 July 1671.

== Works ==
Lobb was the author of the following verse tragedies, all in five acts:

- Zeno, Tragœdia, Rome, 1648, Antwerp, n.d.
- Mercia, Tragœdia, Rome, 1648.
- Theoctitus sive constans in Aula virtus, Liège, n.d.
- Tragœdiæ quinque, quarum duæ postremæ nunc primum lucem vident, Liège, 1657; Cologne, 1680 and 1697. The two additional pieces, mentioned in the title were Vitus, sive Christiana fortitudo and Leo Armenus, sive Impietas punita. These tragedies were often acted in Italy and Spain.

Thomas Blount ascribed to Lobb, at the time, an Answer to Dr. Pierce's Sermon preached before his Majesty 1 Feb. 1663. By J. S., London, 1663; others give the authorship to John Sergeant.

== See also ==
- Jesuit drama

== Notes ==
Catholic Church titles
Preceded by John Clarke	Provincial superior of the English; Province of the Society of Jesus; 14 November 1667-22 May 1671	Succeeded by George Gray
