= John Floyd (Jesuit) =

English Jesuit controversialist (1572–1649)

John Floyd (1572 – 15 September 1649) was an English Jesuit, known as a controversialist. He is known under the pseudonyms Daniel à Jesu, Hermannus Loemelius, and George White (also Annosus Fidelis Verimentanus, Flud, and the initials J. R.) under which he published.

He was known both as a preacher and teacher, and was frequently arrested in England.

== Life ==
He was a brother of Henry Floyd, and was born in Cambridgeshire in 1572. After studying in the school of the English Jesuits at Eu, Normandy, he was admitted on 17 March 1588 to the English College, Reims, where he studied humanities and philosophy. Next he went to the English College, Rome, admitted there 9 October 1590, and joined the Society of Jesus on 1 November 1592.

On 18 August 1593 Floyd received minor orders, at Reims or Douai, and on the 22nd of the same month he was sent back to the English College at Rome with nine companions, where he taught philosophy and theology, and became known as a preacher. In 1609 he became a professed father of the Jesuit order.

He worked for a long time on the English mission. Having visited Edward Oldcorne in Worcester gaol in 1606, he was detained, and he was unable either by entreaties or bribes to escape Sir John Popham. After a year's imprisonment he was sent into exile with forty-six other priests, and he spent four years in preaching at St. Omer and composing controversial works. Then he returned to England, where he was often captured, and frequently contrived to pay off the pursuivants.

His last years were spent at Leuven, where he was professor of theology. He died suddenly at St. Omer on 15 September 1649.

== Works ==
Floyd wrote the following works, some of which appeared under pseudonyms:

- The Overthrow of the Protestants Pulpit-Babels, convincing their Preachers of Lying and Rayling, to make the Church of Rome seeme mysticall Babell [St. Omer], 1612. This contains an answer to The Jesuites Gospell, by William Crashaw, published in 1610. By "J. R., Student in Divinity", it has been ascribed to Robert Jenison. In reply to this or some other work by Floyd, Sir Edward Hoby wrote A Counter-Snarle for Ishmael Rabshakeh, a Cecropedian Lycaonite, being an Answer to a Roman Catholic, who writes himself J. R., London, 1613.
- Purgatories Triumph over Hell, maugre the barking of Cerberus in Syr Edward Hobyes Counter-Snarle. Described in a Letter to the said Knight, from J. R., authour of the Answere unto the Protestants Pulpit-Babels, 1613; to which Hoby replied in a book entitled Curry-comb for a Coxcombe, 1615.
- Synopsis Apostasiæ Marci Antonii de Dominis, olim Archiepiscopi Spalatensis, nunc apostatæ, ex ipsiusmet libro delineata, Antwerp, 1617, translated into English by Father Henry Hawkins, St. Omer, 1617, and again edited by John Fletcher, London 1828.
- Hypocrisis M. A. de Dominis detecta, seu censura in ejus libros de Republica Ecclesiastica, Antwerp, 1620.
- Censura X Librorum de Republica Ecclesiastica M.A. de Dominis, Antwerp, 1620; Cologne, 1621.
- God and the King; or a Dialogue wherein is treated of Allegiance due to ... K. James within his Dominions, which (by removing all Controversies and Causes of Dissentions and Suspitions) bindeth Subjects by an inviolable band of Love and Duty to their Soveraigne, translated from the Latin, Cologne, 1620. This was a parody, Latin original (1619) Deus et rex, of the work of the same title (1615) usually attributed to Richard Mocket.
- St. Augustine's Meditations, translated, St. Omer, 1621, Paris, 1655.
- Monarchiæ Ecclesiasticæ ex scriptis M. Antonii de Dominis ... Demonstratio, duobus libris comprehensa, seu Respublica Ecclesiastica M. Ant. de Dominis, per ipsum a fundamentis eversa, Cologne, 1622.
- A Word of Comfort; or a Discourse concerning the late lamentable Accident of the Fall of a Roome at a Catholike Sermon in the Black-Friars at London, wherewith about fore-score persons were oppressed ... By J. R. P., St. Omer, 1623. This work relates to the Fatal Vespers.
- Of the Sacrifice of the Mass, translated from the Spanish of Antonio de Molina, St. Omer, 1623.
- On the Real Presence, St. Omer, 1624.
- An Answer to Francis White's [White was successively bishop of Norwich and Ely] Reply to Mr. Fisher's Answer to the Nine Articles offered by King James to Father John Fisher, S. J., St. Omer, 1625. Francis Mason replied to Floyd in the second edition of his Vindiciæ Ecclesiæ Anglicanæ, 1625.
- An Apology of the Holy Sea Apostolicks Proceedings for the Government of the Catholicks of England during the tyme of persecution. With a Defence of a Religious State, written by Daniel of Jesus, Rouen, 1630. The first part is translated from the French. An enlarged Latin edition was published at Cologne and St. Omer in 1631. This work relates to the disputes between the Jesuits and the secular priests in the matter of the episcopacy. It drew down the censure of the theological faculty of the Sorbonne on its author, who replied with Spongia below.
- A Paire of Spectacles for Sir Humphrey Linde to see his way withall; or, an Answeare to his booke called Via Tuta, a Safe Way, s.l. 1631. This has been sometimes attributed to Robert Jenison. Humphrey Lynde's Via Tuta, 1628, was answered more fully by John Heigham.
- Hermanni Loemelii ... Spongia quâ diluuntur Calumniæ nomine Facultatis Parisiensis impositæ libro qui inscribitur Apologia Sanctæ Sedis Apostolicæ circa Regimen Catholicorum Angliæ, St. Omer, 1631. A rejoinder was published on the part of the Sorbonne.Joseph Gillow gives a list of the principal books occasioned by Floyd's works against Richard Smith, bishop of Chalcedon, and the French clergy who supported him.
- Answer to a Book intituled "Instructions for the Catholicks of England".
- The Church Conquerant over Human Wit, St. Omer, 1638, a reply to William Chillingworth's Religion of Protestants.
- The Total Summ, St. Omer, 1638, reprinted in 1639 with The Judgment of an University Man on Mr. Chillingworth's Book, by Father William Lacy.
- The Imposture of Puritan Piety, St. Omer, 1639.
- A Treatise on Holy Pictures.
- Vita Brunehildis, Francorum Reginæ, liber primus, manuscript folio, at St. Omer. It was cited by Bollandus in his notes to the life of St. Nicet, bishop of Besançon, under 8 February.
