= Robert Drury (Jesuit) =

Robert Drury (1587–1623) was an English Jesuit.

== Biography ==
Drury was born in 1587 in Middlesex, Kingdom of England, son of William Drury, D.C.L., judge of the prerogative court (who was converted to the Catholic faith in articulo mortis), and his wife, Mary, daughter of Sir Richard Southwell of Woodrising, Norfolk, a relative of Father Robert Southwell the poet. He was educated in London, and at the age of fourteen was sent to the English College at Douay, where he began his course of humanities, which he completed at St. Omer.

On 9 October 1605 he entered the English College, Rome, for his higher course. After receiving minor orders he joined the Society of Jesus in October 1608, and subsequently he repaired to Posna to finish his theology, arriving there 28 February 1611–12. In 1620 he was rector of the college at St. Omer, and afterwards was sent on the mission to his native country, where he became a distinguished preacher. He was professed of the four vows 8 September 1622. Occasionally he went under the names of Bedford and Stanley.

He lost his life on Sunday, 5 November (N.S.) 1623, at the Fatal Vespers in Blackfriars.

== Works ==
There is a eulogium of Drury in the preface to a book called F. Robert Drury's Reliquary (1624), containing his prayers and devotions. Stow says that he was reputed by his fellow-churchmen to be a man of great learning, and generally admitted to be of good moral life.
