= Jesuit drama =

Jesuit drama was a form of theatre practised in the colleges of the Society of Jesus between the 16th and 18th centuries, as a way of instructing students in rhetoric, assimilating Christian values and imparting Catholic doctrine.

== History ==
In the late 16th and early 17th centuries, Jesuit colleges spread across Europe, and almost all of these presented at least one play each year. The first recorded performance was in 1551, at the College Mamertino at Messina, in Sicily, but by the mid-17th centuries, several hundred plays were being performed annually. The Ratio Studiorum of 1599 made it mandatory for Jesuit schools to exercise their students in rhetorical self-expression through dramas, debates, and other declamation of poetry. This effort to improve training in Latin for priests and other religious entrants was a central feature of the Counter Reformation, following the Humanist emphasis of understanding and standardisation of Latin towards Classical standards, now known as Neo-Latin.

As Jesuit drama expanded, it also evolved, becoming more elaborate. The earliest plays were performed in Latin, without any female characters or costumes. The primary aim was to improve oral Latin skills, alongside religious education.

Later, performances were frequently given in the vernacular, and they became important social events in the towns where the colleges were established. By public requests the dramatic representations had often to be staged a second or third time.

As Jesuit drama became more extravagant, these productions were increasingly criticised. These criticisms focused on the cost of the plays and their exaggerated place in the curriculum of certain Jesuit colleges. These criticisms added to the already growing anti-Jesuit sentiment in the 18th century, which resulted in the banning of Jesuit drama in many areas. Performances ceased in 1773, with the suppression of the Society of Jesus, but were revived, after the restoration of the Society in 1814.

== Content ==
Jesuit dramas, as well as instructing students in correct language use and oratory skills, served as a means of instruction in Roman Catholic doctrine and values, for both the students and the audience. The plays were therefore based on accounts from the Bible, or saintly legends.

Most pieces of Jesuit drama contained music of some form. These musical elements were particularly elaborate in Austria and southern Germany, as well as in France where ballet was often included in Jesuit productions.

== Examples ==
- Ambrosia by Edmund Campion
- Histoire tragique de la pucelle de Domrémy by Fronton du Duc
- Sigeris, Tragœdia by Bandino Gualfreducci
- Cenodoxus by Jacob Bidermann
- Hippolito, Edipo and Ermenegildo by Emanuele Tesauro
- Zeno by Joseph Simons
- Sarcotis by Jacob Masen
- Rubenus by Mario Bettinus
- Ermenegildo martire by Francesco Sforza Pallavicino
- Pietas victrix by Nicola Avancini

== See also ==
- Academic drama

== Sources ==
- Zanlonghi, Louis J.; Yanitelli, Victor R. (1999). "Jesuit Theater in Italy: Its Entrances and Exit". Italica. 76 (1): 18–32. JSTOR 479800.
- John Gassner and Edward Quinn (eds.), The Reader's Encyclopedia of World Drama (2002)
- Knight, Sarah; Tilg, Stefan, eds. (2015). The Oxford Handbook of Neo-Latin. New York: Oxford University Press. ISBN 9780190886998. OL 28648475M.
- Ford, Philip, Jan Bloemendal, and Charles Fantazzi, eds. 2014. Brill's Encyclopaedia of the Neo-Latin World. Two vols. Leiden, The Netherlands: Brill.
- Moul, Victoria, ed. (2017). A Guide to Neo-Latin Literature. Cambridge, United Kingdom: Cambridge University Press. ISBN 9781108820066. OL 29875053M.
- Waquet, Françoise (2001). Latin, or the Empire of a Sign: From the Sixteenth to the Twentieth Centuries. Translated by John Howe. Verso. ISBN 1-85984-402-2.
- Zanlonghi, Giovanna (2006). "The Jesuit Stage and Theatre in Milan during the Eighteenth Century". The Jesuits II. Cultures, Sciences, and the Arts. University of Toronto Press. doi:10.3138/9781442681552-032.
