= Francesco Sforza Pallavicino =

Italian Catholic cardinal and philosopher (1607–1667)

His Eminence Francesco Sforza Pallavicino
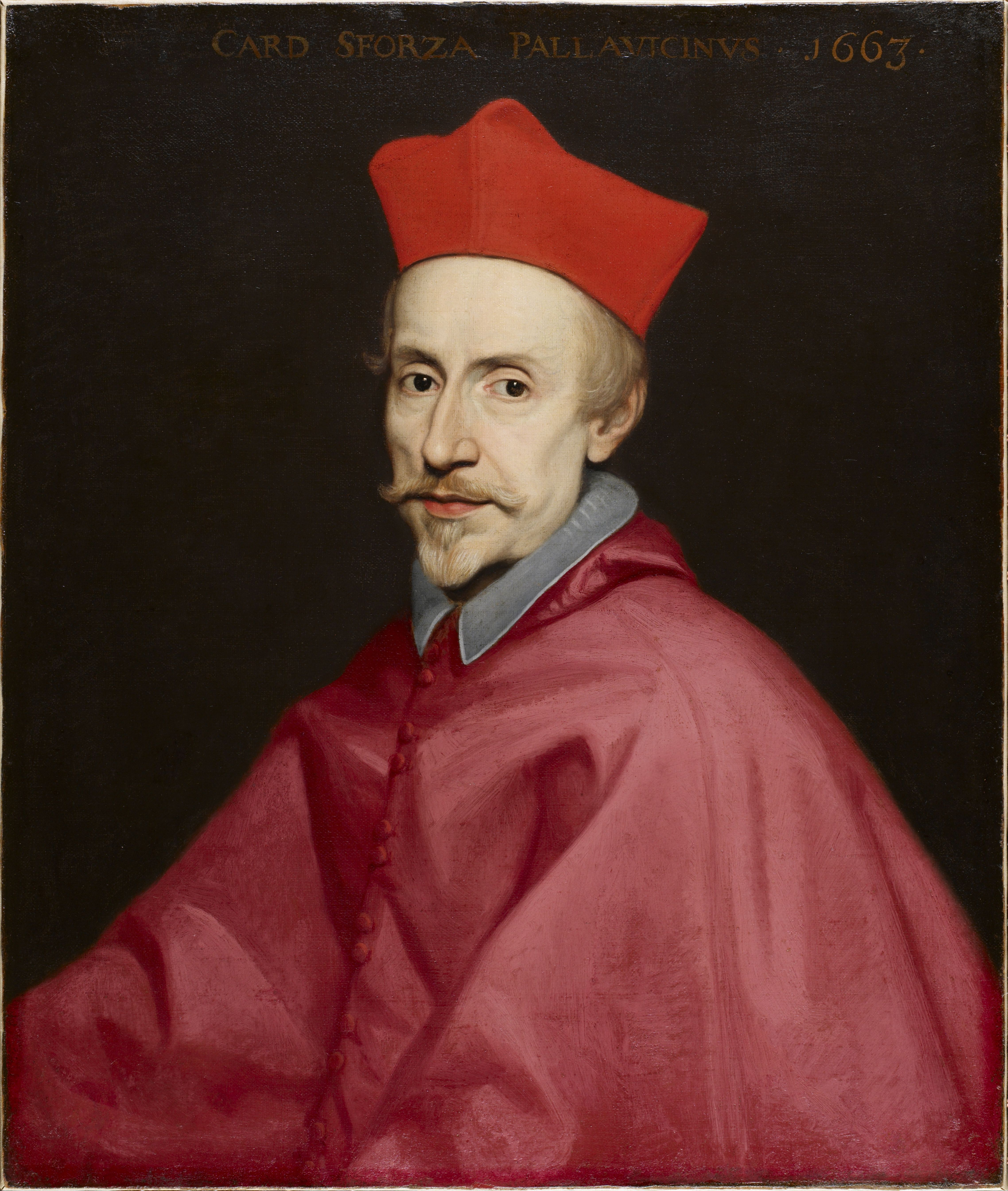
- Attributed to Giovanni Maria Morandi, 1663 portrait of Cardinal Pallavicino
- Diocese: Diocese of Rome
- Appointed: 9 April 1657
- Term ended: 4 June 1667

Orders
- Created cardinal: 9 April 1657 by Pope Alexander VII
- Rank: Cardinal-Priest of San Salvatore in Lauro

Personal details
- Born: November 28, 1607 Rome, Papal States
- Died: 4 June 1667 (aged 59) Rome
- Buried: Sant'Andrea al Quirinale
- Denomination: Roman Catholic
- Parents: Alessandro Pallavicino; Francesca Sforza di Santa Fiora
- Education: Roman College

Education
- Education: Roman College (Ph.D., 1625; D.Th. 1628)
- Doctoral advisor: Juan de Lugo

Philosophical work
- Era: Baroque philosophy
- Region: Western philosophy; Italian philosophy
- School: Aristotelianism; Scholasticism; Conceptualism
- Institutions: Roman College
- Notable students: Sylvester Maurus; Paolo Segneri
- Main interests: Natural philosophy, metaphysics, epistemology, aesthetics
- Coat of arms

Francesco Maria Sforza Pallavicino or Pallavicini SJ (28 November 1607 – 4 June 1667), was an Italian cardinal, philosopher, theologian, literary theorist, and church historian.

A professor of philosophy and theology at the Roman College and a fixture of important academies such as the Accademia dei Lincei and the Academy of Prince Maurice of Savoy, Pallavicino was the author of several highly influential philosophical and theological treatises (praised among others by Gottfried Wilhelm Leibniz, Benedetto Croce and Eugenio Garin) and of a well-known history of the Council of Trent that remained authoritative until the late 19th century.

== Early life and family ==
Pallavicino was born in Rome on November 28, 1607. He was the firstborn son of Marquis Alessandro Pallavicino and his second wife, Francesca Sforza di Santa Fiora, widow of Ascanio della Penna della Cornia. He belonged to the Parma branch of the ancient and noble Pallavicini family.

He was baptised with the names Francesco Maria Sforza, but in all of his published works throughout his life, he only gave Sforza as his first name, which is also the only first name inscribed on his tomb in the Church of Sant'Andrea al Quirinale in Rome; Sforza is also the only name used universally by his contemporaries. The name Sforza was in honor of Sforza Pallavicino, a famous Italian condottiero, Captain-General of the Republic of Venice, who had adopted Marquis Alessandro, leaving him all his wealth and titles. An eldest son, he renounced the right of primogeniture and entered the priesthood.

== Career ==
Pallavicino studied literature, philosophy, and jurisprudence at the Roman College, and received his doctorate in philosophy in 1625 at the age of eighteen. His thesis, De Universa philosophia, was printed in the same year in the presses of Francesco Corbelletti. Soon afterward, Pallavicino started studying theology in the same college under John de Lugo, earning his doctorate in 1628.

The young Pallavicino was soon introduced to the leaders of Roman cultural life. He was elected Member of the Accademia degli Umoristi and became friends with the poet Virginio Cesarini and with some of the most prominent personalities of Italian Baroque, including Agostino Mascardi, Fulvio Testi, John Barclay and Giulio Strozzi. Alessandro Tassoni praised him in a verse of his mock-heroic poem La secchia rapita. Federico Cesi portrayed him as a child prodigy, whose great ingegno ("ingegno grande"), relentless will ("volontà indefessa"), and his familiarity with writing ("l'amicitia stretta della penna") held promise "of even greater things" ("di cose tuttavia maggiori") in the future.

An ardent supporter of Galileo, on 27 January 1629, Pallavicino became a Member of the Accademia dei Lincei, together with Lucas Holstenius and Pietro della Valle. Following Ciampoli's guide Pallavicino started an open and harsh struggle against Aristotelianism. After Federico Cesi's death in 1630, he was taken under consideration as his successor for the presidency of the Academy. According to Pietro Redondi, Pallavicino played a part in delaying, or deflecting, Orazio Grassi's attack against the atomistic argument in Galileo's Assayer.

In 1630, he took minor orders. Soon afterwards, the Pope Urban VIII appointed him referendary of the Tribunals of the Apostolic Signatures of Justice and of Grace and member of the Congregatio boni regiminis and of the Congregatio immunitatis, assigning him a pension of 250 scudi.

When his friend Giovanni Ciampoli, the secretary of briefs, fell into disfavour, Pallavicino's standing at the papal court was also seriously affected. In 1632, he was sent to govern the provincial towns of Iesi, Orvieto, and Camerino. In contrast with Ciampoli, who died in Iesi in 1643 without ever having set foot again in Rome, Pallavicino returned there in 1636.

Over his father's objections, he entered the Society of Jesus on 21 June 1637. After the two years' novitiate he became professor of philosophy at the Roman College. In 1643, when John de Lugo was made a cardinal, Pallavicino succeeded him in the chair of theology, a position he held until 1651 while also fulfilling assignments for Pope Innocent X. He was appointed member of the commission that examined the writings of Cornelius Jansen and Martin de Barcos, which resulted in the condemnation of two works by de Barcos in 1647. Sforza Pallavicino was a staunch opponent of Jansenism and a vocal supporter of the Jesuit theological tradition, and while he certainly did not oppose probabilism, which he taught in his earlier scholarly career, he did not condone its most radical outcomes either.

== Cardinal Pallavicino ==
Pope Alexander VII created Pallavicino cardinal in pectore in his first creation on 9 April 1657. His appointment was made public in March 1650. He received the red hat and the title of San Salvatore in Lauro on December 6, 1660. He was also appointed examiner of the bishops, and soon afterwards a member of the Congregation of the Holy Office. As the master of the Jesuit novitiate on the Quirinal, Pallavicino was closely involved in planning the church of Sant'Andrea al Quirinale, designed by Gian Lorenzo Bernini from 1658 onwards.

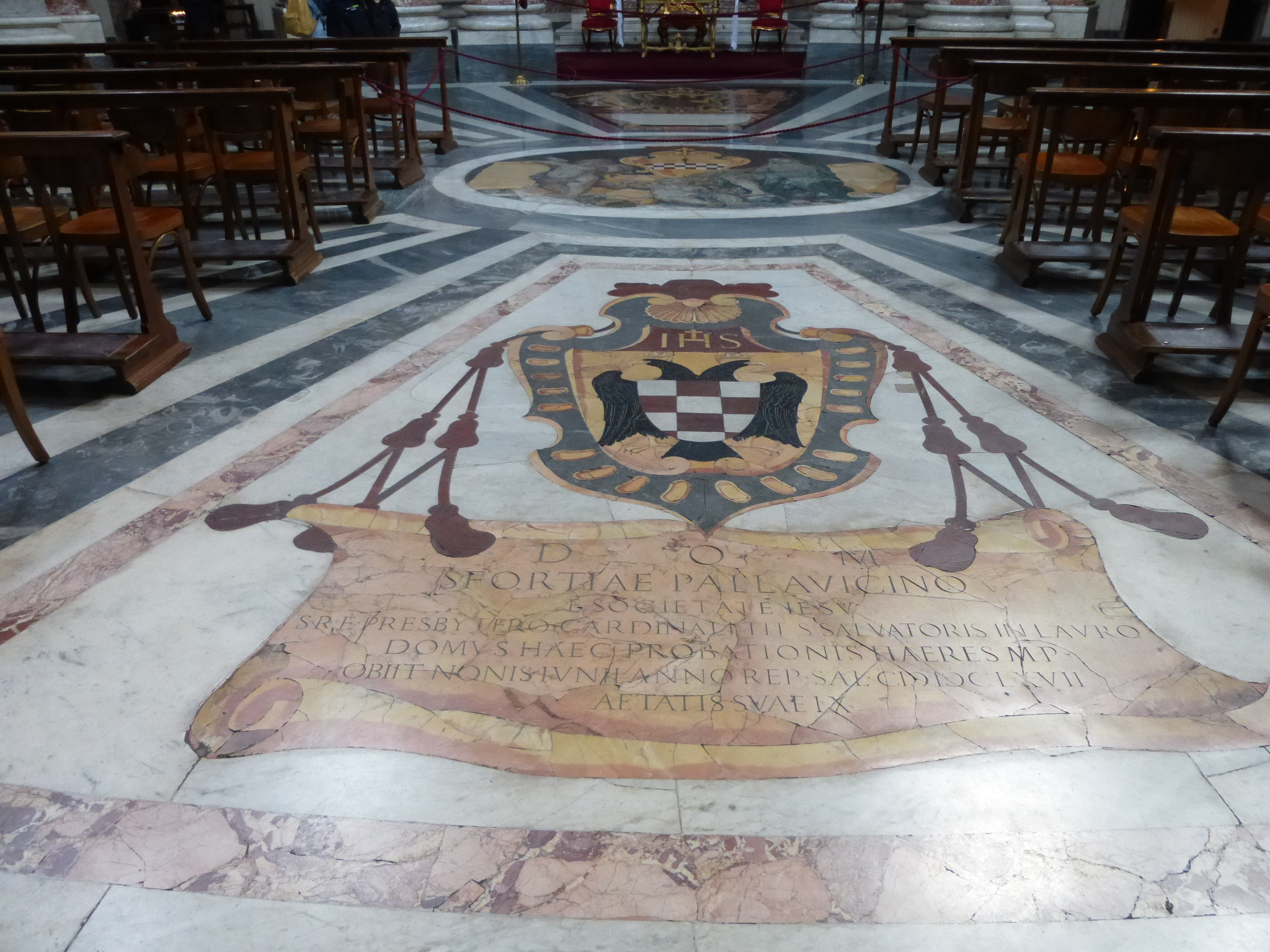
The tomb of Cardinal Francesco Sforza Pallavicino in the Church of Sant'Andrea al Quirinale, Rome

In his later years, Pallavicino played an active role in Italian cultural life. He became a member of the so-called pleias alessandrina, the international network of Neo-Latin poets gathered around Alexander VII. He warmly endorsed the activities of the Accademia del Cimento and took part to them. Leopoldo de' Medici entrusted him with the stylistic revision of the academy's sole publication, the Saggi di naturali esperienze. On 3 February 1665 he entered the Accademia della Crusca, an association of scholars and writers devoted to the Italian language. The cardinal was a loyal protector of Gian Lorenzo Bernini's interests in Rome and with the French court, as well as mentor to his oldest son, Pietro Filippo. A late portrait of Pallavicino in red chalk on buff paper by Bernini is in the Yale University Art Gallery.

Owing to ill health Pallavicino could not participate in the conclave of 1667, which elected Pope Clement IX; he died in his room in the Jesuit house of Sant'Andrea al Quirinale on 5 June 1667, at the age of 59. His pupil Sylvester Maurus assisted him on his deathbed. According to the provisions of his last will and testament, Pallavicino was buried in the church of Sant'Andrea al Quirinale. He was entombed under a magnificent slab designed by baroque architect Mattia de Rossi.

== History of the Council of Trent ==
Istoria del Concilio di Trento (1656–1657)

Pallavicino is chiefly known by his History of the Council of Trent, a harsh if well researched rebuttal to Paolo Sarpi's Istoria del Concilio Tridentino. The work was published at Rome in two folio volumes in 1656 and 1657 (2nd ed., considerably modified, in 1666). Several potential candidates had been taken under consideration for the onerous task of correcting and superseding the very damaging work of Sarpi. According to an unpublished account by the custodian of the papal archives Felice Contelori (1588–1652), these were Girolamo Aleandro, secretary to Cardinal Francesco Barberini, the historian Agostino Mascardi, the ex-Jesuit Francesco Herrera, Giovanni Ciampoli and Felice Contelori himself. The Jesuit Terenzio Alciati had been eventually chosen for the task by Pope Urban VIII. In early 1652, a few months after Alciati's death, Pallavicino took over Alciati's task.

Alciati had access to the original acts of the Council of Trent deposited in the Archives of Castello, Archivum Arcis (Castel Sant'Angelo). Together Felice Contelori, Alciati collected and catalogued a huge amount of unpublished sources. Pallavicino draws on not only the sources collected over decades by P. Alciati, but also directly on the Latin manuscript of Alciati's unfinished and unpublished history Pseudo historia Concilii Tridentini refutata. In addition to these sources Pallavicino continued searching the vast holdings of the Roman archives for documentary materials relating to the Council of Trent. Fabio Chigi, an old friend of Pallavicino, gave him liberal access to the acts of the council and other important documents preserved in the Vatican Apostolic Archive. Pallavicino read and made use of historical authors such as Johannes Sleidanus, Francesco Guicciardini, Paolo Giovio, Nicholas Sanders, François de Beaucaire (1514–1591), and Florimond de Raemond. Thanks to the preparatory work by Alciati, as well as his own research, he was able to cite a large array of printed and unpublished documentary sources on the Council of Trent.

Pallavicino's History exposed Sarpi's bias and inaccuracy and marked an advance in the collection and use of original documents. According to the great nineteenth-century historian Leopold von Ranke, who examined many of the manuscript sources from which Pallavicino drew his materials, the extracts he has made from the instructions and other official documents are "scrupulously exact" and he has "carefully consulted the whole of the documents". Until the twentieth century, Pallavicino's History of the Council of Trent was the principal work on this important ecclesiastical assembly. It was appreciated even by Protestant scholars: Algernon Sidney, who knew Pallavicino at Rome, commends the work in a letter to his father, Lord Leicester. Pallavicino's History was translated into Latin by a fellow Jesuit, Giovanni Battista Giattini (Antwerp, 1670–1673), into French by Joseph-Epiphane Darras (Migne series, Paris, 1844–1845); into Spanish by Juan Nepomuceno Lobo, Antolín Monescillo, and Manuel M. Negueruela (Madrid, 1846) and into German by Theodor Friedrich Klitsche de la Grange (1835–1837). There is a good edition of the original by Francesco Antonio Zaccaria (6 vols., Faenza, 1792–1799).

The codex used by Sforza Pallavicino to write his Istoria is preserved in the Archives of the Pontifical Gregorian University (APUG).

=== Original publication ===
- Pallavicino, Sforza (1656). Istoria del concilio di Trento. Parte prima. In Roma: nella stamperia d'Angelo Bernabò dal Verme erede del Manelfi : per Giovanni Casoni libraro.
- Pallavicino, Sforza (1657). Istoria del concilio di Trento. Parte seconda. In Roma: nella stamperia d'Angelo Bernabò dal Verme erede del Manelfi : per Giovanni Casoni libraro.

== Other works ==
=== Literary works ===
Before his entrance into the Jesuit order Pallavicino had published orations and poems. His great poem I fasti sacri, an imitation of Ovid's Fasti celebrating the main Christian feast days, was left unfinished upon his entrance into the novitiate. Pallavicino's Fasti were praised by Ludovico Antonio Muratori, Giovanni Mario Crescimbeni, and Francesco Saverio Quadrio.

His first considerable literary work as Jesuit was a tragedy, Ermenegildo martire, a masterpiece of seventeenth-century Jesuit drama. It was published in 1644 after the first of several performances at the Jesuit Seminario Romano.

The tragedy narrates the last day in the life of St. Hermenegild, who converted to the Catholic faith and rebelled against his father, the Arian Visigoth King Liuvigild, and whose defeat, exile, and death were celebrated as a martyrdom in the struggle against Arianism.

Pallavicino's postscript to the play elucidates the author's views on theatre, its rules, and its functions as a pedagogical tool. While contemporary secular plays and operas played to an uneducated crowd that wanted to be amazed by scenic effects, the unspectacular theatre of Sforza Pallavicino aspired to educate by providing the public with strong and exemplary characters to emulate. Pallavicino identifies the true function of the tragic genre in the fortification of honesty and morality in the audience. He believes that the plot of the tragedy is the foundation on which its success should rely. His disdain for deus ex machina characters, personifications of moral and allegorical qualities, supernatural events, and asides, choruses and messengers as devices to provide information, fully represents his belief that the dramatist should build dramatic action on detailed and verisimilar situations. According to Pallavicino «wonder without verisimilitude is easily achieved and gives no pleasure except perhaps that of laughter to those who hear the plot, nor does it merit the name of poetry». In clear opposition to the taste of Marino and his followers, Pallavicino suggests looking at classical writers to see how verisimilitude can convey a feeling of wonder. Unlike the baroque writers of the time who thought that precious style could make the reader forget about any violation of verisimilitude, Pallavicino affirms that classic decorum and good taste, the very foundation of verisimilitude, can convey the feeling of marvel to the public.

=== Theological and philosophical works ===
In 1649, Pallavicino began the publication of his great dogmatic work in conjunction with his theological lectures, Assertiones theologicae. The complete work treats the entire field of dogma in nine books. The first five books appeared in three volumes (Rome, 1649), the remaining four books are included in volumes IV—VIII (Rome, 1650–1652). Immediately after this he began the publication of disputations on the second part of the Summa Theologica of Thomas Aquinas, R. P. Sfortiae Pallavicini. Disputationum in Iam IIae d. Thomae tomus I (Lyons, 1653). Pallavicino attempted to reconcile Aristotle with the new science. His Christian Aristotelianism did not keep him from calling himself a follower of Galileo ("Galileista"), and expressing his esteem for Tommaso Campanella. He endorsed Cartesian dualism, though he did not approve of the Cartesian interpretation of the Cogito.

In 1649, Pallavicino published his Vindicationes Societatis Jesu, a circumstantial refutation of the numerous accusations raised against the Society of Jesus. But Pallavicino did more than respond to the criticism of the Society of Jesus; he included several passages presenting his own view of the ideal intellectual environment within the Society. The Vindicationes have been considered a manifesto of the progressive current within the Jesuit order. Pallavicino refuted the need for strict adherence to Aristotelianism and Thomism in all aspects of natural philosophy, because much of what Aristotle had stated had been shown to be false. It was "ridiculous" to forbid discussion of new questions, as if nothing new could ever arise in philosophy.

Although almost forgotten today outside scholarly circles, Pallavicino is considered by some as one of the missing links between scholastic theology and early modern philosophy.

True to his Galileian leanings, Pallavicino edited the first, posthumous editions of Giovanni Ciampoli's Rime (1648) and Prose (1649), in an attempt to restore his friend's reputation. A work of ascetic character, Arte della perfezione cristiana, divisa in tre libri, appeared in 1665 (Rome). In the Trattato dello stile e del dialogo (A treatise on style and dialogue), first published in 1646 (under a slightly different title) and revised for the final time in 1662, Pallavicno endorses a neo-Aristotelian ideal of dialogue as a pleasant form of instruction.

Pallavicino's treatise Del bene libri quattro, a dialogue in four books between prominent members of the Barberini circles (Rome 1644 and often reprinted), has been praised by the Italian philosopher Benedetto Croce for its contribution to the development of modern aesthetics. Leibniz, who was familiar with the work of Sforza Pallavicino, quoted this book with high esteem. When he visited Rome in 1689, he regretted that Pallavicino had died as he would have loved to have met the Jesuit and conversed with him. Leibniz's friend Franciscus Mercurius van Helmont (1618–1699) appreciated Pallavicino's philosophy too. Richard Cumberland in his treatise De legibus naturae disquisitio philosophica (London, 1672) borrowed a great deal from Pallavicino's Del bene.

=== Posthumous works ===
Several of Pallavicino's works were not printed until later; others are still in manuscript. An opinion which he had written on the question whether it was most appropriate that the pope live in Rome at St. Peter's, was printed together with a discussion of the same question by his fellow Lincean Lucas Holstenius, in Rome (1776). Larger collections of various works of Pallavicino were brought out as late as the nineteenth century. His biography of Alexander VII, written in close collaboration with the pope himself, was published posthumously in 1839–40 as Della vita di Alessandro VII.

== Correspondence networks and published letters ==
In the year after Pallavicino's death, his former secretary, Giambattista Galli Pavarelli, published a collection of his letters, Lettere dettate dal card. Sforza Pallavicino (Rome, 1668). Other collections appeared in Bologna (1669), in Venice (1825), in Rome (4 vols., 1848). His extensive network of correspondents included Fabio Chigi, the future Pope Alexander VII, the scientist Carlo Roberto Dati, and Philip IV's official historian Virgilio Malvezzi.

== Legacy ==
Pallavicino's life was first recounted in a laudatory biography by the noted eighteenth-century scholar Ireneo Affò and much of our information about him comes from this. Affò's life was picked up by Francesco Antonio Zaccaria (1714–1795), who included an expanded version of the biography in his edition of the Istoria del Concilio di Trento (1792–1797). A eulogy of Pallavicino was written by Pietro Giordani as a premise to Perfezione cristiana in the edition of Pallavicino's works published in Milan in 1820. Giordani emphasised the literary qualities of Pallavicino's work, positioning and comparing him to contemporaries such as Virgilio Malvezzi, Daniello Bartoli, Paolo Segneri, Giovanni Battista Doni and Galileo.

In his history of aesthetics, Benedetto Croce singled out Pallavicino as a major Italian seventeenth century literary theorist and argued that Pallavicino's writings contained a historically important kernel of aesthetic considerations that suggested that mimetic art is concerned with its expressive qualities rather than the constraint of verisimilitude imposed by the legacy of Aristotle. Pallavicino was highly praised by Italy's leading historian of philosophy Eugenio Garin, who called him "one of the more lucid minds of the seventeenth century".

When authors like Giovanni Getto, Carlo Calcattera, Guido Morburgo-Tagliabue, Franco Croce, Ezio Raimondi and Mario Costanzo reevaluated Italian baroque literature, Pallavicino's oeuvre emerged as a point of reference for the so-called "moderate baroque", authors who attempted to ground the formal innovations of poets like Giambattista Marino in a more reasoned and religiously inspired approach to literary invention. Pallavicino distances himself from the two Baroque extremes, marinism and conceptismo, aligning himself with the Ciceronian position, as held by Agostino Mascardi.

== Selected works ==
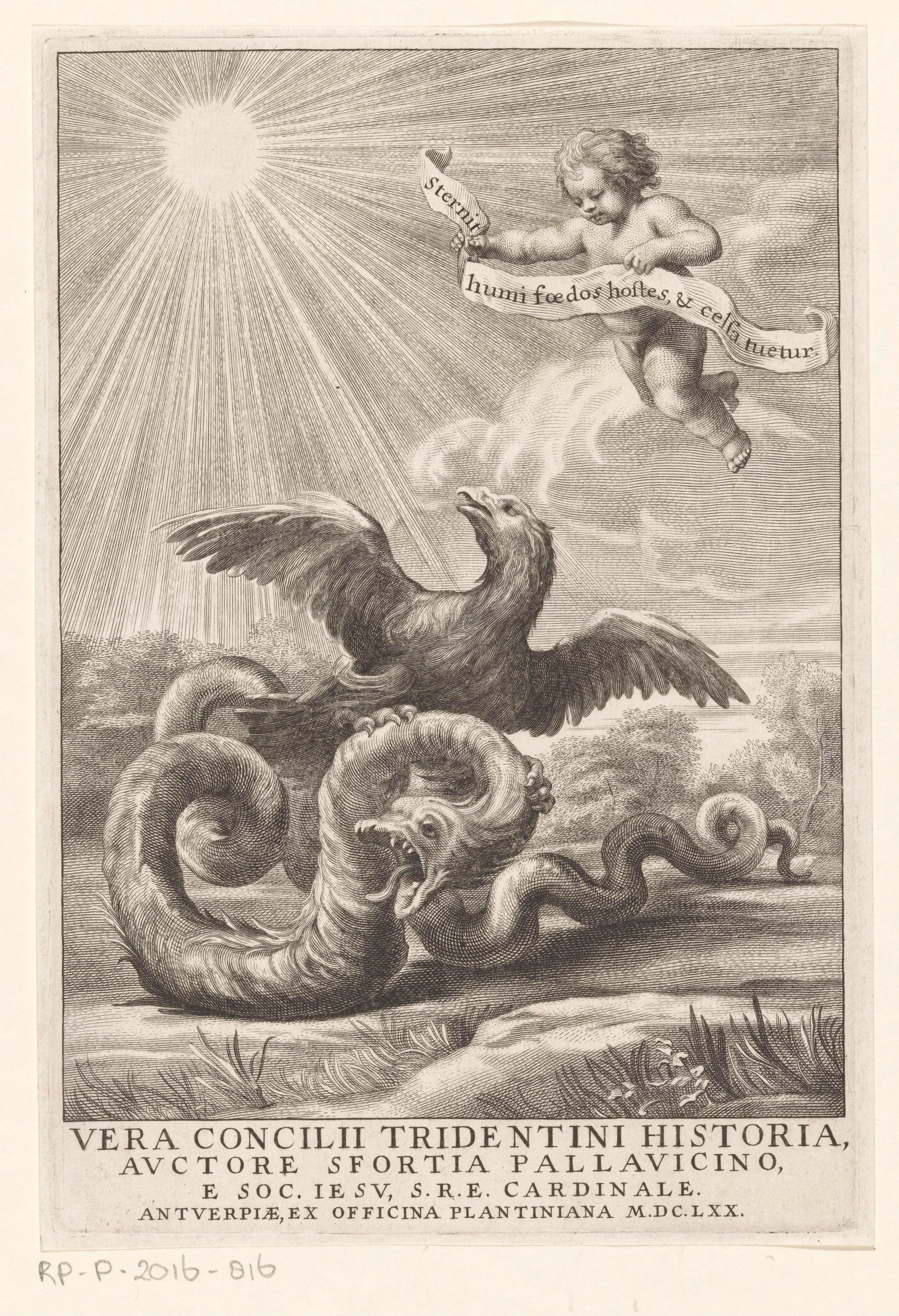
Vera concilii tridentini historia. Antwerp: Plantin Press, 1670.

- Apollonio, Silvia, ed. (2015). I fasti sacri. Lecce: Argo. ISBN 978-88-8234-130-5.
- De universa philosophia. Rome: Corbelletti. 1625.
- Ermenegildo martire. Rome: per gli eredi del Corbelletti. 1644.
- Del bene libri quattro. Rome: per gli eredi del Corbelletti. 1644.
- Considerazioni sopra l'arte dello stile e del dialogo. Rome: per gli eredi del Corbelletti. 1646.
- Vindicationes Societatis Iesu quibus multorum accusationes in eius institutum, leges, gymnasia, mores refelluntur (in Latin). Rome: typis Dominici Manelphi. 1649.
- Assertiones theologicæ. Rome. 1649–1652;
- RP Sfortiæ Pallavicini... Disputationum in Iam IIæ d. Thomae Tomus I (in Latin). Lyon: Sumpt. Philip. Borde, Laur. Arnaud & Cl. Rigaud. 1653.
- Arte della perfezione cristiana, divisa in tre libri. Rome: ad instanza di Iacomo Antonio Celsi, libraro appresso al Collegio Romano. 1665.
- Vera concilii Tridentini historia, contra falsam Petri Suavis Polani narrationem. Vol. 1. Translated by Giovanni Battista Giattini. Antwerp: ex officina Plantiniana Balthasaris Moreti. 1670.
- Vera concilii Tridentini historia, contra falsam Petri Suavis Polani narrationem. Vol. 2. Translated by Giovanni Battista Giattini. Antwerp: ex officina Plantiniana Balthasaris Moreti. 1670.
- Vera concilii Tridentini historia, contra falsam Petri Suavis Polani narrationem. Vol. 3. Translated by Giovanni Battista Giattini. Antwerp: ex officina Plantiniana Balthasaris Moreti. 1670.
- Della vita di Alessandro VII. 2 vols. Prato: Giachetti. 1839–1840.

The following editions of his Complete Works are to be noted as the most important: Rome, 1834 (in 2 volumes); Rome, 1844–1848 (in 33 volumes); and a collection of other works in five volumes published at the same time by Ottavio Gigli.

=== Works in English translation ===
- Pallavicino, Sforza. Martyr Hermenegild. Edited and translated by Stefano Muneroni. Renaissance and Reformation Texts in Translation 13. Toronto: Centre for Reformation and Renaissance Studies, 2019.

Catholic Church titles
Preceded by Pietro Vito Ottoboni	Cardinal-Priest of San Salvatore in Lauro; 1657–1667	Succeeded by Giovanni Delfino
