= Thomas Yale (chancellor) =

English civil lawyer

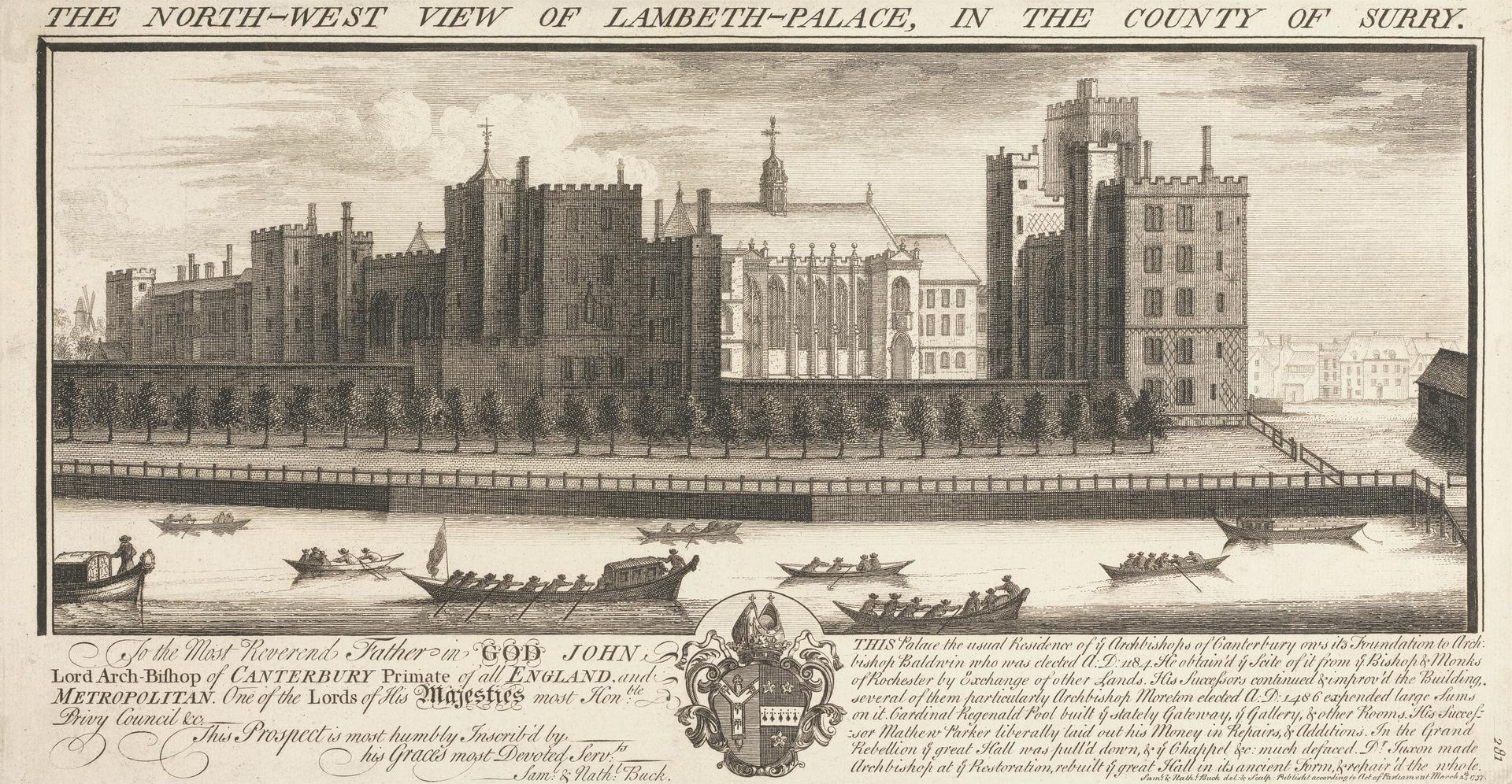
Lambeth Palace view from South Bank of the river Thames, next to Westminster Palace

Thomas Yale (1525/6 – 1577) was the Chancellor and Vicar general of the Head of the Church of England : Matthew Parker, 1st Lord Archbishop of Canterbury, and Edmund Grindal, Bishop of London. He was also Ambassador to his distant cousin, Queen Elizabeth Tudor, and Dean of the Arches at the Court of High Commission, during the Elizabethan Religious Settlement.

As Dean of the Arches, he was the most senior judge of the Church of England from 1567 to 1573. After Archbishop Grindal's suspension in 1577, the Queen gave him command of the Province of Canterbury, governing two-thirds of the ecclesiastical territories of England, and the entirety of Wales, during the Elizabethan Age.

== Early life ==
Thomas Yale was born in 1525 or 1526 to David Lloyd ap Ellis of Plas-yn-Yale, a member of the House of Yale. His grandfather, Ellis ap Griffith, founder of the House of Yale, was the Baron of Gwyddelwern, and a member of the Royal House of Mathrafal. This Ellis was a cousin of the Tudors, and a grandson of Lord Tudor Glendower, brother of Owen Glendower, last native Prince of Wales, and character in Shakespeare's play Henry IV, Part 1. Tudor Glendower was first cousin of Sir Owen Tudor, and Ellis was third cousin of Henry VII, Henry VIII, and Elizabeth I, as seen in their genealogies.

Thomas Yale's great-uncle, Gruffydd Vaughan, was the Governor and proprietor of Cilgerran Castle in Wales, and a relative of William Herbert, 1st Earl of Pembroke of Raglan Castle. Gruffydd was granted the castle for having hidden his cousin Jasper Tudor during the War of the Roses, before Henry Tudor's ascension as the first Tudor monarch at Bosworth. Jasper was Thomas Yale's third cousin, along with his brother, Edmund Tudor, 1st Earl of Richmond, father of the first Tudor monarch, and half-brothers of King Henry VI of the House of Lancaster.

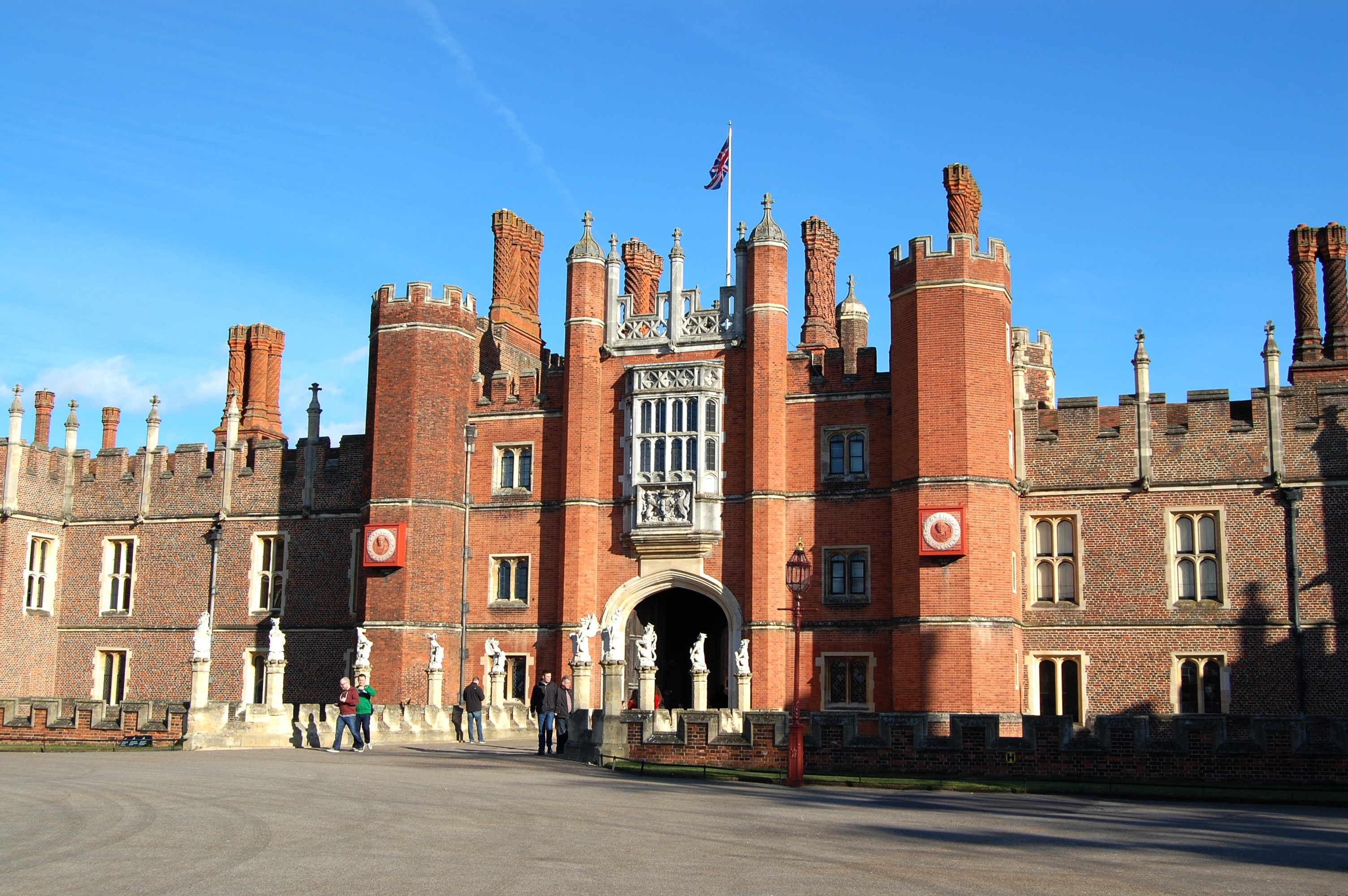
Hampton Court Palace, where Thomas's brother, Roger Lloyd Yale, was Secretary to Cardinal Wolsey, and member of his household

Thomas had two brothers, one named Roger, the other named John. Roger Lloyd Yale of Brynglas was Secretary to Cardinal Wolsey, along with Thomas Cromwell, and was married to Katherine, a daughter of William ap Griffith Vychan, Baron of Edeirnion and Lord of Kymmer-yn-Edeirnion. Wolsey was Henry VIII's chief minister and Lord Chancellor during the English Reformation, as well as the owner of Hampton Court Palace.

His other brother, John Wynn (Yale), the ancestor of the House of Yale (Yale family) of America and Wales, was the father of Dr. David Yale of Erddig Park, Chancellor of Chester, who married Frances Lloyd, daughter of Admiralty Judge John Lloyd, who cofounded with Queen Elizabeth the first Protestant college at Oxford. His wife Elizabeth was a granddaughter of Sir William Griffith of Penrhyn Castle, the Chamberlain of North Wales and relative of Margaret Beaufort.

David Yale became the great-grandfather of Governor Elihu Yale who gave his name to Yale University. His son, Thomas Yale Sr., was the father of the Yales who emigrated to America with the Eaton family, and was a cousin by marriage of Francis Willughby and Duchess Cassandra Willoughby of Wollaton Hall. Cassandra was related to Jane Austen, author of Pride and Prejudice.

David Yale was also the uncle of Countess Elizabeth Weston, daughter of Knight Simon Weston, whose family was well connected with the Earls of Essex, having participated in their Rebellion and Expedition against the Tudors and Habsburgs. The Yales were members of the House of Yale and bore coats of arms. Their House is, on the maternal side, a cadet branch of the Royal House of Mathrafal, through the Princes of Powys Fadog, and a cadet branch on the paternal side of the Fitzgerald Dynasty, through the Merioneth House of Corsygedol. The Lord of Yale title historically belonged to this family.

== Career ==
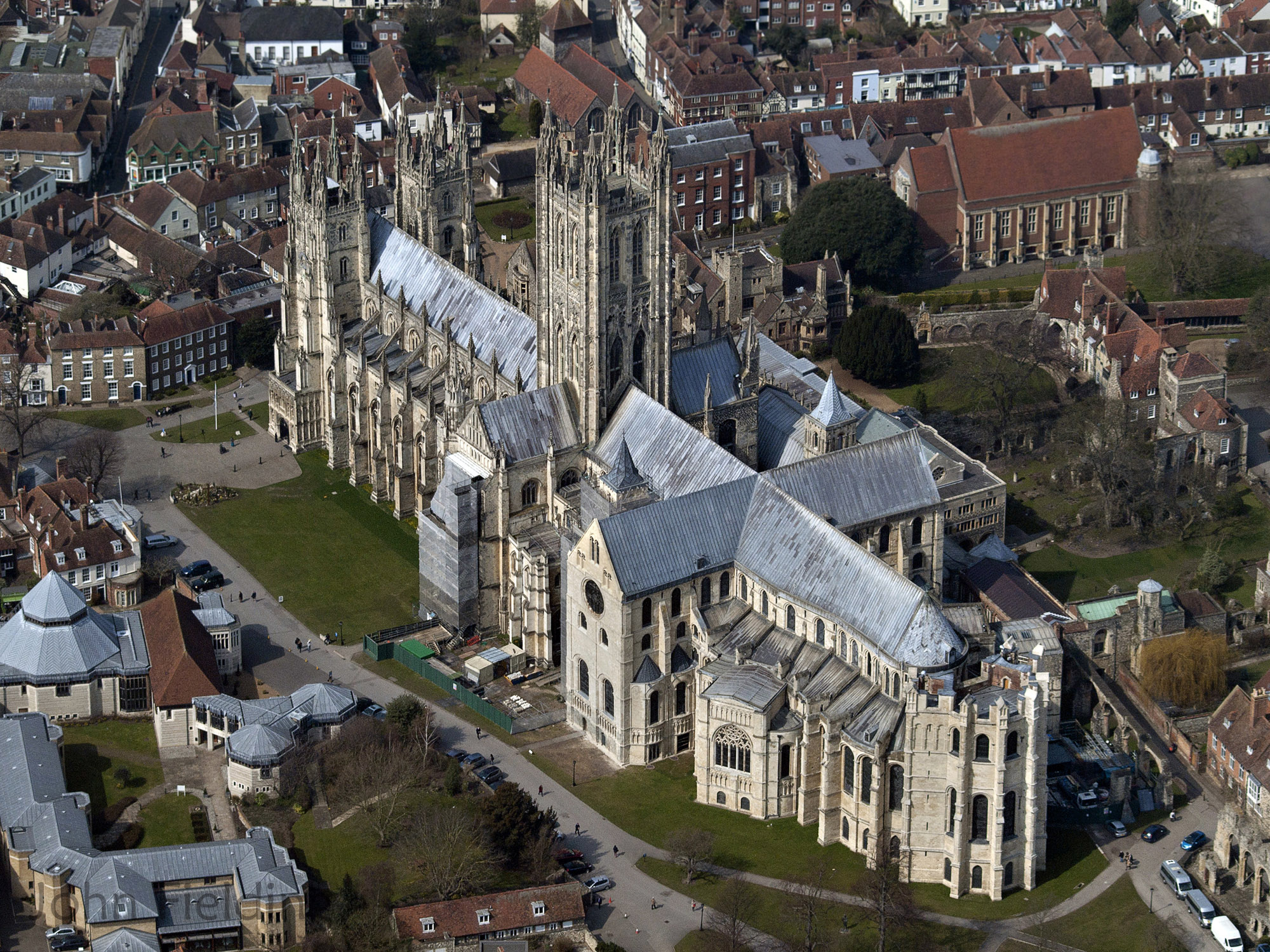
Canterbury Cathedral, the cathedral of the Lord Archbishop of Canterbury, head of the Church of England

Thomas Yale graduated B.A. at Cambridge University in 1542–3, and was elected a Fellow, member of the governing body of Queens' College of the University of Cambridge about 1544. He commenced M.A. in 1546, and filled the office of Bursar to his college from 1549 to 1551. He was one of the Proctors of the university for the year commencing Michaelmas 1552, but resigned before the expiration of his term of office. In 1554 he was appointed Commissary of the Diocese of Ely under Chancellor John Fuller, and in 1555 he was Keeper of the Spiritualities of the Diocese of Bangor during the vacancy after the death of Arthur Bulkeley, Bishop of Bangor. In that year he subscribed the Roman Catholic articles imposed upon all graduates of the university.

During the reign of Mary Tudor, in November 1556, his name occurs in the commission for the suppression of heresy within the Diocese of Ely, and he assisted in the search for heretical books during the visitation of the university by Cardinal Pole's delegates. In January 1556–7 he was among those empowered by the Senate to reform the composition for the election of Proctors and to revise the university statutes. He was created Doctor of Laws in 1557, and admitted an advocate of the Court of Arches on April 26, 1559. In the same year, he and four other leading civilians, subscribed an opinion that the commission issued by Queen Elizabeth Tudor, for the consecration of Lord Archbishop Matthew Parker, as her first head of the Anglican Church, was legally valid. The civilians were Lord Chancellor Robert Weston, Vice-Chancellor Henry Harvey, Bishop Nicholas Bullingham, and Master Edward Leeds.

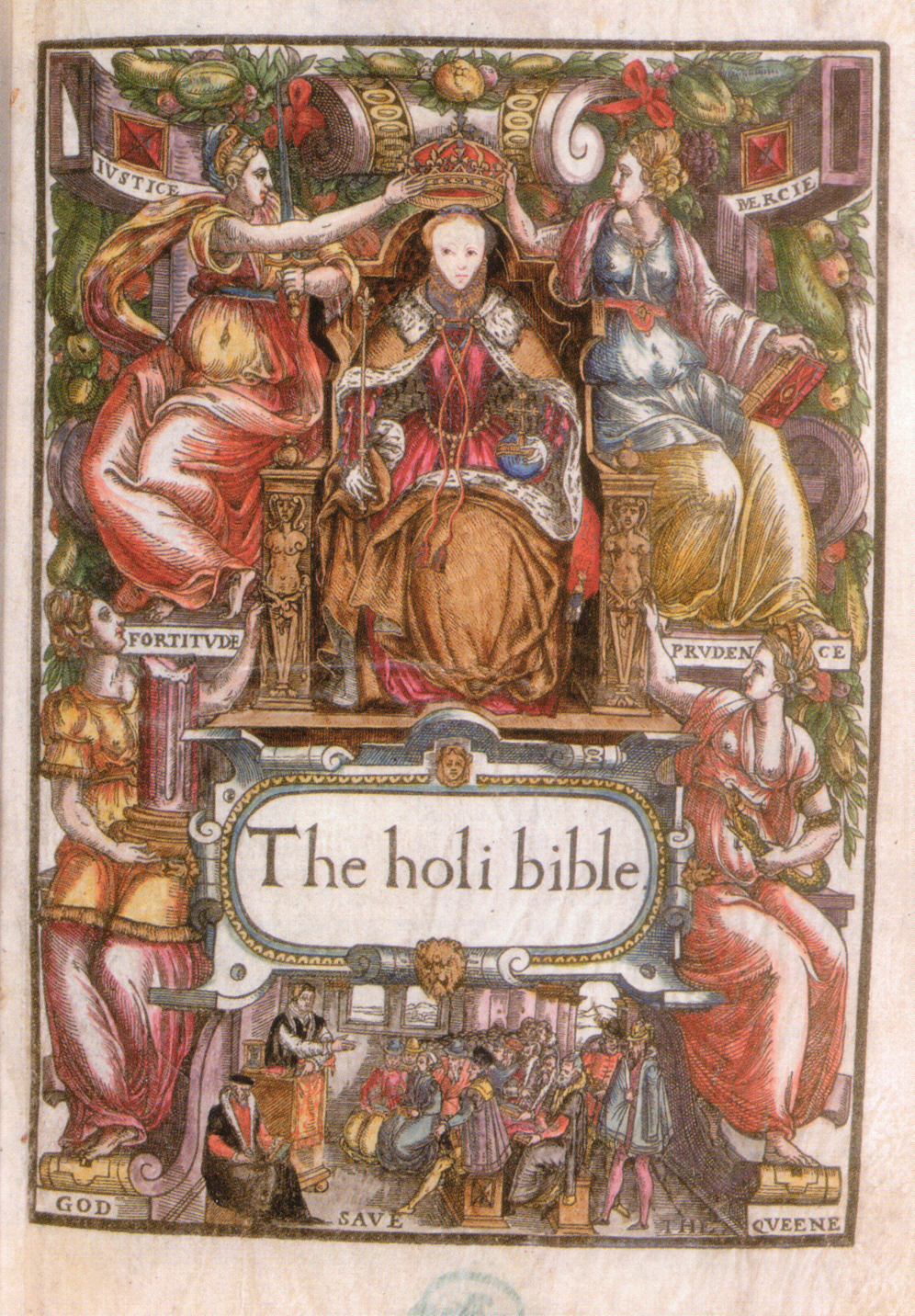
Chancellor Yale's is at the bottom left, next to Archbishop Parker, from a portrait of the Bishops' Bible, 1568, for Queen Elizabeth Tudor

For the Archbishop's consecration, it was Yale who read the Queen's mandate and Oath of Supremacy, and then after prayer, the singing of the Litany, and some questions, and further prayers, with the four Bishops laying their hands upon Parker. His consecrators were the Bishops Miles Coverdale, William Barlow, John Scory, and John Hodgkins. Parker, a great friend of Lord William Cecil and Sir Nicholas Bacon, was previously the chaplain of Elizabeth during her childhood and her mother, Queen Anne Boleyn. When Anne was arrested, he promised her that he would take care of the spiritual well-being of her daughter, as she was going to be executed for treason. He later became the chaplain of Elizabeth's father, King Henry VIII, and a close associate of Edward Seymour, 1st Duke of Somerset and John Dudley, 1st Duke of Northumberland. Archbishop Parker would become the chief architect of Anglican thought, bringing the Church of England into a national institution.

A few years later, Parker would also be of help to the Queen and Lord Cecil regarding the legitimacy of the Earldom of Edward de Vere, 17th Earl of Oxford, as his father John had a bigamous marriage with a mistress. As the young Edward was a ward of the Queen, none had interest of accepting the petition of Lord Windsor and Katherine de Vere, his half-sister. Archbishop Parker settled the marriage matters, and Lord Cecil took credit in a letter.

Thomas Yale's nephew, Dr. David Yale, Chancellor of Chester, and Fellow of Queens' College, Cambridge also later wrote a letter to Lord Cecil concerning the nominations of Humphrey Tyndall and Dr. Chaderton (the current President of Queens'), begging to keep the influence of Robert Dudley, 1st Earl of Leicester over the Fellows of the university. Despite this, Lord Cecil used his influence to have Tyndall elected President of Queens' College and Dr. Chaderton as Bishop of Chester, reducing the Queen's favourite influence.

On March 25, 1560, Thomas Yale was admitted to the Prebend of Offley in Lichfield Cathedral. In the same year he became Rector of Leverington in the Isle of Ely. He, Alexander Nowell, Richard Turner, and other Archiepiscopal commissioners, were sent to visit the churches and Dioceses of Canterbury, Rochester, and Peterborough, meeting with Dean Nicholas Wotton, a Royal envoy of Charles V, Holy Roman Emperor. On April 24, 1561, the Archbishop commissioned him and Vice-Chancellor, Walter Wright to visit the church, city, and Diocese of Oxford.

== Judge ==
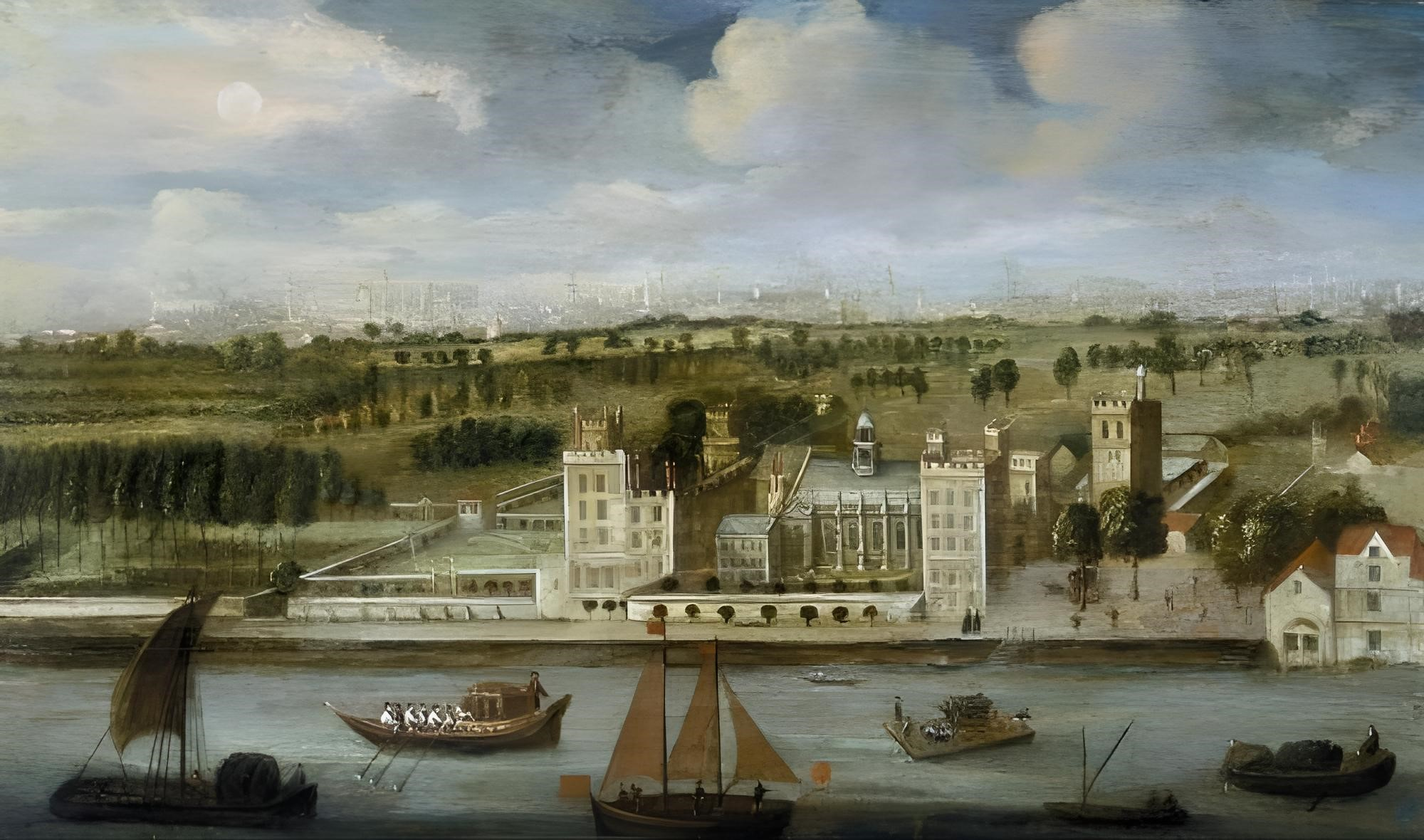
Painting of Lambeth Palace, London residence of the Archbishop of Canterbury and his household, Yale was a member of its court, is now at the Museum of London

Yale was part of the Cambridge Reformers who were responsible for Elizabeth Tudor’s education, and aided her in her subsequent rise to power. As a reward for validating the election of Matthew Parker as new head of the Anglican Church, she gave him positions. On June 28, 1561, he was constituted for life Judge of the Court of Audience, Official Principal, Chancellor, and Vicar general to the 1st Lord Archbishop of Canterbury, and in the same year obtained the Rectory of Llantrisant, Anglesey.

As a member of the household of Archbishop Matthew Parker, he now lived at Lambeth Palace in London, next to the Palace of Westminster. The maintenance of ecclesiastical discipline was one of the largest tasks of Elizabeth's administration. Visitations of Dioceses and courts were necessary to prevent or punish breaches of the laws of the church, and was a matter of considerable discussion and controversy in Tudor England. In 1562 he became Chancellor of the Diocese of Bangor in Wales, and in May, was commissioned by Matthew Parker to visit All Souls and Merton College at Oxford. In 1563 he was on a commission to visit the Diocese of Ely with John Pory and Edward Leeds.

On July 7, 1564, Yale was instituted to the Prebend of Vaynoll in the Diocese of St Asaph. In 1566 he was one of the Masters in Ordinary of the Court of Chancery, and was placed on a commission to visit the Diocese of Bangor with Robert Weston, David Lewis, and Sir Ambrose Cave, Chancellor of the Duchy of Lancaster. In 1567 he was appointed Dean of the Arches, becoming the most senior ecclesiastical judge in England, presiding over the Arches Court, a post which he resigned in 1573. Yale's predecessor, Robert Weston, future Lord Chancellor of Ireland, was the granduncle of Countess Elizabeth Weston, who later became the niece of Chancellor David Yale of Chester, Yale's nephew.

When Queen Elizabeth made Richard Rogers the new Bishop Suffragan of Dover in 1569, Matthew Parker consecrated Yale with episcopal insignia at Lambeth Palace, with the assistance of the Bishop of London, Edmund Grindal. Yale and William Drury, England's two leading ecclesiastical lawyers, William King, one of the Queen's chaplains, and Gabriel Goodman, Dean of St Paul's Cathedral and Lord Cecil's chaplain, were present at the event. Drury was later sent as an Ambassador on behalf of Queen Elizabeth to meet the Regent of Scotland, James Douglas, 4th Earl of Morton, representing Mary, Queen of Scots for talks.

In 1570, Yale seems to have established an exclusive claim to the right to dispense and license in marriage matters, a function he delegated in 1573 to his commissary general. He was also one of the Commissioners, along with Attorney-General Gilbert Gerard and William Drury, for the visitation of the church and Diocese of Norwich. By a patent confirmed on July 15, 1571, he was constituted Joint-Keeper of the Prerogative court, representing the Sovereign's discretionary powers, privileges, and legal immunities. When Master of that court, he is recorded proving the will of Sir Walter Cope's family, patron of Cuthbert Burbage, the builder of the Globe Theatre, where Shakespeare played his works at the time. Cope also organized Shakespeare's representation of Love's Labour's Lost with Lord Robert Cecil at Cecil House, in honor of the visit of Queen Anne of Denmark.

== Later life ==
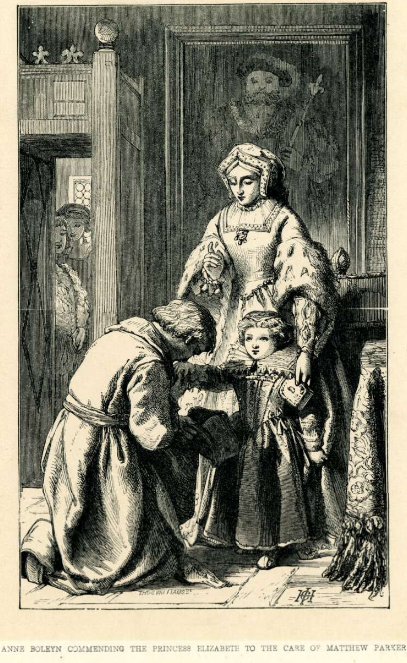
Yale's patron, Matthew Parker, commanded by Queen Anne Boleyn to the care of the young Elizabeth

Thomas Yale married in 1561 Joanna (died September 12, 1587), daughter of Nicholas Waleron. Joanna was previously married to Ambassador Simon Heynes, who was one of those who invalidated the marriage of Henry VIII with Anne of Cleves, and charged for treason Sir Thomas Wyatt. He was also involved with reformer Philip Melanchthon, a collaborator of Martin Luther. Joanna married secondly to the Lord Archbishop of York, William May, who was the President of Queens' College, Cambridge. Her brother-in-law was the Bishop of Carlisle, John May, who previously served the House of de Vere. Thomas Yale was also the father-in-law of Amye Marshall, the cousin of Sir Lawrence Washington, member of the Washington family. He was from the branch of Lawrence Washington of Sulgrave Manor, the great-great-grandfather of George Washington, 1st President of the United States.

On Parker's death in 1575, Yale acted as one of his executors. Yale was also godfather to Bishop Bullingham's children. Matthew Parker's successor, Edmund Grindal, 2nd Lord Archbishop of Canterbury, and new Head of the Anglican Church, also appointed him Chancellor, Vicar general, Official Principal and Judge of his audience. On 23 April 1576 he was placed on a commission for repressing religious malcontents. On 2 May he and Nicholas Robinson, Bishop of Bangor, were empowered by Grindal to visit on his behalf the Diocese of Bangor, and on 17 August he and Gilbert Berkeley, Bishop of Bath and Wells, were similarly commissioned to visit the church at Wells.

In the same year, Yale and Dr. William Aubrey represented to Grindal the need of reforms in the Court of Chancery. After disagreements with Elizabeth Tudor and Lord Cecil, the Queen suspended Archbishop Grindal in June 1577. Yale discharged his judicial duties for him and governed the whole Province of Canterbury, covering roughly two-thirds of England, continuing to rule until November when he fell ill. He built in 1575 the Yale Chapel at Bryneglwys, which overlies the Yale family burial vault, and died in either November or December, 1577.

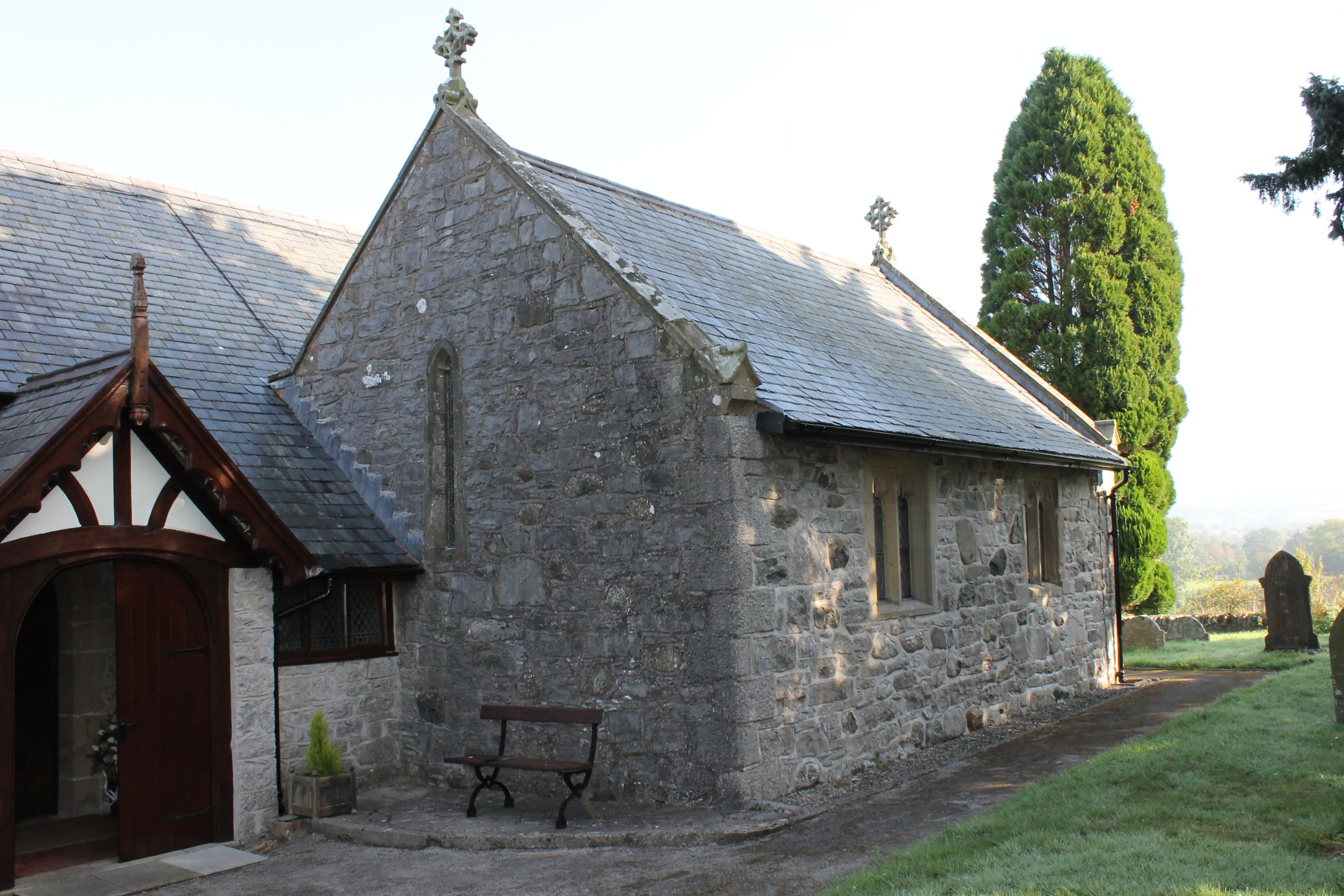
Bryneglwys, Saint Tysilio church, the "Yale Chapel" was built by Dr. Yale in 1575 during the Tudor period

His 170 acres residence in Ilford, East London with his wife Joan (Joanna) was Newberry or Newbury Manor, which initially belonged to Barking Abbey before Henry VIII's dissolution of the monasteries. The King granted the estate to Sir Richard Gresham, Lord Mayor of London, whose family founded the Royal Exchange and built Longleat House. It was later sold by Yale's family, and passed to Gov. Richard Benyon of Gidea Hall, and now belongs to his descendant, British Minister Richard Benyon of Englefield House.

For many years, Yale was an ecclesiastical High Commissioner to Elizabeth Tudor at the Court of High Commission, assuming the role of Ambassador. As one of the leaders of the Church of England, he was featured with the Queen, the Archbishop Matthew Parker, the Chief minister Lord Cecil of Burghley House, the Earl Leicester of Kenilworth Castle, and many others, in the correspondence letters of Matthew Parker as they were governing during the Elizabethan Religious Settlement. Yale was also a great collector of ancient records and registers, with volumes now belonging to the Cotton library collection. His collection included letters from Prince Llywelyn the Last to Archbishop Robert Kilwardby, under Pope Gregory X of the Visconti family, and Archbishop John Peckham, under Pope Nicholas III of the Orsini family.

Some manuscript extracts by him entitled ‘Collecta ex Registro Archiepiscoporum Cantuar.’ are preserved among the Cottonian manuscripts (Cleopatra F. i. 267), and were printed in John Strype's Life of Parker, iii. 177–82. A statement of his case in a controversy for precedency with Bartholomew Clerke is among the Petyt manuscripts in the library of the Inner Temple. An elegy on Yale by Peter Leigh is preserved in the British Museum in London. (Addit. MS. 26737, f. 43). Yale is also featured in Lord Cecil's papers at Hatfield House, regarding pleadings on the Hatfield Regis Priory in Essex. His nephew was Chancellor David Yale, his great-grandnephew was Capt. Thomas Yale, and his great-great-grandnephew was Gov. Elihu Yale, benefactor of Yale University in America.

== Gallery ==
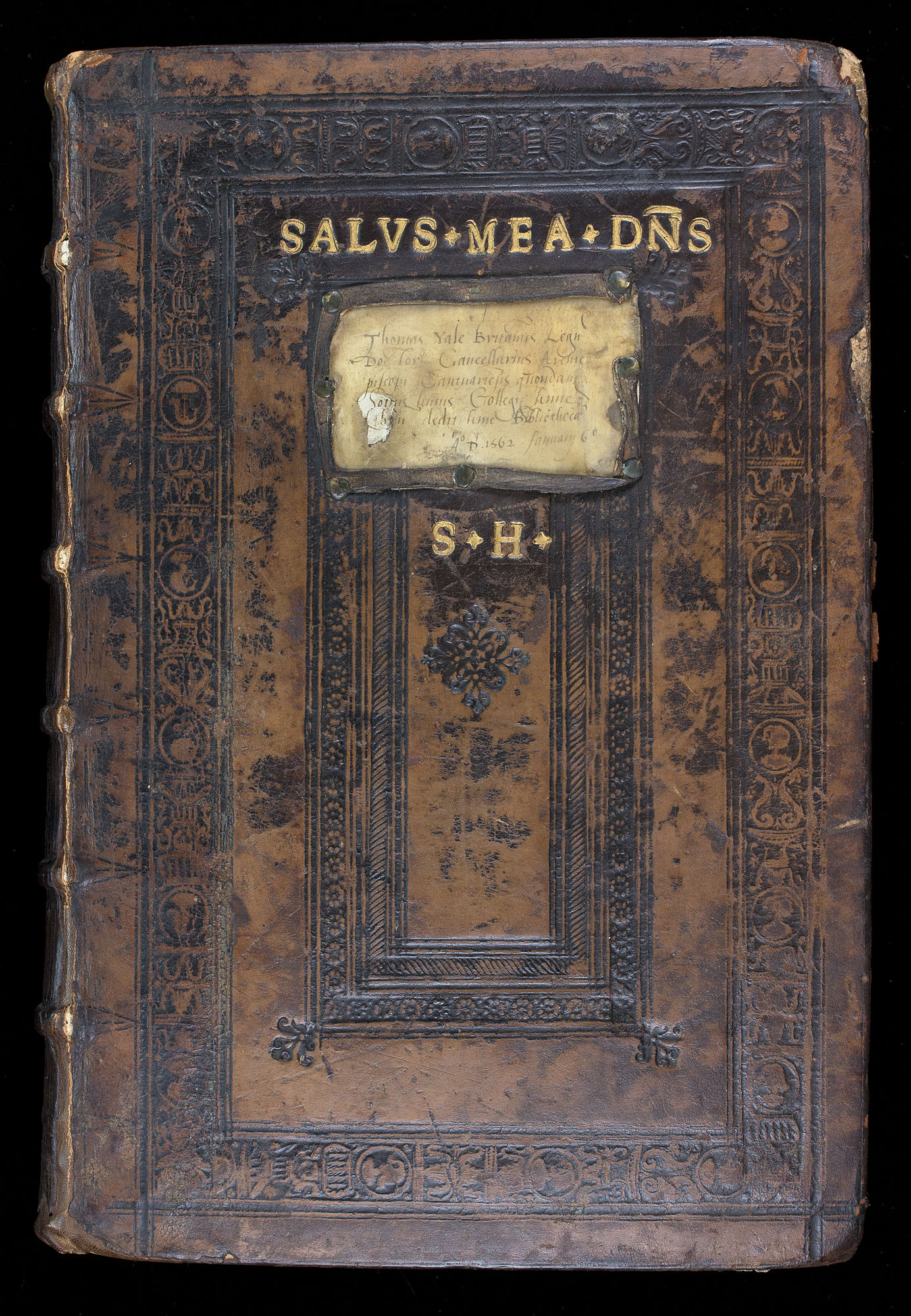

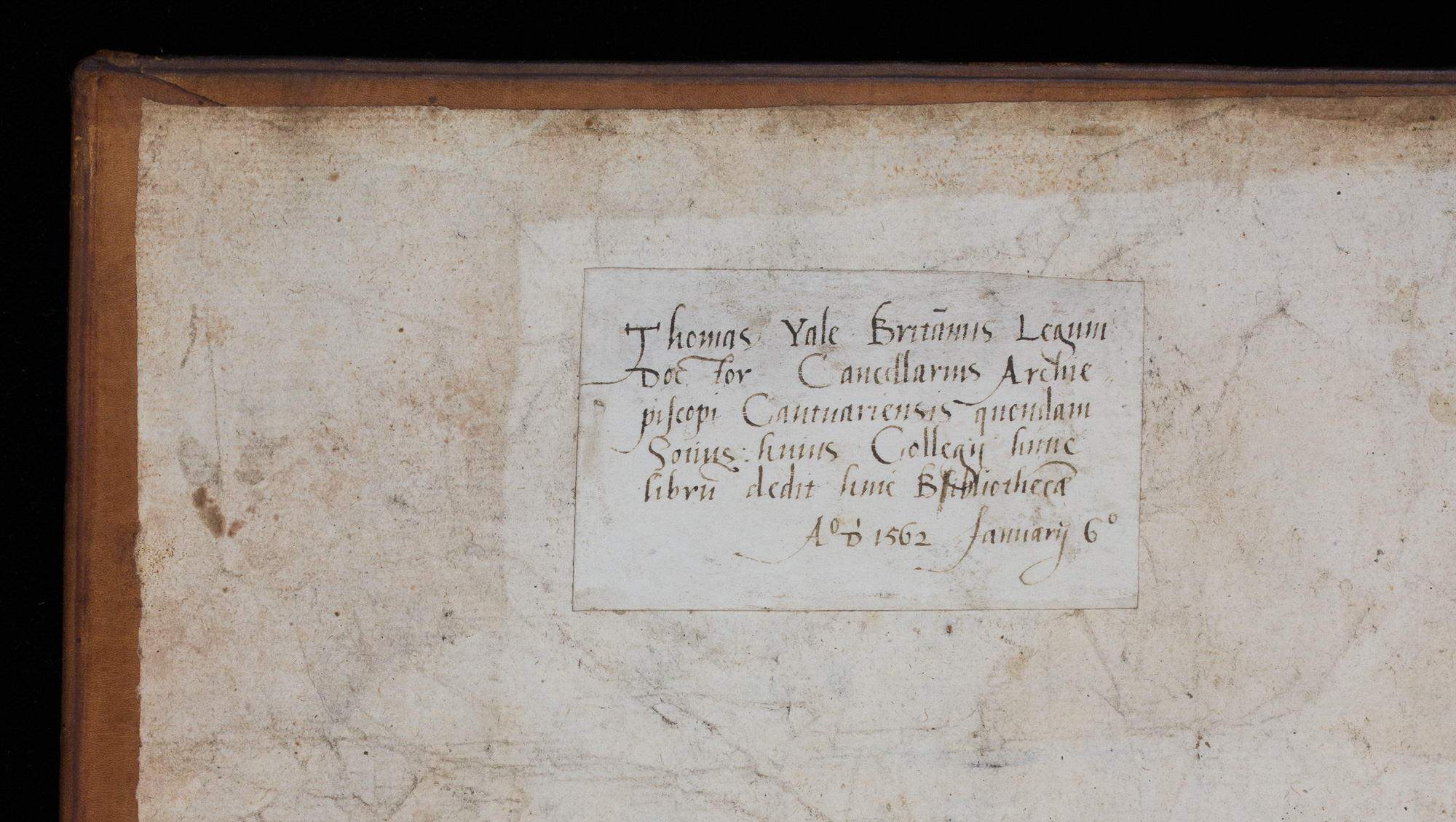

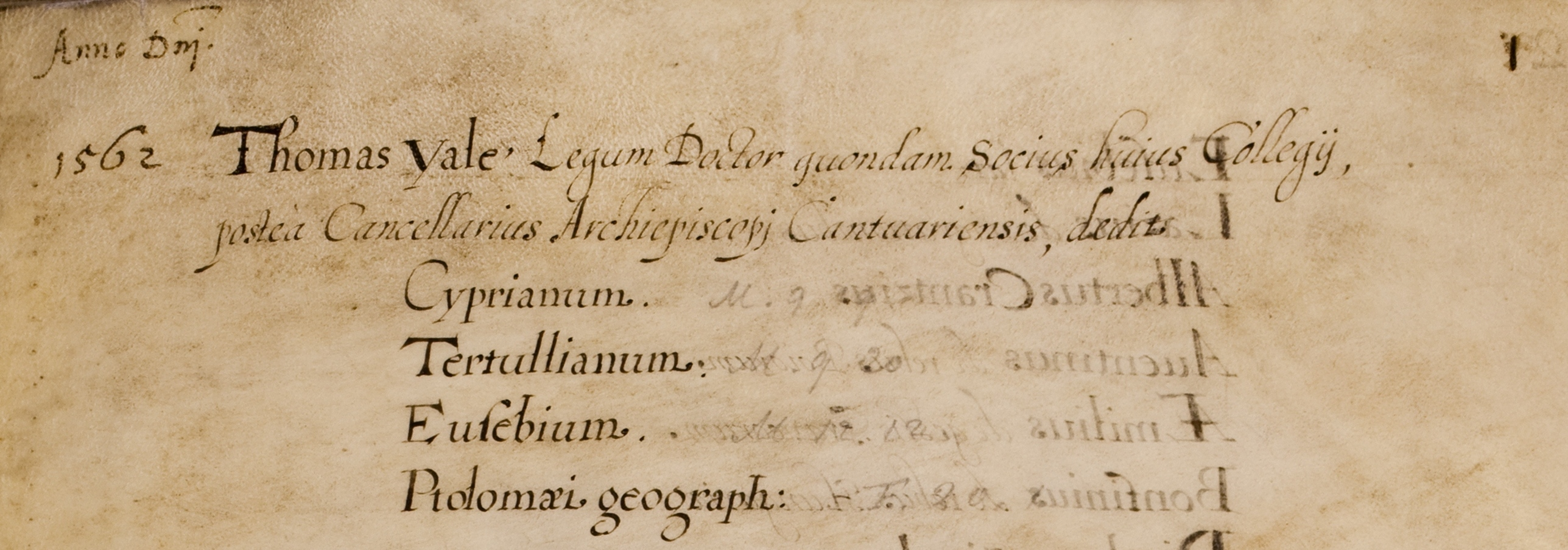

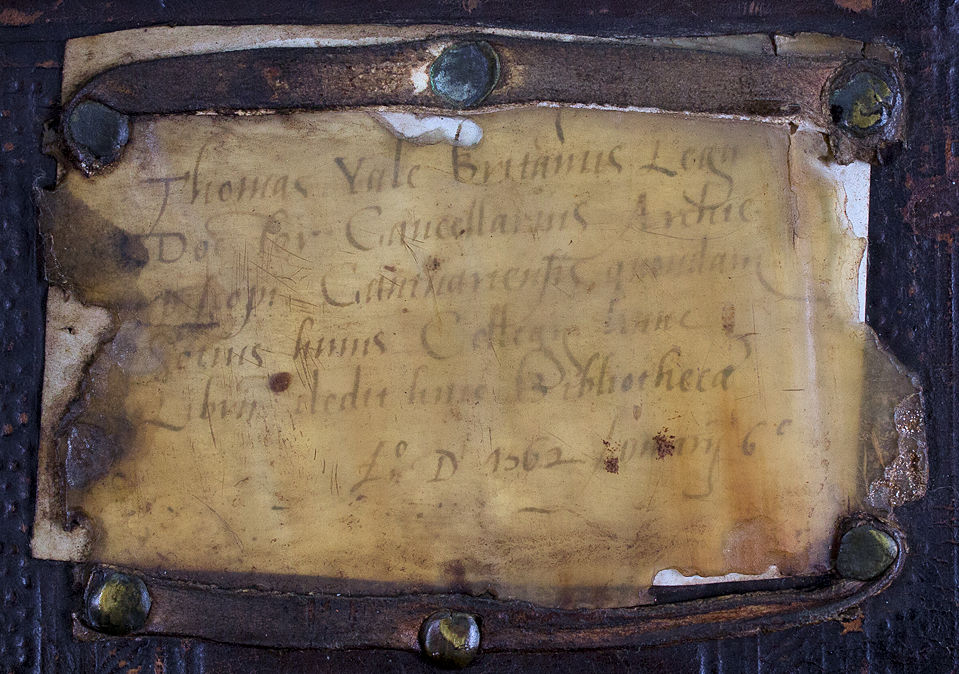

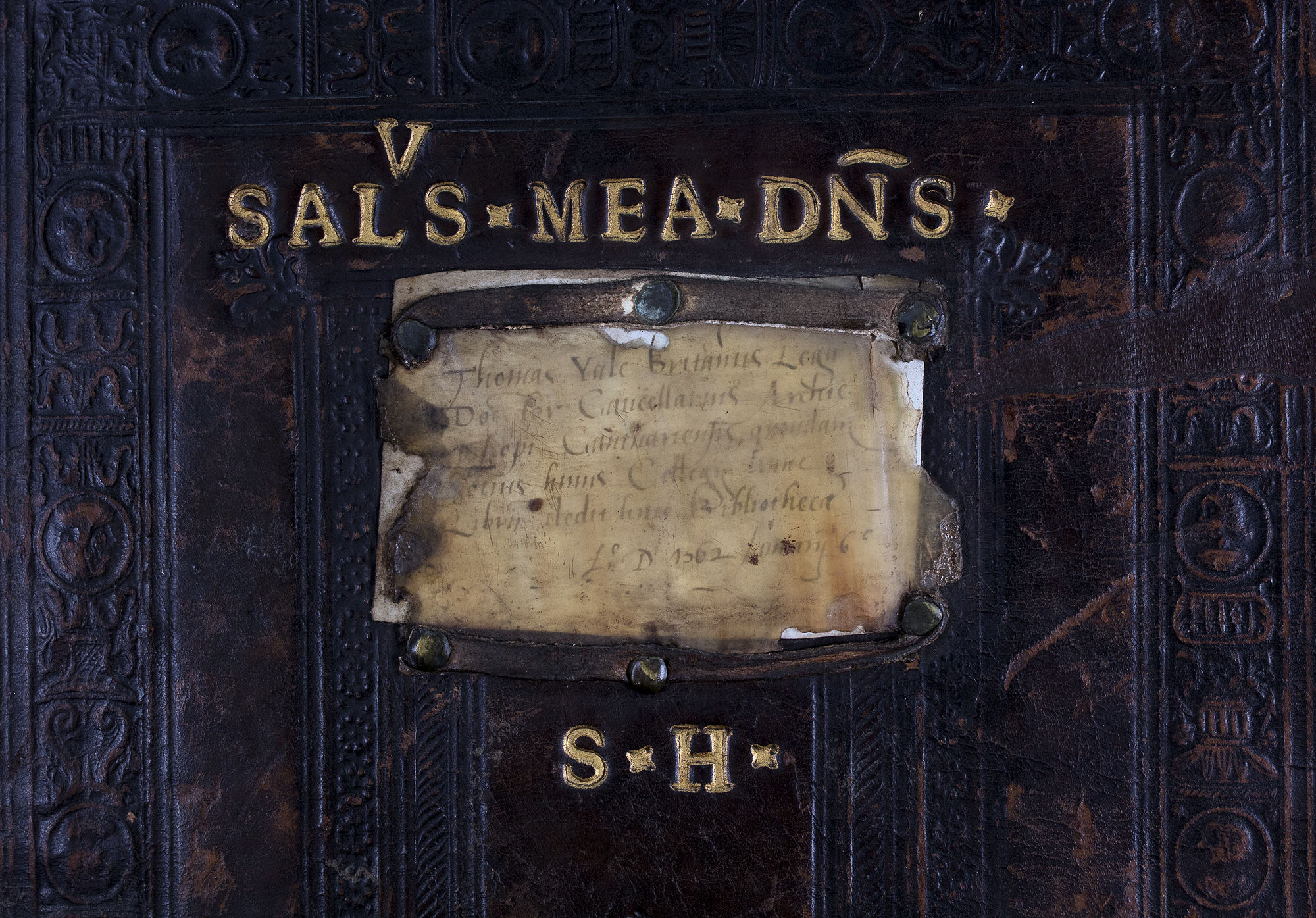
