= Paolo Segneri =

Italian Jesuit preacher (1624–1694)

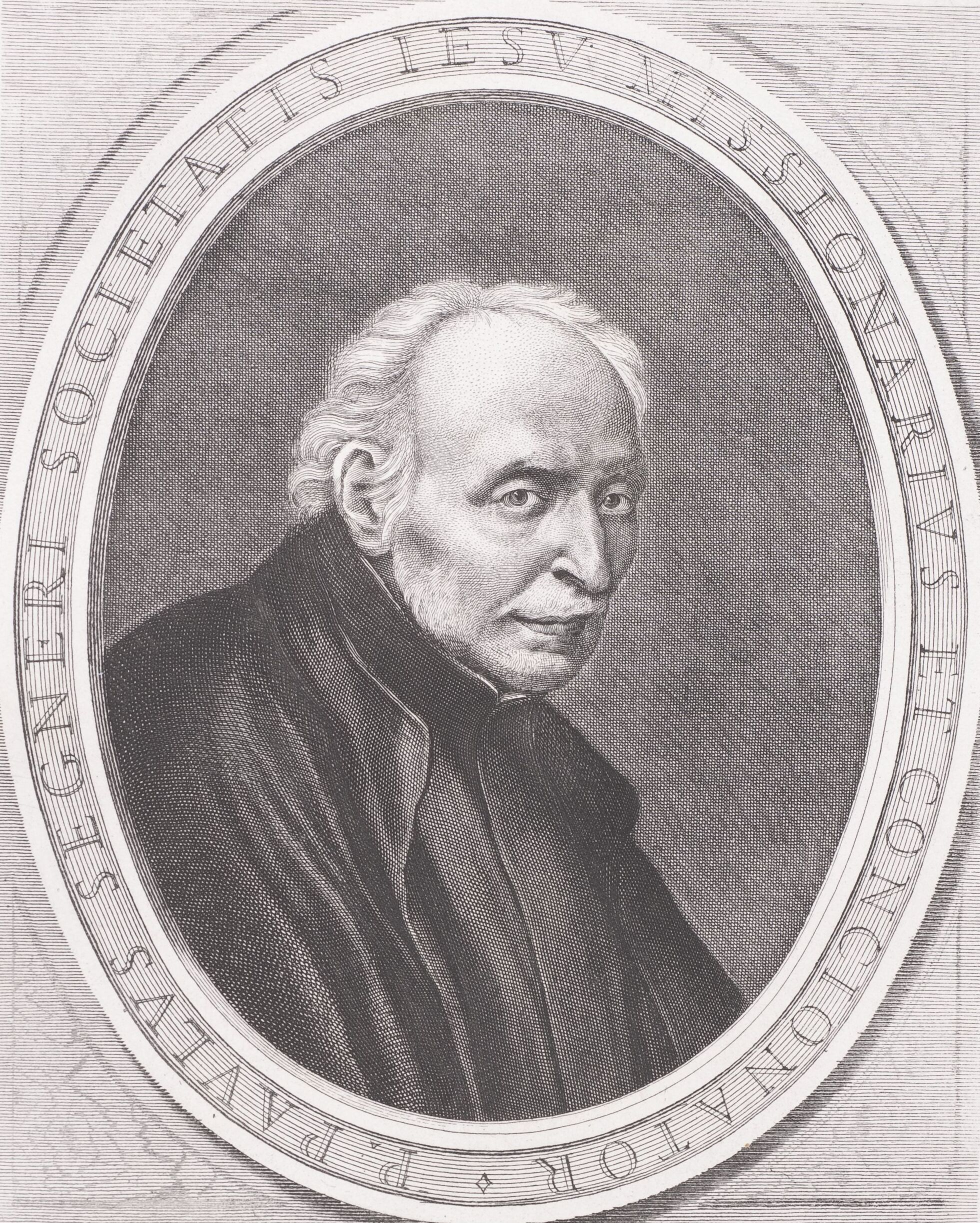

Orders
- Ordination: 1653

Personal details
- Born: March 21, 1624 Nettuno, Papal States
- Died: 9 December 1694 (aged 70) Rome, Papal States
- Education: Roman College

Paolo Segneri (21 March 1624 – 9 December 1694) was an Italian Jesuit preacher, missionary, and ascetical writer.

== Life ==
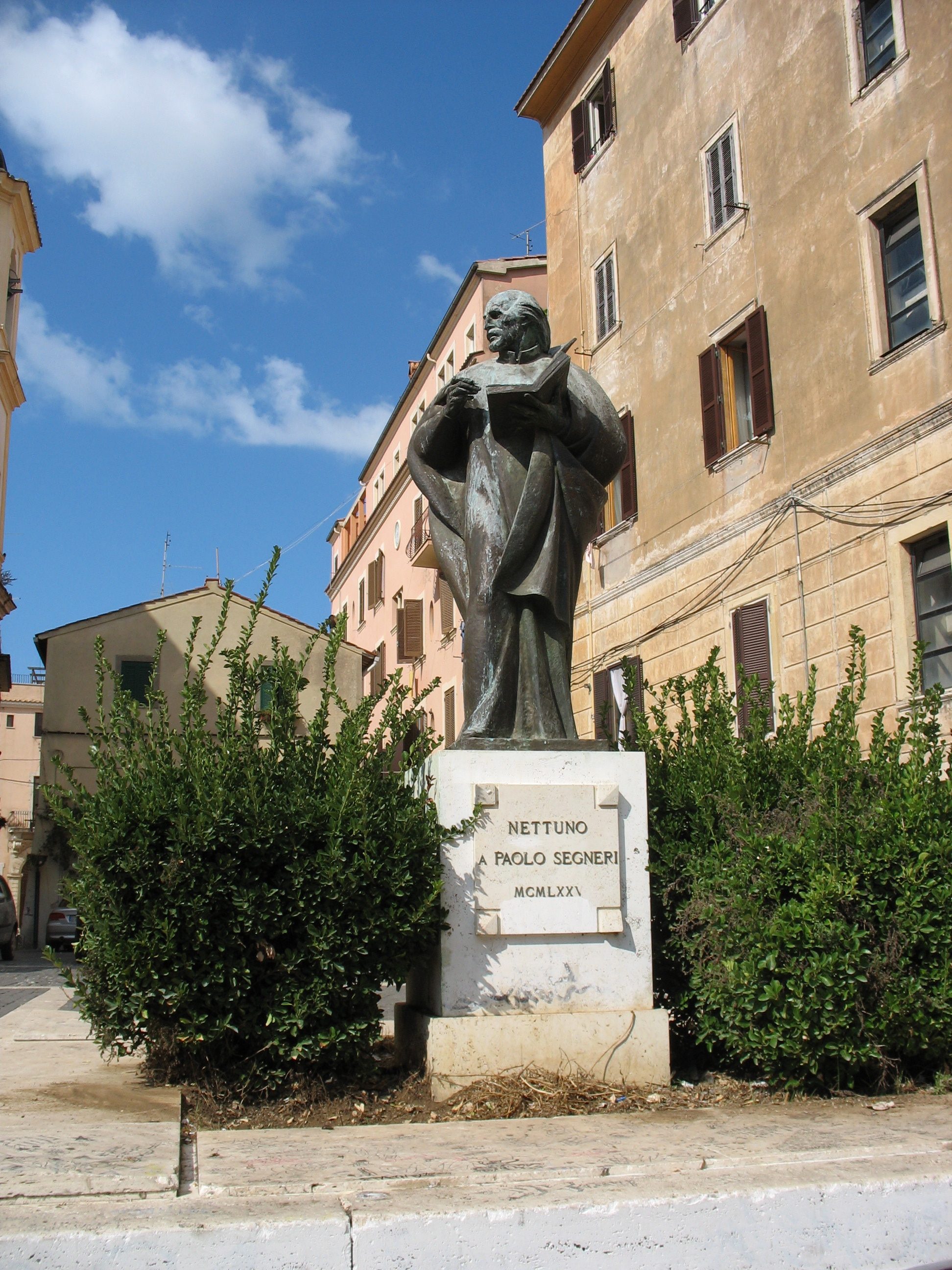
Statue of Paolo Segneri, on the 'Piazza San Giovanni' Nettuno.

Segneri was born at Nettuno. He studied at the Roman College, and in 1637 entered the Society of Jesus, not without opposition from his father. Oliva was his first master in the religious life; Sforza Pallavicino taught him theology. Under such guides, his virtues and talents developed to maturity.

He lectured on humanities for several years, and was ordained priest in 1653. By a careful study of Scripture, the Fathers, and the Orations of Cicero, he had prepared himself for the pulpit. He volunteered for the foreign missions, but Tuscany, the Papal States, and the chief cities of Italy were to be the scene of his labours. He preached at first in the great cathedrals, and then for twenty-seven years (1665–92) gave popular missions with an eloquence surpassed only by his holiness. His "Quaresimale" (Florence, 1679, tr. New York, 1874) was read and admired by Antonio Pignatelli, who as Pope Innocent XII summoned the missionary to preach before him, and made him theologian of the Paenitentiaria. Segneri's biographer, Massei, states that "Le Prediche dette nei palazzo apostolico" (Rome, 1694) won the admiration of the pontiff and his Court. He died in Rome.

After St. Bernadine of Siena and Savonarola, Segneri was Italy's greatest orator. He reformed the Italian pulpit. Segneri at times stumbles into the defects of the "Seicentisti" (Marinisti). The "Quaresimale", "the Prediche", the "Panegyrici Sacri" (Florence, 1684, translated by Father Humphrey, London, 1877), stamp him as a great orator.

Entire districts flocked to hear him; extraordinary graces and favours marked his career. His triumphs left him simple as a child.

== Works ==
In his theological discussion with his superior-general, Thyrsus Gonzalez, who was a firm champion of Probabiliorism, he combined the respect and obedience of the subject with the independence of the trained thinker (cf. Lettere sulla Materia del Probabile" in vol. IV of "Opere", Venice, 1748).

Segneri wrote also "Il penitente istruito (Bologna, 1669); "Il confessore istruito" (Brescia, 1672); "La Manna dell anima" (Milan, 1683, tr. London, New York, 1892); "Il Cristiano istruito" (Florence, 1690). His complete works (cf. Somervogel) have been frequently edited: at Parma, 1701; Venice, 1712–58; Turin, 1855, etc. The "Quaresimale" has been printed at least thirty times. Some of Segneri's works have been translated into Arabic. Hallam criticizes Segneri; Ford is more just in his appreciation.

His book "La concordia tra la fatica e la quiete" speaks about meditation, its techniques and its aims, and is one of the best works on this subject.
