= Bandino Gualfreducci =

16th-century Italian Jesuit, humanist and poet

- Born: 1565; Pistoia, Republic of Florence
- Died: 5 March 1627 (aged 61–62); Rome, Papal States
- Occupations: Jesuit, humanist and poet

Bandino Gualfreducci (1565 – 5 March 1627) was an Italian Jesuit, humanist and poet.

== Biographie ==
Bandino Gualfreducci was born at Pistoia, joined the Jesuits, and taught rhetoric for six years at the Roman College. Later he became Latin Secretary to the General of the Order, and finally, near the end of his life, retired to the Jesuits' house in Rome, where he died.

== Works ==
Bandino Gualfreducci wrote a considerable amount of Latin verse, principally dramas. He was author of several Latin poems of religious content and of some theatrical pieces that were performed at the Roman College. His miscellaneous verse was collected in the following volume: Variorum Carminum libri sex. Sophoclis Oedipus Tyrannus eodem interprete. Rome (apud heredem Barth. Zannetti), 1622. Gualfreducci took an unusual interest in the Greek Anthology; and it may well be that it was owing to his interest that it came to play a part in Jesuit education. The sixth book of his Carmina is wholly made up of translations from the Greek epigrams arranged roughly in the order of the Planudean collection. The section is headed: 'E Graeco libro Anthologiae.'

These translations in many instances are the same as those published in the Selecta Epigrammata of 1608 under the initials 'B. Gu.,' and it seems probable that Gualfreducci was the editor of that Selection.

Gualfreducci's collection includes also a Latin version of Sophocles' Oedipus Rex.

== List of works ==
- Hieromenia seu sacri menses, Rome, 1622, 1625, in-12: a collection of Latin poems in praise of every saint celebrated by the Church every day of the year.
- Variorum carminum libri sex, ibid., 1622, in-12 (online).
- Sigeris, Tragœdia, ibid., 1627, in-12.
- Oratio de Passione Domini, ibid., 1641, in-12.

== Bibliography ==
- Carlos Sommervogel: Bibliothèque de la Compagnie de Jésus, vol. 3, p. 1898 (online).
- Hutton, James (1935). The Greek Anthology in Italy to the Year 1800. Ithaca: Cornell University Press. pp. 258–9.
- Michaud, Joseph-François; Michaud, Louis-Gabriel (1857). "Gualfreducci (Bandino)". Biographie universelle, ancienne et moderne (in French). Vol. 18. Paris: chez Madame C. Desplaces. p. 11.
- Filippi, Bruna (2001). Il teatro degli argomenti: gli scenari seicenteschi del teatro gesuitico romano: catalogo analitico. Institutum historicum Societatis Iesu. pp. 83, 121, 301.
