= Richard Mocket =

English churchman and academic

Richard Mocket (also Moket or Moquet) (1577–1618) was an English churchman and academic, warden of All Souls' College, Oxford, from 1614.

== Life ==
He was born at Dorchester in Dorset. He graduated B.A. from Brasenose College, Oxford, on 16 February 1595, and was elected Fellow of All Souls in 1599, proceeding M.A. on 5 April 1600, B.D. on 23 April 1607, and D.D. 26 June 1609. George Abbot, then bishop of London, presented him to the rectory of St Clement Eastcheap, on 29 December 1610, and to that of St Michael Crooked Lane, on 1 October 1611. He resigned St Clement before 9 December 1611, and St Michael before 17 June 1614.

Mocket held the rectories of Newington, Oxfordshire, and of West Tarring, Sussex, from 1614, and of Monks Risborough, Buckinghamshire, from 1615 till his death. He was for some time domestic chaplain to Abbot, and one of the king's commissioners concerning ecclesiastical affairs. From March 1610 to June 1614 he was employed in licensing books for entry at Stationers' Hall. On 12 April 1614 he was elected Warden of All Souls' College, Oxford.

Mocket died on 6 July 1618, and was buried in the chapel of All Souls'. A marble tablet with a Latin inscription was fixed to the south wall of the inner chapel (moved to the north wall of the outer chapel in 1664).

== Works ==
Mocket is known for two works: for each of them there is some remaining mystery for scholars.

=== God and the King ===
The authorship of a tract, upholding the obligation of the oath of allegiance, and entitled God and the King (in Latin Deus et rex), has been ascribed to Mocket; Glenn Burgess comments in the Oxford Dictionary of National Biography on the lack of firm evidence that he was the author. It remained an authoritative theological summary into the next century.

The work was ‘Imprinted by his Majesties special privilege and command,’ in London in 1615, in both Latin and English; London, 1616, in Latin only; Edinburgh, 1617, in one or both languages; London, 1663; Edinburgh, 1725; London, 1727 (published by Nathaniel Booth). The book was commanded to be taught in all schools and universities, and by all ministers of the church, and to be purchased by all householders in England and Scotland. This command was enjoined by the privy council of Scotland in June 1616, and by the general assembly at Aberdeen in August 1616, and the work sold widely.

It is a dialogue on political duties, intended for the young. The content is a mixture of history (an account of Catholic intrigues against James and Elizabeth I), and religious generalities, to justify the requirement of an oath of allegiance. It implies an account of the divine right of kings, but in religious rather than legal terms. Theodidactus, who leads the dialogue, justifies the penal laws.

A parody appeared by John Floyd, Latin original (1619) Deus et rex, and in English (1620) as God and the King. Or a dialogue wherein is treated of allegiance due to our most gracious Lord, King Iames, within his dominions.

=== Doctrina et Politia ===
In 1616, in London, Mocket published a volume in Latin, containing some works not previously translated from English. It comprised:

1. John Jewel's ‘Apology,’
2. The Church Catechism,
3. Alexander Nowell's Catechism,
4. The Thirty-Nine Articles,
5. The Liturgy of the Church of England, and
6. The Book of Ordination of Bishops, Priests, and Deacons.

To these he added a work of his own entitled Doctrina et Politia Ecclesiæ Anglicanæ, which was a general view of ecclesiastical jurisdiction in the English church, mainly prepared for the information of foreigners. The book offended the king, and by public edict was condemned and burnt in 1617. Thomas Fuller in his Church History considered that Mocket suffered on account of his patron Abbot, becoming unpopular with other bishops. Peter Heylyn in his Cyprianus Anglicus, while criticising Mocket's ignorance and Calvinism, was of opinion that the real offence was the omission of the first clause in the Latin text of the twentieth of the Thirty-Nine Articles, which runs: ‘The Church hath power to decree rites or ceremonies, and authority in controversies of faith.’ It was also said that Mocket's extracts from the homilies were made so as to support the views of Abbot, and that as a translator he had acted as a commentator; while James Montagu, bishop of Winchester, resented the order in which the bishoprics were enumerated. The 1616 edition of the Doctrina et Politia Ecclesiæ Anglicanæ was reprinted in 1617.

Mocket's work, without the rest of the volume, was republished in London in 1683, under the title, ‘Tractatus de Politia Ecclesiæ Anglicanæ,’ and with it was printed Richard Zouch's ‘Descriptio Juris et Judicii Ecclesiastici.’ A third edition appeared in London in 1705.

Modern scholars do not accept the explanations of Fuller and Heylyn at face value. Screech considered that the reasons given do not add up to enough to explain burning rather than revision.

Clegg puts the incident in the context of the divisive church politics of the Netherlands—–the Calvinist-Arminian debate ahead of the Synod of Dort of 1618–9—and the tensions among bishops at court (agreeing in part with the direction of the comments in Fuller and Heylyn). On the assumption that Doctrina et Politia was directed at overseas Protestants, the rendering of Article 20 had the misfortune to contradict the King's policy for handling the Dutch Remonstrants, by weakening the case for a conciliar solution to the theological issues under dispute. Late in 1617 Sir Dudley Carleton reported to Thomas Lake the circulation of a Dutch book Weeg-schaal by Jacob Taurinus, contrasting King James's actions at the Hampton Court Conference to his advocacy of a council in the Netherlands. Clegg points out that the historical record of the burning is very slender; and argues that the likely reason is embarrassment to the king of this tactical kind.
