= Sylvester Maurus =

Italian theologian (1619–1687)

Reverend Sylvester Maurus
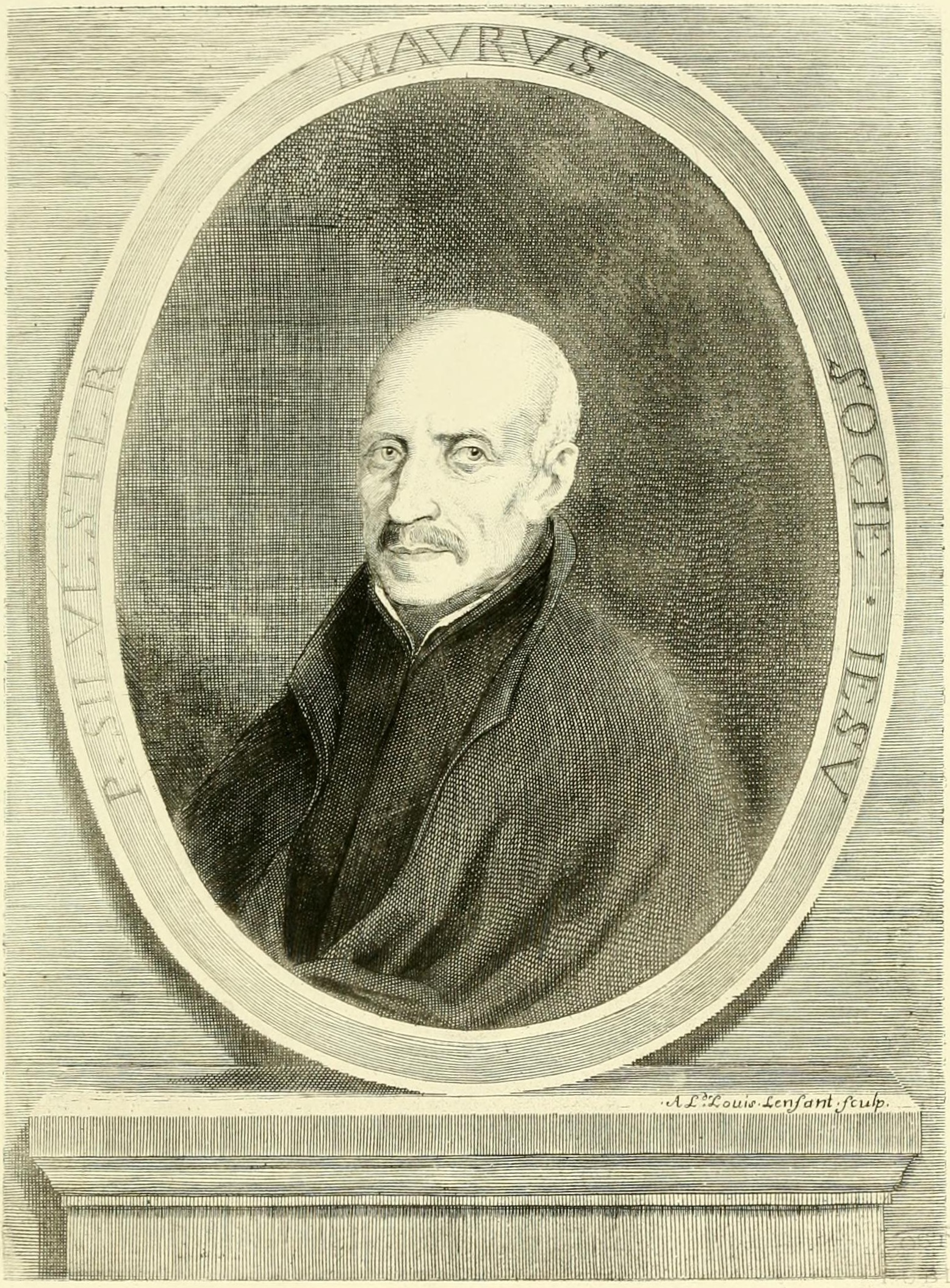
- Born: Silvestro Mauro; December 31, 1619; Spoleto, Papal States
- Died: 13 January 1687 (aged 67); Rome, Papal States
- Occupations: Jesuit priest; Theologian; Scholar
- Known for: Paraphrases and commentaries on all the works of Aristotle
- Parent(s): Andrea Mauro and Livia Mauro (née Zucconi)

Academic background
- Education: Roman College
- Doctoral advisor: Francesco Sforza Pallavicino
- Influences: Aristotle; Thomas Aquinas

Academic work
- Discipline: Philosophy
- Sub-discipline: Metaphysics, Theology
- School or tradition: Aristotelianism
- Institutions: Roman College
- Influenced: Matteo Liberatore; Franz Ehrle

Sylvester Maurus SJ (31 December 1619 – 13 January 1687) was an Italian Scholastic theologian.

== Life ==
Sylvester Maurus was born in Spoleto, Italy, on 31 December 1619 to a noble family. He entered the Society of Jesus, 21 April 1636. After his novitiate, he spent three years (1639–1642) studying philosophy at the Roman College, where his principal teacher was Sforza Pallavicino. Following a period in which he taught grammar, Maurus studied theology from 1644 to 1648, again at the Roman College. Having completed his theological program, he taught philosophy at the Jesuit college in Macerata from 1649 to 1652. Recalled to Rome, he served a year as regent of studies for Jesuit seminarians. He took final vows in the Order in 1654, and five years later was promoted to the Chair of Theology, which he retained until his appointment in 1684 as Rector of the Roman College. Maurus died on 13 January 1687 in Rome. Besides numerous theological works, he wrote Quaestionum Philosophicarum L. Quinque, and also a paraphrase of all the works of Aristotle. This latter embodies the results of the great thirteenth-century commentaries and is considered a model of clearness and conciseness. Maurus worked on the Greek text and the best Latin versions available in his time, namely those by Argyropoulos, Bessarion, Theodorus Gaza and Lambin.

== Works ==
His works include:

- Quæstionum philosophicarum Sylvestri Mauri, Soc. Jesu, in Collegio Romano Philosophiæ Professoris. This work is divided into four books, and appeared at Rome in 1658. A second edition was issued in 1670. The latest edition, in three volumes, is prefaced by a letter of Father Matteo Liberatore, and appeared in Le Mans, 1875–1876.
- Aristotelis opera quæ extant omnia, brevi paraphrasi, ac litteræ perpetuo inhærente explanatione illustrata. The work appeared in six volumes, Rome, 1668. The second volume, containing Aristotle's moral philosophy, was edited anew in 1696–1698. The whole work was published again in Paris, 1885–1887, by Ehrle, Felchlin, and Beringer; this edition formed part of the collection entitled Bibliotheca Theologiæ et Philosophiæ scholasticæ.
- Quæstionum theologicarum, libri sex, published at Rome, 1676–1679; this work contains all the principal theological treatises.
- Opus theologicum, published in three folio volumes at Rome, 1687, treats of all the main questions of theology concisely. The first volume contains some information concerning the author, and also his picture engraved by Louis Lenfant.

== Bibliography ==
- Sommervogel, Carlos. Bibliothèque de la Compagnie de Jésus. Vol. V. pp. 765 ff.
- Amann, Émile, Dictionnaire de théologie catholique 10.1:447–448.
- Lascaris Comneno, Constantino (1949). "Los comentarios de Silvestre Mauro a la Física de Aristóteles". Revista de filosofía. 8: 459–468.
- Benedetto, A.J. (2003). "Maurus, Sylvester". New Catholic Encyclopedia. Vol. 9 (2 ed.). Detroit: Thomson/Gale. p. 374.
- Doyle, John P. (1996). "Silvester Mauro, S.J. (1619-1687) on Four Degrees of Abstraction". International Philosophical Quarterly. 36 (4): 461–474. doi:10.5840/ipq199636445.
- Andres, Anthony (2003). "Commentary on the Isogoge of Porphyry, Translated from the Latin, with an Introduction". Faith & Reason. 28 (2): 209–250.
