= Terenzio Alciati =

Italian Jesuit author (1570–1651)

Reverend Terenzio Alciati
- Born: November , 1570; Rome, Papal States
- Died: 12 November 1651 (aged 80–81); Rome, Papal States
- Occupations: Catholic priest, historian, theologian, writer

Academic work
- Era: Counter-Reformation
- Discipline: History
- Institutions: Roman College
- Influenced: Francesco Sforza Pallavicino

Terenzio Alciati SJ (November 1570 – 12 November 1651) was an Italian Jesuit and author. He is best known for his influential studies on the history of the Council of Trent.

== Biography ==
Terenzio Alciati was born in Rome in November 1570. He belonged to a noble and wealthy family, originally from Milan. He entered the Society of Jesus on 9 March 1591. Alciati taught philosophy for five years, and theology for seventeen years at the Roman College. He subsequently became studiorum præfectus of the college and held the office for thirteen years, whereupon he was appointed vice-præpositus of the professed house in Rome. Esteemed by the cardinals for his learning, he was appointed censor by the Holy Office; the Congregation for Divine Worship chose him their consultor, and he became director of the Apostolic Penitentiary. In the ninth General Congregation, Alciati was the deputy of the Roman province. The Superior general of the Society of Jesus Francesco Piccolomini appointed him vice-provincial the Jesuit province of Rome. Alciati died of apoplexy on 12 November 1651.

== Works ==
Alciati is the author of several historical and theological works written in Italian, and published under the pen name of Erminius Tacitus. Alegambe gives their titles in his Bibliotheca Scriptorum Societatis Jesu. Alciati was commissioned by Pope Urban VIII to refute Sarpi, the author of the Istoria del Concilio Tridentino, but death prevented him from accomplishing this work. However, he had collected valuable materials, of which Cardinal Francesco Sforza Pallavicino afterwards made use for his Istoria del Concilio di Trento.

== Bibliography ==
- Picinelli, Filippo (1670). Ateneo dei letterati milanesi. Milan: Francesco Vigone. pp. 501–2.
- Mazzucchelli, Giammaria (1753). Gli Scrittori d'Italia. Vol. I, 1. Brescia: Giambatista Bossini. p. 375.
- Tiraboschi, Girolamo (1785). Storia della letteratura italiana. Vol. VIII. Rome. p. 115.
- Plate, William (1843). "Alciati, Terenzio". The Biographical Dictionary of the Society for the Diffusion of Useful Knowledge. Vol. 1. Part 2. London: Longman, Brown, Green, and Longmans. p. 758.
- This article incorporates public domain material from McClintock, John; Strong, James (1867–1887). Cyclopædia of Biblical, Theological and Ecclesiastical Literature. Harper and Brothers.
- Amati, Girolamo (1880). Bibliografia romana. Notizie della vita e delle opere degli scrittori romani. Rome: Botta. pp. 5–6.
- Carlos Sommervogel, Bibliothèque de la Compagnie de Jésus, I, Brussels-Paris 1890, col. 147; VIII, ibid. 1898, col. 1601; XII, Toulouse 1911, coll. 57, 915.
- Jedin, Hubert (1948). Das Konzil von Trient. Eine Ueberblick ueber die Erforschung seiner Geschichte. Rome: Edizioni di Storia e Letteratura. pp. 98–103.
- Pirri, Pietro (1960). "ALCIATI, Terenzio". Dizionario Biografico degli Italiani (in Italian). Vol. 2: Albicante–Ammannati. Rome: Istituto dell'Enciclopedia Italiana. OCLC 883370.
