= William Drury (dramatist) =

English dramatist

William Drury (floruit 1641) was an English dramatist.

== Life ==
Drury was an English gentleman "of singular parts and learning". He was for some time imprisoned in England on account of his adherence to the Catholic religion, but around 1616 he was released through the intercession of Count Gondomar, the Spanish ambassador in London. In October 1618 he began to teach poetry and rhetoric at the English College at Douay.

== Works ==
He wrote three Latin plays in verse, which were exhibited with great applause, first privately in the refectory of the college, and afterwards publicly in the quadrangle. These are:

- Alvredus sive Alfredus, Tragi-Comœdia ter exhibita in seminario Anglorum Duaceno ab ejusdem collegii Juventute, Anno Domini m.dc.xix., Douay, 1620, 16mo (on the history of Alfred the Great and his subsequent deliverance of his people). At the end of the volume is a poem entitled ‘De venerabili Eucharistia ab apibus inventa et mirabiliter servata, de qua scribit Cæsarius, lib. 9, cap. 8. Carmen elegiacum.’
- Mors, comœdia. Printed with the preceding work, Douay, 1620, 16mo. Death and the Devil, in person, play the principal parts in this curious drama, or rather farce, of which Douce speaks in laudatory terms in his book on Holbein's ‘Dance of Death’.
- Reparatus, sive Depositum. Tragico-Comœdia. First published, together with the two preceding works, in Drury's ‘Dramatica Poemata,’ Douay, 1628, 12mo; reprinted at Antwerp, 1641, 12mo.
