= William Drury (lawyer) =

- Died: 1589

William Drury (died 1589), civilian, third son of John Drury of Rougham, Suffolk, by Elizabeth, daughter of John Goldingham of Belstead, Suffolk.

== Education ==
Drury was educated at Trinity Hall, Cambridge, where he took the degree of LL.B. in 1553. He was appointed Regius Professor of Civil Law at the University of Cambridge, with a salary of £40 per annum, on 30 January 1558–9, and took the degree of LL.D. in 1560.

== Early posts ==
Admitted advocate at Doctors' Commons on 5 May 1561, he shortly afterwards became secretary to Archbishop Parker. In 1562 Parker appointed him his commissary for the faculties. He was also a member of the ecclesiastical commission as early as 1567, and on 28 June of that year was appointed visitor of the churches, city, and diocese of Norwich.

== Civilian ==
Drury was one of the civilians consulted by Elizabeth in 1571 on the important points of international law raised by the intrigues of John Lesley, the Bishop of Ross on behalf of Mary Stuart. Briefly stated, the questions were firstly whether an ambassador plotting insurrection, or aiding and abetting treason against the sovereign to whom he was accredited, did not forfeit his privileges as an ambassador and become amenable to the ordinary law of the land; and secondly whether a deposed and refugee sovereign was capable by international law of having an ambassador in his land of asylum in such sense as to clothe the ambassador with the personal inviolability ordinarily belonging to his rank.

The civilians answered the first question in a sense adverse to the ambassador, and their decision was held at the time conclusive, and acted on accordingly; but, though much discussed since, it has not been generally approved by publicists, or frequently followed in practice by statesmen.

The second question they answered in the affirmative, adding, however, the proviso, "so long as he do not exceed the bounds of an ambassador". The case is generally regarded by publicists as the locus classicus on the subject.

In June 1571, in his capacity as ambassador, he was sent to Scotland to speak terms with Regent Morton, who represented Mary, Queen of Scots. This resulted in a meeting of forces on the following day 16 June, a skirmish occurred between the opposing sides near his camp at Restalrig. Around 200 men on each side representing Morton on one side and the Earl of Huntly on the other. Drury deliberately misled Huntly and rather than both sides withdrawing a bloody battle ensued. Drury blamed Morton for the treachery. In the account of the skirmish it is stated that Drury lived in Drury Lane in London.

== Later posts, works, opinions ==
On 28 November 1574 Drury received from Archbishop Parker a grant of the advowson of Buxted, Sussex, to hold jointly with the archbishop's son John, and at some date not later than 21 April 1577 he was appointed master of the prerogative court of Canterbury. He was also appointed, on 12 November 1577, locum tenens for Dr. Thomas Yale, Archbishop Grindal's vicar-general. At this time he seems to have incurred some suspicion of popish views. He was sworn master extraordinary in chancery on 10 October 1580, and master in ordinary in chancery 10 February 1585.

In 1584 he was consulted as to the best mode of defending the revenues of the church against an apprehended confiscation by the crown under cover of a writ of melius inquirendum. An opinion drawn up by him on this occasion, in which he advises the collection of evidence to prove that "the tenth part of the fruits of the land is not possessed by the clergy", and certain propositions in the nature of argument to strengthen the case, are preserved in Strype's Annals.

== Death ==
He died shortly before Christmas 1589, and was buried in the church of St. Mary Magdalen, Old Fish Street, London. Drury married Mary, daughter of Sir Richard Southwell of Woodrising, Norfolk, by whom he had issue four sons and two daughters. He lived at Brett's Hall, in the parish of Tendring, Essex. His wife survived him, and married Robert Forth, LL.D., civilian. His eldest son, John, was knighted in 1604. See also Robert Drury (1587–1623) another son.
