= Henry Floyd (Jesuit) =

Henry Floyd (1563–1641) was an English Jesuit.

== Life ==
Floyd was the elder brother of Father John Floyd, born in Cambridgeshire. He received his education in the English College of Douay during its temporary move to Reims. On 8 May 1589, then a deacon, he was sent with other students by Dr. Richard Barret, president of the college, to assist in commencing the new English College founded by Robert Parsons at Valladolid.

For a time he was stationed at the residence or seminary established by Parsons at Lisbon. He was probably ordained priest in 1592, and he defended universal theology at Seville on 20 February 1593. From Lisbon he crossed over to England about 1597, and for nineteen years he was chaplain to Sir John Southcote. In 1599 he entered the Society of Jesus, and in 1618 was professed of the four vows.

He was at various times incarcerated in Newgate Prison, The Clink, and the Fleet Prison in London, and in Framlingham and Winchester gaols. On James I's accession, being sent into banishment with many other priests, he returned to Lisbon, but soon revisited England, and again fell into the hands of the pursuivants.

After serving the mission in the London district for many years, he died in London on 7 March 1641.
