= William Crashaw =

English cleric, academic, and poet

William Crashaw or Crashawe (1572–1626) was an English cleric, academic, and poet.

== Life ==
The son of Richard Crashaw of Handsworth, South Yorkshire, by his wife, Helen, daughter of John Routh of Waleswood, he was born at Handsworth, and baptised there on 26 October 1572. He was educated at St John's College, Cambridge, admitted a sizar there on 1 May 1591. Two years afterwards the bishop of Ely's fellowship at St John's became vacant by the death of Humphrey Hammond; and as the see was then unoccupied, the right of nomination became vested in Queen Elizabeth, who recommended Crashaw.

After being ordained Crashaw became a preacher, first at Bridlington and then at Beverley in Yorkshire. He commenced M.A. in 1595, and proceeded to the degree of B.D. in 1603. In 1604 he was collated to the second prebend in Ripon Minster, and he held it till his death. He was appointed preacher at the Inner Temple.

When Crashaw was presented by Archbishop Edmund Grindal to the rectory of Burton Agnes, Adrian Stokes denied the title of the archbishop to the advowson, and presented William Grene, who was admitted and instituted to the rectory. Sir Edward Coke as attorney-general, took up the dispute on behalf of the Queen, and the result was that Crashaw was removed from the living. He later managed to have this intervention reversed, in 1608. He became prebend of Osbaldwick in York Minster on 2 April 1617, and on 13 November 1618 was admitted to St Mary Matfelon, Whitechapel, London, on the presentation of Sir John North and William Baker.

Crashaw died in 1626, and his will was proved on 16 October of that year.

== Family ==
Crashaw was twice married. His first wife was the mother of the poet Richard Crashaw. He married secondly, at All Hallows Barking on 11 May 1619, Elizabeth Skinner, daughter of Anthony Skinner of the parish. He commemorated her in a privately printed tractate, The Honovr of Vertve, or the Monument erected by the sorowfull Husband, and the Epitaphes annexed by learned and worthy men, to the immortall memory of that worthy gentlewoman, Mrs. Elizabeth Crashawe, who died in child-birth, and was buried in Whit-Chappell, October 8, 1620. In the 24 yeare of her age; James Ussher preached her funeral sermon, at a funeral noted for its large attendance. Crashaw placed a monument to her memory in the chancel of Whitechapel Church.

== Works ==
Crashaw was known as a scholar and preacher, and a strong Protestant. His main works were:

- Romish Forgeries and Falsifications, together with Catholike Restitutions, London, 1606.
- Newes from Italy, of a second Moses, or the life of Galeacius Caracciolus, the noble Marquesse of Vico, translated, London, 1608. Other editions appeared, some of which have the title The Italian Convert. On 4 July 1609 Crashaw was "convented" before the convocation of the province of Canterbury for publishing an erroneous book, seemingly this translation of the Life of Galeazzo Caraccioli. He agreed to retract it. The Life was originally written in Italian by Niccolo Balbani; Theodore Beza made a Latin version.
- The Sermon preached at the Crosse, Feb. xiiij. 1607. Justified by the Authour, both against Papist and Brownist, to be the truth: Wherein this point is principally followed; namely, that the religion of Rome, as now it stands established, is worse than ever it was, London, 1608.
- A Sermon preached before the right honorable the Lord Lawarre, Lord Governour and Captaine Generall of Virginea, and others of his Maiesties Counsell for that Kingdome, and the rest of the Adventurers in that Plantation, Feb. 21, 1609, London, 1610. Alexander Balloch Grosart wrote that "there is no nobler sermon than this of the period". It has an anti-theatrical theme, and finishes with a dialogue involving God, England and Virginia.
- The Jesuites Gospel, written by themselves, discovered and published, London, 1610, 1621; reprinted in 1641 under the title of The Bespotted Jesuite, whose Gospell is full of Blasphemy against the Blood of Christ, London, 1641; and again in 1643, under the title of Loyola's Disloyalty, or the Jesuites in Open Rebellion against God and His Church, London, 1643.
- Manuale Catholicorum: a Manuall for true Catholickes (Enchiridion piarum Precum et Meditationum. A Handful, or rather a Heartfull of Holy Meditations and Prayers), Latin and English, London, 1611. A poetical work, in two divisions. Other editions appeared in 1616 and 1622.
- Consilium quorundam Episcoporum Bononiæ congregatorum quod de ratione stabiliendæ Romanæ Ecclesiæ Julio III Pont. Max. datum est. Quo artes et astutiæ Romanensium et arcana Imperii Papalis non pauca propalantur, London, 1613. Dedicated to Henry Wriothesley, 3rd Earl of Southampton.
- The Complaint, or Dialogue betwixt the Soule and the Bodie of a damned man. Supposed to be written by S. Bernard, from a nightly vision of his; and now published out of an ancient manuscript copie, London, 1616. The poem, the original and translation occupying alternate pages, is divided into 85 verses, as a dialogue between the author, a soul departed, a dead carcase, and the devils. The volume, consisting of thirty-four leaves, is dedicated to some of the translator's friends, benchers of the Inner Temple.
- Fiscus Papalis, sive Catalogus Indulgentiarum et reliquiarum septem principalium Ecclesiarum Urbis Romæ, ex vet. MS. descriptus, London, 1617, 1621.
- Milke for Babes, or a North Countrie Catechisme, made plaine and easy to the capacitie of the countrie people, second impression, London, 1618.
- The Parable of Poyson. In five sermons of spirituale poyson, London, 1618.
- The New Man; or a Supplication from an unknowne person, a Roman Catholike, unto James, the Monarch of Great Brittaine, touching a necessity of a Generall Councell to be forthwith assembled against him that now usurps the Papall Chaire under the name of Paul the Fifth, London, 1622.
- The Fatall Vesper, or a trve and pvnctvall relation of that lamentable and fearfull accident, hapning on the 26 of October last by the fall of a roome in the Black-Friers, in which were assembled many people at a Sermon which was to be preached by Father Drvrie, a Iesvite London, 1623. Tract on the Fatal Vespers, generally attributed to Crashaw.
- Ad Severinum Binnium Lovaniensem Theologum Epistola Commonitoria super Conciliorum Generalium editione ab ipso nuper adornata, London, 1624.
- Mittimus to the Jubilee at Rome, or the Rates of the Pope's Custom-House, sent to the Pope as a New Year's Gift from England, London, 1625.
- A Discoverye of Popishe Corruption, requiring a kingley reformation, left in manuscript (Royal MS. 17 B. viii).

== Notes ==
Attribution

- This article incorporates text from a publication now in the public domain: Stephen, Leslie, ed. (1888). "Crashaw, William". Dictionary of National Biography. Vol. 13. London: Smith, Elder & Co.
