= L'Adone =

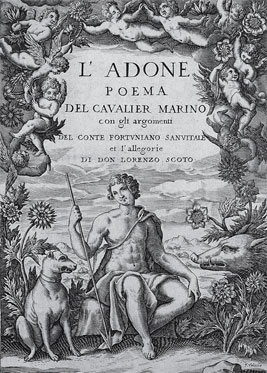
- Frontispiece of the first edition.
- Language: it
- Genre: Poetry
- Publication date: 1623-1625

L'Adone (Adonis) is an epic poem in Italian by Giovan Battista Marino, first published in Paris in 1623 by Olivier de Varennes (1598-1666) and dedicated to Louis XIII. It tells the love story of Venus and the eponymous Adonis and with 5,124 ottave and 40,992 verses is one of the longest poems in Italian literature - it is slightly longer than Orlando furioso and around three times as long as the Divina Commedia and Gerusalemme liberata.

Before its twenty canti, the volume also contains a preface by the French critic Jean Chapelain justifying the poem as an epic but not heroic "poem of peace", followed by an introductory letter addressed to queen Marie de' Medici (then ruling as regent for her son Louis) asking her to intercede with the king on the poet's behalf.

Before each canto is a prose 'Argomenti' ('Arguments') by Fortuniano Sanvitale and Allegorie ('Allegories'), attributed to don Lorenzo Scoto. These are both intended to demonstrate the text's moral significance and its message that (as stated in the preface) "immoderate pleasure ends in pain".

Each canto is preceded by prose "Arguments" composed by Fortuniano Sanvitale and "Allegories" attributed to Don Lorenzo Scoto, which are supposed to explain the moral meaning of the text (whose teaching, as stated in the preface, is "immoderate pleasure ends in pain"). The last nineteen canti each have a title and a six-octave preface, though the first canto has a twelve octave preface.

== Writing ==
Marino took his whole life to write the work, starting during his time in Naples and finally publishing it in Paris. Its progress can be tracked through mentions in his letters and in prefaces to his other works. He wrote of it as an idyllic poem in 1584, including descriptions of his loves and of his death. In 1605 the work seems to have first been published in three canti, one each on falling in love, loves and death. As of 1614 it consisted of "just over a thousand verses" in four canti (loves, amusements, departure, death) and the following year Marino wrote to Fortuniano Sanvitale from Turin, stating that the poem was divided up into twelve canti and was as long as Gerusalemme liberata and that he intended to publish it when he reached Paris.

On arrival in Paris in 1616 Marino wrote a letter stating that the poem "is divided up into 24 canti and is as long as Orlando Furioso", although - as mentioned above - it was later published in 20 canti not 24. This clearly indicates how complex the poem already was even at that stage. The poem's true size is shown by a manuscript now in Paris, known as "Adone1616", which contains its first three canti, in which it is dedicated to Maria de' Medici and her favourite Concino Concini.

However, the abrupt change in the political situation at court (with Louis seizing power, removing his mother and having Concini violently killed) forced Marino to revisit the poem. It was completely revised between 1617 and 1621 and expanded to the huge twenty canti of the final version, dedicated to Louis with Maria's intercession, with the original ottave dedicated to Concini downgraded to become canto XI.

A 1614 document known as the 'Claretti Letter' shows where Marino go the material for this full revision. It is a dedicatory letter which opens the third part of Marino's Rime, signed by Onorato Claretti but in Marino's handwriting. Some scattered references in the poet's letters speak at length of the many poetic projects he was then drafting, of which little or no other trace remains, namely Trasformazioni, Gerusalemme distrutta (of which only canto VII survives, published posthumously), Polifemo and Polinnia. The descriptions the poet gives of these lost works matches many parts of L'Adone and they were probably recycled in various ways, possibly in Canti V-VII and XIX-XX.

Some letters (such as a 1619 letter from Marino to Ottavio Magnanini stating that Adonis would be killed by Mars in the form of a boar, something that does not happen in the poem) and from the vastness of the errata (in which whole sequences of stanzas are sometimes added), Marino was like Ariosto in that he kept interacting with the poem until the very end, even while it was being printed.

== Reception ==
=== Church ===
As soon as the poem was published Marino returned to Italy, where he had unresolved questions to answer to the Inquisition. A work like L'Adone was a poor fit for Italy under the newly-elected Pope Urban VIII and sumptuous Barberini Rome. Urban's intervention against Marino was one of the first acts of his pontificate and aimed at clearing up the ambiguous relations between the intelligentsia and the Church and discouraging the spread of some cultural attitudes. It could even be seen as the first step on the road to the condemnation of Galileo Galilei in 1633.

On 22 April 1624 cardinal Giannettino Doria lodged a complaint against the poem (though ironically he was dedicatee of Lira III), followed by a condemnation from Urban (who would sign all three decrees against the poem) on 11 June. That condemnation did allow for the possibility of Marino correcting the poem and left the question of publishing the work in Rome open. Marino was very keen on publishing the work in Rome but had no more than a month to spare to bring it about. He made some corrections before leaving Rome for Naples, leaving further corrections to Antonio Bruni and Girolamo Preti under the instruction of Father Vincenzo Martinelli, 'socius' of the Master of the Sacro Palazzo (the top papal censorship body). However, nothing was done until the year was almost over - Marino did not continue to make corrections and Martinelli, Bruni and Preti do not appear to have rewritten a single line, even though Martinelli had officially been put in charge of correcting the work.

Clearly Marino's friends and the Holy Office itself had got to know the work well enough to realise that lasiciviousness played a minor role in its overall structure and that the incriminating passages were among the least serious even by the criteria of that time (as supported by Giovanni Pozzi). Even so, the sacred material continually alluded to behind the poem's plot certainly annoyed the catholic elite. Finally, on 27 November, the poem was condemned as having "corrupt morals due to its extreme obscenity", though the harsh sentence was not made public. His friend cardinal Carlo Emanuel Pio of Savoy took on the case of L'Adone.

A second condemnation followed on 17 July 1625, after Marino's death, leading his friends and men of letters (especially from the Accademia degli Umoristi) to begin a decades long campaign to seek a compromise from the Holy Office. Nothing concrete remains of what would eventually be done to the body of L'Adone. The campaigners fought on several fronts, firstly in a series of hagiographies, before gradually concentrating their energies on the quarrel sparked by "L'Occhiale" by Tommaso Stigliani (1627).

A third condemnation on 5 November 1626 was definitive, though the work continued to be republished for the rest of the century both abroad (especially by Elsevier), in Venice and in 1789 in Livorno (with the fake publication place of London). Even so, this third condemnation had a broader and longer significance that transcends even the demands of that climate and that papacy. Urban issued another condemnation against the rest of the work on 12 April 1688, as did pope Innocent XI on 27 September 1678. The work was hugely successful even after all these condemnations and remained in print.

=== Literary critics ===
As with Gerusalemme liberata, the poem unleashed a storm as soon as it was released - Tommaso Stigliani's pamphlet L'occhiale (1627, Venice) denounced its literary "thefts" and the general plot's incoherence. This was followed by several more over the course of the century both against Marino and supporting him:

1. Agostino Lampugnani, Antiocchiale
2. Andrea Barbazza, Le Strigliate a Tommaso Stigliani per Robusto Pogommega (1629) and Le Staffilate di Giovanni Capponi (1637);
3. Girolamo Aleandro il Giovane, Difesa dell'Adone (1629);
4. Gauges de Gozze, Vaglio etrusco e una Difesa d'alcuni luoghi principali dell'Adone rimasti manoscritti;
5. Scipione Errico, L'Occhiale appannato (1629);
6. Nicola Villani, Uccellatura di Vincenzo Foresi all'Occhiale del cavalier Tommaso Stigliani (1630) e Considerationi di Messer Fagiano sopra la seconda parte dell'Occhiale del cavalier Stigliani (1631);
7. Angelico Aprosio Il vaglio critico di Masoto Galistoni da Terama, sopra Il mondo nuovo del cavalier Tomaso Stigliani da Matera (1637), Il buratto (1642), L'Occhiale stritolato (1642), La sferza poetica di Sapricio Saprici... per risposta alla Prima censura dell'Adone del Cavalier Marino fatta del Cavalier Tommaso Stigliani (1643) and Del veratro: apologia di Sapricio Saprici per risposta alla seconda censura dell'Adone del cavalier Marino, fatta dal cavalier Tommaso Stigliani (le cui due parti uscirono invertite, la I. nel 1645 e la II. nel 1647);
8. Teofilo Gallaccini, Considerazioni sopra l'Occhiale,
9. Giovanni Pietro D'Alessandro, Difesa dell'Adone;
10. Francesco Busenello, La Coltre, ovvero Lo Stigliani sbalzato

The criticisms usually centred on three aspects of the work:

- the lack of unity in the general plot of the poem, with a large number of interruptions and subplots
- the frankly erotic tone of part of the work, also connected with its religious themes (for example, the Christological traits in the portrayal of Adonis could have been meant to ridicule Catholicism but more probably the author's exclusive classicism meant he lent them no significance)
- the literary imitations and plagiarism flaunted in it, especially those to the detriment of contemporaries such as Stigliani himself

Marino himself only replied to these criticisms privately and indirectly in his letters, lending little credence to the opinions of the 'pedantuzzi', the various comparisons with Gerusalemme liberata and the accusations of plagiarism.

== Musical adaptations ==
- Ottavio Tronsarelli, La catena d'Adone, favola boschereccia (Ciotti, Venezia 1626), set to music by Domenico Mazzocchi, revived and recorded in the modern era
- Paolo Vendramin, Adone. Tragedia musicale rappresentata in Venezia l'anno 1639 nel teatro de' SS. Giovanni e Paolo (Sarzina, Venice 1640),
- Giovan Matteo Giannini, L'Adone. Drama per musica (Venice 1676),
- L'Adone. Intermedio musicale per l'Accademia degl'Uniti (Bosio, Venice c.1690)
- Rinaldo Cialli, La Falsirena. Drama per musica da rappresentarsi nel teatro di S. Angelo l'anno 1690 (Nicolini, Venezia, 1690 circa).

== Critical editions ==
- L'Adone, ed. critica e commento a cura di G. Pozzi, Milano, Mondadori, 1976 [republished several times by Adelphi];
- L'Adone, ed. critica a cura di M. Pieri, Bari, Laterza, 1975-1977.
- L'Adone, ed. critica e commento a cura di M. Pieri, Roma, Istituto Poligrafico dello Stato, 1996.
- L'Adone, ed. critica e commento riveduto e corretto a cura di M. Pieri, La Finestra editrice, Lavis 2007 ISBN 978-8888097-69-5.
- L'Adone, ed. critica e commento a cura di E. Russo, Milano, Rizzoli, 2013.

== Bibliography (in Italian) ==
- C. Colombo, Cultura e tradizione nell'Adone di Giovan Battista Marino, Padova-Roma, Antenore, 1967.
- E. Taddeo, Studi sul Marino, Firenze, Sandron, 1971.
- F. Guardiani, La meravigliosa retorica dell'«Adone» di G.B. Marino, Firenze. 1989.
- F. Guardiani, a cura di, Lectura Marini, University of Toronto Italian Studies, 6, Ottawa, 1989.
- S. Zatti, L'Adone e la crisi dell'epica, in L'ombra del Tasso, Mondadori, Milano, 1996, pp. 208–230.
- M.F. Tristan, Sileno barocco. Il Cavalier Marino fra sacro e profano, La Finestra, Trento, 2008.
- E. Russo, a cura di, Marino e il Barocco, da Napoli a Parigi, Ed. dell'Orso, Alessandria, 2009.
- M. Corradini, In terra di letteratura. Poesia e poetica di Giovan Battista Marino, Argo, Lecce, 2012.
- R. Ubbidiente (ed.) L'Adone di Giovan Battista Marino. Mito-Movimento-Maraviglia, Atti del Convegno dell'Universi\tà di Berlino, Aragno, Torino, 2012.
- S. Tomassini, I libretti di Adone (1623-1900), Legenda, Torino, 2003.
- M. Leone, Classicismo e moralità: una singolare difesa (1639) della licenziosità dell’Adone, in Il classicismo e culture di Antico Regime, a cura di Amedeo Quondam, Bulzoni, Roma, 2010, pp. 333–366.
- Riga, P. G. (2015). "Polemiche e sodalità intorno a Marino. Le "Strigliate" di Andrea Barbazza". Studi secenteschi (56): 103–116.
