= Agostino Lampugnani =

Italian Benedictine monk and scholar

Dom Agostino Lampugnani OSB
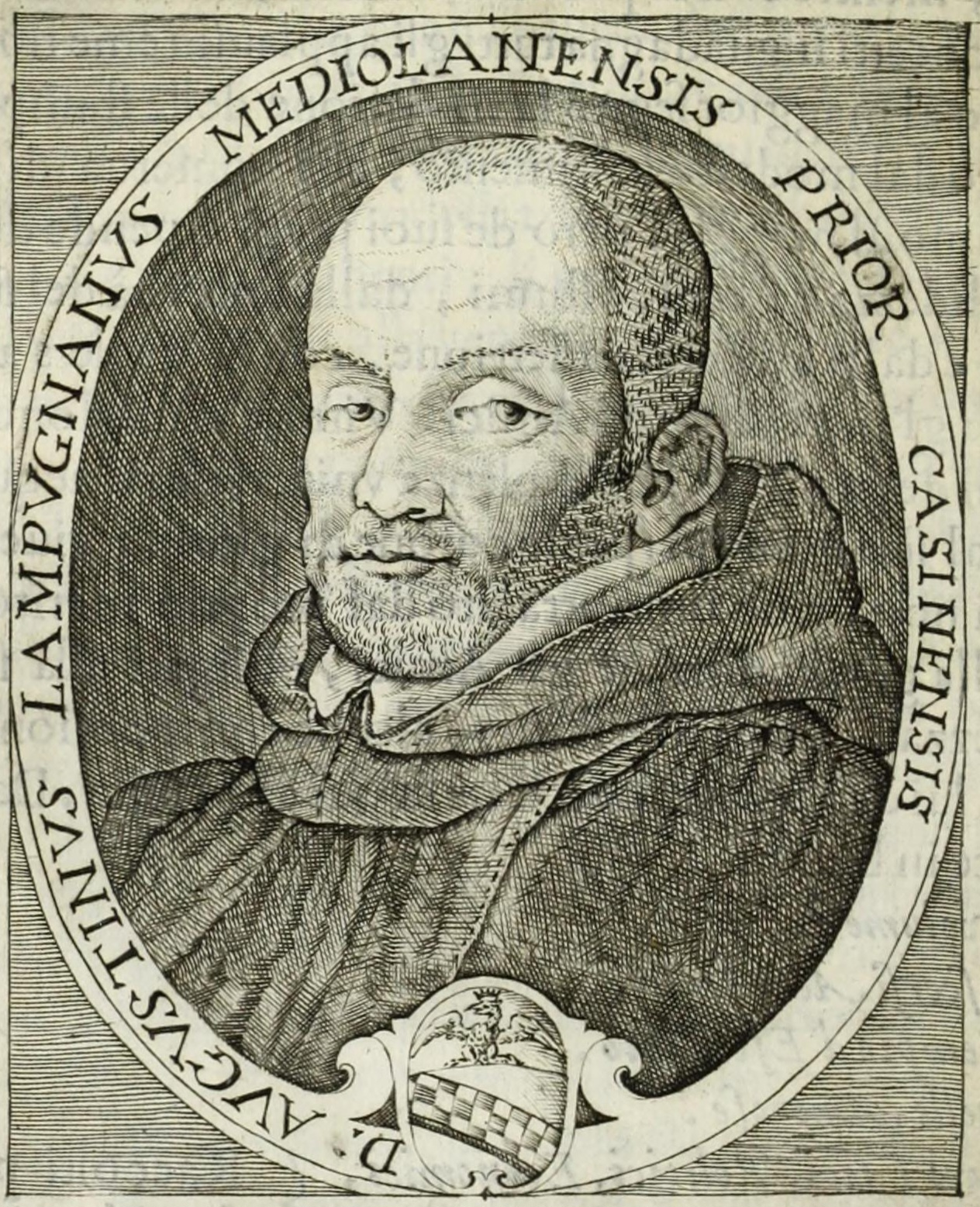
- Portrait of Agostino Lampugnani from the book "Le glorie degli Incogniti", 1647
- Title: abbot

Personal life
- Born: Giovan Battista Lampugnani c. 1586 Milan, Duchy of Milan
- Died: 29 January 1657 Milan, Duchy of Milan
- Parent: Pietro Antonio Lampugnani (father)
- Other name: Giovan Battista Mognalpina
- Occupation: Benedictine monk; Intellectual; Writer

Religious life
- Religion: Roman Catholicism
- Order: Benedictines
- Ordination: 1599

Agostino Lampugnani OSB (c. 1586 – 29 January 1657) was an Italian Benedictine monk and Baroque writer.

== Biography ==
Giovan Battista Lampugnani was born in Milan around 1586 into a prominent noble family. He joined the Benedictine Order in 1599, taking the name of Agostino and entering the Milanese monastery of San Simpliciano. An accomplished Latinist and scholar, in the early 1630s he became a member of the Accademia degli Incogniti of Venice. He befriended Angelico Aprosio, with whom he conducted a regular correspondence which would last until the end of his life. Lampugnani was prior of Santo Spirito in Pavia until 1640. He subsequently became prior of San Procolo in Bologna, where he lived for some years. He became a member of the Accademia degli Indomiti and befriended several Bolognese writers and artists, including Andrea Barbazza and Giovan Francesco Neri. Lampugnani distinguished himself by his academic lectures, which were later published in Milan under the title Diporti academici. In 1642 he published in Venice, under the pseudonym of Giovan Battista Mognalpina, the chivalric romance Il Celidoro, one of the most successful Italian novels of the 17th century. In the late 1640s Lampugnani moved definitively to Milan. In his later years, he tried to have all his books published in a single edition, but died in 1657 before the project could be realized.

== Works ==
Lampugnani was an erudite and prolific author. He is best known for his part in the polemics over Giambattista Marino's Adone; his Antiocchiale (Anti-spyglass, 1629) argued against Tommaso Stigliani in favour of Marino. The work was never published probably due to the intervention of the Inquisition. Lampugnani sent the manuscript to Aprosio, who included it in his collection as part of the library that he established in his native Ventimiglia. Lampugnani wrote also a detailed account of the plague that struck Milan around 1630, a key source for Manzoni's description of the plague in his novel The Betrothed. Lampugnani's lively satire La Carrozza da nolo (The Rented Carriage, 1648) marks the entrance of the word moda (fashion) into the Italian lexicon.

== List of works ==
- Clio plaudens et exultans in serenissimi principis Venetiarum Antonii de Priulis electionem. Venice: Antonio Pinelli. 1618.
- Cecilia predicante, rappresentatione sacra di d. Agostino Lampugnano monaco Cassinese. Venice: Francesco Baba. 1619.
- La ninfa guerriera fauola pastorale di Gio. Battista Lampugnano. Venice: Marco Ginami. 1624.
- Il Celidoro. Bologna: Carlo Zenero. 1642.
- La pestilenza seguita in Milano l'anno 1630 raccontata da Agostino Lampugnano priore di S. Simpliciano. Milan: Carlo Ferrandi. 1634.
- Sette strali d'amore vibrati da Giesù Christo in croce all'anima fedele spiegati da D. Agostino Lampugnani, priore casinense. Bologna: Giovanni Battista Ferroni. 1640.
- Turrianae propaginis arbor explicita D. Augustini Lampugnani, mediolanensis patritij, monaci cassinensis. Bologna: Giacomo Monti. 1642.
- Squittinio d'amore opera academica di don Agostino Lampugnani. Bologna: Nicolò Tebaldini. 1643.
- L'Heroe mendico ouero De' gesti di S. Alessio ... libri cinque di d. Agostino Lampugnani. Milan: Filippo Ghisolfi. 1645.
- Della carrozza da nolo, overo del vestire e usanze alla moda. Bologna: Carlo Zenero. 1648.
- Della carrozza di ritorno, ouero dell'esame del vestire e costumi alla moda, libri due di Gio. Tanso Mognalpina. Milan: Lodovico Monza. 1650.
- Lumi della lingua italiana diffusi da regole abbreuiate, e dubbi esaminati per lo Fuggitiuo Academ. Indomito. Bologna: Carlo Zenero. 1652.
- Diporti Academici di d. Agostino Lampognani abbate casinense hauuti in diuerse Academie. Dedicati all'illustriss. et eccellentiss. sig. don Luigi de Benauides Cariglio. Milan: Lodovico Monza. 1653.

== Bibliography ==
- «Agostino Lampugnani Milanese». In : Le glorie de gli Incogniti: o vero, Gli huomini illustri dell'Accademia de' signori Incogniti di Venetia, In Venetia : appresso Francesco Valuasense stampator dell'Accademia, 1647, pp. 10–13 (on-line).
- Picinelli, Filippo (1670). Ateneo dei letterati milanesi. Milan: Vigone. pp. 3–4.
- Armellini, Mariano (1731). Bibliotheca Benedictino Casinensis, sive scriptorum Casinensis Congregationis alias Sanctae Iustinae Patavinae, qui in ea ad haec usque tempora floruerunt, operum ac gestorum notitiae. Assisi: Campitelli. pp. 62–65.
- Spada, Gabriella (1977). "Notizie sulla vita e sulle opere di Agostino Lampugnani (1586? - 1666?)". Manzoni e Il Seicento Lombardo. Milan: Vita e Pensiero: 54–72.
- Cirilli, Fiammetta (2004). "LAMPUGNANI, Agostino". Dizionario Biografico degli Italiani (in Italian). Vol. 63: Labroca–Laterza. Rome: Istituto dell'Enciclopedia Italiana. ISBN 978-88-12-00032-6.
- Paulicelli, Eugenia (2016). "La Moda and its Technologies: Agostino Lampugnani's La Carrozza da nolo, ovvero del vestire e usanze alla moda (The rented carriage or of clothing and fashionable habits, 1648–1650)". Writing Fashion in Early Modern Italy. Routledge: 205–224. ISBN 9781134787036.
- Ceriotti, Luca (2016). "Libro in stampa, casa in piazza. Aprosio, Lampugnani e la fatica dell'apparire". In Clizia Carminati; Paolo Procaccioli; Corrado Viola; Emilio Russo (eds.). Archilet. Per uno studio delle corrispondenze letterarie di età moderna, atti del seminario internazionale (Bergamo, 11-12 dicembre 2014). Verona: QuiEdit. pp. 427–459. ISBN 978-88-6464-370-0.
- Bongrani, Paolo (2019). "Testimonianze dialettali in un 'Diporto academico' di Agostino Lampugnani (1653)". In Stefania Baragetti; Rosa Necchi; Anna Maria Salvadè (eds.). Geografie e storie letterarie. Studi per William Spaggiari. Milan: LED. pp. 77–82. ISBN 978-88-7916-894-6.
- Nigro, Paola (2020). "La parola moda tra Rinascimento e Barocco: la camicia e la gorgiera nelle opere di Cesare Vecellio e di Agostino Lampugnani". In Elena Pîrvu (ed.). Lingua e letteratura italiana nel presente e nella storia: atti del X Convegno internazionale di italianistica dell'Università di Craiova, 14-15 settembre 2018. Florence: Franco Cesati editore. pp. 463–472. ISBN 978-88-7667-859-2.
- Bongrani, Paolo (2020). "Agostino Lampugnani grammatico e il confronto col fiorentino: tra lingua e dialetti". Studi di grammatica italiana. XXXVIII: 217–245.
