= Scipione Errico =

Italian Baroque writer (1592–1670)

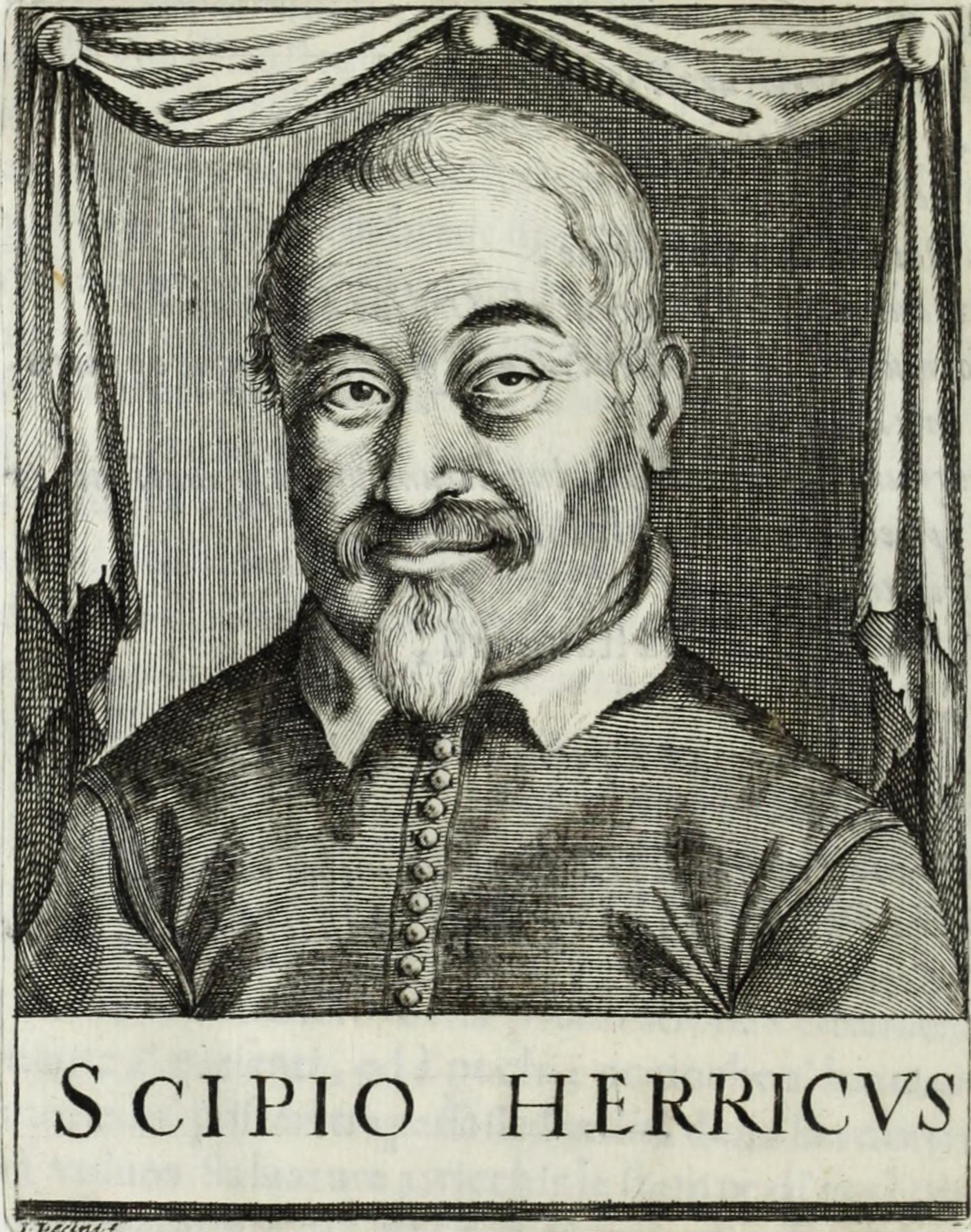
- Portrait of Scipione Errico from the book "Le glorie degli Incogniti", 1647
- Born: 1592; Messina, Kingdom of Sicily
- Died: 18 September 1670 (aged 77–78); Messina, Kingdom of Sicily
- Occupations: Poet; Writer; Literary critic; Academic
- Employer: University of Messina
- Writing career
- Language: Italian language
- Period: 17th century; Baroque literature
- Genres: Poetry; pamphlet; treatise; novel
- Notable works: L'occhiale appannato Le guerre di Parnaso
- Literary movement: Baroque; Marinism

Scipione Errico (Italian: [ʃiˈpjoːne erˈriːko]; 1592 – 18 September 1670) was an Italian poet, writer, literary critic and academic.

== Biography ==
Left an orphan at an early age, he devoted himself to ecclesiastical studies in his native Messina, obtaining a degree in theology. He made his literary debut while still a student, with Endimione and Arianna (1611), two poems in the new genre of the mythological idyll. His ecclesiastical career later took him to Rome and Venice. In 1665, he was appointed professor of moral philosophy at the University of Messina. He died in Messina on 18 September 1670. He was a member of the Roman Accademia degli Umoristi and of the Venetian Accademia degli Incogniti.

== Works ==
Errico's Rime (1619), which enjoyed considerable success, combine graceful musicality and the ingenious mode of expression customary in Italian conceptismo. His heroic epos La Babilonia distrutta (1623) narrates the destruction of Baghdad by the Christian Tartars after the model of Torquato Tasso's Jerusalem Delivered. In his critical writings Errico defended Giambattista Marino against Tommaso Stigliani. His dialogue entitled L'occhiale appannato (Tarnished Spyglass, 1629), one of the first and most acute commentaries of Marino's Adone, argued that the poem should be compared not with Homer's epic poems but with Ovid's Metamorphoses. In his two novels, Le guerre di Parnaso (The Riots of Parnassus, 1625) and Le liti di Pindo (1634), inspired by Lucian's satires, Errico invokes poetic freedom from Aristotelian rules. In 1640, he published Della guerra troiana an epic poem about the Trojan War. He also penned a diatribe against Paolo Sarpi. Errico wrote the libretto for Cavalli's Deidamia, first performed at the Teatro Novissimo, Venice, in 1644. Many of his lyrics are included in Benedetto Croce's influential anthology of Baroque poetry.

== Bibliography ==
- «Scipione Errico messinese». In : Le glorie de gli Incogniti: o vero, Gli huomini illustri dell'Accademia de' signori Incogniti di Venetia, In Venetia : appresso Francesco Valuasense stampator dell'Accademia, 1647, pp. 396–399 (on-line).
- Contarino, Rosario (1993). "ERRICO, Scipione". Dizionario Biografico degli Italiani (in Italian). Vol. 43: Enzo–Fabrizi. Rome: Istituto dell'Enciclopedia Italiana. ISBN 978-88-12-00032-6.
- Slawinski, M. (2002). "Errico, Scipione". In Peter Hainsworth; David Robey (eds.). The Oxford Companion to Italian Literature. Oxford University Press. ISBN 978-0-19-818332-7.
