= Angelico Aprosio =

Italian Augustine monk, scholar, and bibliophile

Angelico Aprosio OSA
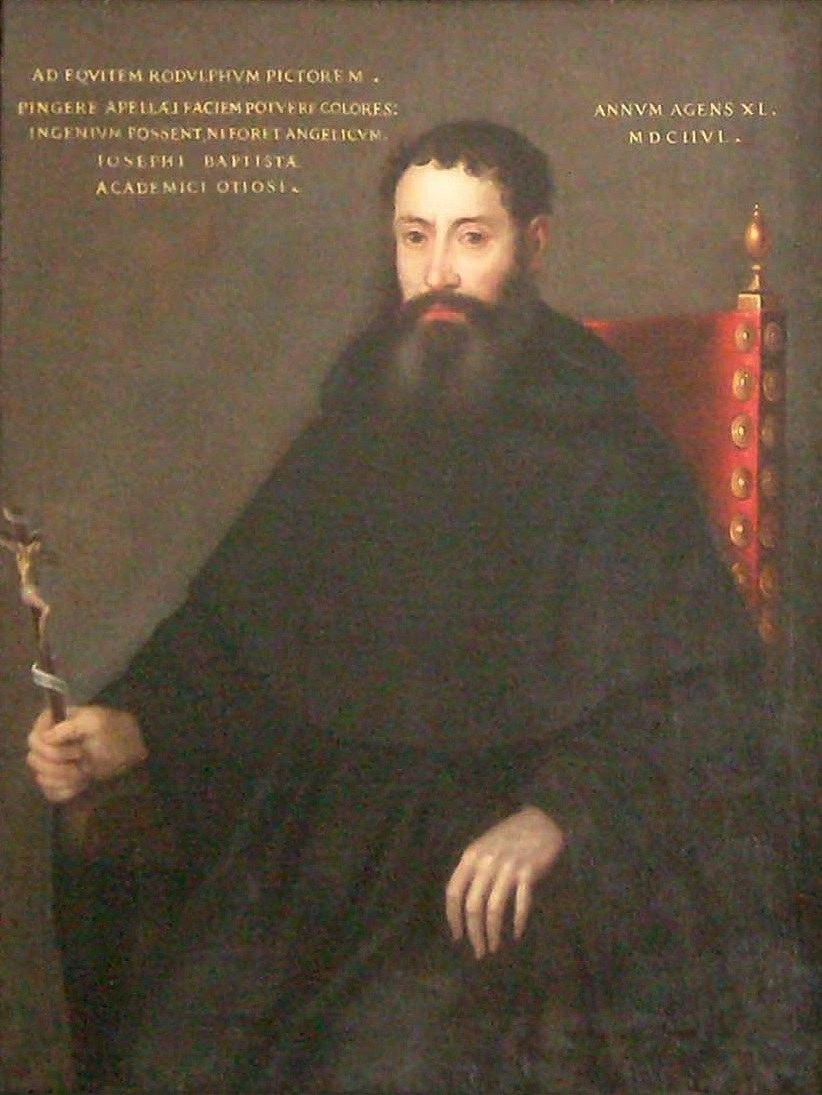
- Angelico Aprosio
- Title: Vicar general

Personal life
- Born: Ludovico Aprosio; October 29, 1607 Ventimiglia, Republic of Genoa (now Province of Imperia, Liguria, Italy)
- Died: 23 February 1681 (aged 73) Ventimiglia, Republic of Genoa (now Province of Imperia, Liguria, Italy)
- Parent(s): Marco Aprosio and Petronilla Aprosio
- Known for: La Biblioteca Aprosiana (1673)
- Other name: Padre Ventimiglia
- Occupation: Monk, writer, and polymath

Religious life
- Religion: Roman Catholicism
- Order: Order of Saint Augustine
- Ordination: 1622

Angelico Aprosio OSA (born Ludovico Aprosio, 29 October 1607 – 23 February 1681) was an Italian Augustine monk, scholar, and bibliophile.

== Biography ==
Aprosio was born into a wealthy family in Ventimiglia. As a young man he felt called to the religious life and persevered in this early vocation in spite of the desire of his parents to have their only son study law or medicine. He entered the Augustinian order on March 19, 1623, while still but 15 years of age, changing his baptismal name of Ludovico to Angelico, probably from that of an uncle who had been a famous preacher in the Order. He spent the year of his novitiate and two years after his profession in the convent of his Order at Genoa, after which time he sought permission from his superiors to go to Tuscany, and was sent to the Convent of Sant'Agostino in Siena, where he remained six years.

In 1639 he was appointed professor of belles-lettres, at the convent of St. Stephen in Venice, and subsequently Vicar general of the Congregation of Santa Maria della Consolazione in Genoa. He acquired a high reputation by his numerous works on literary criticism and other subjects, among which are a moral essay against the luxury and extravagance of women, entitled "The Shield of Rinaldo," ("Lo Scudo di Rinaldo," 1642,) and "La Grillaia" (1673), a miscellany of literary and antiquarian researches. In his critical writings he defended Giambattista Marino against Tommaso Stigliani, but he also opposed Arcangela Tarabotti in the debate over the oppression of women.

Today Aprosio is best remembered for his "La Biblioteca Aprosiana," (1673) one of the earliest and most comprehensive select bibliographies of Italian literature. The first part of the volume contains his autobiography and the account of his correspondence. The second part is a partial catalogue of the books, arranged under the first names of the donors in alphabetical order. Both parts are replete with biographical and bibliographical notes, many of great length. Johann Christoph Wolf, the compiler of the standard Bibliotheca hebraea (4 vols., Hamburg, 1715 – 33), translated the Biblioteca into Latin (Hamburg, 1734) and provided it with a necessary index containing the names of both donors and authors. Aprosio founded in his native city a library called "Aprosiana", established in 1648 at the Augustinian monastery of Ventimiglia.

The Aprosian Library housed over ten thousand volumes and was officially recognized in 1653 by Pope Innocent X, who issued a ban prohibiting the sale of any of its books and opened it to the public. In the following years, Aprosio dedicated himself to expanding the library, enlarging the monastery to hold its volumes, and compiling its catalogue.

The Aprosian Library was partly dispersed in 1798 upon the arrival of French troops and the suppression of the Augustinian order. Part of the collection ended up in the National Library of Genoa. Today the library hosts a collection of approximately twenty-six thousand volumes about seven thousand of which make up the 'fondo antico' (16th-17th century editions). The library owns almost two hundred incunabula and ancient manuscripts as well as a picture gallery comprising the portrait of Aprosio himself, executed by Carlo Ridolfi in 1647.

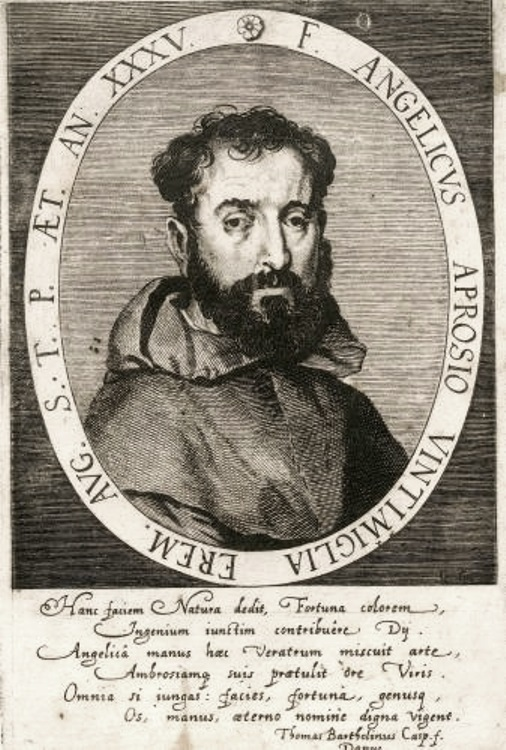
Engraving of Angelico Aprosio from the book "Le glorie degli Incogniti", 1647

Aprosio was a member of several academies and learned societies, including the Incogniti of Venice, the Apatisti of Florence, the Geniali of Codogno, the Ansiosi of Gubbio, the Infecondi of Rome, and the Eterocliti of Pesaro. His contemporaries regarded him as a veritable fount of learning. Raffaele Soprani, who knew him personally, says that he had no equal in his knowledge of authors, ancient and modern; and adds that he himself is much indebted to him for contributions to his own work on the writers of Liguria. He numbered among his correspondents several of the most distinguished men of his time, including Agostino Lampugnani, Fortunio Liceti, Nicolás Antonio, Juan Caramuel, Antoine Godeau, Johann Friedrich Gronovius, Nicolas Steno, Johann Vesling, Caspar Schoppe and the scholar and scientist Thomas Bartholin.

== Works ==
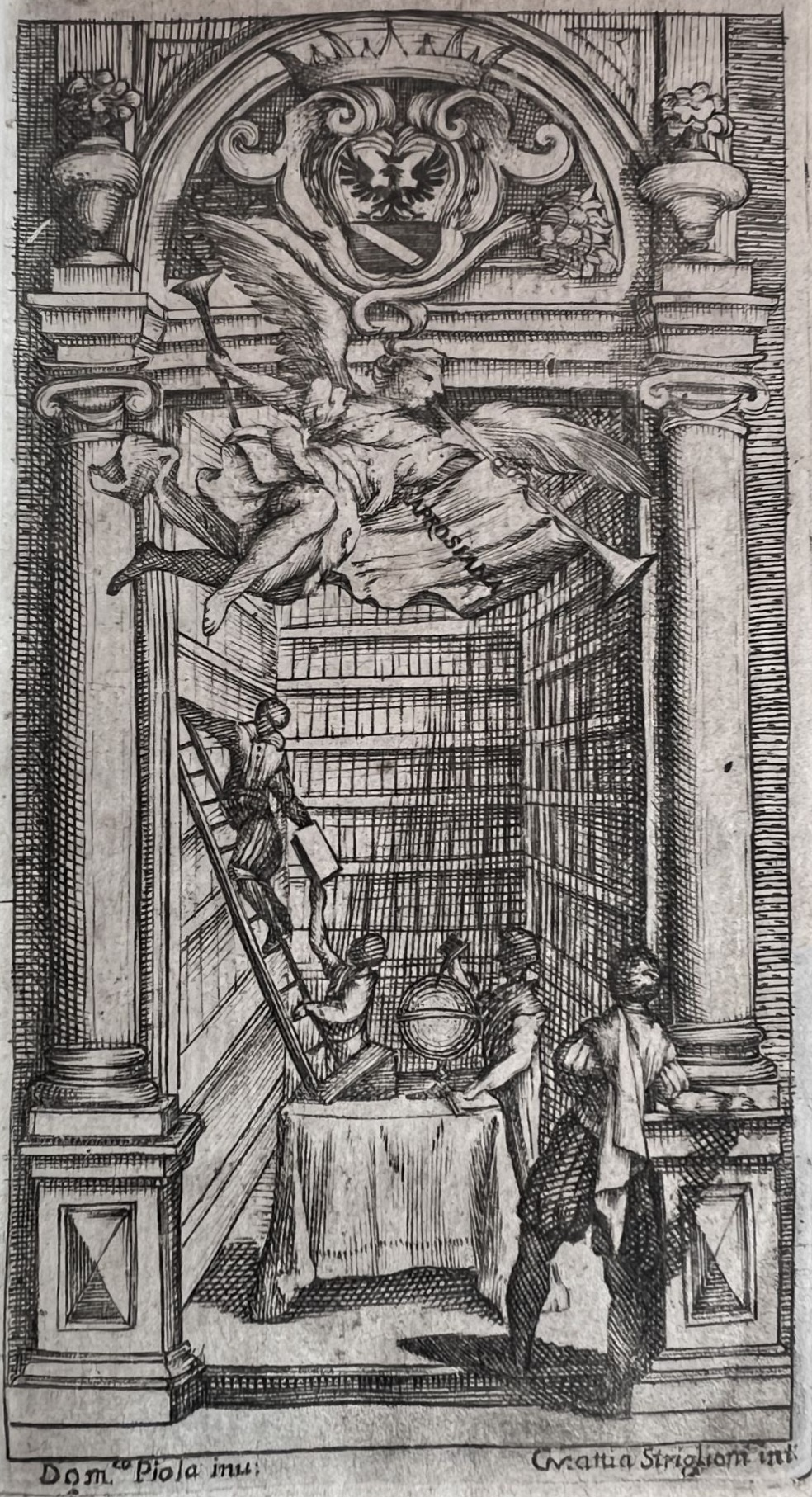
Titlepage of Aprosio's Biblioteca Aprosiana, 1673, engraved by Giovanni Mattia Striglioni after Domenico Piola

- Il Vaglio critico di Masoto Galistoni da Terama sopra il Mondo Nuovo del cav. Tomaso Stigliani da Matera, Rostock, 1637. This is a critique of the first canto of Stigliani's poem, “Il Mondo Nuovo,” and was written in retaliation for his criticism of the “Adone” of Giambattista Marino. The name assumed by Aprosio is an anagram of Stigliani's own name.
- Il Buratto. Replica di Carlo Galistoni al Molino del signor Stigliani, Venezia, 1642.
- L'Occhiale Stritolato di Scipio Glareano, per riposta al signor cavaliere Tomaso Stigliani, Venezia, 1641.
- La Sferza poetica, di Sapricio Saprici, lo scantonato accademico eteroclito. Per riposta alla prima censura dell'Adone del cavaliere Marino, fatta dal cavalier Tomaso Stigliani, Venezia, 1643.
- Del Veratro, apologia di Sapricio Saprici, per riposta alla seconda censura dell'Adone del cavalier Marino, fatta dal cavalier Tomaso Stigliani, parte prima, Venezia, 1645, parte seconda, Venezia, 1647.
- Annotazioni di Oldauro Scioppio all'arte degli amanti dell'ill. signor Pietro Michiele nobile veneto, Venezia, 1642.
- Sermoni di tutte le Domeniche, e Festività de' Santi, che occorrono nell'Avvento del Signore fino alla Purificazione della Vergine, disposti in varie risoluzioni morali, per Opera del P. Agostino Osorio Provinciale ne' Regni della Corona di Aragona, trasportati della Spagnola nell'Italiana favella da Oldauro Scioppio, Venezia, 1643.
- Lo Scudo di Rinaldo, o vero lo specchio del disinganno, opera di Scipio Glareano, Venezia, 1642.
- Le Bellezze della Belisa, tragedia dell'Ill. signor D. Antonio Muscettola, abbozzate da Oldauro Scioppio, Accademico Incognito e Geniale, Lovano, 1664.
- Aprosio, Angelico (1664). Della Patria d'A. Persio Flacco Dissertatione di Lodovico Aprosio Accademico Incognito di Venetia, geniale di Codogno, apatista di Firenze, ed Animoso di Gubbio ... Cavata dal libro primo delle Hore Pomeridiane del medesimo (in Italian). Genova: per Pietro Giouanni Calenzani.
- Le Vigilie del Capricorno, note tumultuarie di Paolo Genari di Scio, Accademico Incognito di Venetia, alle epistole eroiche, poesie dell'eruditissimo signor Lorenzo Crasso, avvocato napolitano, Venezia, 1667.
- Aprosio, Angelico (1668). La Grillaia, curiosità erudite di Scipio Glareano (in Italian). Napoli: per Nouello de Bonis, ad istanzia di Adriano Scultore all'insegna di S. Marco.
- Aprosio, Angelico (1673). La Biblioteca Aprosiana. Passatempo Autunnale di Cornelio Aspasio Antivigilmi trà Vagabondi di Tabbia detto l'Aggirato (in Italian). Bologna: Manolessi. Alphabetically organized by the names of scholars who donated works (often their own) to Angelico Aprosio's library, this compilation of a private library open to scholars amounts to a comprehensive select bio-bibliography of Italian literature. Although Aprosio may not have expected many scholars to visit his library, he clearly wished to interest them in his books, to advertise his collection, and to display his wide acquaintanceship in contemporary Italian literary circles.
- Aprosio, Angelico (1734). Bibliotheca Aprosiana: liber rarissimus, et a nonnullis inter ἀνεκδότους numeratus, jam ex lingua Italica in Latinam conversus. Præmisit præfationem notasque nonnullas addidit I.C. Wolfius (in Latin). Hamburgi: literis Abrami Vandenhoeck.
- La Visieria alzata; Hecatoste di Scrittori che vaghi d'andare in maschera, fuor del tempo di carnavale, sono scoperti da Giovanne Pietro Giacomo Villani, Senese, accademico humorista, infecondo & geniale. Passatempo canicolare inviato all'ill. signor Antonio Magliabechi, Parma, 1689. An early bibliography of pseudonymous authors (perhaps the first), La Visieria alzata was anonymously and posthumously published in 1689 in Parma, per gli Heredi del Vigna, under the editorship of Giovanni Pietro Villani of the Siena Academy. The publication is dedicated to Antonio Magliabecchi (1633–1714), Aprosio's friend, colleague, and fellow bibliomane, under whose influence and encouragement the book is generally thought to have been published and who, not improbably, provided information to Aprosio during its preparation. Vincent Placcius has inserted the work, separated into many parts, in his Theatrum Anonymorum et Pseudonymorum.
- Pentecoste d'altri scrittori, che andando in Maschera fuor del tempo di carnevale, sono scoperti.

== Bibliography ==
- Slawinski, M. (2002). "Aprosio, Angelico". The Oxford Companion to Italian Literature. Oxford University Press.
- Brydges, Egerton (1822). Polyanthea Librorum Vetustiorum, Italicorum, Gallicorum, Hispanicorum. typis G. Fick. pp. 141–145. This article incorporates text from this source, which is in the public domain.
- The Biographical Dictionary of the Society for the Diffusion of Useful Knowledge. Vol. 3. Longman, Brown, Green, and Longmans. 1843. pp. 203–204. This article incorporates text from this source, which is in the public domain.
- Eugenio Mele, Opere del Gracián e d'altri autori spagnuoli fra le mani del P. Casalicchio, in Giornale storico della letteratura italiana, LXXXII (1923), p. 74.
- Roberts, Ethel D. (February 1936). "Book Collector, Italian, Seventeenth Century". The Colophon, A Book Collectors' Quarterly. I. New Series. New York: 428–40.
- Fontana, Antonia Ida (1981). "Rapporti epistolari italiani ed europei di Angelico Aprosio". Il Gran Secolo di Angelico Aprosio. Sanremo: Casino Municipale: 81–94.
- Quinto Marini, Frati barocchi: studi su A.G. Brignole Sale, G.A. De Marini, A. Aprosio, F. F. Frugoni, e P. Segneri, Modena, Mucchi, 2000.
- Bruzzone, Gian Luigi (2004). "Sei lettere di Fortunio Liceti al p. Angelico Aprosio (1646-1653)". Quaderni per la storia dell'università di Padova. 37 (37). Rome: Antenore: 1–9. doi:10.1400/10915.
- Bruzzone, Luigi (2008). "Cinque lettere di Gaspare Scioppio al P. Angelico Aprosio". Filologia e Critica (2). Rome: Salerno: 1–12. doi:10.1400/149826.
- Giovanni Nicolò Cavana (2013). Luca Tosin (ed.). Lettere ad Angelico Aprosio, 1665-1675. Firenze University Press. ISBN 9788866552352.
