= Ottavio Tronsarelli =

Italian poet and librettist (c. 1586 – 1646)

- Born: c. 1586; Rome, Papal States
- Died: 31 August 1646; Rome, Papal States
- Education: Roman College
- Occupations: Poet; Intellectual; Librettist
- Parent(s): Antonio Tronsarelli and Chiara Tronsarelli (née Diaz Radice)
- Writing career
- Language: Italian language
- Period: 17th century; Baroque literature
- Genres: Poetry
- Notable work: La catena d’Adone
- Literary movement: Baroque; Marinism

Ottavio Tronsarelli (c. 1586 – 31 August 1646) was an Italian Baroque poet, librettist and man of letters.

== Biography ==
Ottavio Tronsarelli was born in Rome around 1586 of a wealthy family. His father, Antonio, was a famous art collector. He attended the Roman College, where he studied under Famiano Strada, Bernardino Stefonio and Terenzio Alciati. Tronsarelli was the author of two epic poems, one on the Emperor Constantine the Great, Il Costantino (Rome, 1629), the other on the battle of Lepanto, La Vittoria Navale (Rome, 1633), of more than thirty librettos, and of numerous other pieces in prose and verse. He was a member of the Accademia degli Ordinati of Rome.

Tronsarelli is best remembered for the libretto of Domenico Mazzocchi's La catena d'Adone, based on episodes from Giambattista Marino's epic poem L'Adone (1623). In 1632 he collected and published all his drammi per musica (except for two: La catena d'Adone and Dafne) in a single edition. Tronsarelli contributed a good deal of the text of Giovanni Baglione's Lives of the painters, sculptors, architects, including the 22 Latin distichs that preface the work. He was the author of several antiquarian works, including Le grandezze di Roma, a compilation from the Justus Lipsius' Admiranda, sive de Magnitudine Romana published as a supplement to the Italian translation of Orazio Torsellino's Ristretto dell'historie del mondo. Tronsarelli died in Rome on August 31, 1646. His eulogy was recited by the piarist father Francesco della Nunziata.

== Works ==
- Argomento della Catena d'Adone favola boscareccia. Rome: per Giacomo Mascardi. 1626.
- Favole d'Ottavio Tronsarelli. Rome: per Francesco Corbelletti. 1626.
- Rime di Ottauio Tronsarelli. Rome: per Francesco Corbelletti. 1627.
- II Costantino. Rome: per Francesco Corbelletti. 1629.
- Drammi musicali di Ottauio Tronsarelli. Rome: per Francesco Corbelletti. 1632.
- La gara delle tre dee. Rome: per Francesco Corbelletti. 1632.
- La vittoria navale. Rome: per Francesco Corbelletti. 1633.
- L'Apollo. Rome: per Francesco Corbelletti. 1634.
- "Le grandezze dell'imperio romano cavate da Giusto Lipsio e da altri autori". Ristretto dell'historie del mondo del P. Torsellino della Compag.a del Gesù. Rome: ad istanza di Pompilio Totti. 1634.
- Il martirio de' santi Abundio prete, Abundantio diacono, Marciano e Giovanni suo figliuolo cavalieri romani. Rome: appresso Lodouico Grignani. 1641.

== Bibliography ==
- Morelli, Arnaldo (2020). "TRONSARELLI, Ottavio". Dizionario Biografico degli Italiani (in Italian). Vol. 97: Trivulzio–Valeri. Rome: Istituto dell'Enciclopedia Italiana. ISBN 978-88-12-00032-6.
- Hutton, James (1935). The Greek Anthology in Italy to the Year 1800. Ithaca: Cornell University Press. pp. 260–261.
- Santacroce, Simona (2014). ""La ragion perde dove il senso abonda": "La Catena d'Adone" di Ottavio Tronsarelli". Studi Secenteschi. LV: 135–153.
- Gigliucci, Roberto (2015). "Tronsarelli e la Catena d'Adone fra morte di Marino e messa all'indice del poema". Studi (E testi) italiani: Semestrale del Dipartimento di Italianistica e Spettacolo. 36 (2). Rome: Bulzoni: 45–54. doi:10.1400/249872.
- Terzaghi, M.C. (2017). "L'accademico Ottavio Tronsarelli e il suo contributo alle Vite di Giovanni Baglione". Intrecci Virtuosi. Letterati, Artisti e Accademie Tra Cinque e Seicento. Rome: De Luca Editore: 213–227. ISBN 978-8865573211.
