= Giovanni Pozzi =

Swiss-Italian monk and writer

Giovanni Pozzi (20 June 1923 – 20 July 2002) was a Swiss-Italian monk, essayist and literary critic. He was particularly interested in the messages in the words and images of the Baroque mystics.

== Life ==
He was born in Locarno to Ettore Pozzi and Maria Rosa Patocchi and was baptised 'Paolo'. He entered the Capuchin monastery in Faido aged eleven, followed by studies in Cesena, where he took vows under the name 'Giovanni' and where he was ordained priest in 1948. From 1948 to 1954 he continued his studies at the University of Freiburg under Gianfranco Contini and Giuseppe Billanovich. From 1960 to 1988 he taught Italian literature at that university.

In 1964 he published the monumental edition of 1499 Hypnerotomachia Poliphili by Francesco Colonna, published by Studio Bibliografico Antenore (then Editrice Antenore) in Padua. Perhaps Pozzi's most significant editorial undertaking is perhaps that linked to the publication of the richly annotated critical text of L'Adone by Giovan Battista Marino (1976, 2nd ed. 1988). He died in Lugano.

== Main works ==
- Saggio sull'oratoria sacra nel Seicento esemplificato sul padre Emmanuele Orchi, Istituto di studi francescani, 1954.
- Dicerie sacre e Strage degl'innocenti. di Giambattista Marino, Einaudi, Torino 1960.
- Hypnerotomachia Poliphili, di Francesco Colonna, edizione critica in collaborazione con L. A. Ciapponi, 1964.
- Castigationes Plinianae et in Pomponium Melam, di Ermolao Barbaro, edizione critica, 1973-1979.
- La rosa in mano al professore, 1974.
- Adone, edizione critica, Mondadori 1976.
- La parola dipinta (a collection of poems for the eye before the ear, from the Alexandrian and medieval 'technopenoi' to the 'calligrammes' of Guillaume Apollinaire), Adelphi, Milano, 1981.
- Come pregava la gente, Archivio Storico Ticinese, 1983.
- Temi, topoi, stereotipi, saggio, in Letteratura italiana, Einaudi, 1984.
- Poesia per gioco. Prontuario di figure artificiose, 1984.
- Le parole dell'estasi, 1984.
- Rose e gigli per Maria: un'antifona dipinta, 1987.
- Il parere autobiografico di Veronica Giuliani, 1987.
- Adone, edizione rivista, Adelphi, 1988.
- Scrittrici mistiche italiane, (in collaborazione con Claudio Leonardi), 1988.
- Des fleurs dans la poésie italienne, 1989.
- Il libro dell'esperienza della Beata Angela da Foligno, 1992.
- Sull'orlo del visibile parlare, Milano, Adelphi, 1993.
- Alternatim, Adelphi, 1996.
- Grammatica e retorica dei santi, Milano, Vita e Pensiero, 1997.
- Tacet, Adelphi, 2002.
- In forma di parola, Milano, Medusa Edizioni, 2003.

== Prizes ==
- International «Galileo Galilei» prize of the Rotary Italiani for the history of Italian literature, 1992.
- Premio Viareggio-Repaci, 1996 for Alternatim.
- Premio Chiara for lifetime achievement, 1998.
- Prize for the centenary of the BSI SA, 2000.

== Bibliography (in Italian) ==
- Giovanni Orelli, Svizzera italiana, Editrice La Scuola, Brescia 1986, 28, 29, 34, 42, 43, 44, 49, 68, 160, 207-212, 221.
- Ottavio Besomi et alii (a cura di), Forme e vicende. Per Giovanni Pozzi, Padova, Editrice Antenore, 1988 (con elenco delle opere).
- Dante Isella, Per Giovanni Pozzi, 2001.
- Ottavio Besomi, Giovanni Pozzi, in «Archivio Storico Ticinese», 133, Edizioni Casagrande, Bellinzona 2003, pp. 161–194.

== External links (in Italian) ==
- "Pozzi ricordato da Rodoni".
- "Ricordo di padre Giovanni Pozzi".
- "Hypnerotomachia Poliphili on-line".
