= Biblioteca Aprosiana =

Italian library

Coordinates: 43°47′28″N 7°36′39″E

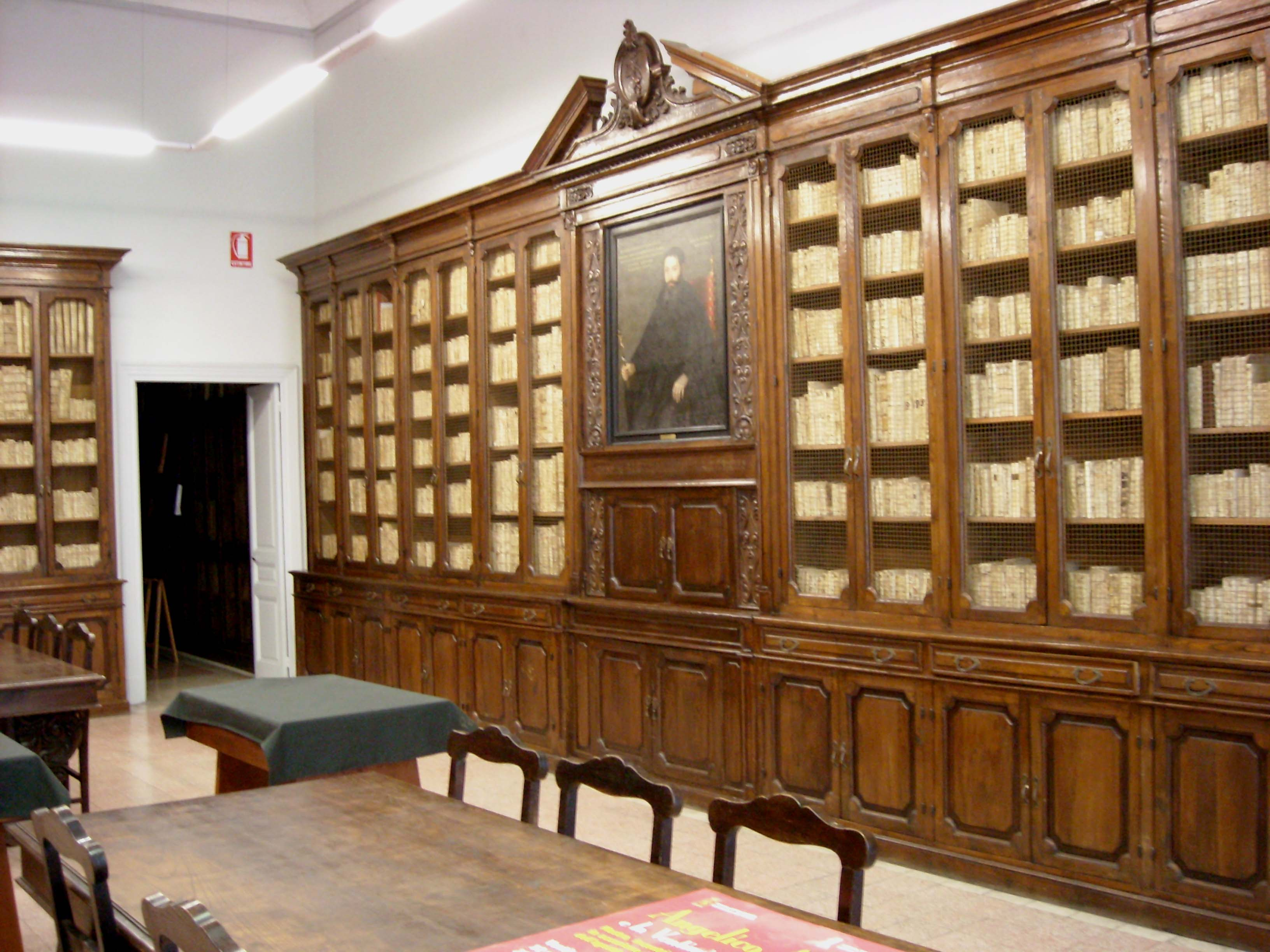
- A Hall of the Biblioteca Aprosiana
- Location: Via Garibaldi, 10, Ventimiglia, Italy
- Type: Public library
- Established: 1648; 378 years ago

Collection
- Size: >26,000 printed items and manuscripts

Other information
- Director: Ruggero Marro

The Biblioteca Aprosiana is the civic library of the city of Ventimiglia, Italy. It was the first public library to be opened in Liguria and one of the oldest in Italy. Founded in 1648 by the scholar and bibliophile Angelico Aprosio, it was initially based in the convent of the Augustinians of Ventimiglia, to whose order Aprosio himself belonged.

== History ==
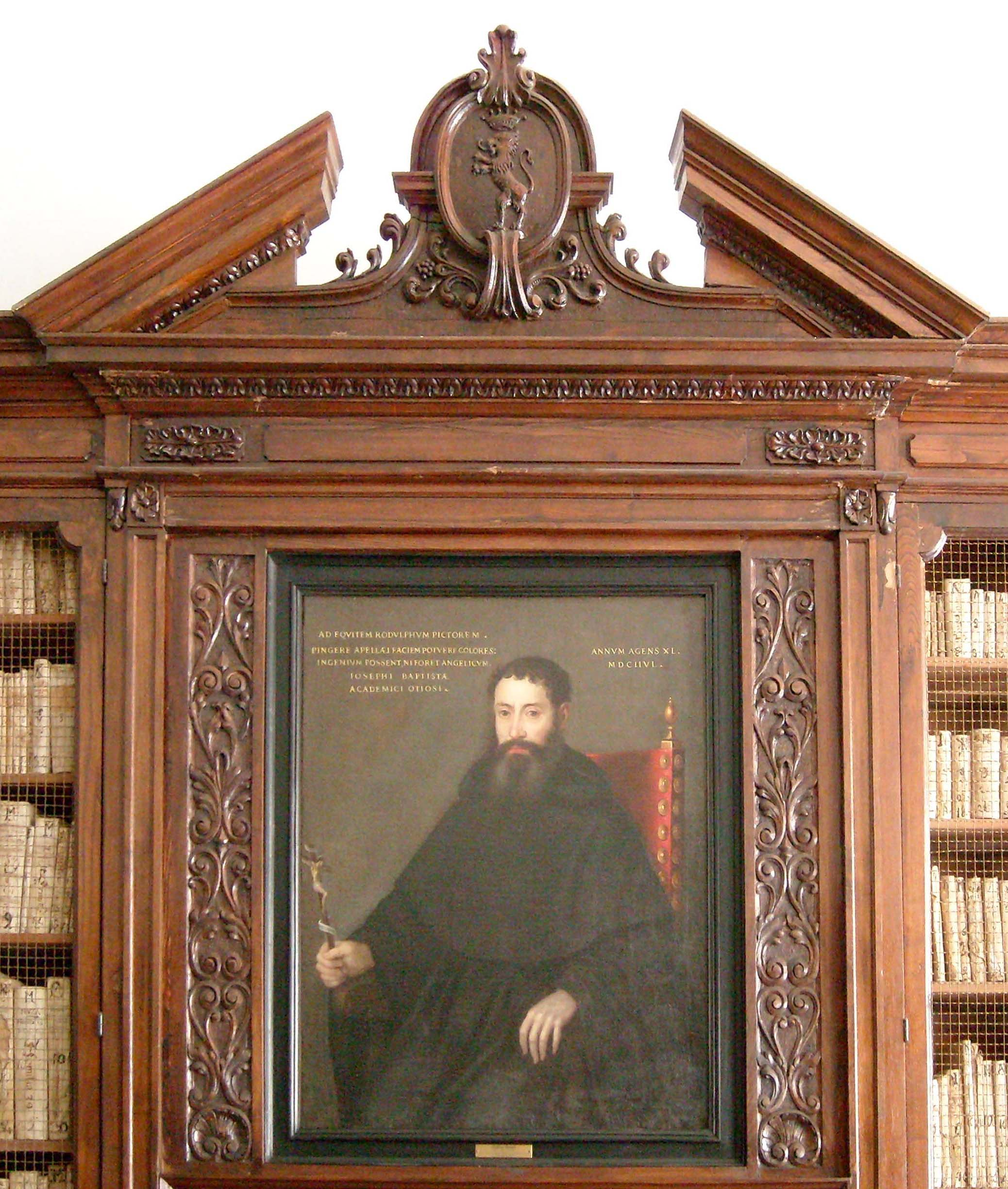
Portrait of Angelico Aprosio by Carlo Ridolfi

A renowned scholar and an avid collector, Angelico Aprosio gathered a huge amount of printed and manuscript books during his lifetime. Raffaele Soprani, in his Scrittori della Liguria of 1667, says that his library comprised over five thousand volumes, but Aprosio himself in his Biblioteca published in 1673 speaks of there being ten or twelve thousand.

Indeed he was often in need of room for his growing collection, even after a place had been provided for it. His difficulties in securing a place were many and disheartening. "We have had a bad harvest of grapes," he writes in one letter, "but I have made a good harvest of books, for they have come to me from every side. It really is a favor which God bestows upon me and a confusion to those malignant persons who have been trying to impede the good work which I have been carrying on to His honor and glory."

Aprosio had at first intended to give his books to form a library at the convent of his Order at Genoa, but having been persuaded to present them to the convent at Ventimiglia, he desired to have a recently constructed part of the building remodeled for his use. Much to his dissatisfaction, he was given certain rooms in the older part of the building. He was soon after obliged to leave Ventimiglia and when he returned in 1654 with more books he found the rooms assigned to the library entirely inadequate. A new wing was begun for it, but a jealous monk complained to the General of the Order that it was spoiling the architectural beauty of the convent. Fortunately the General, arriving in the course of his duties to visit Ventimiglia, learned the true state of affairs and the work proceeded. But Padre Aprosio's troubles were not over. The monk carried his complaint to Rome; but through the good offices of Leo Allatius, who was thus enabled in some measure to return the many favors he had received from his friend, the case was finally decided in the latter's favor. Other friends, including the Bishop of his diocese, aided him in building and furnishing the library and in providing him with the large collection of portraits of eminent men of the century which were hung in the corridor leading to it.

Meanwhile by his influence a Genoese patrician had left a rich bequest of books to the convent at Genoa, and Aprosio wished to obtain a papal brief which would effectually prevent the removal of books from either library. This he received from Pope Innocent X under date of January 3, 1653. The brief threatened with excommunication anyone who traded or otherwise removed books from it.

During the Seven Years' War, the Augustinian convent of Ventimiglia suffered serious damage and looting. At the end of the 1790s the Napoleonic invasion caused the loss of part of the bibliographic heritage, which was sold to some important Ligurian families (including the Durazzo family) or merged into various Genoese libraries.

At the beginning of the nineteenth century, the library came to be administered by the Municipality of Ventimiglia, which transferred all the surviving material it contained to various buildings in the upper city: first to the Church of San Francesco, then to an adjacent building, and finally, following of the earthquake of 1887 and thanks to the active contribution of Thomas Hanbury, in the then Civico Teatro (also known as the "Lascaris Theatre").

== Current consistency ==
Currently, thanks also to the work carried out in recent decades by some particularly active and capable librarians, the library hosts a collection of approximately twenty-six thousand volumes, of which over seven thousand belong to the so-called Ancient Fund. To these must be added almost two hundred incunabula and manuscripts, some of them of exceptional historical value (among which special mention should be made of a variant, unique in its kind, of the Obras by Luis de Góngora and a rare edition of Fernando de Rojas' La Celestina, printed in Paris in 1527), as well as a picture gallery of around ten portraits (among which that of Aprosio himself, executed by Carlo Ridolfi in 1647).

== Bibliography ==
- Roberts, Ethel D. "Book Collector, Italian, Seventeenth Century". The Colophon, A Book Collectors' Quarterly, New Series, Vol. I. New York, February, 1936: 428–40.
- Una biblioteca pubblica del Seicento l'Aprosiana di Ventimiglia. Mostra di alcune edizioni rare del Fondo aprosiano, 26 settembre-11 ottobre 1981. Città di Ventimiglia, Civica biblioteca aprosiana. 1981.
- Il gran secolo di Angelico Aprosio. Atti delle conversazioni aprosiane (29 agosto-29 ottobre 1981). Sanremo, Casino Municipale, 1981.
- M. Damonte; A.M. Mignone, eds. (1984). Fondo antico spagnolo della Biblioteca Aprosiana di Ventimiglia. Pisa: Giardini.
