= La catena d'Adone =

Opera by Domenico Mazzocchi

La catena d'Adone (The Chain of Adonis) is the only surviving opera by the Italian composer Domenico Mazzocchi. It was commissioned by Cardinal Ippolito Aldobrandini and first performed at the Palazzo Conti, Rome on February 12, 1626. The libretto, in a prologue and five acts, is by Ottavio Tronsarelli and is based on episodes from Giambattista Marino's epic poem Adone (1623).

== Historical importance ==
La catena d'Adone was an important step in the development of Roman opera. The demarcation between recitative and aria grew more distinct in this work as Mazzocchi tried to escape what he called the "monotony" of Florentine opera.

== Roles ==
The prologue includes Apollo (tenor) and cyclopes. The opera itself has roles for the enchantress Falsirena (soprano); Adone (alto); Plutone (bass); Venere (soprano); Idonia (soprano) and Arsete (bass), advisers of Falsirena; Oraspe (tenor); Amore (soprano); Eco (alto); nymphs and shepherds. At the premiere, Adone was sung by the 'artificial' contralto (i.e. countertenor) Lorenzo Sances. Falsirena was sung by the composer and castrato Loreto Vittori.

== Synopsis ==
In the prologue, Apollo descends from the clouds and laments Venere's desertion of her husband, the god Vulcan, for the young Adone. In the opera proper (drawn from Cantos XII and XIII of Marino's poem), Adone has to flee from Venere's former lover, the god Marte, and takes refuge in the land of the enchantress Falsirena, who falls in love with him. Falsirena keeps him captive in her realm by means of a magic, invisible chain. She asks Plutone to find out who Adone's love is, then pretends to be Venere. But the real goddess arrives, frees Adone and binds Falsirena to a rock with her own chain.

== Recordings ==
- La catena d'Adone, Reinoud Van Mechelen (Adone), Luciana Mancini (Falsirena), Merel Elishevah Kriegsman (Venere/Ninfa), Catherine Lybaert (Amore/Ninfa), Scherzi Musicali conducted by Nicolas Achten (2 CDs, Alpha, 2010)

== Sources ==
- A Short History of Opera by Donald Jay Grout (Columbia University Press, 2003 ed.)
- Marina Vaccarini, Catena d'Adone, La, in Gelli, Piero & Poletti Filippo eds. (2007). Dizionario dell'Opera 2008, Milan: Baldini Castoldi Dalai, pp. 208–209. ISBN 978-88-6073-184-5 (in Italian; reproduced online at Opera Manager or Del Teatro
- Magazine de l'opéra baroque (in French)
