= Christian Hoffmann von Hoffmannswaldau =

German poet (1616–1679)

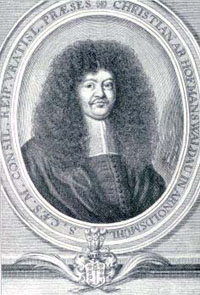
- Born: Wrocław
- Died: 18 April 1679; Wrocław
- Occupation: Poet, writer, translator

Christian Hoffmann von Hoffmannswaldau (baptised 25 December 1616 – 4 April 1679) was a German poet of the Baroque era.

He was born and died in Breslau (Wrocław) in Silesia. During his education in Danzig (Gdańsk) and Leiden, he befriended Martin Opitz and Andreas Gryphius, both leading figures in 17th-century German poetry. In his later years, Hofmannswaldau involved himself in the city politics of Breslau, rising to the position of Bürgermeister.

During his lifetime, Hofmannswaldau's poems circulated mostly in manuscript. It was the posthumous publication of Deutsche Übersetzungen und Gedichte in 1679 that assured his reputation as the most influential poet of his era, followed by Benjamin Neukirch's even more extensive collection, Herrn von Hoffmannswaldau und anderer Deutschen auserlesener und bißher ungedruckter Gedichte, the first volume of which appeared in 1695. Hofmannswaldau's style of poetry came to be known as galant poetry and is marked by extravagant metaphors, skillful use of rhetoric and unashamed eroticism. It shows the influence of the Italian poet Giambattista Marino. Hofmannswaldau's verse enjoyed great popularity until it was attacked for bad taste by Johann Christoph Gottsched in the mid-18th century.

== Sources ==
- Gedichte des Barock, ed. Ulrich Maché and Volker Meid (Reclam, 1980)
