= Domenico Mazzocchi =

Italian Baroque composer

Domenico Mazzocchi (baptised 8 November 1592 in Civita Castellana – 21 January 1665 in Veja) (Note: Veja is possibly an older name for present-day Vejano.) was an Italian Baroque composer of vocal music, of the generation after Claudio Monteverdi.

He was a Roman lawyer, studied music with Giovanni Bernardino Nanino (or Nanini), also in Rome, and entered the service of cardinal Ippolito Aldobrandini in 1621.

He is associated with providing music for the popes, particularly Cardinal Maffeo Barberini, later Pope Urban VIII, until Mazzocchi's death in Rome on 21 January 1665.

His younger brother, Virgilio Mazzocchi, was a less notable composer and had a similar career as a Vatican music provider.

== Works ==
=== Operas ===
- La catena d'Adone (1626)
- L'innocenza difesa

=== Other ===
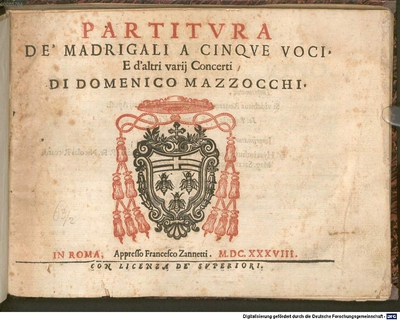
Madrigali a 5 voci in partitura (1638)

- Madrigali a 5 voci in partitura (1638), madrigals which have Basso continuo, similar to the late Monteverdi; these contain the first notations, as explained in the preface, of the persisting conventional musical symbols < 'crescendo', > 'decrescendo', p(iano), f(orte) and tr(illo)
- Oratorio
  - David
  - Maddalena
- church music, notably motets
