= Tommaso Stigliani =

Italian poet, literary critic, and writer

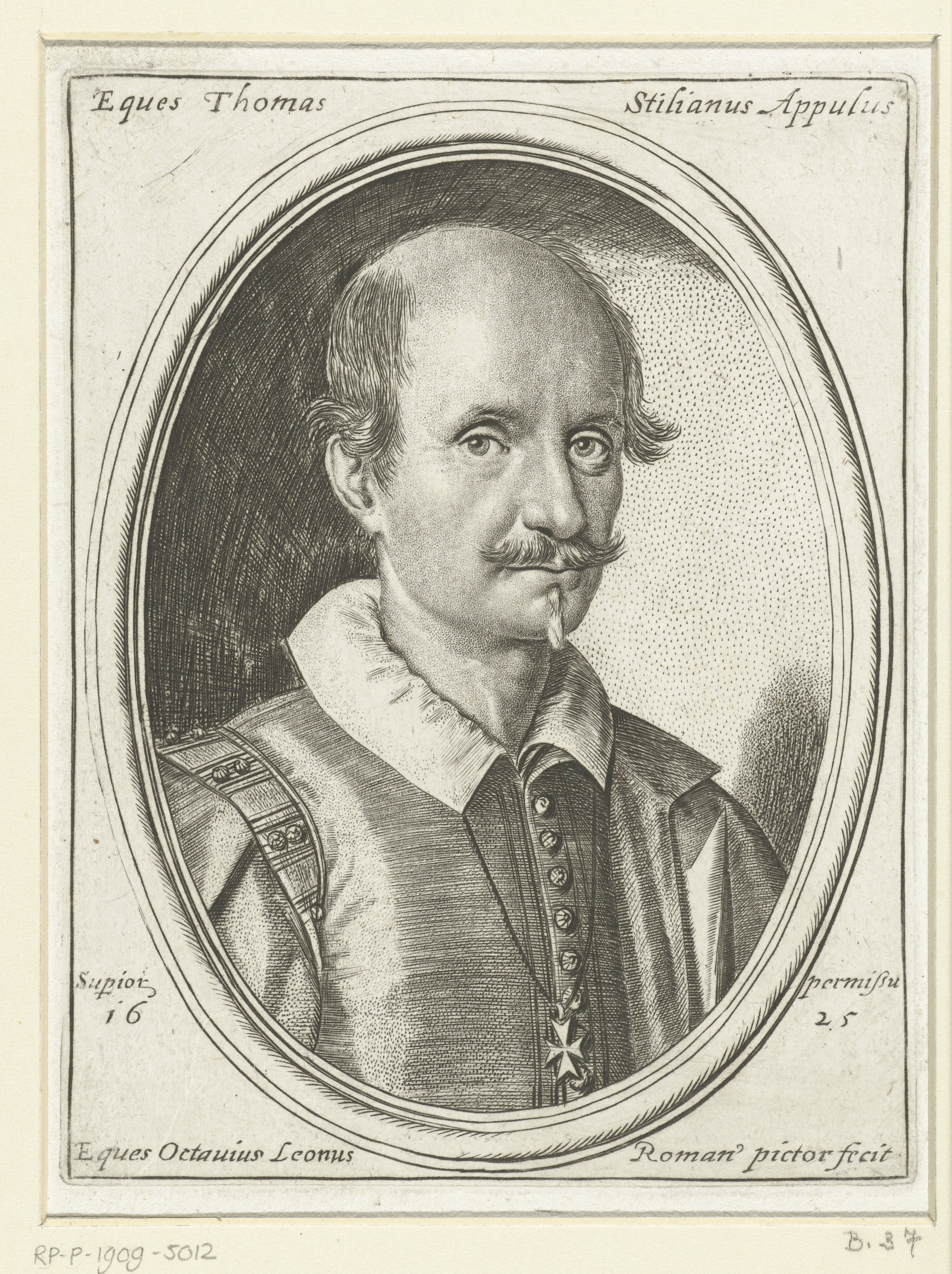
- Tommaso Stigliani
- Born: 28 June 1573; Matera, Kingdom of Naples
- Died: 27 January 1651 (aged 77); Rome, Papal States
- Education: University of Naples Federico II
- Occupations: Poet; Literary critic; Writer
- Parent(s): Giovan Domenico Stigliani and Geronima Stigliani (née d’Adamo)
- Writing career
- Language: Italian
- Notable works: Il mondo nuovo Dello occhiale
- Literary movement: Baroque; Petrarchism

Tommaso Stigliani (Italian: [tomˈmaːzo stiʎˈʎaːni]; 28 June 1573 – 27 January 1651) was an Italian poet, literary critic, and writer, best known for his enmity with Giambattista Marino.

== Biography ==
He was born in Matera, and educated in Naples where he met with the poets Torquato Tasso and Giambattista Marino. At first a friend of Marino, he later became his bitter enemy and indulged in literary and personal polemics with him. Especially in Dello occhiale (Venice: Carempello, Sandro Bazacchi, 1627), Stigliani laments Marino's many “failures” in the poem Adone. Marino refused, Stigliani indignantly points out, to follow Aristotle's unities, ignoring the need for a proper beginning, middle, and an end. The poem is overwhelmed by superfluities, enthusiasms, and disproportion. In chapter 6, Stigliani regrets the way Marino “stumbles” through the episodes of Adonis and Venus. And so on, for more than 500 pages (there are tables at the end that list all of Marino's “errors”).

Stigliani's contentious personality led him initially to seek employment in various courts of Northern Italy, including Parma, where he was employed by the Duke. He ultimately had to remove himself to Rome, where he published a volume of his works, mainly romantic sonnets, in Canzoniero dato in luce da Balducci (1625, Rome). The Canzoniero reveals Baroque tendencies restrained by a sense of literary discipline deriving from Petrarch and the classics.

In 1617 Stigliani published in Piacenza Il Mondo Nuovo, an epic poem about the discovery of America owing a good deal to the Italian Romance tradition. In his depiction, Stigliani merges a detailed description of America with characters and situations that are closer to the realities of life in seventeenth-century Europe, creating a bridge between the two continents. Stigliani's America is an allegory of the old world and the poet used it to construct a critique of the society of the day. The description of the newt that lives in the Rio de la Plata is a way to make fun of his archenemy Giambattista Marino; the execution of the amazons in the poem is a criticism of the behavior of his patron Ranuccio Farnese; the mad people of the island of Brandana mirror the behavior of all the princes and courtiers who occupy every European Renaissance court. And since it is a poem, the shrewd poet can always defend himself by saying that the Mondo nuovo is, in part, a fictional work. According to Stigliani, the new world with all its faults such as cannibalism and the freedom of sexual mores is, despite everything, better than the corruption and flaws which he finds in his contemporary Europe.

Thanks to his friendship with Galileo supporter Virginio Cesarini, Stigliani was given the task of editing Galileo's Saggiatore (The Assayer) (1623). Stigliani died in Rome on 27 January 1651. After his death, his manuscripts were purchased by cardinal Sforza Pallavicino, an admirer of Stigliani and an opponent of Marinism. His letters were published posthumously in 1661.

== Works ==
- Stigliani, Tommaso (1600). Il Polifemo. Milano: nella stampa del q. Pacifico Pontio impressore archiepiscopale.
- ————— (1617). Il mondo nuovo (1 ed.). Piacenza: per Alessandro Bazacchi.
- ————— (1628). Il mondo nuovo (2 ed.). Roma: Appresso Giacomo Mascardi.
- ————— (1623). Il canzoniero del signor caualier fra' Tomaso Stigliani. Roma: per l'erede di Bartolomeo Zannetti.
- ————— (1627). Dello occhiale opera difensiua del caualier fr. Tomaso Stigliani. Scritta in risposta al caualier Gio. Battista Marini. Dedicato all'eccellentiss. sig. conte D'Oliuares. Venezia: appresso Pietro Carampello.
- ————— (1651). Lettere del caualiere fra Tomaso Stigliani dedicate al sig. prencipe di Gallicano. Roma: per Domenico Manelfi.

== Sources ==
- Hester, Nathalie (2012). "Failed New World Epics in Baroque Italy". Poesis and Modernity in the Old and New Worlds. Vanderbilt University Press. pp. 201–23. doi:10.2307/j.ctv16758g3.13. ISBN 9780826518347.
- Slawinski, M. (2002). "Stigliani, Tommaso". The Oxford Companion to Italian Literature. Oxford University Press. ISBN 978-0-19-818332-7.
