= Giambattista Marino =

Italian poet (1569–1625)

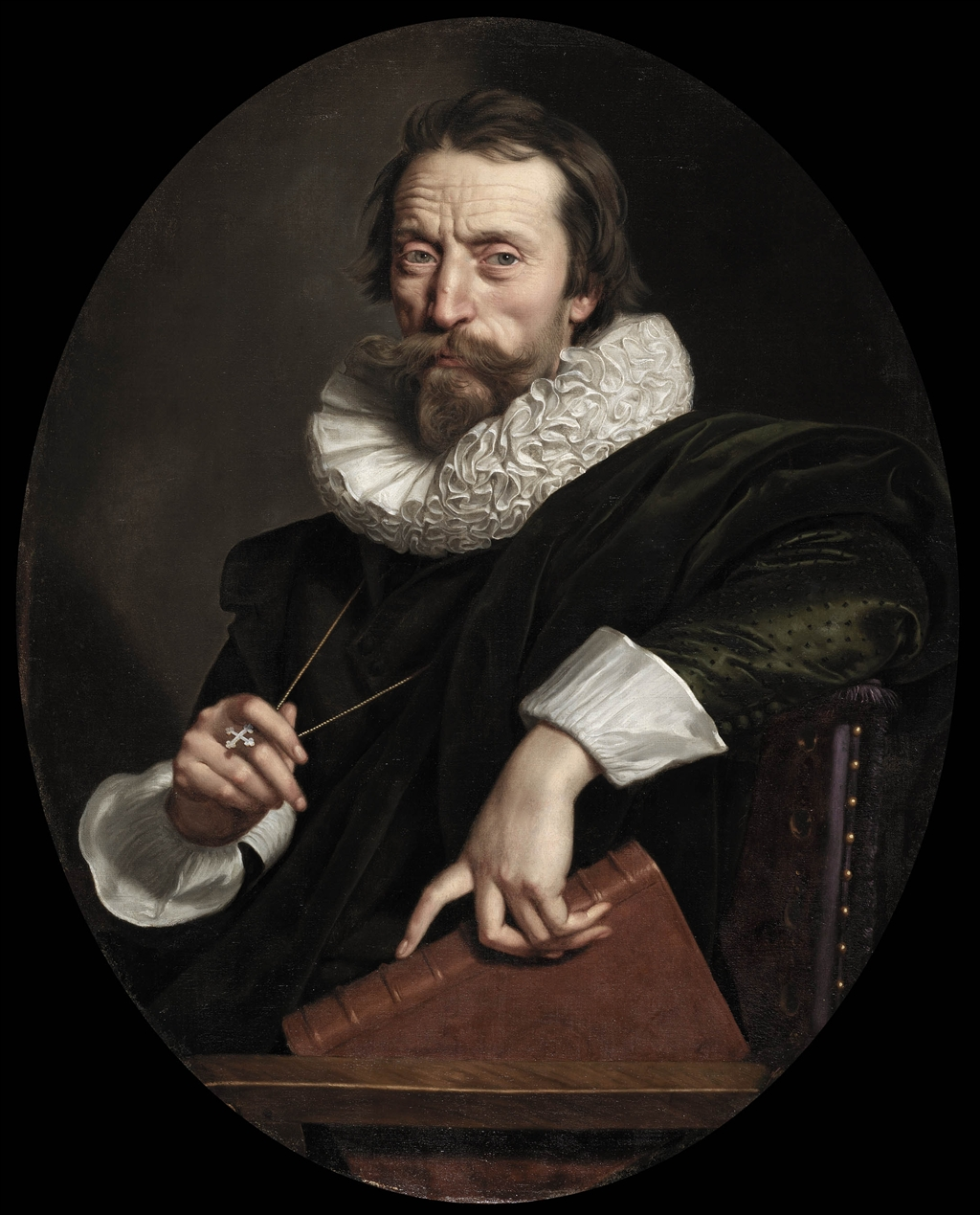
- Portrait of Giovanni Battista Marino, c. 1621. Oil on canvas, 81.0 x 65.7 cm. Detroit, Detroit Institute of Arts
- Born: October 14, 1569; Naples, Kingdom of Naples
- Died: March 26, 1625 (aged 55); Naples, Kingdom of Naples
- Occupation: Poet
- Writing career
- Language: Italian
- Period: from 1602
- Notable works: La Lira; L'Adone
- Movements: Baroque, Marinism

Giambattista Marino (also Giovan Battista Marini) (14 October 1569 – 26 March 1625) was an Italian poet who was born in Naples. He is most famous for his epic L'Adone.

The Cambridge History of Italian Literature thought him to be "one of the greatest Italian poets of all time". He is considered the founder of the school of Marinism, later known as Secentismo (17th century) or Marinismo (19th century), characterised by its use of extravagant and excessive conceits. Marino's conception of poetry, which exaggerated the artificiality of Mannerism, was based on an extensive use of antithesis and a whole range of wordplay, on lavish descriptions and a sensuous musicality of the verse, and enjoyed immense success in his time, comparable to that of Petrarch before him.

He was widely imitated in Italy, France (where he was the idol of members of the précieux school, such as Georges Scudéry, and the so-called libertins such as Tristan l'Hermite), Spain (where his greatest admirer was Lope de Vega) and other Catholic countries, including Portugal and Poland, as well as Germany, where his closest follower was Christian Hoffmann von Hoffmannswaldau and Holland where Constantijn Huygens was a great admirer. In England, he was admired by John Milton and translated by Richard Crashaw.

He remained the reference point for Baroque poetry as long as it was in vogue. In the 18th and 19th centuries, while being remembered for historical reasons, he was regarded as the source and exemplar of Baroque "bad taste". With the 20th-century renaissance of interest in similar poetic procedures, his work has been reevaluated: it was closely read by Benedetto Croce and Carlo Calcaterra and has had numerous important interpreters, including Giovanni Pozzi, Marziano Guglielminetti, Marzio Pieri and Alessandro Martini.

== Life ==
Marino remained in his birthplace Naples until 1600, leading a life of pleasure after breaking off relations with his father, who wanted his son to follow a career in law. These formative years in Naples were very important for the development of his poetry, even though most of his career took place in the north of Italy and France. Regarding this subject, some critics (including Giovanni Pozzi) have stressed the great influence on him exerted by northern Italian cultural circles; others (such as Marzio Pieri) have emphasised the fact that the Naples of the time, though partly in decline and oppressed by Spanish rule, was far from having lost its eminent position among the capitals of Europe.

Marino's father was a highly cultured lawyer, from a family probably of Calabrian origin, who frequented the coterie of Giambattista Della Porta. It seems that both Marino and his father took part in private theatrical performances of their host's plays at the house of the Della Porta brothers.

But more importantly, these surroundings put Marino in direct contact with the natural philosophy of Della Porta and the philosophical systems of Giordano Bruno and Tommaso Campanella. While Campanella himself was to oppose "Marinism" (though not attacking it directly), this common speculative background should be borne in mind with its important pantheistic (and thus neo-pagan and heterodox) implications, to which Marino would remain true all his life and exploit in his poetry, obtaining great success amongst some of the most conformist thinkers on the one hand while encountering continual difficulties because of the intellectual content of his work on the other.

Other figures who were particularly influential on the young Marino include Camillo Pellegrini, who had been a friend of Torquato Tasso (Marino knew Tasso personally, if only briefly, at the house of Giovanni Battista Manso and exchanged sonnets with him). Pellegrini was the author of Il Carrafa overo della epica poesia, a dialogue in honour of Tasso, in which the latter was rated above Ludovico Ariosto. Marino himself is the protagonist of another of the prelate's dialogues, Del concetto poetico (1599).

Marino gave himself up to literary studies, love affairs and a life of pleasure so unbridled that he was arrested at least twice. In this as in many other ways, the path he took resembles that of another great poet of the same era with whom he was often compared, Gabriello Chiabrera.

But an air of mystery surrounds Marino's life, especially the various times he spent in prison; one of the arrests was due to procuring an abortion for a certain Antonella Testa, daughter of the mayor of Naples, but whether she was pregnant by Marino or one of his friends is unknown; the second conviction (for which he risked a capital sentence) was due to the poet's forging episcopal bulls in order to save a friend who had been involved in a duel.

But some witnesses, who include both Marino's detractors (such as Tommaso Stigliani) and defenders (such as the printer and biographer Antonio Bulifoni in a life of the poet which appeared in 1699), have firmly asserted that Marino, much of whose love poetry is heavily ambiguous, had homosexual tendencies. Elsewhere, the reticence of the sources on this subject is obviously due to the persecutions to which "sodomitical practices" were particularly subject during the Counterreformation.

Marino then fled Naples and moved to Rome, first joining the service of Melchiore Crescenzio, then that of Cardinal Aldobrandini. In 1608, he moved to the court of Duke Carlo Emanuele I in Turin. This was not an easy time for the poet; in fact, he was the victim of an assassination attempt by his rival Gaspare Murtola. He was later sentenced to a year in prison, probably for malicious gossip he had written about the duke.

In 1615, he left Turin and moved to Paris, where he remained until 1623, honoured by the court and admired by French literary circles. He returned to Italy in triumph and died in Naples in 1625.

== Works ==
Marino wrote a large amount, both in prose and verse. His poetry remains the most admired and imitated part of his work.

=== Poetry ===
==== Le Rime (1602) and La lira (1614) ====
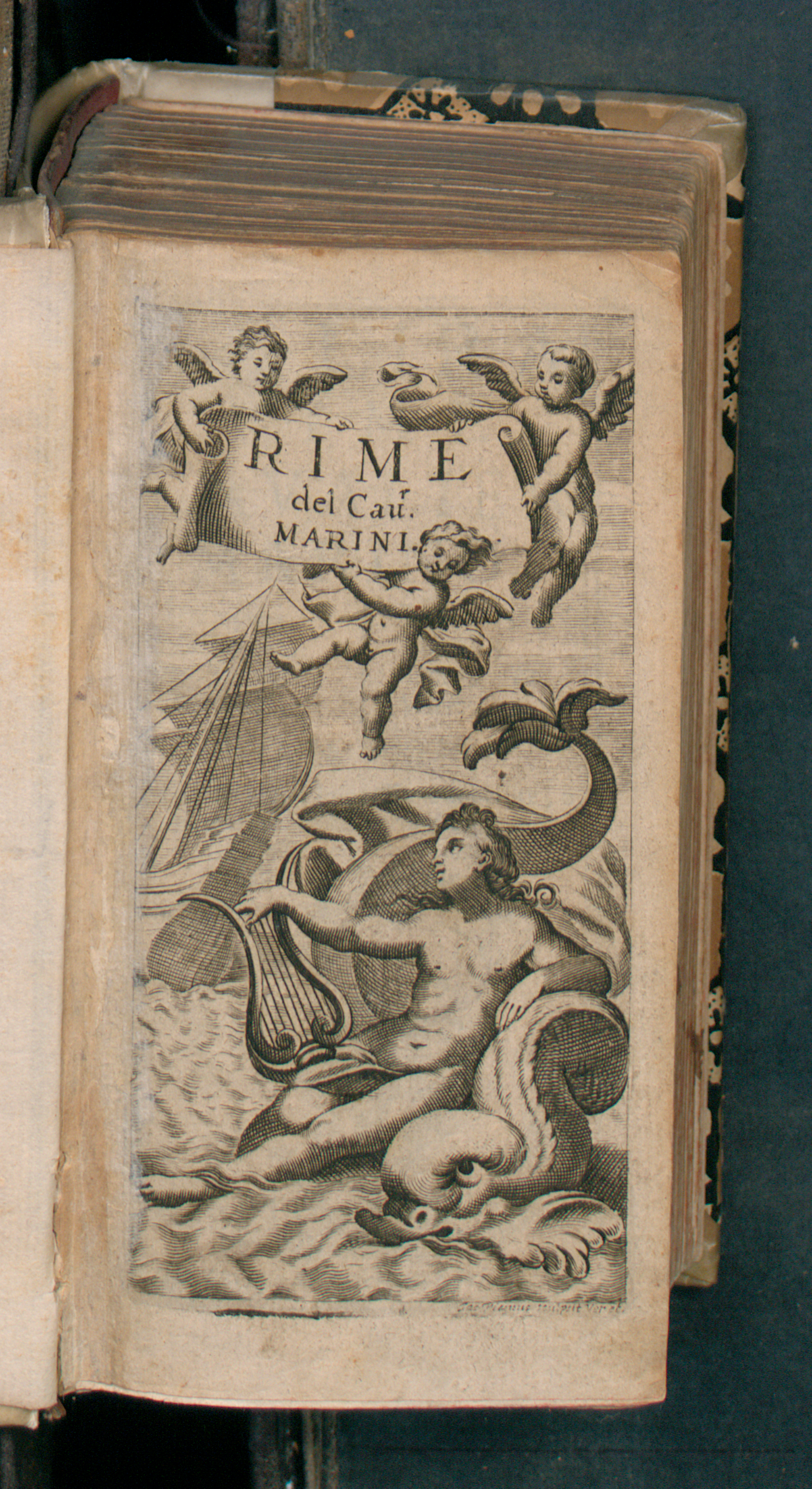
Rime del cav. Marini (1674)

Marino originated a new, "soft, graceful and attractive" style for a new public, distancing himself from Torquato Tasso and Renaissance Petrarchism as well as any kind of Aristotelian rule.

His new approach can be seen in the Rime of 1602, later expanded under the title La lira (The Lyre) in 1614, which is made up of erotic verse, encomiastic and sacred pieces, arranged either by theme (sea poems, rustic poems, love poems, funereal poems, religious poems) or by verse form (madrigal, canzone).

They often hark back to the Classical traditions of Latin and Greek literature, with a particular fondness for the love poems of Ovid and the Dolce stil nuovo tradition of Italian verse, showing a strong experimental tension with anti-Petrachan tendencies.

In 1620, Marino published La Sampogna, a collection of poems divided into two parts: one consisting of pastoral idylls and another of "rustic" verse. Thus, Marino distanced himself from love, heroic and sacred themes in favour of the mythological and bucolic.

==== L'Adone ====
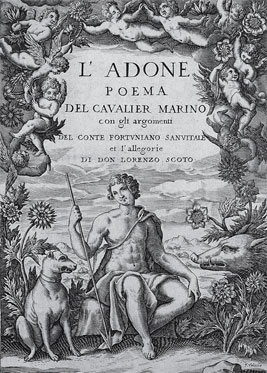
Title page of L'Adone

L'Adone (Adonis), which was published in Paris in 1623 and dedicated to the French king Louis XIII, is a mythological poem written in ottava rima divided into twenty cantos.

===== The plot =====
The poem deals with the love of the goddess Venus for Prince Adonis, who escapes from a sea storm to take refuge on the island of Cyprus, the site of the goddess's palace. Cupid uses his arrows to make his mother and Adonis fall in love with one another.

Adonis listens to Cupid and Mercury telling love stories and is then led to the Garden of Pleasure, which is divided into five parts, one for each of the senses, and to the fountain of Apollo. Jealousy warns the god Mars of Venus's new love and he heads for Cyprus. When Adonis finds out Mars is on his way, he flees and is transformed into a parrot for refusing the goddess's love. Having regained his human form thanks to Mercury, he is taken captive by a band of robbers.

Adonis returns to Cyprus, where he wins a contest of beauty, is made ruler of the island and is reunited with Venus. But Mars has Adonis killed on a hunting expedition by a wild boar. He dies in the arms of Venus and his heart is transformed into a red flower, the anemone. The poem ends with a long description of the funeral games in honour of the dead youth.

===== Narrative technique =====
Into this framework Marino inserts stories from mythology, including the Judgement of Paris, Cupid and Psyche, Echo and Narcissus, Hero and Leander, Polyphemus and numerous others. Thus the poem, which was originally intended to be only three cantos in length, was so enriched that it became one of the longest epics in Italian literature, made up of 5123 eight-line stanzas (40,984 verses), a story with digressions from the main theme and descriptive pauses.

All this tends to characterise "L’Adone" as a labyrinth of entangled situations without any real structure. The lengthy Canto XX, which takes place after the protagonist's death, serves to undermine any pretence to narrative unity. But this very lack of unity constitutes Marino's narrative innovation. The poet composes his work using various levels and passes from one episode to the next without any apparent logical connection, basing the links solely on a language rich in hyperboles, antitheses and metaphors.

In Adone, Marino quotes and rewrites passages from Dante's Divine Comedy, Ariosto, Tasso and the French literature of the day. The aim of these borrowings is not plagiarism but rather to introduce an erudite game with the reader, who must recognise the sources and appreciate the results of the revision. Marino challenges the reader to pick up on the quotations and to enjoy the way in which the material has been reworked, as part of a conception of poetic creation in which everything in the world (including the literature of the past) can become the object of new poetry. In this way, Marino also turns Adone into a kind of poetic encyclopaedia, which collects and modernises all the previous productions of human genius.

The poem is also evidence of a new sensibility connected with the latest scientific discoveries (see, for example, the eulogy of Galileo in Canto X) and geographical findings (such as Canto VII with its praise of the passiflora, a plant recently imported into Europe from the Americas).

Thus Adone, in spite of its technical virtuosity, is a work rich in authentic poetry written in a style which often achieves perfection of rhythm.

==== Other works in verse ====
Marino wrote other works in verse such as: I panegirici ("The Panegyrics"); La galleria ("The Gallery", descriptions of paintings and sculptures); the sacred poem in four cantos, La strage degli innocenti ("The Massacre of the Innocents", published posthumously c. 1631); the epic fragments Gerusalemme distrutta and Anversa liberata (still of uncertain attribution) inspired by Tasso; interesting and ingenious burlesque compositions such as La Murtoleide (81 satirical sonnets against Gaspare Murtola), the "capitolo" Lo stivale; Il Pupulo alla Pupula (burlesque letters) etc. Many works were announced but never written, including the long poem Le trasformazioni, inspired by Ovid's Metamorphoses, which was abandoned after Marino turned his attention to Adone.

=== Prose works ===
Most notable are the Dicerie sacre (1614), a sort of oratorical handbook for priests, which was considered indispensable by generations of preachers; in its enormously long sermons, which in reality have little to do with religion, Marino takes his transcendent technique of continuous metaphor to an extreme; a feat imitated throughout the Baroque era. More interesting for the modern reader are the "Letters", an eloquent document of his artistic and personal experience. In them, Marino rejects the accusation of sensuality levelled at his poetry, explaining that he was only living up to the expectations of the ruling class, as can be seen in a letter to Duke Carlo Emanuele I.

== Influence ==
Marino was famous in his time and acclaimed by his contemporaries as the successor and moderniser of Tasso. His influence on Italian and other literature in the 17th century was immense. In fact, he was the representative of a Europe-wide movement which included préciosité in France, Euphuism in England and culteranismo in Spain.

=== Music ===
Marino's verse was very popular with contemporary Italian composers, including Claudio Monteverdi who set several of Marino's poems in his collections of madrigals, beginning with the Sixth Book published in 1614. In 1626, Domenico Mazzocchi drew on Marino's epic for his opera La catena d'Adone ("The Chain of Adonis"). Filippo Bonaffino also set some of his work to music in the book of Madrigals.

=== Later literature ===
Marino is the subject of the short prose fiction "Una rosa amarilla" ("A Yellow Rose") by Jorge Luis Borges. It appeared in the collection El hacedor in 1960.

== Criticism ==
For a long time, critics, who had a negative assessment of Marino's work from the end of the 17th to the last decades of the 20th century, maintained that the poet's intention was to astound his readers through the elegance of the poem's details and his descriptions. But Adone, along with a great deal of Baroque literature, has been reevaluated, starting in the 1960s with Giovanni Getto, who was followed by the critic Marzio Pieri in 1975 and by Giovanni Pozzi in 1988, who, while denying the presence of a structure, recognised a highly refined form in the poem which he defined as "bilocal and elliptical", reflecting the "hesitation of 17th-century man between two contradictory models of the universe, the Ptolemaic and the Copernican". More recently, in 2002, Marie-France Tristan's essay La Scène de l'écriture appeared in France, stressing the philosophical element of Marino's poetry.

== Bibliography ==
The complete works of Marino, under the title "Marino Edition" and under the editorship of Marzio Pieri and Marco Albertazzi, with the aid of Luana Salvarani, Alessandra Ruffino and Diego Varini, are currently being published by "La Finestra". Volumes which have appeared so far include:

- I. Adone, ed. M. Pieri, I-III
- II. La Galeria, ed. M. Pieri and A. Ruffino.
- IV. La Sampogna con le egloghe boscarecce, ed. M. Pieri, A. Ruffino and L. Salvarani.

== Sources ==
- Harold Priest (1971). "Marino and Italian Baroque". The Bulletin of the Rocky Mountain Modern Language Association. 25 (4): 107–111. doi:10.2307/1346488. JSTOR 1346488.
- Tristan, Marie-France (2002). La Scène de l'écriture: essai sur la poésie philosophique du Cavalier Marin. Honoré Champion. ISBN 2745306707.
- Pieri, Marzio (1976). Per Marino. Liviana Scolastica. ISBN 8876752587.
- Pieri, Marzio (1996). Il Barocco, Marino e la poesia del Seicento. Istituto Poligrafico dello Stato. ISBN 8824019056.
- Maggi, Armando (1998). "La luminosità del limbo in 'La Strage degli Innocenti' di Giovanbattista Marino". Romance Notes. 38 (3): 295–301. JSTOR 43802897.
- Chisholm, Hugh, ed. (1911). "Marini, Giambattista" . Encyclopædia Britannica. Vol. 17 (11th ed.). Cambridge University Press. p. 721.
