= Italian literature =

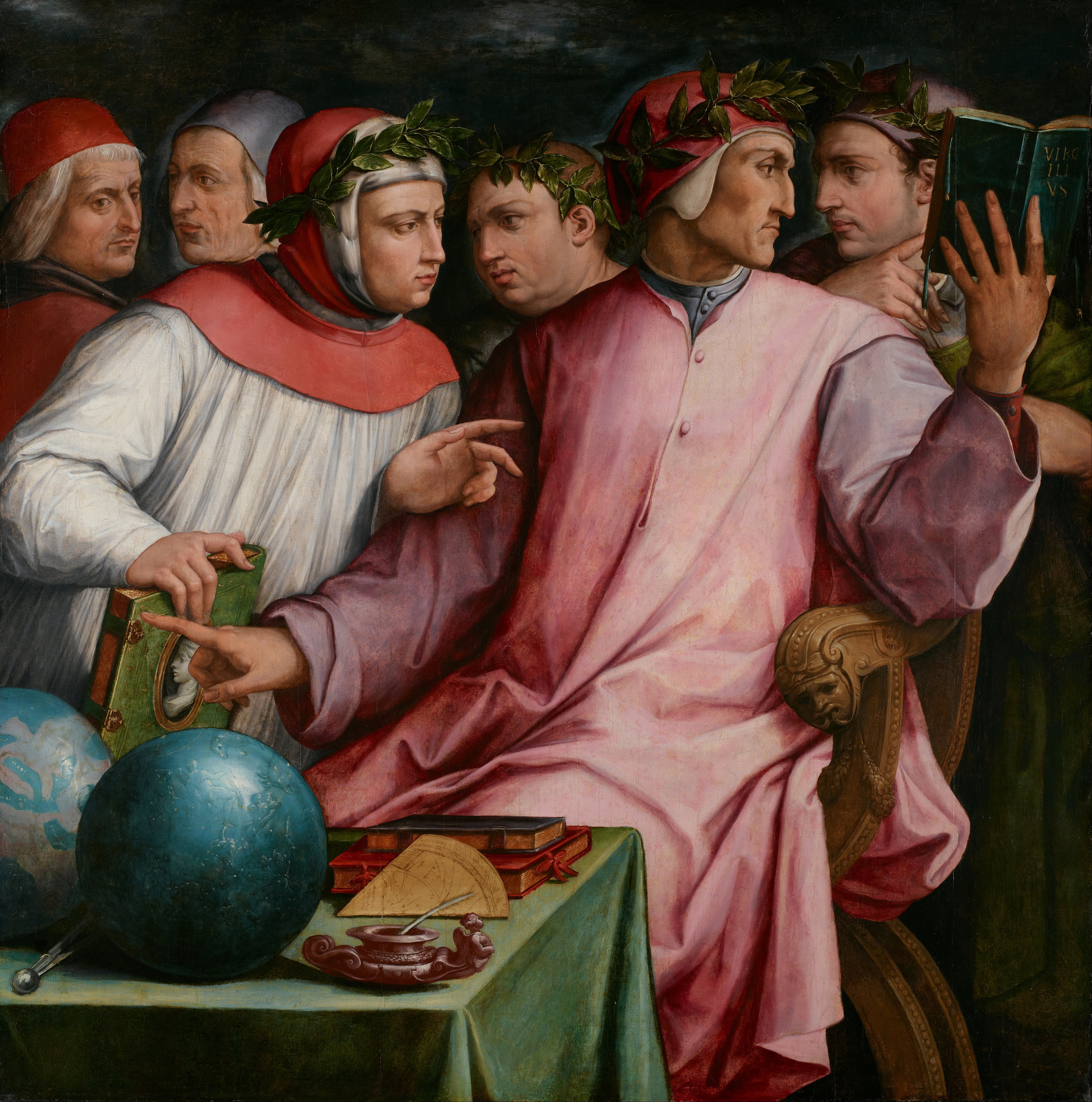
Medieval and Renaissance Italian writers portrayed by Giorgio Vasari in Six Tuscan Poets (1544). From left to right: Cristoforo Landino, Marsilio Ficino, Francesco Petrarca, Giovanni Boccaccio, Dante Alighieri, and Guido Cavalcanti.

Italian literature is written in the Italian language, particularly within Italy. It may also refer to literature written by Italians or in other languages spoken in Italy, often languages that are closely related to modern Italian, including regional varieties and vernacular dialects.

Italian literature began in the 12th century, when in different regions of the peninsula the Italian vernacular started to be used in a literary manner. The Ritmo laurenziano is the first extant document of Italian literature. In 1230, the Sicilian School became notable for being the first style in standard Italian. Renaissance humanism developed during the 14th and the beginning of the 15th centuries. Lorenzo de' Medici is regarded as the standard bearer of the influence of Florence on the Renaissance in the Italian states. The development of the drama in the 15th century was very great. In the 16th century, the fundamental characteristic of the era following the end of the Renaissance was that it perfected the Italian character of its language. Niccolò Machiavelli and Francesco Guicciardini were the chief originators of the science of history. Pietro Bembo was an influential figure in the development of the Italian language. In 1690, the Academy of Arcadia was instituted with the goal of "restoring" literature by imitating the simplicity of the ancient shepherds with sonnets, madrigals, canzonette, and blank verses.

In the 18th century, the political condition of the Italian states began to improve, and philosophers disseminated their writings and ideas throughout Europe during the Age of Enlightenment. The leading figure of the 18th century Italian literary revival was Giuseppe Parini. The philosophical, political, and socially progressive ideas behind the French Revolution of 1789 gave a special direction to Italian literature in the second half of the 18th century, inaugurated with the publication of Dei delitti e delle pene by Cesare Beccaria. Love of liberty and desire for equality created a literature aimed at national objects. Patriotism and classicism were the two principles that inspired the literature that began with the Italian dramatist and poet Vittorio Alfieri. The Romantic movement had as its organ the Conciliatore, established in 1818 at Milan. The main instigator of the reform was the Italian poet and novelist Alessandro Manzoni. The great Italian poet of the age was Giacomo Leopardi. The literary movement that preceded and was contemporary with the political revolutions of 1848 may be said to be represented by four writers: Giuseppe Giusti, Francesco Domenico Guerrazzi, Vincenzo Gioberti, and Cesare Balbo.

After the Risorgimento, political literature became less important. The first part of this period is characterized by two divergent trends of literature that both opposed Romanticism: the Scapigliatura and Verismo. Important early 20th century Italian writers include Giovanni Pascoli, Italo Svevo, Gabriele D'Annunzio, Umberto Saba, Giuseppe Ungaretti, Eugenio Montale, and Luigi Pirandello. Neorealism was developed by Alberto Moravia. Pier Paolo Pasolini became notable for being one of the most controversial authors in the history of Italy. Umberto Eco became internationally successful with the Medieval detective story Il nome della rosa (1980). The Nobel Prize in Literature has been awarded to Italian language authors six times (as of 2019) with winners including Giosuè Carducci, Grazia Deledda, Luigi Pirandello, Salvatore Quasimodo, Eugenio Montale, and Dario Fo.

== Early medieval Latin literature ==
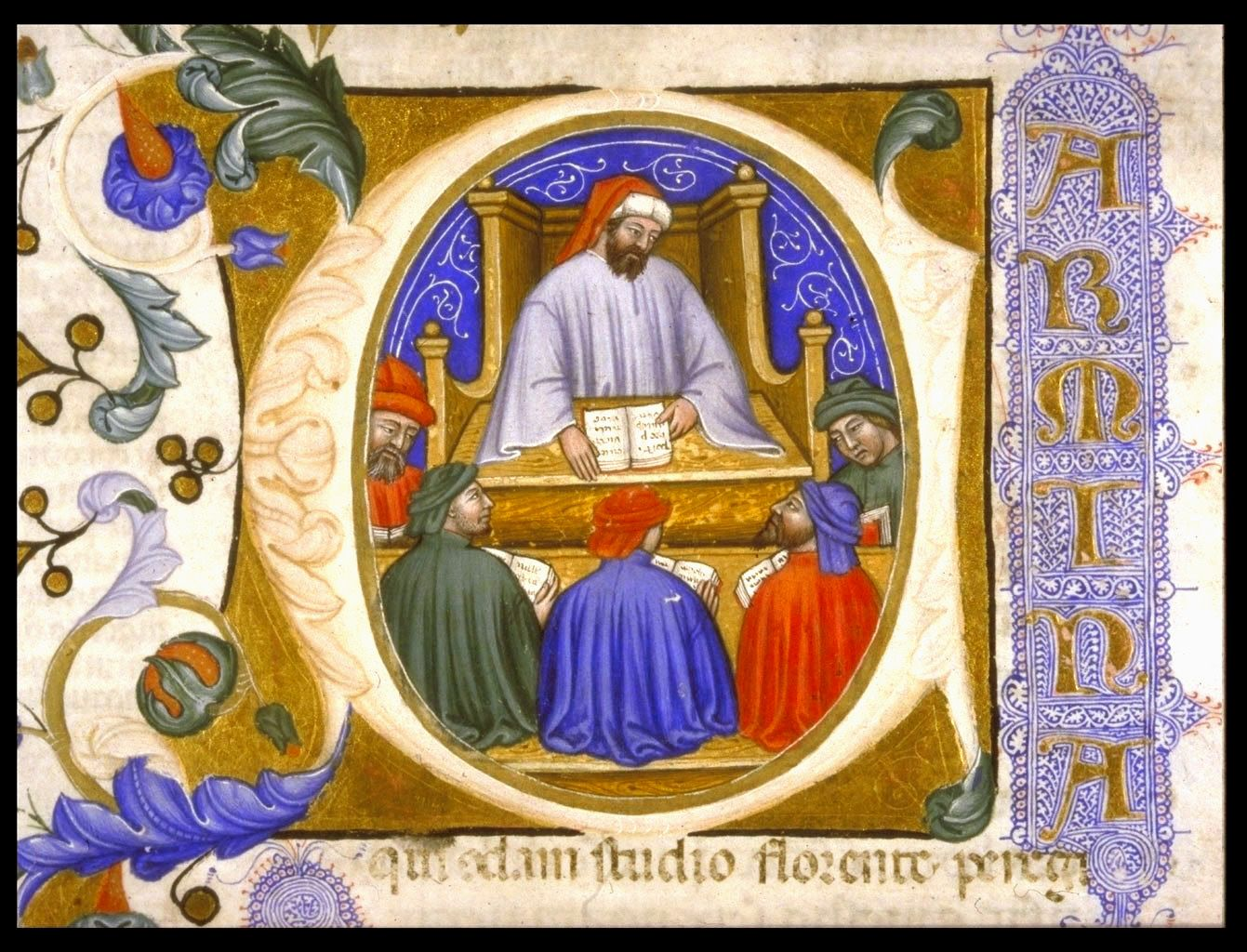
A depiction of Boethius teaching his students (1385). Boethius, a 6th century Christian philosopher, helped keep alive the classic tradition in post-Roman Italy.

As the Western Roman Empire declined, the Latin tradition was kept alive by writers such as Cassiodorus, Boethius, and Symmachus. The liberal arts flourished at Ravenna under Theodoric, and the Gothic kings surrounded themselves with masters of rhetoric and of grammar. Some lay schools remained in Italy, and noted scholars included Magnus Felix Ennodius, Arator, Venantius Fortunatus, Felix the Grammarian, Peter of Pisa, Paulinus of Aquileia, and many others.

The later establishment of the medieval universities of Bologna, Padua, Vicenza, Naples, Salerno, Modena and Parma helped to spread culture and prepared the ground in which the new vernacular literature developed. Classical traditions did not disappear, and affection for the memory of Rome, a preoccupation with politics, and a preference for practice over theory combined to influence the development of Italian literature.

== High medieval literature ==
=== Trovatori ===
The beginning of Rambertino Buvalelli's D'un saluz uoill m'entremetre, with a decorated initial D, and Rambertino's name (Lanbertin de Buualel) at top

The earliest vernacular literary tradition in Italy was in Occitan, spoken in parts of northwest Italy. A tradition of vernacular lyric poetry arose in Poitou in the early 12th century and spread south and east, eventually reaching Italy by the end of the 12th century. The first troubadours (trovatori in Italian), as these Occitan lyric poets were called, to practise in Italy were from elsewhere, but the high aristocracy of the northern Italy was ready to patronise them. It was not long before native Italians adopted Occitan as a vehicle for poetic expression.

Among the early patrons of foreign troubadours were especially the House of Este, the Da Romano, House of Savoy, and the Malaspina. Azzo VI of Este entertained the troubadours Aimeric de Belenoi, Aimeric de Peguilhan, Albertet de Sestaro, and Peire Raimon de Tolosa from Occitania and Rambertino Buvalelli from Bologna, one of the earliest Italian troubadours. Azzo VI's daughter Beatrice was an object of Rambertino's courtly love. Azzo's son, Azzo VII, hosted Elias Cairel and Arnaut Catalan. Rambertino was named podestà of Genoa in 1218, and it was probably during his three-year tenure there that he introduced Occitan lyric poetry to the city, which later developed a flourishing Occitan literary culture.

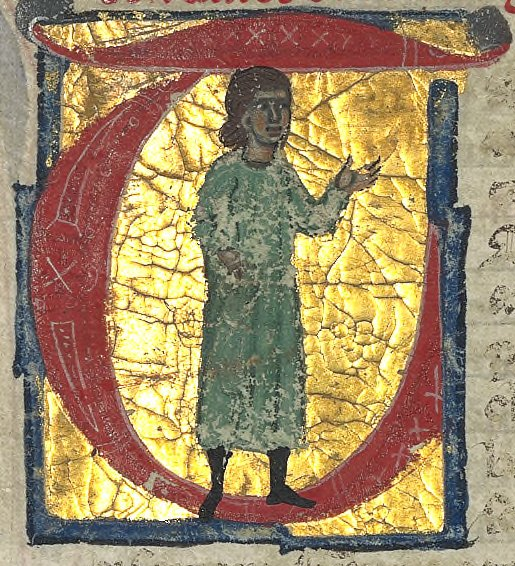
Sordello from a 13th century manuscript

The margraves of Montferrat—Boniface I, William VI, and Boniface II—were patrons of Occitan poetry. Among the Genoese troubadours were Lanfranc Cigala, Calega Panzan, Jacme Grils, and Bonifaci Calvo. Genoa was also the place of the genesis of the podestà-troubadour phenomenon: men who served in several cities as podestàs on behalf of either the Guelph or Ghibelline party and who wrote political poetry in Occitan. Rambertino Buvalelli was the first podestà-troubadour and in Genoa there were the Guelphs Luca Grimaldi and Luchetto Gattilusio and the Ghibellines Perceval and Simon Doria.

Perhaps the most important aspect of the Italian troubadour phenomenon was the production of chansonniers and the composition of vidas and razos. Uc de Saint Circ undertook to author the entire razo corpus and a great many of the vidas. The most famous and influential Italian troubadour was Sordello.

The troubadours had a connection with the rise of a school of poetry in the Kingdom of Sicily. In 1220, Obs de Biguli was present as a "singer" at the coronation of the Emperor Frederick II. Guillem Augier Novella before 1230 and Guilhem Figueira thereafter were important Occitan poets at Frederick's court. The Albigensian Crusade had devastated Languedoc and forced many troubadours of the area to flee to Italy, where an Italian tradition of papal criticism was begun.

=== Chivalric romance ===
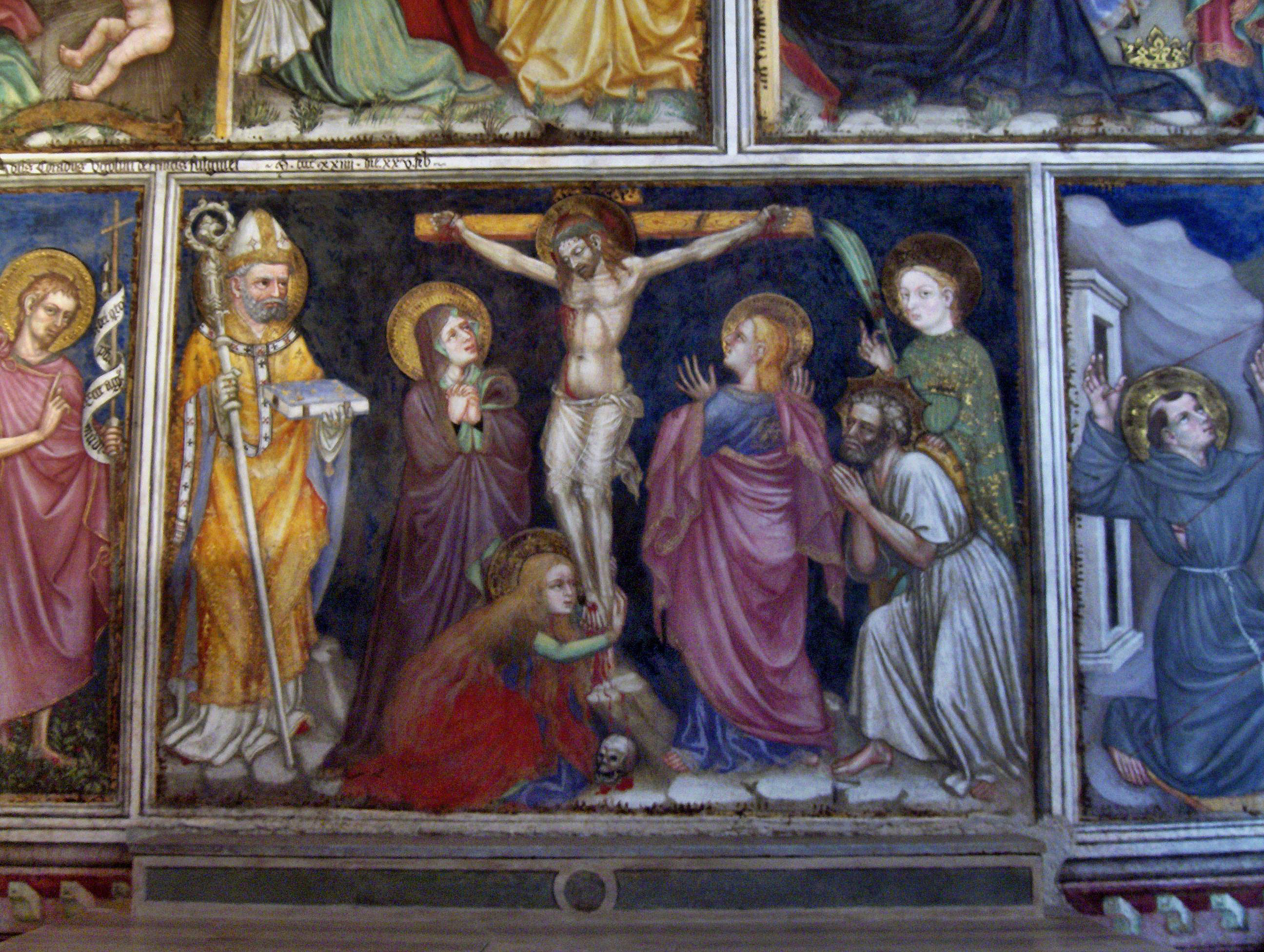
Jacobus de Voragine with the Golden Legend in his hand, fresco by Ottaviano Nelli, chapel of Palazzo Trinci, Foligno, Italy

The Historia de excidio Trojae, attributed to Dares Phrygius, claimed to be an eyewitness account of the Trojan War. Guido delle Colonne of Messina, one of the vernacular poets of the Sicilian school, composed the Historia destructionis Troiae. In his poetry, Guido was an imitator of the Provençals, but in this book he converted Benoît de Sainte-Maure's French romance into what sounded like serious Latin history.

Much the same thing occurred with other great legends. Quilichino of Spoleto wrote couplets about the legend of Alexander the Great. Europe was full of the legend of King Arthur, but the Italians contented themselves with translating and abridging French romances. Jacobus de Voragine, while collecting his Golden Legend (1260), remained a historian. Farfa, Marsicano, and other scholars translated Aristotle, the precepts of the school of Salerno, and the travels of Marco Polo, linking the classics and the Renaissance.

At the same time, epic poetry was written in a mixed language, a dialect of Italian based on French: hybrid words exhibited a treatment of sounds according to the rules of both languages, had French roots with Italian endings, and were pronounced according to Italian or Latin rules. Examples include the chansons de geste, Macaire, the Entrée d'Espagne written by Anonymous of Padua, the Prise de Pampelune, written by Niccolò of Verona, and others. All this preceded the appearance of purely Italian literature.

== Emergence of native vernacular literature ==
Laudes creaturarum by Saint Francis of Assisi

The French and Occitan languages gradually gave way to the native Italian. Hybridism recurred, but it no longer predominated. In the Bovo d'Antona and the Rainaldo e Lesengrino, Venetian is clearly felt, although the language is influenced by French forms. These writings, which Graziadio Isaia Ascoli has called miste (mixed), immediately preceded the appearance of purely Italian works.

There is evidence that a type of literature already existed before the 13th century: the Ritmo cassinese, Ritmo di Sant'Alessio, Laudes creaturarum, Ritmo lucchese, Ritmo laurenziano, Ritmo bellunese are classified by Cesare Segre, et al. as "Archaic Works" ("Componimenti Arcaici"): "such are labelled the first literary works in the Italian vernacular, their dates ranging from the last decades of the 12th century to the early decades of the 13th". However, as he points out, such early literature does not yet present any uniform stylistic or linguistic traits.

This early development, however, was simultaneous in the whole peninsula, varying only in the subject matter of the art. In the north, the poems of Giacomino da Verona and Bonvesin da la Riva were written in a dialect of Lombard and Venetian. This sort of composition may have been encouraged by the old custom in the north of Italy of listening to the songs of the jongleurs.

=== Sicilian School ===
The year 1230 marked the beginning of the Sicilian School and of literature showing more uniform traits. Its importance lies more in the language (the creation of the first standard Italian) than its subject, a love song partly modelled on the Provençal poetry imported to the south by the Normans and the Svevs under Frederick II. This poetry differs from the French equivalent in its treatment of the woman, less erotic and more platonic, a vein further developed by Dolce Stil Novo in later 13th century Bologna and Florence. The customary repertoire of chivalry terms is adapted to Italian phonotactics, creating new Italian vocabulary. These were adopted by Dante and his contemporaries, and handed on to future generations of Italian writers.

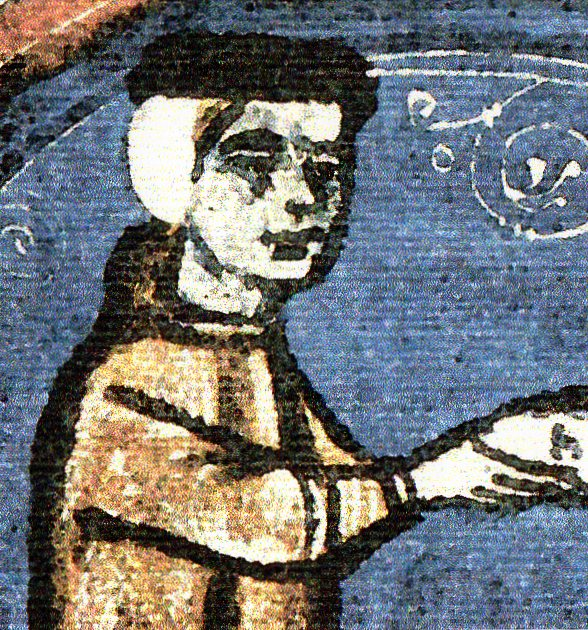
Giacomo da Lentini (detail of a 14th century miniature, National Central Library of Florence)

To the Sicilian school belonged Enzio, king of Sardinia, Pietro della Vigna, Inghilfredi, Guido and Odo delle Colonne, Jacopo d'Aquino, Ruggieri Apugliese, Giacomo da Lentini, Arrigo Testa, and others. Most famous is Io m'aggio posto in core, by Giacomo da Lentini, the head of the movement, but there is also poetry written by Frederick himself. Giacomo da Lentini is also credited with inventing the sonnet, a form later perfected by Dante, Petrarch and Boccaccio. The censorship imposed by Frederick meant that no political matter entered literary debate. In this respect, the poetry of the north, still divided into communes or city-states with relatively democratic governments, provided new ideas. These new ideas are shown in the Sirventese genre, and later, Dante's Commedia, full of invectives against contemporary political leaders and popes.

Though the conventional love song prevailed at Frederick's (and later Manfred's) court, more spontaneous poetry existed in the Contrasto attributed to Cielo d'Alcamo. The Contrasto is probably a scholarly re-elaboration of a lost popular rhyme and is the closest to a type of poetry that perished or was smothered by the ancient Sicilian literature. The poems of the Sicilian school were written in the first known standard Italian. This was elaborated by these poets under the direction of Frederick II and combines many traits typical of the Sicilian, and to a lesser extent, Apulian dialects and other southern dialects, with many words of Latin and French origin.

Dante's styles illustre, cardinale, aulico, curiale were developed from his linguistic study of the Sicilian School, whose technical features had been imported by Guittone d'Arezzo in Tuscany. The standard changed slightly in Tuscany because Tuscan scriveners perceived the five-vowel system used by southern Italians as a seven-vowel one. As a consequence, the texts that Italian students read in their anthology contain lines that appear not to rhyme, a feature known as ″Sicilian rhyme" (rima siciliana) which was widely used later by poets such as Dante or Petrarch.

=== Religious literature ===
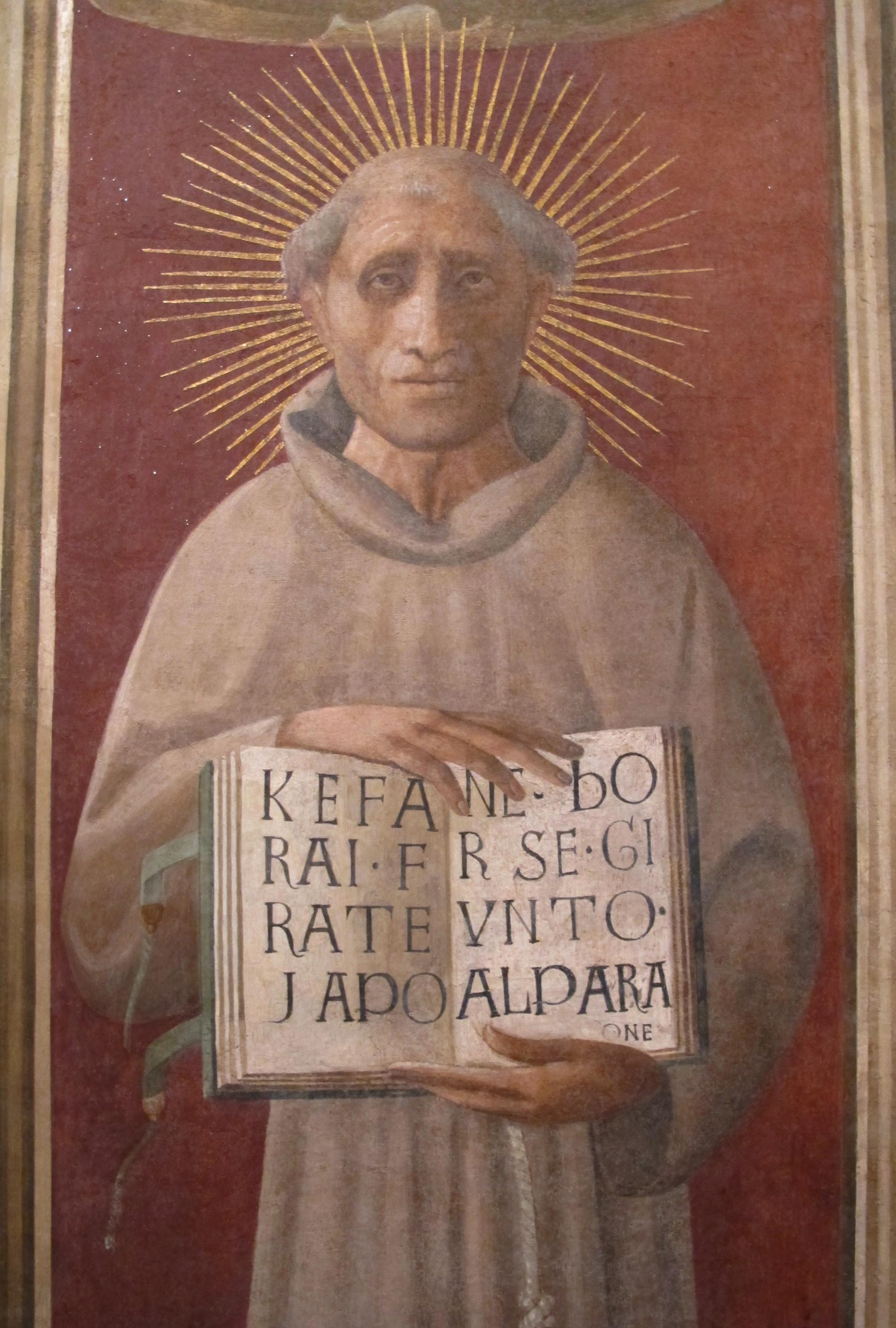
Jacopone da Todi, fresco by Paolo Uccello, in the cathedral of Prato

The earliest preserved sermons in the Italian language are from Jordan of Pisa, a Dominican. Francis of Assisi, the founder of the Franciscans, also wrote poetry. According to legend, Francis dictated the hymn Cantico del Sole in the eighteenth year of his penance. It was the first great poetical work of northern Italy, written in a type of verse marked by assonance, a poetic device more widespread in Northern Europe.

Jacopone da Todi was a poet who represented the religious feeling that had made special progress in Umbria. Jacopone was possessed by St. Francis's mysticism, but was also a satirist who mocked the corruption and hypocrisy of the Church. The religious movement in Umbria was followed by another literary phenomenon, the religious drama. In 1258 a hermit, Raniero Fasani, represented himself as sent by God to disclose mysterious visions, and to announce to the world terrible visitations. Fasani's pronouncements stimulated the formation of the Compagnie di Disciplinanti, who, for a penance, scourged themselves until they drew blood, and sang Laudi in dialogue in their confraternities. These laudi, closely connected with the liturgy, were the first example of drama in the vernacular tongue of Italy. They were written in the Umbrian dialect, in verses of eight syllables. As early as the end of the 13th century the Devozioni del Giovedi e Venerdi Santo appeared, mixing liturgy and drama. Later, di un Monaco che andò al servizio di Dio ('of a monk who entered the service of God') approached the definite form the religious drama would assume in the following centuries.

=== First Tuscan literature ===
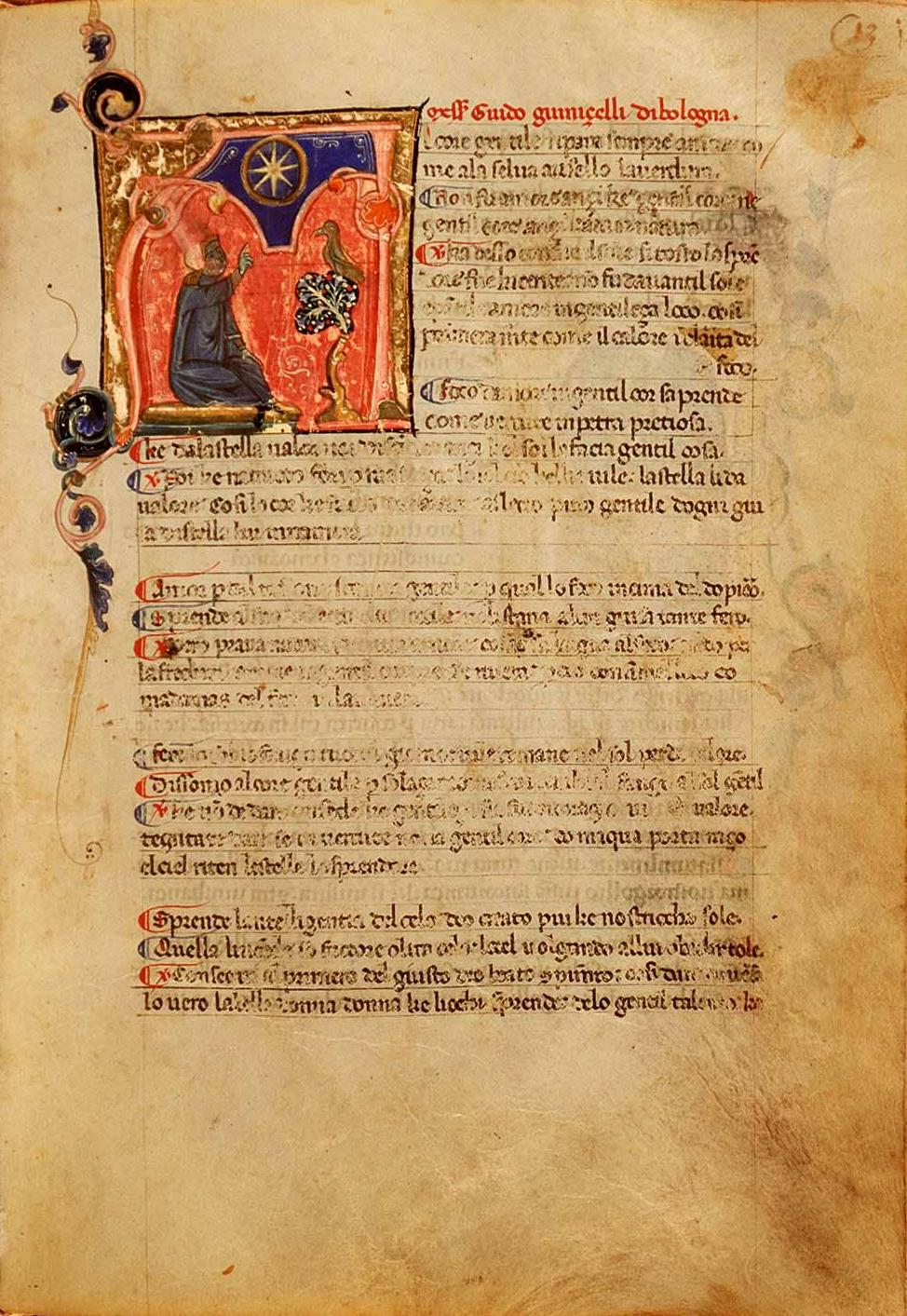
Page of the Banco Rari Code in which it is contained Al cor gentil rempaira sempre amore by Guido Guinizelli

13th century Tuscans spoke a dialect that closely resembled Latin and afterwards became, almost exclusively, the language of literature, and which was already regarded at the end of the 13th century as surpassing other dialects. In Tuscany, too, popular love poetry existed. A school of imitators of the Sicilians was led by Dante da Majano, but its literary originality took another line—that of humorous and satirical poetry. The entirely democratic form of government created a style of poetry that stood strongly against the medieval mystic and chivalrous style. The sonnets of Rustico di Filippo are half-fun and half-satire, as is the work of Cecco Angiolieri of Siena, the oldest known humorist. Another type of poetry also began in Tuscany. Guittone d'Arezzo made art quit chivalry and Provençal forms for national motives and Latin forms. He attempted political poetry and prepared the way for the Bolognese school. Bologna was the city of science, and philosophical poetry appeared there. Guido Guinizelli was the poet after the new fashion of the art. In his work, the ideas of chivalry are changed and enlarged. Guinizelli's Canzoni make up the bible of Dolce Stil Novo, and one in particular, "Al cor gentil" ('To a Kind Heart'), is considered the manifesto of the new movement that bloomed in Florence under Cavalcanti, Dante, and their followers. He marks a great development in the history of Italian art, especially because of his close connection with Dante's lyric poetry.

In the 13th century, there were several major allegorical poems. One of these is by Brunetto Latini: his Tesoretto is a short poem, in seven-syllable verses, rhyming in couplets, in which the author is lost in a wilderness and meets a lady, who represents Nature and gives him much instruction. Francesco da Barberino wrote two little allegorical poems, the Documenti d'amore and Del reggimento e dei costumi delle donne. The poems today are generally studied not as literature, but for historical context.

In the 15th century, humanist and publisher Aldus Manutius published Tuscan poets Petrarch and Dante Alighieri (Divine Comedy), creating the model for what became a standard for modern Italian.

=== Development of early prose ===
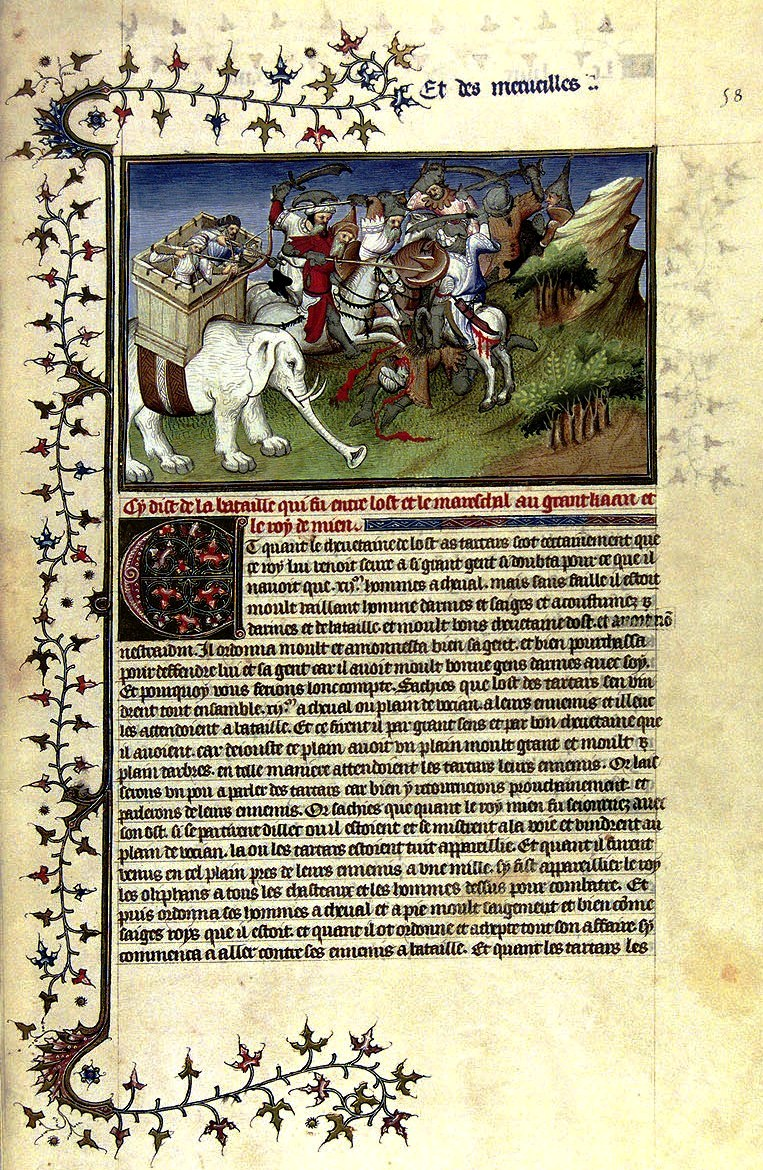
Travels of Marco Polo by Rustichello da Pisa and Marco Polo

Italian prose of the 13th century was as abundant and varied as its poetry. Halfway through the century, a certain Aldobrando or Aldobrandino wrote a book for Beatrice of Savoy, called Le Régime du corps. In 1267 Martino da Canale wrote a history of Venice in the same Old French (langue d'oïl). Rustichello da Pisa composed many chivalrous romances, derived from the Arthurian cycle, and subsequently wrote the Travels of Marco Polo, which may have been dictated by Polo himself. And finally Brunetto Latini wrote his Tesoro in French. Latini also wrote some works in Italian prose such as La rettorica, an adaptation from Cicero's De inventione, and translated three orations from Cicero. Another important writer was the Florentine judge Bono Giamboni, who translated Orosius's Historiae adversus paganos, Vegetius's Epitoma rei militaris, made a translation/adaptation of Cicero's De inventione mixed with the Rethorica ad Erennium, and a translation/adaptation of Innocent III's De miseria humane conditionis. He also wrote an allegorical novel called Libro de' Vizi e delle Virtudi. Andrea of Grosseto, in 1268, translated three Treaties of Albertanus of Brescia, from Latin to Tuscan.

After the original compositions in the langue d'oïl came translations or adaptations from the same. There are some moral narratives taken from religious legends, a romance of Julius Caesar, some short histories of ancient knights, the Tavola rotonda, translations of the Viaggi of Marco Polo, and of Latini's Tesoro. At the same time, translations from Latin of moral and ascetic works, histories, and treatises on rhetoric and oratory appeared. Also noteworthy is Composizione del mondo, a scientific book by Ristoro d'Arezzo, who lived about the middle of the 13th century.

Another short treatise exists: De regimine rectoris, by Fra Paolino, a Minorite friar of Venice, who was bishop of Pozzuoli, and who also wrote a Latin chronicle. His treatise stands in close relation to that of Egidio Colonna, De regimine principum. It is written in Venetian.

The 13th century was very rich in tales. A collection called the Cento Novelle antiche contains stories drawn from many sources, including Asian, Greek and Trojan traditions, ancient and medieval history, the legends of Brittany, Provence and Italy, the Bible, local Italian traditions, and histories of animals and old mythology.

On the whole the Italian novels of the 13th century have little originality, and are a faint reflection of the very rich legendary literature of France. Some attention should be paid to the Lettere of Fra Guittone d'Arezzo, who wrote many poems and also some letters in prose, the subjects of which are moral and religious. Guittone's love of antiquity and the traditions of Rome and its language was so strong that he tried to write Italian in a Latin style. The letters are obscure, involved and altogether barbarous. Guittone took as his special model Seneca the Younger, Aristotle, Cicero, Boethius and Augustine of Hippo. Guittone viewed his style as very artistic, but later scholars view it as extravagant and grotesque.

=== Dolce Stil Novo ===
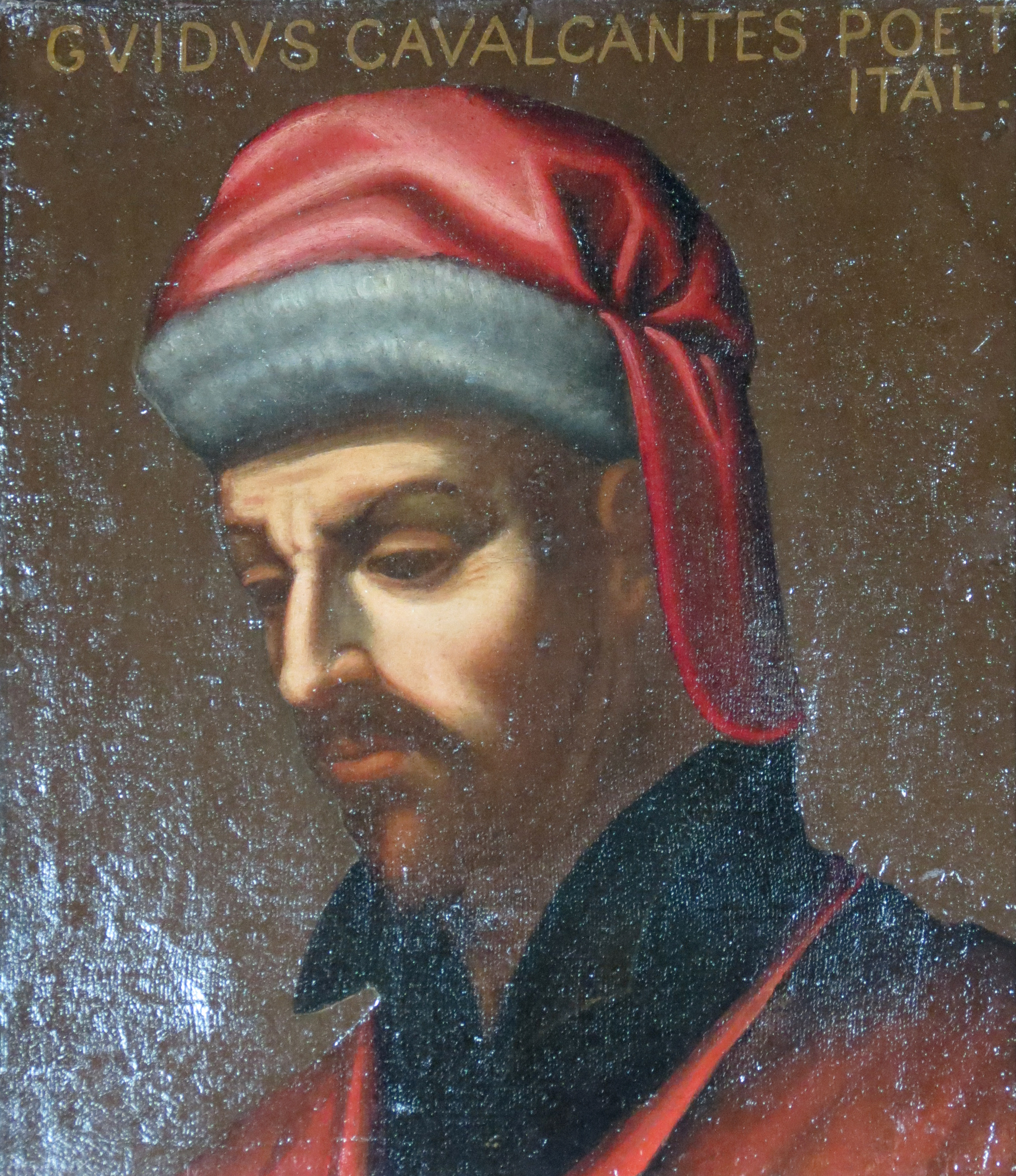
Painting on the gallery of portraits from the castle of Beauregard in Cellettes representing Guido Cavalcanti

With the school of Lapo Gianni, Guido Cavalcanti, Cino da Pistoia and Dante Alighieri, lyric poetry became exclusively Tuscan. The whole novelty and poetic power of this school, consisted in, according to Dante, Quando Amore spira, noto, ed a quel niodo Ch'ei detta dentro, vo significando: that is, in a power of expressing the feelings of the soul in the way in which love inspires them, in an appropriate and graceful manner, fitting form to matter, and by art fusing one with the other. This a neo-platonic approach widely endorsed by Dolce Stil Novo, and although in Cavalcanti's case, it can be upsetting and even destructive, it is nonetheless a metaphysical experience able to lift man onto a higher, spiritual dimension. Gianni's new style was still influenced by the Siculo-Provençal school.

Cavalcanti's poems fall into two classes: those that portray the philosopher (il sottilissimo dialettico, as Lorenzo the Magnificent called him) and those more directly the product of his poetic nature imbued with mysticism and metaphysics. To the first set belongs the famous poem Sulla natura d'amore, which in fact is a treatise on amorous metaphysics, and was annotated later in a learned way by renowned Platonic philosophers of the 15th century, such as Marsilius Ficinus and others. On the other hand, in his Ballate, he pours himself out ingenuously, but with a consciousness of his art. The greatest of these is considered to be the ballata composed by Cavalcanti when he was banished from Florence with the party of the Bianchi in 1300, and took refuge at Sarzana.

== 14th century: the roots of Renaissance ==
=== Dante ===
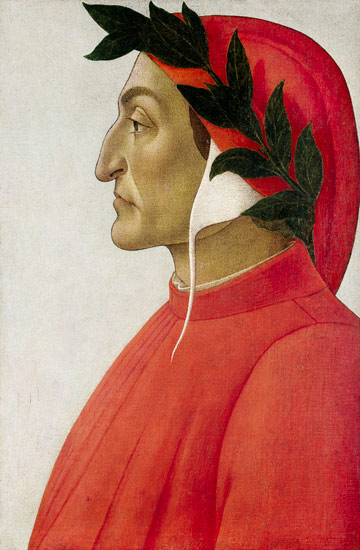
Profile portrait of Dante Alighieri, by Sandro Botticelli

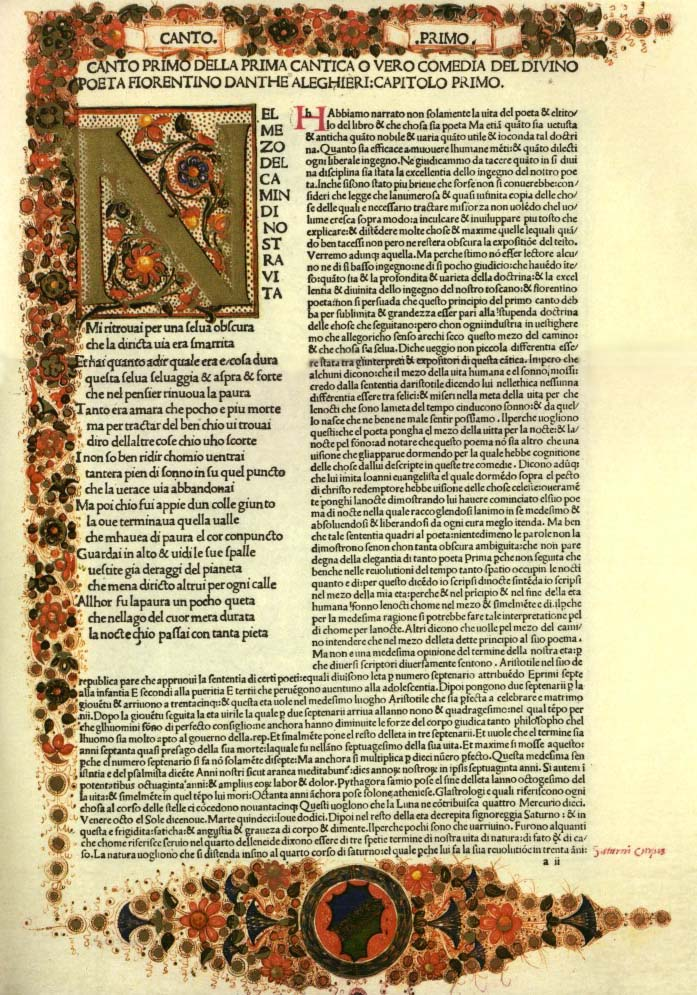
First page of an early printed edition of Dante's Divine Comedy

Dante Alighieri, one of the greatest of Italian poets, also shows these lyrical tendencies. In 1293 he wrote La Vita Nuova, in which he idealizes love. It is a collection of poems to which Dante added narration and explication. Everything is sensual, aerial, and heavenly, and the real Beatrice is supplanted by an idealized vision of her, losing her human nature and becoming a representation of the divine. The Divine Comedy tells of the poet's travels through the three realms of the dead—Hell, Purgatory, and Paradise—accompanied by the Latin poet Virgil. An allegorical meaning hides under the literal one of this great epic. Dante, travelling through Hell, Purgatory, and Paradise, symbolizes mankind aiming at the double object of temporal and eternal happiness. The forest where the poet loses himself lost symbolizes sin. The mountain illuminated by the sun is the universal monarchy. Envy is Florence, Pride is the house of France, and Avarice is the papal court. Virgil represents reason and the empire. Beatrice is the symbol of the supernatural aid mankind must have to attain the supreme end, which is God.

The merit of the poem lies is the individual art of the poet, the classic art transfused for the first time into a Romance form. Whether he describes nature, analyses passions, curses the vices or sings hymns to the virtues, Dante is notable for the grandeur and delicacy of his art. He took the materials for his poem from theology, philosophy, history, and mythology, but especially from his own passions, from hatred and love. The Divine Comedy ranks among the finest works of world literature.

=== Petrarch ===
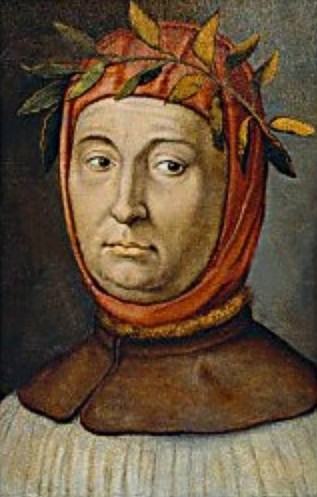
Petrarch

Petrarch was the first humanist, and he was at the same time the first modern lyric poet. His career was long and tempestuous. He lived for many years at Avignon, cursing the corruption of the papal court; he travelled through nearly the whole of Europe; he corresponded with emperors and popes, and he was considered the most important writer of his time. Petrarch's lyric verse is quite different, not only from that of the Provençal troubadours and the Italian poets before him, but also from the lyrics of Dante. Petrarch is a psychological poet, who examines all his feelings and renders them with an art of exquisite sweetness. The lyrics of Petrarch are no longer transcendental like Dante's, but keep entirely within human limits.

The Canzoniere includes a few political poems, one supposed to be addressed to Cola di Rienzi and several sonnets against the court of Avignon. These are remarkable for their vigour of feeling, and also for showing that, compared to Dante, Petrarch had a sense of a broader Italian consciousness.

=== Boccaccio ===
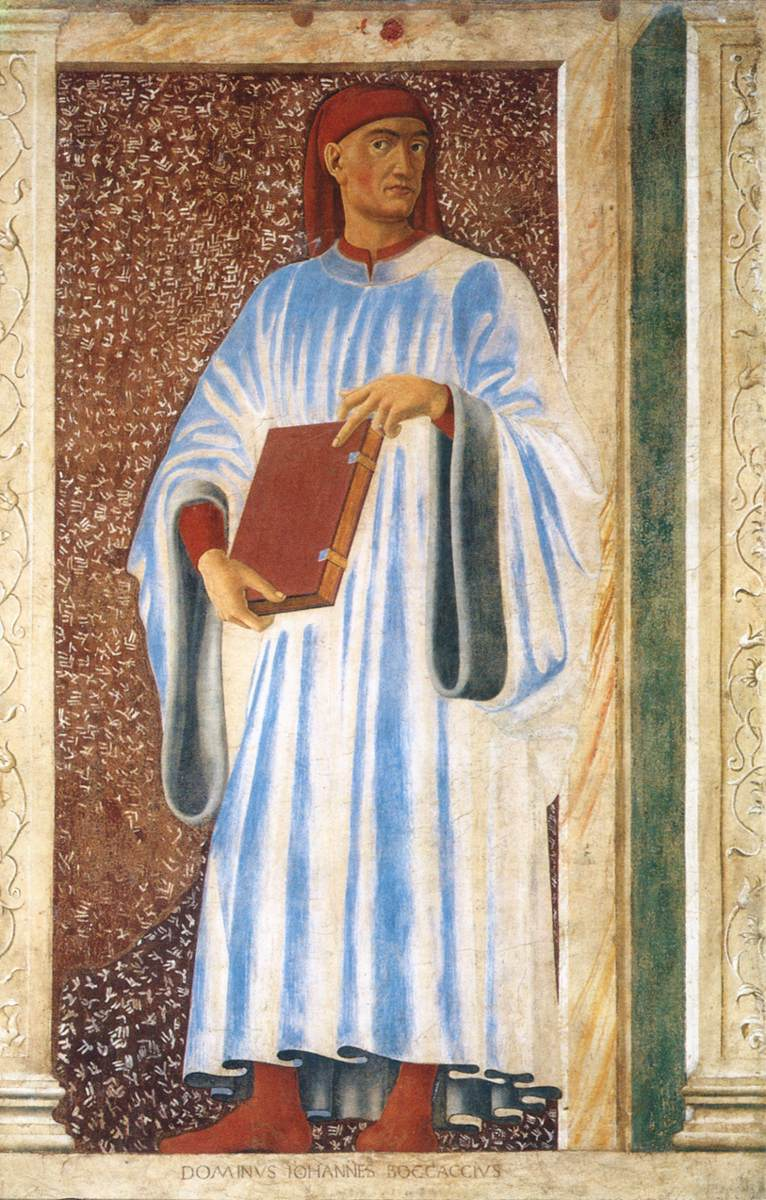
Giovanni Boccaccio presenting the Decamerone, depicted by Andrea del Castagno in a fresco preserved in the Uffizi

Giovanni Boccaccio had the same enthusiastic love of antiquity and the same worship for the new Italian literature as Petrarch. He was the first to put together a Latin translation of the Iliad and, in 1375, the Odyssey. His classical learning was shown in the work De genealogia deorum; as A. H. Heeren said, it is an encyclopaedia of mythological knowledge; and it was the precursor of the humanist movement of the 15th century. Boccaccio was also the first historian of women in his De mulieribus claris, and the first to tell the story of the great unfortunates in his De casibus virorum illustrium. He continued and perfected former geographical investigations in his De montibus, silvis, fontibus, lacubus, fluminibus, stagnis, et paludibus, et de nominibus maris, for which he made use of Vibius Sequester.

He did not invent the octave stanza, but was the first to use it in a work of length and artistic merit, his Teseide, the oldest Italian romantic poem. The Filostrato relates the loves of Troiolo and Griseida (Troilus and Cressida). The Ninfale fiesolano tells the love story of the nymph Mesola and the shepherd Africo. The Amorosa Visione, a poem in triplets, doubtless owed its origin to the Divine Comedy. The Ameto is a mixture of prose and poetry, and is the first Italian pastoral romance. Boccaccio became famous principally for the Italian work, Decamerone, a collection of a hundred novels, related by a party of men and women who retired to a villa near Florence to escape the plague in 1348. Novel writing, so abundant in the preceding centuries, especially in France, now for the first time assumed an artistic shape. The style of Boccaccio tends to the imitation of Latin, but in him, prose first took the form of elaborated art. Over and above this, in the Decamerone, Boccaccio is a delineator of character and an observer of passions. Much has been written about the sources of the novels of the Decamerone. Probably Boccaccio made use both of written and of oral sources.

=== Others ===
==== Imitators ====
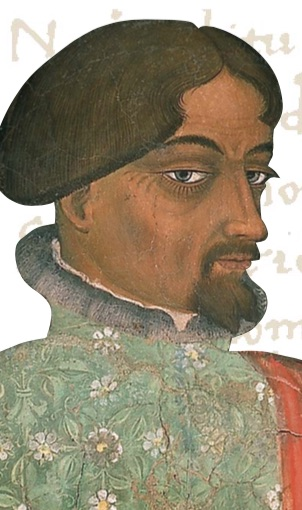
Federico Frezzi

Fazio degli Uberti and Federico Frezzi were imitators of the Divine Comedy, but only in its external form. Giovanni Fiorentino wrote, under the title of Pecorone, a collection of tales, which are supposed to have been related by a monk and a nun in the parlour of the monastery Novelists of Forli. He closely imitated Boccaccio, and drew on Villani's chronicle for his historical stories. Franco Sacchetti wrote tales too, for the most part on subjects taken from Florentine history. The subjects are almost always improper, but it is evident that Sacchetti collected these anecdotes so he could draw his own conclusions and moral reflections, which he puts at the end of each story. From this point of view, Sacchetti's work comes near to the Monalisaliones of the Middle Ages. A third novelist was Giovanni Sercambi of Lucca, who after 1374 wrote a book, in imitation of Boccaccio, about a party of people who were supposed to fly from a plague and to go travelling about in different Italian cities, stopping here and there telling stories. Later, but important, names are those of Masuccio Salernitano (Tommaso Guardato), who wrote the Novellino, and Antonio Cornazzano whose Proverbii became extremely popular.

==== Chronicles ====
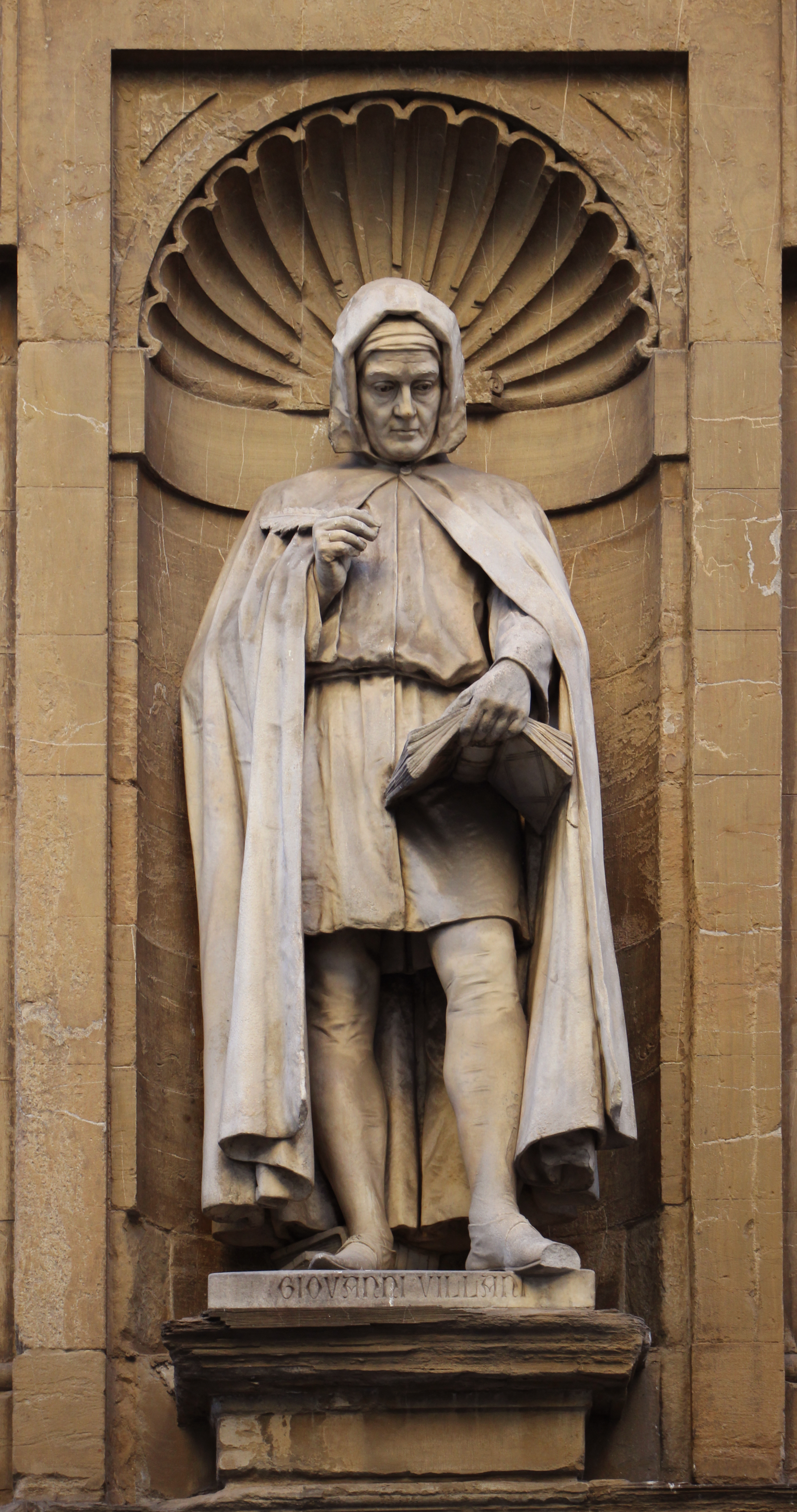
Statue of Giovanni Villani by Gaetano Trentanove in the Loggia del Mercato Nuovo in Florence

Chronicles formerly believed to have been of the 13th century are now mainly regarded as forgeries. At the end of the 13th century there is a chronicle by Dino Compagni, probably authentic.

Giovanni Villani, born in 1300, was more of a chronicler than a historian. He relates the events up to 1347. The journeys that he made in Italy and France, and the information thus acquired, mean that his chronicle, the Historie Fiorentine, covers events all over Europe. Matteo was the brother of Giovanni Villani, and continued the chronicle up to 1363. It was again continued by Filippo Villani.

==== Ascetics ====
St Catherine of Siena's mysticism was political. She aspired to bring back the Church of Rome to evangelical virtue, and left a collection of letters written to all types of people, including popes.

Another Sienese, Giovanni Colombini, founder of the order of Jesuati, preached poverty by precept and example, going back to the religious idea of St Francis of Assisi. His letters are among the most remarkable in the category of ascetic works in the 14th century. Bianco da Siena wrote several religiously-inspired poems (lauda) that were popular in the Middle Ages. Jacopo Passavanti, in his Specchio della vera penitenza, attached instruction to narrative. Domenico Cavalca translated from the Latin the Vite de' Santi Padri. Rivalta left behind him many sermons, and Franco Sacchetti (the famous novelist) many discourses. On the whole, there is no doubt that one of the most important productions of the Italian spirit of the 14th century was religious literature.

==== Popular works ====
Humorous poetry, largely developed in the 13th century, was carried on in the 14th by Bindo Bonichi, Arrigo di Castruccio, Cecco Nuccoli, Andrea Orcagna, Lippo Pasci de' Bardi, Adriano de Rossi, Antonio Pucci and other lesser writers. Orcagna was especially comic; Bonichi was comic with a satirical and moral purpose. Pucci was superior to all of them for the variety of his production.

==== Political works ====
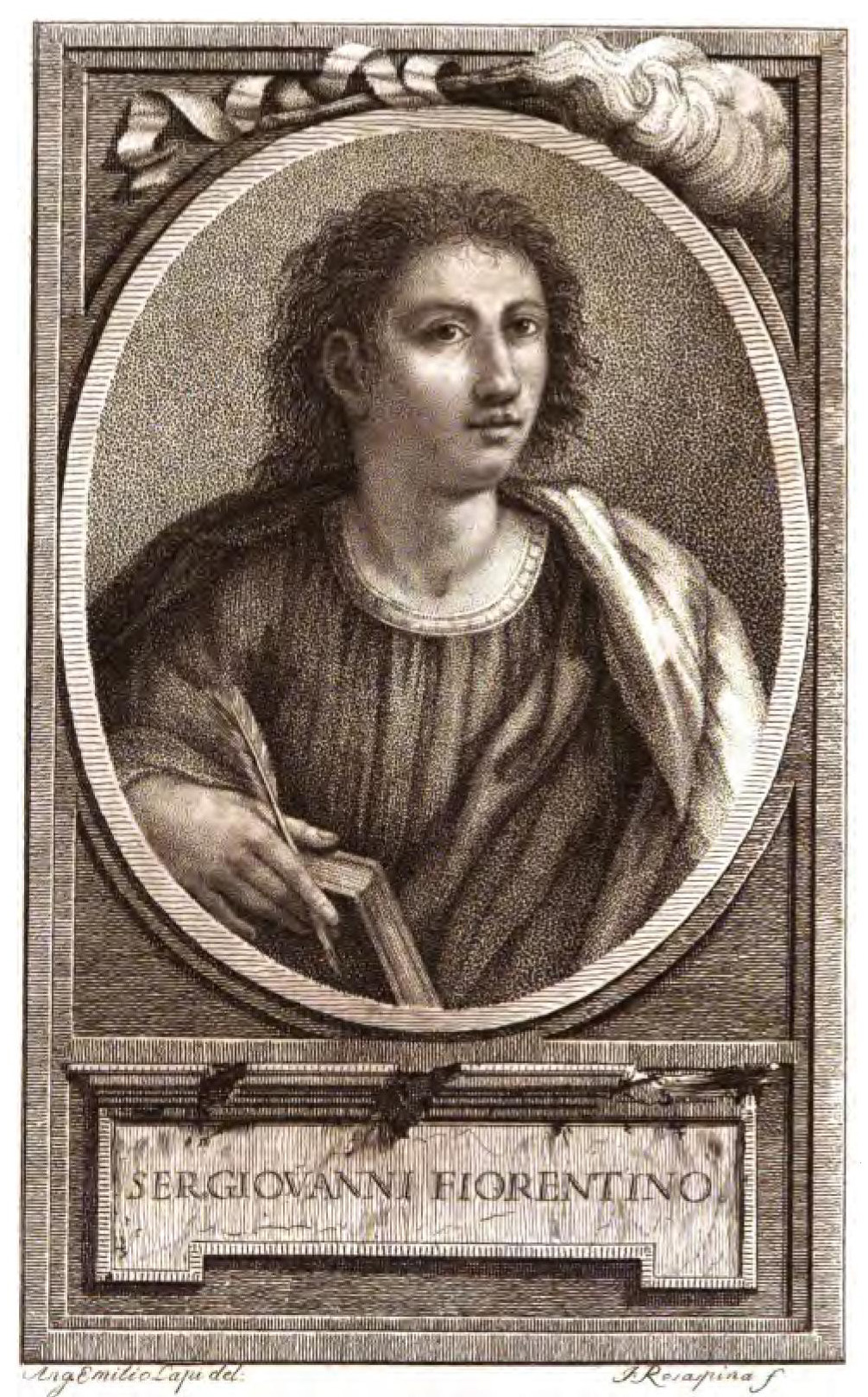
Giovanni Fiorentino

Many poets of the 14th century produced political works. Fazio degli Uberti, the author of Dittamondo, who wrote a Serventese to the lords and people of Italy, a poem on Rome, and a fierce invective against Charles IV, deserves notice, as do Francesco di Vannozzo, Frate Stoppa de' Bostichi and Matteo Frescobaldi. It may be said in general that following the example of Petrarch many writers devoted themselves to patriotic poetry.

From this period also dates that literary phenomenon known under the name of Petrarchism. The Petrarchists, or those who sang of love, imitating Petrarch's manner, were found already in the 14th century. But others treated the same subject with more originality, in a manner that might be called semi-popular. Such were the Ballate of Ser Giovanni Fiorentino, of Franco Sacchetti, of Niccolò Soldanieri, and of Guido and Bindo Donati. Ballate were poems sung to dancing, and we have very many songs for the music of the 14th century. We have already stated that Antonio Pucci versified Villani's Chronicle. It is enough to notice a chronicle of Arezzo in terza rima by Bartolomeo Sinigardi, and the history, also in terza rima, of the journey of Pope Alexander III to Venice, by Pier de Natali. Besides this, every type of subject, whether history, tragedy or husbandry, was treated in verse. Neri di Landocio wrote a life of St Catherine; Jacopo Gradenigo called il Belletto put the Gospels into triplets.

== 15th century: Renaissance humanism ==
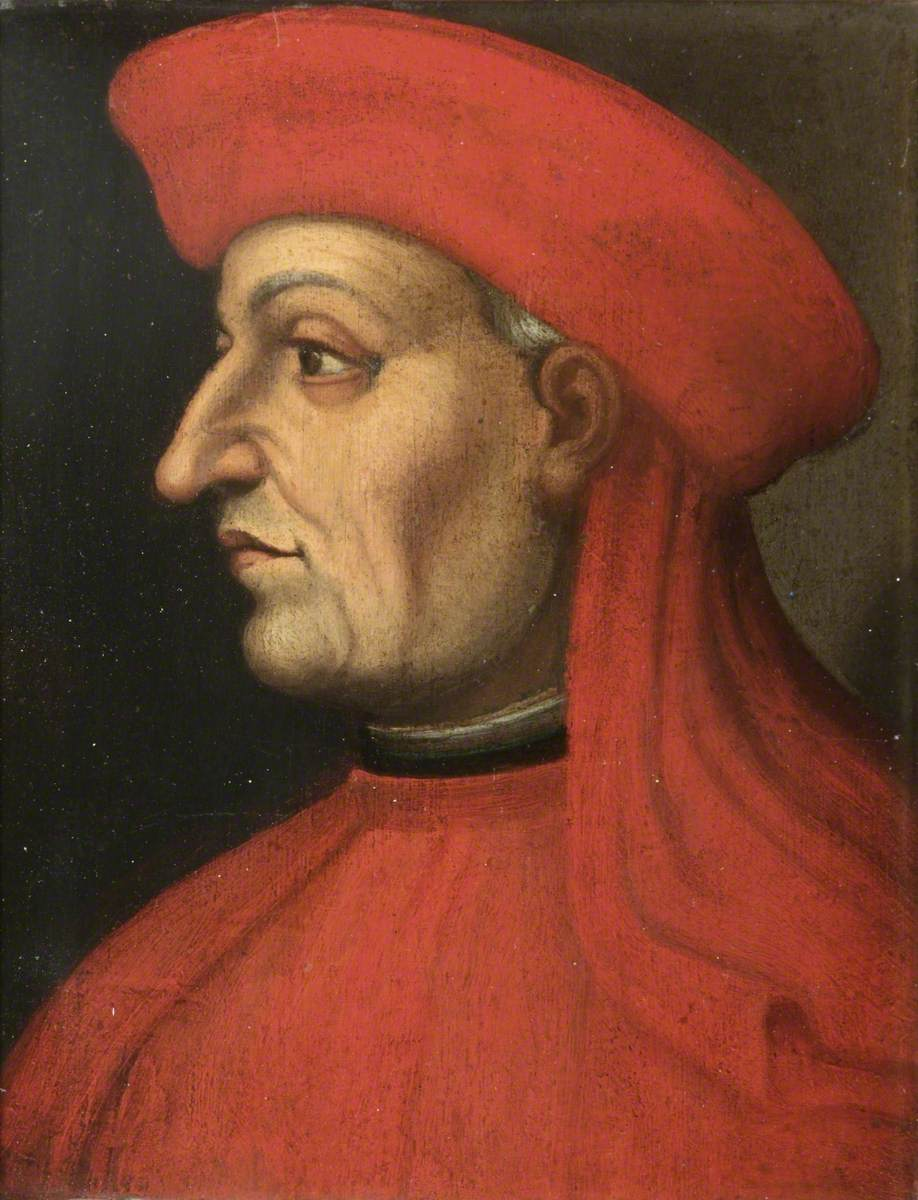
Leonardo Bruni

Renaissance humanism developed during the 14th and the beginning of the 15th centuries, and was a response to the challenge of Mediæval scholastic education, emphasizing practical, pre-professional and -scientific studies. Scholasticism focused on preparing men to be doctors, lawyers or professional theologians, and was taught from approved textbooks in logic, natural philosophy, medicine, law and theology. The main centers of humanism were Florence and Naples.

Rather than train professionals in jargon and strict practice, humanists sought to create a citizenry (including, sometimes, women) able to speak and write with eloquence and clarity. This was to be accomplished through the study of the studia humanitatis, today known as the humanities: grammar, rhetoric, history, poetry and moral philosophy. Early humanists, such as Petrarch, Coluccio Salutati and Leonardo Bruni, were great collectors of antique manuscripts.

In Italy, the humanist educational program won rapid acceptance and, by the mid-15th century, many of the upper classes had received humanist educations. There were five 15th-century humanist popes, one of whom, Aeneas Silvius Piccolomini (Pius II), was a prolific author and wrote a treatise on "The Education of Boys".

=== Literature in the Florence of the Medici ===
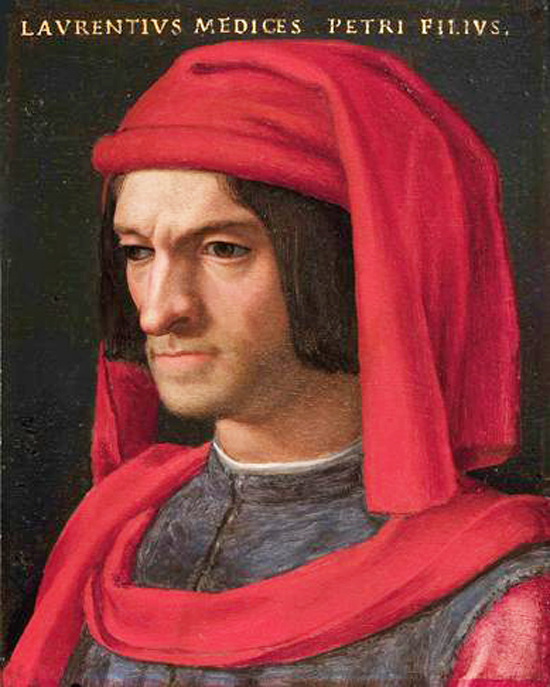
Portrait of Lorenzo de' Medici by Agnolo Bronzino at the Uffizi, Florence

Leone Battista Alberti, a Greek and Latin scholar, wrote in the vernacular, and Vespasiano da Bisticci, while he was constantly absorbed in Greek and Latin manuscripts, wrote the Vite di uomini illustri. Andrea da Barberino wrote the prose of the Reali di Francia, giving a coloring of romanità to the chivalrous romances. Belcari and Girolamo Benivieni returned to the mystic idealism of earlier times.

The influence of Florence on the Renaissance is particularly notable when the city was under Cosimo de' Medici and Lorenzo de' Medici, from 1430 to 1492.

Poliziano, has been praised for artistically combing ancient, modern, popular and classical styles. Polziano is notable for establishing a then new form of scholarly communication in Miscellanea.

A completely new style of poetry arose, the Canto carnascialesco. These were a type of choral songs, which were accompanied by symbolic masquerades, common in Florence at the carnival. They were written in a metre like that of the ballate and were directed by Lorenzo. Bacco ed Arianna is considered by some to be the most famous.

=== Epic: Pulci and Boiardo ===
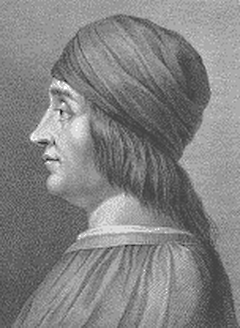
Matteo Boiardo

Italian poetry had been primarily been made up of cantari and romantic poems, such as the Buovo d'Antono. An early proponent of epic poetry was Luigi Pulci, who wrote the Morgante Maggiore. The material of the Morgante is almost completely taken from an obscure chivalrous poem of the 15th century, rediscovered by Pio Rajna.

With a more serious intention Matteo Boiardo, count of Scandiano, wrote his Orlando innamorato, in which he seems to have aspired to embrace the whole range of Carolingian legends; but he did not complete his task. A third romantic poem of the 15th century was the Mambriano by Francesco Bello (Cieco of Ferrara). He drew from the Carolingian cycle, romances of the Round Table, and classical antiquity.

=== Other ===
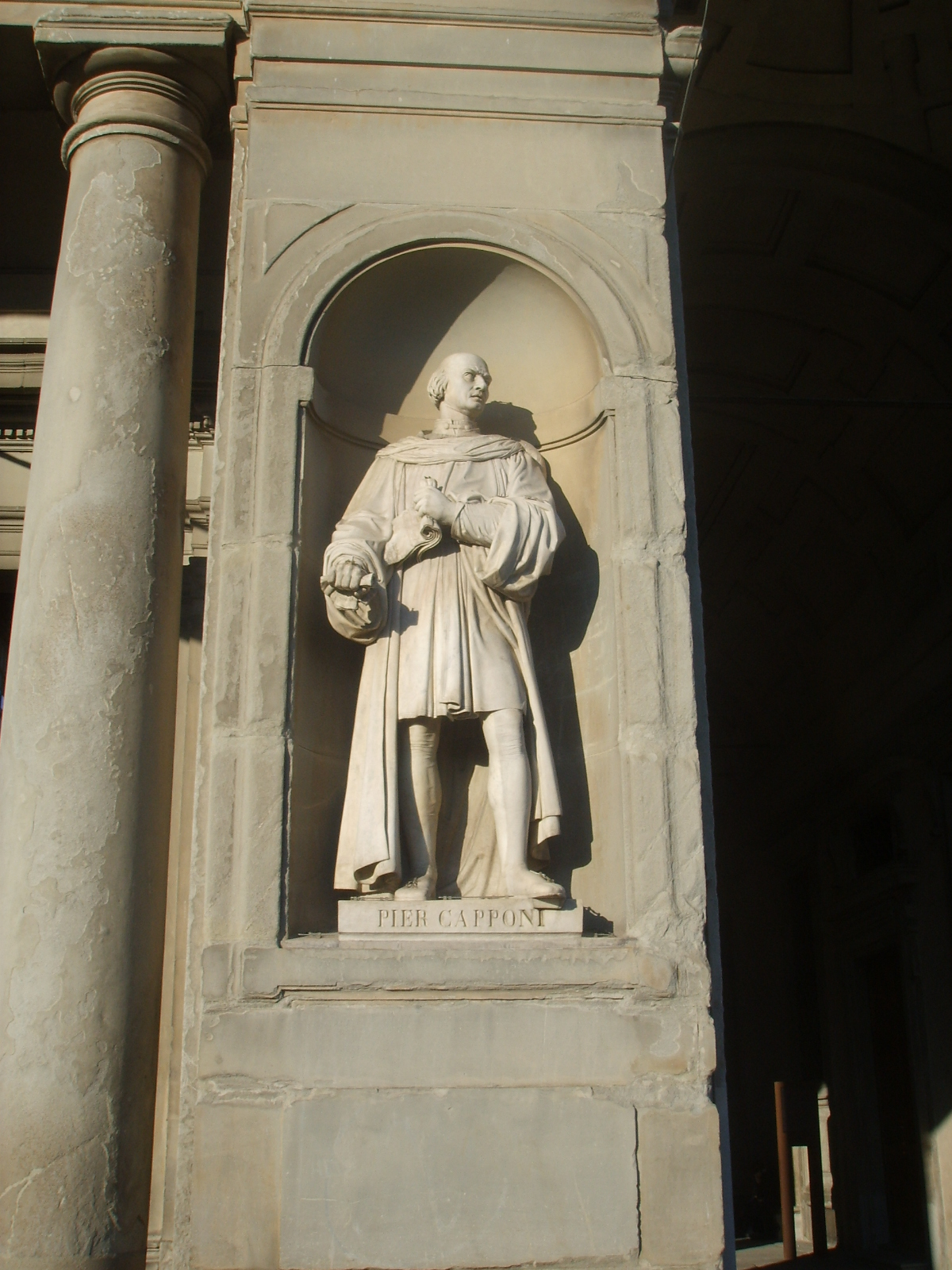
Monument to Piero Capponi in the niches of the courtyard of the Uffizi by Torello Bacci

Gioviano Pontano wrote the history of Naples, Leonardo Bruni of Arezzo that of Florence, in Latin. Bernardino Corio wrote the history of Milan in Italian.

Leonardo da Vinci wrote a treatise on painting, Leone Battista Alberti one on sculpture and architecture.

Piero Capponi, author of the Commentari deli acquisto di Pisa and of the narration of the Tumulto dei Ciompi, belonged to both the 14th and the 15th centuries. Albertino Mussato of Padua wrote in Latin a history of Emperor Henry VII. He then produced a Latin tragedy on Ezzelino da Romano, Henry's imperial vicar in northern Italy, the Eccerinus, which was probably not represented on the stage.

Drama attached itself to certain popular festivities that were usually held in honor of St John the Baptist, patron saint of the city. The Sacra Rappresentazione is the development of the medieval Mistero (mystery play). Although it belonged to popular poetry, some of its authors were literary men. From the 15th century, some element of the comic-profane found its way into the Sacra Rappresentazione. From its Biblical and legendary conventionalism Poliziano emancipated himself in his Orfeo, which, although in its exterior form belonging to the sacred representations, yet substantially detaches itself from them in its contents and in the artistic element introduced.

== 16th century: the High Renaissance ==
Baldassare Castiglione. Portrait by Raphael.

The fundamental characteristic of the literary epoch following that of the Renaissance is that it perfected itself in every type of art, in particular uniting the essentially Italian character of its language with the classicism of style. This period lasted from about 1494 to about 1560—1494 being when Charles VIII descended into Italy, marking the beginning of Italy's foreign domination and political decadence. Literary activity that appeared from the end of the 15th century to the middle of the 16th century was the product of the political and social conditions of an earlier age.

=== Baldassare Castiglione ===
Baldassare Castiglione wrote Il Cortegiano or The Book of the Courtier, a courtesy book dealing with questions of the etiquette and morality of the courtier. Published in 1528, it was very influential in 16th-century European court circles. The Book of the Courtier is a lengthy philosophical dialogue on the topic of what constitutes an ideal courtier or (in the third chapter) court lady, worthy to befriend and advise a Prince or political leader. Inspired by the Spanish court during his time as Ambassador of the Holy See (1524–1529), Castiglione set the narrative of the book in his years as a courtier in his native Duchy of Urbino. The book quickly became enormously popular and was assimilated by its readers into the genre of prescriptive courtesy books or books of manners, dealing with issues of etiquette, self-presentation, and morals, particularly at princely, or royal courts, books such as Giovanni Della Casa's Galateo (1558) and Stefano Guazzo's The civil conversation (1574). The Book of the Courtier was much more than that, however, having the character of a drama, an open-ended philosophical discussion, and an essay. It has also been seen as a veiled political allegory.

=== Science of history: Machiavelli and Guicciardini ===
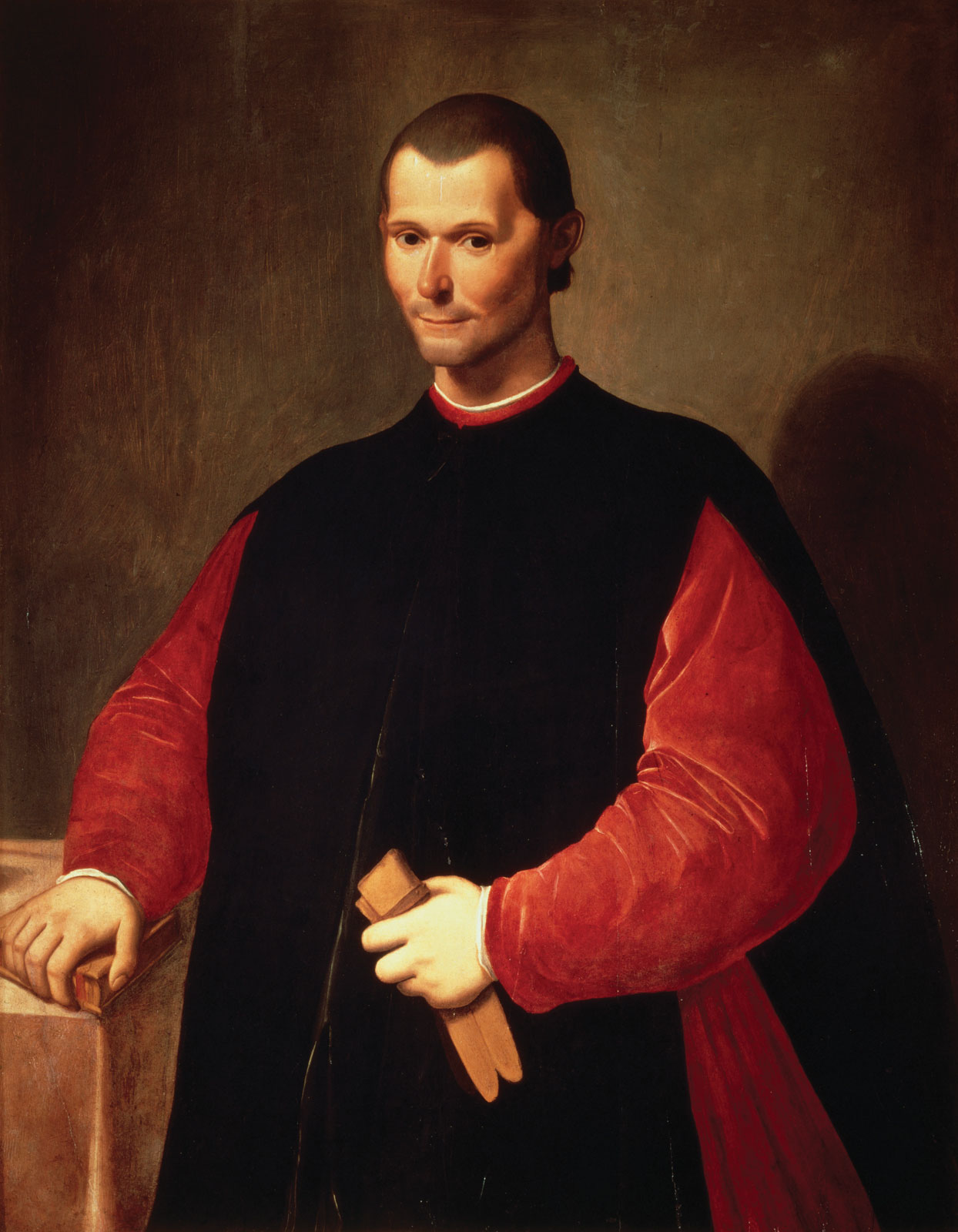
Portrait of Niccolò Machiavelli by Santi di Tito

Niccolò Machiavelli and Francesco Guicciardini were the chief originators of the science of history. Machiavelli's principal works are the Istorie fiorentine, the Discorsi sulla prima deca di Tito Livio, the Arte della guerra and the Principe. His merit consists in having emphasized the experimental side of the study of political action by having observed facts, studied histories and drawn principles from them. His history is sometimes inexact in facts; it is rather a political than a historical work.

Guicciardini was very observant and endeavoured to reduce his observations to a science. His Storia d'Italia, which extends from the death of Lorenzo de' Medici to 1534, is full of political wisdom, is skillfully arranged in its parts, gives a lively picture of the character of the persons it treats of, and is written in a grand style. Machiavelli and Guicciardini may be considered distinguished historians as well as originators of the science of history founded on observation.

Inferior to them were Jacopo Nardi (a just and faithful historian and a virtuous man, who defended the rights of Florence against the Medici before Charles V), Benedetto Varchi, Giambattista Adriani, Bernardo Segni, and, outside Tuscany, Camillo Porzio, who related the Congiura de baroni and the history of Italy from 1547 to 1552; Angelo di Costanzo, Pietro Bembo, Paolo Paruta, and others.

=== Ludovico Ariosto ===
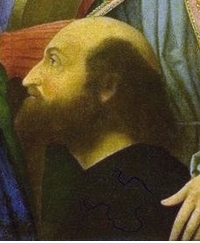
Ludovico Ariosto, detail of vinting Madonna with Saints Joseph, John, Catherine, Louis of Toulouse and Lodovico Ariosto by Vincenzo Catena, 1512

Ludovico Ariosto's Orlando furioso was a continuation of Boiardo's Innamorato. His characteristic is that he assimilated the romance of chivalry into the style and models of classicism. Romantic Ariosto was an artist only for the love of his art; his epic.

=== Pietro Bembo ===
Pietro Bembo was an influential figure in the development of the Italian language, specifically Tuscan, as a literary medium, and his writings assisted in the 16th century revival of interest in the works of Petrarch. As a writer, Bembo attempted to restore some of the legendary "effect" that ancient Greek had on its hearers, but in Tuscan Italian instead. He held as his model and as the highest example of poetic expression ever achieved in Italian, the work of Petrarch and Boccaccio, two 14th-century writers he assisted in bringing back into fashion.

In the Prose della volgar lingua, he set Petrarch up as the perfect model and discussed verse composition in detail.

=== Torquato Tasso ===
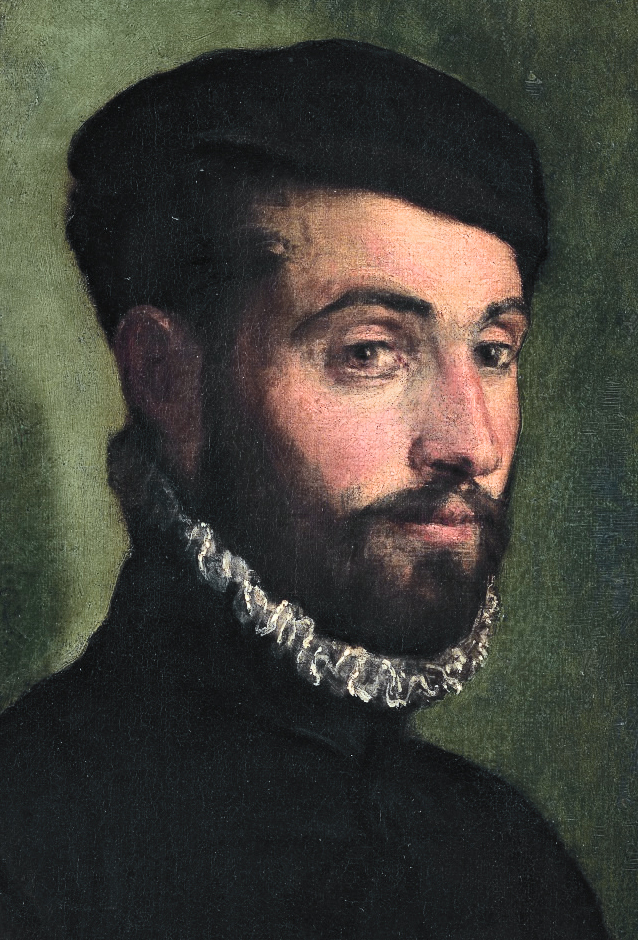
Portrait of Torquato Tasso by Jacopo Bassano

The historians of Italian literature are in doubt whether Torquato Tasso should be placed in the period of the highest development of the Renaissance, or whether he should form a period by himself, intermediate between that and the one following. In Rinaldo, he tried to reconcile the Aristotelian rules with the variety of Ariosto. He later wrote the Aminta, a pastoral drama. He explains his intentions in the three Discorsi, written while he composed the Gerusalemme: he would choose a great and wonderful subject, not so ancient as to have lost all interest, nor so recent as to prevent the poet from embellishing it with invented circumstances. He would treat it rigorously according to the rules of the unity of action observed in Greek and Latin poems but with a far greater variety and splendour of episodes. The Gerusalemme is the best heroic poem of Italy. As regards the style, however, although Tasso studiously endeavoured to keep close to the classical models, he makes excessive use of metaphor, of antithesis, of far-fetched conceits; and it is especially from this point of view that some historians have placed Tasso in the literary period generally known under the name of Secentismo, and that others, more moderate in their criticism, have said that he prepared the way for it.

=== Giovanni Battista Guarini ===
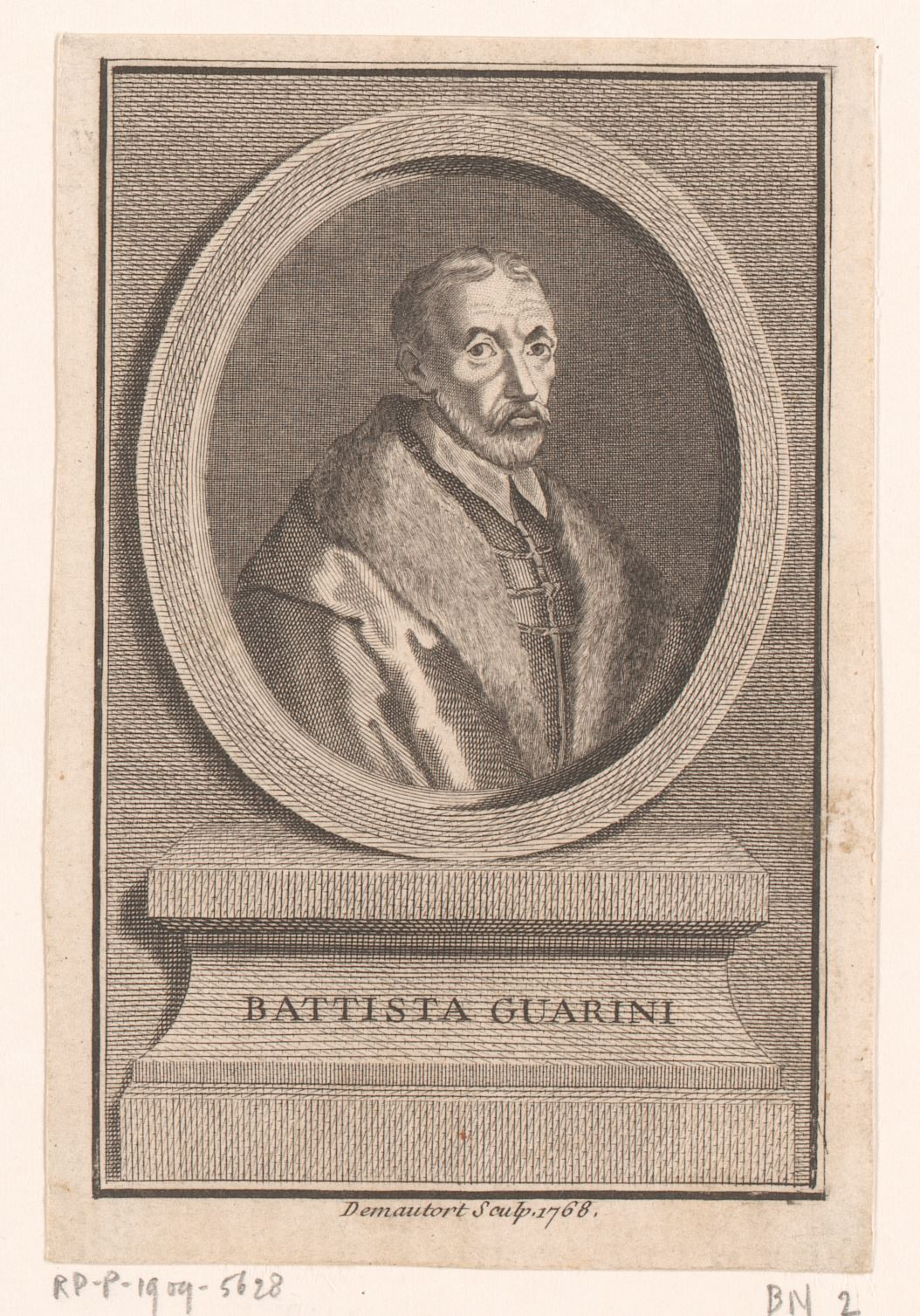
Giovanni Battista Guarini

Among the most influential authors of Late Renaissance Italy, the Ferrarese poet Giovanni Battista Guarini is best known for the immensely popular pastoral drama Il pastor fido (1589-1602). Written in emulation of Tasso's Aminta, it had a considerable vogue throughout Europe in the 17th century, and was translated many times, notably in English by Sir Richard Fanshawe in 1647. Guarini also wrote an influential defence of tragicomedy, the Compendio della poesia tragicomica (1601) and an important collection of lyrics (1598).

=== Minor writers ===
Portrait of Giovanni della Casa by Jacopo Pontormo

Meanwhile, there was an attempt at the historical epic. Gian Giorgio Trissino of Vicenza composed a poem called Italia liberata dai Goti, on the campaigns of Belisarius; he said that he had forced himself to observe all the rules of Aristotle, and that he had imitated Homer. Monsignore Giovanni Guidiccioni of Lucca in sonnets expressed his grief for the sad state of his country. Other lyric poets of the period include Francesco Molza, Giovanni della Casa and Pietro Bembo, and women Vittoria Colonna, Veronica Gambara, Tullia d'Aragona, and Giulia Gonzaga. Isabella di Morra is a singular example of female poetry of the time.

Many tragedies were written in the 16th century, but they are all weak. The first to occupy the tragic stage was Trissino with his Sofonisba. The Oreste and the Rosmunda of Giovanni di Bernardo Rucellai were no better, nor Luigi Alamanni's translation of Antigone. Sperone Speroni in his Canace and Giraldi Cintio in his Orbecche tried to become innovators in tragic literature, but provoked criticisms of grotesquerie and debate over the role of decorum. They were often seen as inferior to the Torrismondo of Torquato Tasso, especially remarkable for the choruses, reminiscent of the Greek tragedies.

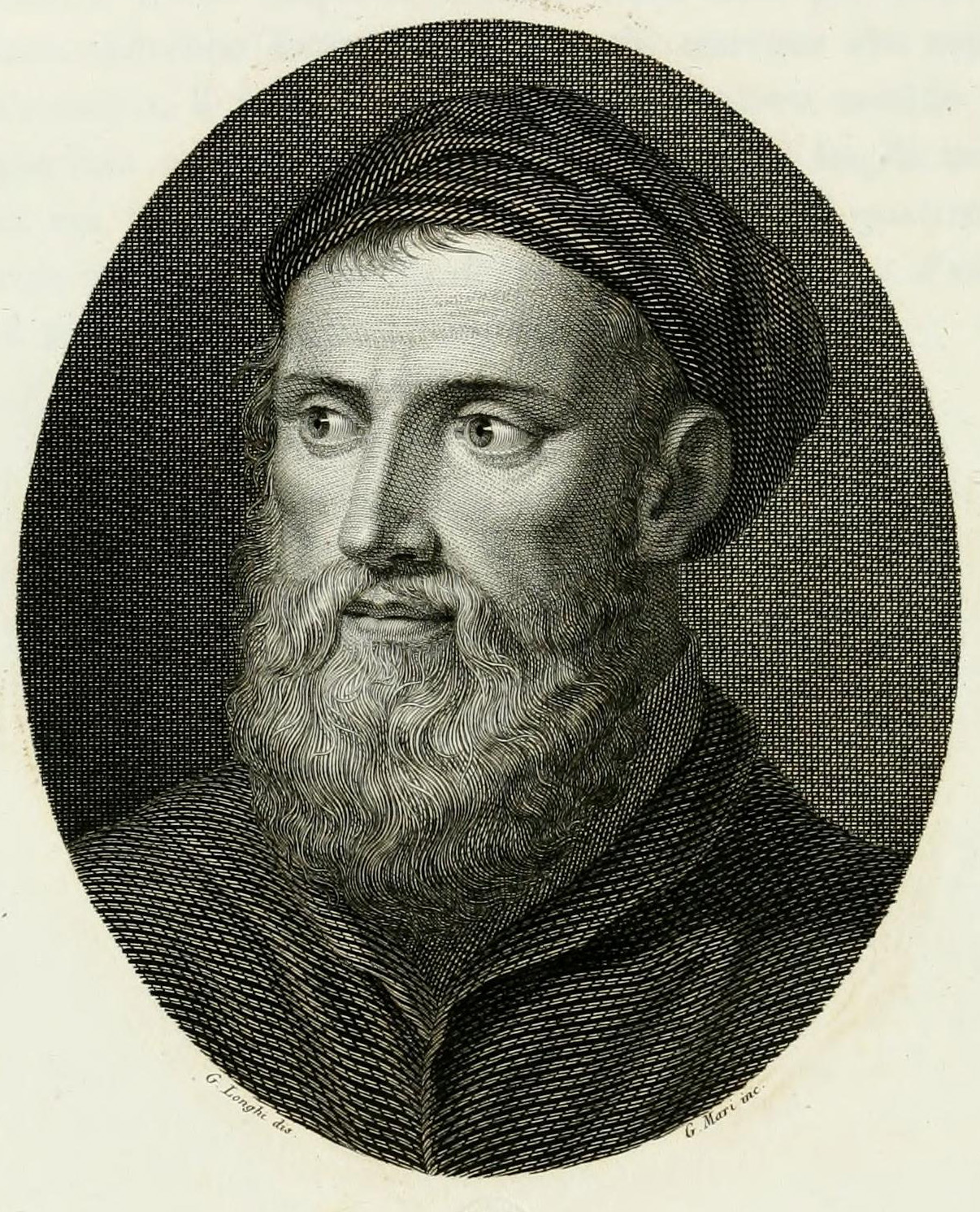
Portrait of Francesco Berni by Giuseppe Marri

The Italian comedy of the 16th century was almost entirely modelled on Latin comedy. They were almost always alike in the plot. Thus the Lucidi of Agnolo Firenzuola, and the Vecchio amoroso of Donato Giannotti were modelled on comedies by Plautus, as were the Sporta by Giambattista Gelli, the Marito by Lodovico Dolce, and others. The best comedy writers were Machiavelli, Ariosto, and Giovanni Maria Cecchi, and possibly Pietro Aretino. The 15th century included humorous poetry. Antonio Cammelli, surnamed the Pistoian, is especially deserving of notice, because of his pungent bonhomie, as Sainte-Beuve called it. But it was Francesco Berni who and satire, carried this type of literature to perfection in the 16th century. From him, the style has been called "Bernesque poetry". Bernesque poetry is the clearest reflection of that religious and moral scepticism that was a characteristic of Italian social life in the 16th century, and that showed itself in most of the works of that period—a scepticism that stopped the religious Reformation in Italy, and which in its turn was an effect of historical conditions. Pure satirists, on the other hand, were Antonio Vinciguerra, Lodovico Alamanni and Ariosto, the last superior to the others for the Attic elegance of his style.

In the 16th century, there were not a few didactic works. In his poem Le Api Giovanni di Bernardo Rucellai approaches the perfection of Virgil. The most important didactic work, however, is Castiglione's Cortigiano, in which he imagines a discussion in the palace of the dukes of Urbino between knights and ladies as to what gifts a perfect courtier requires. This book is valuable as an illustration of the intellectual and moral state of the highest Italian society in the first half of the 16th century.

Of the novelists of the 16th century, the two most important were Grazzini, and Matteo Bandello. Bandello was a Dominican friar and a bishop, but that notwithstanding his novels were very loose in subject, and he often held up the ecclesiastics of his time to ridicule.

Among the very numerous translations of the time those of the Aeneid and of the Pastorals of Longus the Sophist by Annibale Caro are still famous; as are also the translations of Ovid's Metamorphoses by Giovanni Andrea dell' Anguillara, of Apuleius's The Golden Ass by Firenzuola, and of Plutarch's Lives and Moralia by Marcello Adriani.

== 17th century: the Baroque period ==
The Treaty of Cateau-Cambrésis in 1559 ushered in centuries of foreign domination over Italy. This period is known in the history of Italian literature as the Secentismo. Its writers deployed complex, far-fetched comparisons, paradoxes, and paralogical statements (acutezze) in order to exhibit the writer's genius and ingenuity (ingegno), and provoke wonder (meraviglia) in the reader.

=== Literary theory ===
The main theorist of Italian Secentismo was the philosopher Emanuele Tesauro. His main work was Il cannocchiale aristotelico, first published in 1654 and reprinted at least ten times in the 17th century. Developing ideas adumbrated in Renaissance poetics, and using the Aristotle of the Rhetoric rather than of the Poetics, Tesauro builds up a vast theory of metaphor and concettismo. His theory depends on a distinction between intelletto and ingegno: intelletto apprehends facts and communicates them via literal signs directly and unadorned to the mind; ingegno apprehends facts and transforms them, through processes of analogy and lateral thinking, into pleasing, witty rhetorical conceits. Tesauro is conscious of the dangers of slippage between truth and language, but he appreciates the sensuous and intellectual pleasure and wonder that non-literal, non-transparent words and signs can create. For him, all language is inherently metaphorical in that it involves transference from thought to the senses. The role of ingegno is to investigate the hidden connection between all things, treating the world as a storehouse of potentially marvellous analogies. Metaphor is central to this metamorphosing process; and Tesauro shows how in kaleidoscopic fashion one metaphor can generate an infinite number of others in such a way that the scope of poetic and rhetorical analogy is extended, in theory, as never before. In this way he subverts Aristotle while paying lip-service to him, and opens up a new literary world which is akin to the new scientific and geographical worlds of the early 17th century.

=== Marinism ===
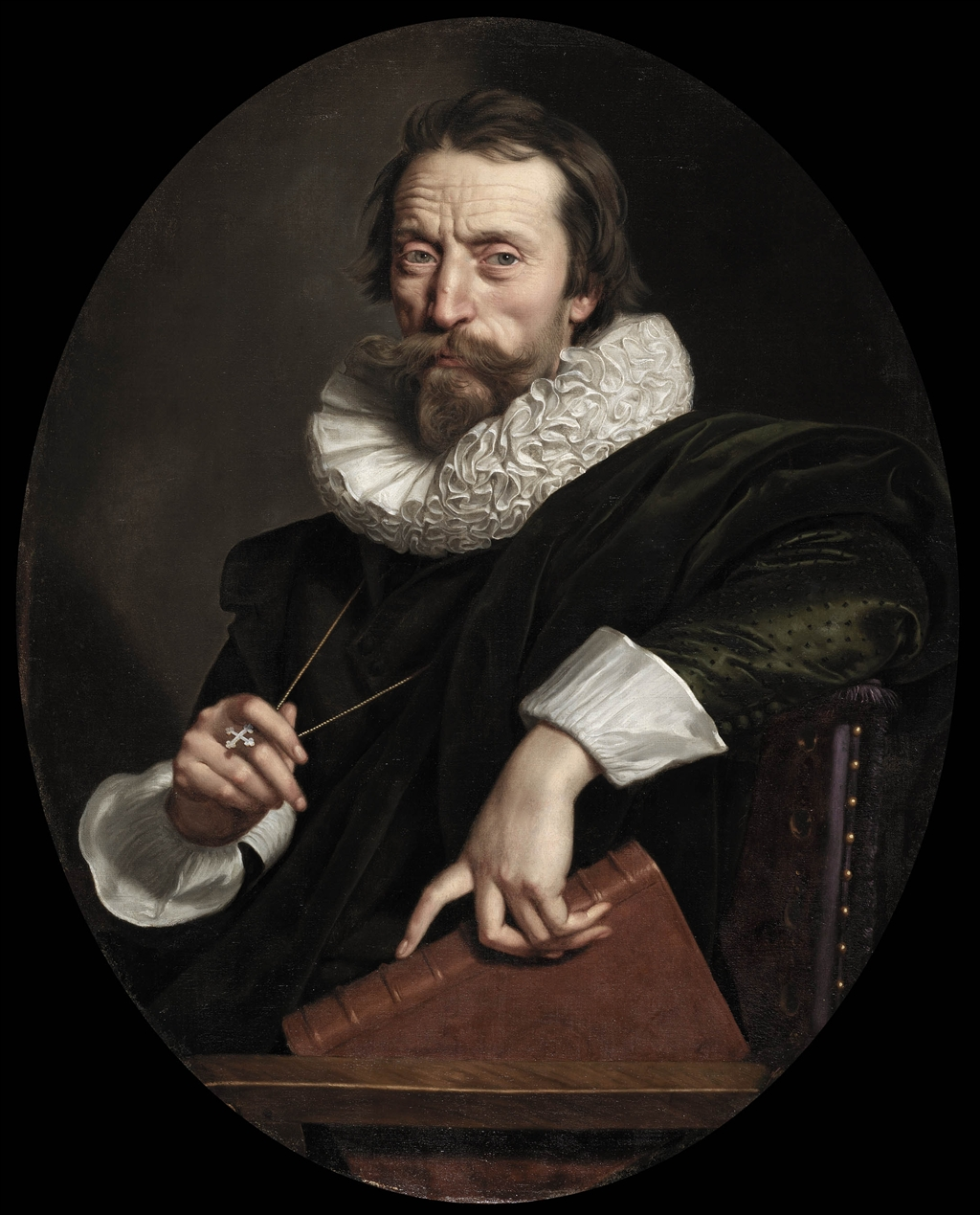
Portrait of Giambattista Marino by Frans Pourbus the Younger

At the head of the school of the Secentisti was Giambattista Marino, especially known for his epic poem, L'Adone. Marino himself, as he declared in the Preface to La lira, wished to be a new leader and model for other poets. Second, he wished to surprise and shock the reader through the marvellous (meraviglioso) and the unusual (peregrino). The qualities he and his followers most valued were ingegno and acutezza, as demonstrated through far-fetched metaphors and conceits, often ones that would assault the reader's senses. This meant being ready, in fact eager, to break literary rules and precepts. Marino and his followers mixed tradition and innovation: they worked with existing poetic forms, notably the sonnet, the sestina, the canzone, the madrigal, and less frequently the ottava rima, but developed new, more fluid structures and line lengths. They also treated hallowed themes (love, woman, nature), but they made the senses and sensuality the dominant element. The passions, which had attracted the attention of Paduan writers and theorists in the mid-16th century as well as of Tasso, take centre stage, and are depicted in extreme forms in representations of subjects such as martyrdom, sacrifice, heroic grandeur, and abysmal existential fear. The Marinists also take up new themes—notably the visual and musical arts and indoor scenes—with a new repertoire of references embracing modern scientific advances, other specialized branches of knowledge, and exotic locations and animals. There are similarities with Tasso, but the balance between form and content in Tasso is deliberately unbalanced by Marino and his followers, who very often forget all concerns about unity in their poems (witness the Adone). The most striking difference, however, is the intensified role of metaphor. Marino and his followers looked for metaphors that would arrest the reader by suggesting a likeness between two apparently disparate things, thus producing startling metamorphoses, conceits (concetti), and far-fetched images that send sparks flying as they create a friction between two apparently diverse objects. The extent to which this new metaphorical freedom reveals a new world is still open to critical debate. In some ways it seems to make poetry a form of intellectual game or puzzle; in others it suggests new ways of perceiving and describing reality, parallel to the mathematical measures employed by Galileo and his followers in the experimental sciences.

Almost all the poets of the 17th century were more or less influenced by Marinism. Many secentisti felt the influence of another poet, Gabriello Chiabrera. Enamoured of the Greeks, he made new metres, especially in imitation of Pindar, treating of religious, moral, historical, and amatory subjects. Carlo Alessandro Guidi was the chief representative of an early Pindarizing current based on imitation of Chiabrera as second only to Petrarch in Italian poetry. He was extolled by both Gravina and Crescimbeni, who edited his poetry (1726), and imitated by Parini. Alfieri attributed his own self-discovery to the power of Guidi's verse. Fulvio Testi was another major exponent of the Hellenizing strand of Baroque classicism, combining Horatianism with the imitation of Anacreon and Pindar. His most important and interesting writings are not, however, his lyrics (only collected in 1653), but his extensive correspondence, which is a major document of Baroque politics and letters.

=== Arcadia ===
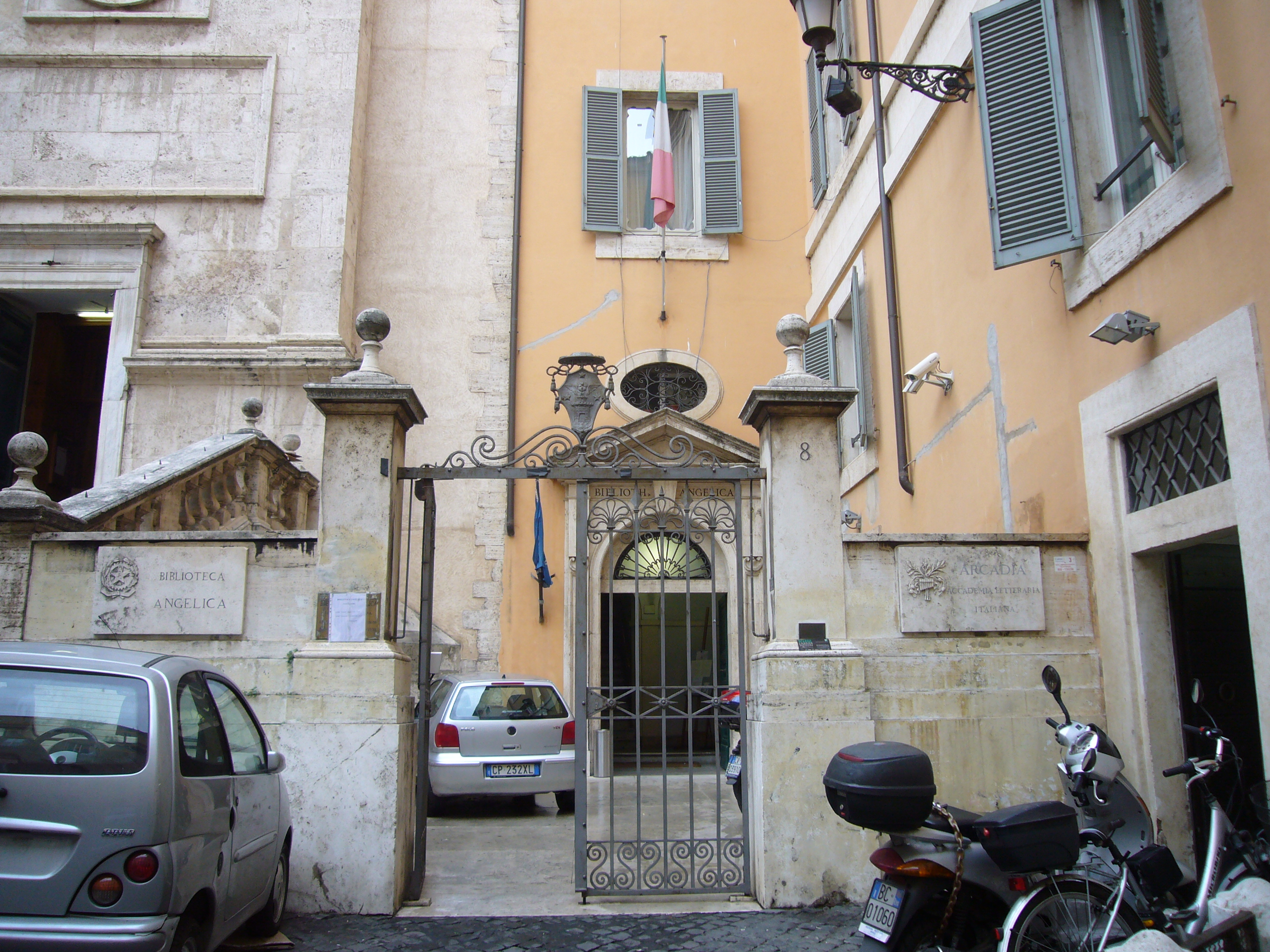
The Accademia dell' Arcadia headquarters in Piazza Sant'Agostino in Rome

Marino's work, with its sensual metaphorical language and its non-epic structure and morality, stirred up a debate over the rival claims of classical purity and sobriety on the one hand and the excesses of marinism on the other. The debate went on until it was finally decided in favour of the classical by the Accademia dell'Arcadia, whose view of the matter prevailed in Italian criticism well into the 20th century. The Accademia dell'Arcadia was founded by Giovanni Mario Crescimbeni and Gian Vincenzo Gravina in 1690. The Arcadia was so called because its chief aim was to imitate the simplicity of the ancient shepherds who were supposed to have lived in Arcadia in the golden age. The poems of the Arcadians are made up of sonnets, madrigals, canzonette and blank verse. The one who most distinguished himself among the sonneteers was Felice Zappi. Among the authors of songs, Paolo Rolli was illustrious. Carlo Innocenzo Frugoni was the best known. The members of the Arcadia were almost exclusively men, but at least one woman, Maria Antonia Scalera Stellini, was elected on poetical merits. Vincenzo da Filicaja had a lyric talent, particularly in the songs about Vienna besieged by the Turks.

=== Baroque novel ===
During the 17th century, Italy witnessed the development of the Baroque novel, which Alberto Asor Rosa has suggested came about through the secularization of chivalric poetry and the increasingly literary character of the novella. There were a few developments in other directions. Giovanni Ambrogio Marini presented an idealization of aristocratic life in his highly successful Calloandro fedele (1640–1), and, in a radical move, Girolamo Brusoni's Trilogia di Glisomiro (1657–62) replaced the lives and loves of the aristocracy with those of the contemporary bourgeoisie. Italy in the 17th century produced several distinguished novelists, notably Giovanni Francesco Biondi, Bernardo Morando, Luca Assarino and Pace Pasini. Biondi wrote a celebrated trilogy of novels—L'Eromena (1624), La donzella desterrada (1627), and Il Coralbo ( 1632). Morando's Rosalinda (1650) enjoyed over twenty reprints and was translated into French and English. Luca Assarino's extremely successful novels included La Stratonica (1635), which was translated into French, English, and German, and L'Almerinda (1640), later expanded and completely reworked in I giuochi di fortuna (1655). Pace Pasini's L'historia del cavalier perduto (1644), which combines chivalric, picaresque, and political themes, was likely a source for Alessandro Manzoni's The Betrothed.

Giovanni Paolo Marana's Letters Writ by a Turkish Spy (1684) was one of the first epistolary novels. The work became one of the best-sellers of late seventeenth-century and influenced Montesquieu in writing the Persian Letters (1721). Daniel Defoe wrote an unofficial sequel to Marana's work, A Continuation of Letters Writ by a Turkish Spy (1718).

=== Baroque theatre ===
Federico Della Valle was the most important Italian Baroque dramatist. He worked at the court of Charles Emanuel I of Savoy in Turin, and was active also in Milan. He has been rediscovered only in the present century. He composed a youthful tragicomedy, Adelonda di Frigia (publ. 1629), but his best plays are tragedies on religious themes, Judit (1627) and Ester (1627), on Biblical subjects, and La reina di Scotia (1628) on the fate of Mary Stuart, who is presented as a Catholic martyr. They show the dynamic influence of religion on conduct, not through abstract rhetoric but with real poetic feeling for the tragic in human situations. The direct forcefulness of his writing is little touched by the baroque grandiloquence of the Seicento.

Like other tragedies of the period Della Valle's plays followed the classical model. A few playwrights revolted against the classical rules of unity of place, time, and action, and conspicuous among the new kind of plays produced was the Cromuele (1671) of Girolamo Graziani, a powerful if unhistorical presentation of Oliver Cromwell whose utterances are full of Machiavellian statecraft.

=== Baroque satire ===
Anti-Spanish satire begins with Trajano Boccalini's Ragguagli di Parnaso, and continues with Fulvio Testi's Filippiche. The Renaissance epic becomes satire in Alessandro Tassoni's La secchia rapita, which reduces a real dispute of 1393 between Guelphs and Ghibellines to farce. More wide-ranging was the Neapolitan Italian painter and poet Salvator Rosa, whose seven long satires follow in the footsteps of Ariosto. Arcadians such as Gian Vincenzo Gravina and Paolo Rolli used satire to attack the excesses of Marino's followers; Rolli also edited an anthology of Italian satire in London. On stage, Carlo Maria Maggi's Milanese dialect satires ushered in a genre continued by the Sienese playwright Girolamo Gigli.

=== Philosophical literature: Tommaso Campanella ===
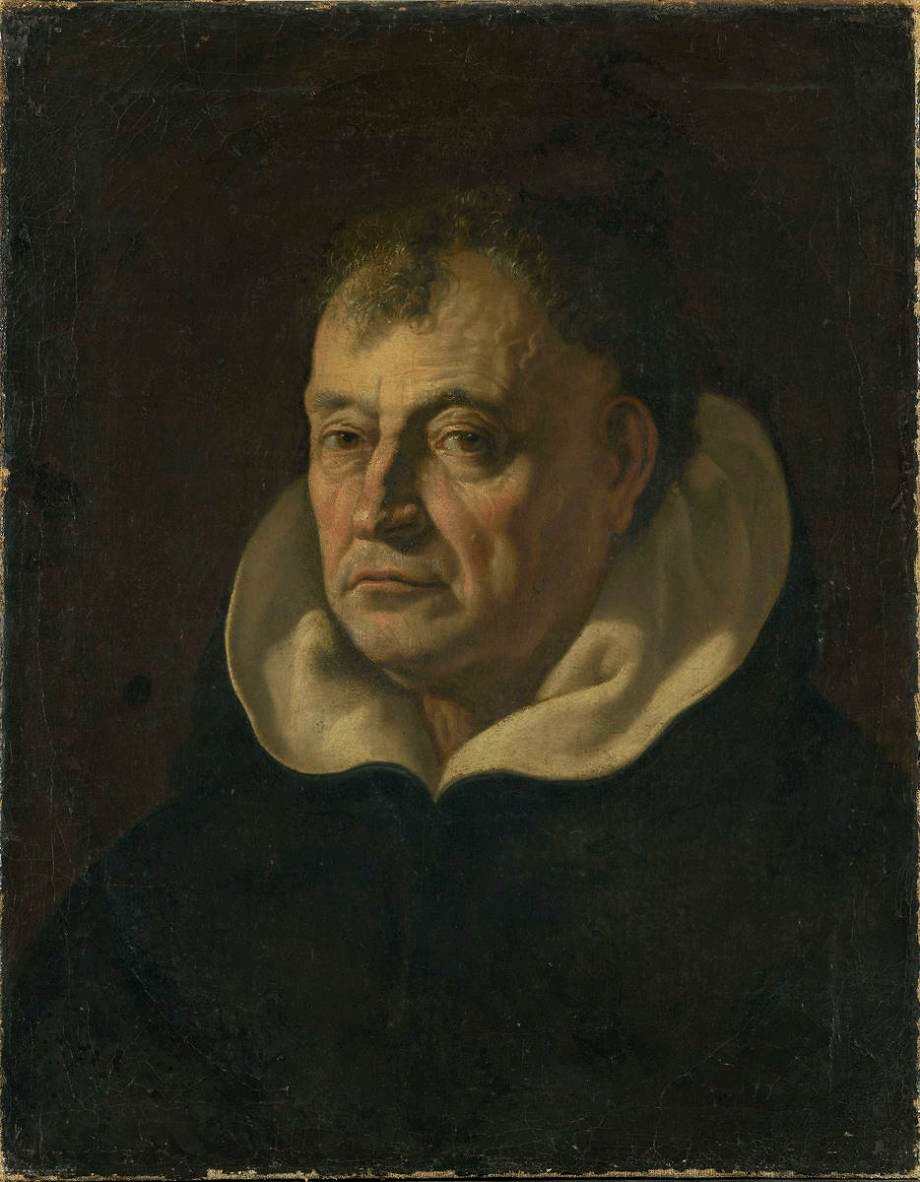
Portrait of Tommaso Campanella by Francesco Cozza

The philosopher, theologian, astrologer, and poet Tommaso Campanella is an interesting albeit isolated figure in 17th-century Italian literature. His Poesie, published in 1622, consist of eighty-nine poems in various metrical forms. Some are autobiographical, but all are stamped with a seriousness and directness which bypasses the literary fashions of his day. He wrote in Latin on dialectics, rhetoric, poetics, and historiography, as well as the Italian Del senso delle cose e della magia, composed in 1604 and published in 1620. In this fascinating work, influenced by the teachings of Bernardino Telesio, Campanella imagines the world as a living statue of God, in which all aspects of reality have meaning and sense. With its animism and sensuality this vision foreshadows in many ways the views of Daniello Bartoli and Tesauro. Campanella's theological work, closely connected with his philosophical writings, includes the Atheismus triumphatus and the thirty-volume Theologia (1613–24). His most famous work, and the one that brings together all his interests, is La città del sole, first drafted in 1602 in Italian and then later translated into Latin in 1613 and 1631. In it a Genoese sailor from Christopher Columbus' crew describes the ideal state of the City of the Sun ruled over in both temporal and spiritual matters by the Prince Priest, called Sun or Metaphysician. Under him there are three ministers: Power (concerned with war and peace), Wisdom (concerned with science and art, all written down in one book), and Love (concerned with procreation and education of the citizens of the Sun). The life of the citizens is based on a system of communism: all property is held publicly, there are no families, no rights of inheritance, no marriage, and sexual relations are regulated by the state. Everyone has his or her function in the society, and certain duties are required of all citizens. Education is the perfect training of the mind and the body, and it is radically opposed to the bookish and academic culture of Renaissance Italy: the objects of study should be not ‘dead things’ but nature and the mathematical and physical laws that govern the physical world. There are links here with the burgeoning modernism of the Querelle des anciens et des modernes, and with the methods and scientific aspirations of Galileo, whom Campanella defended in writing in 1616.

=== Science ===
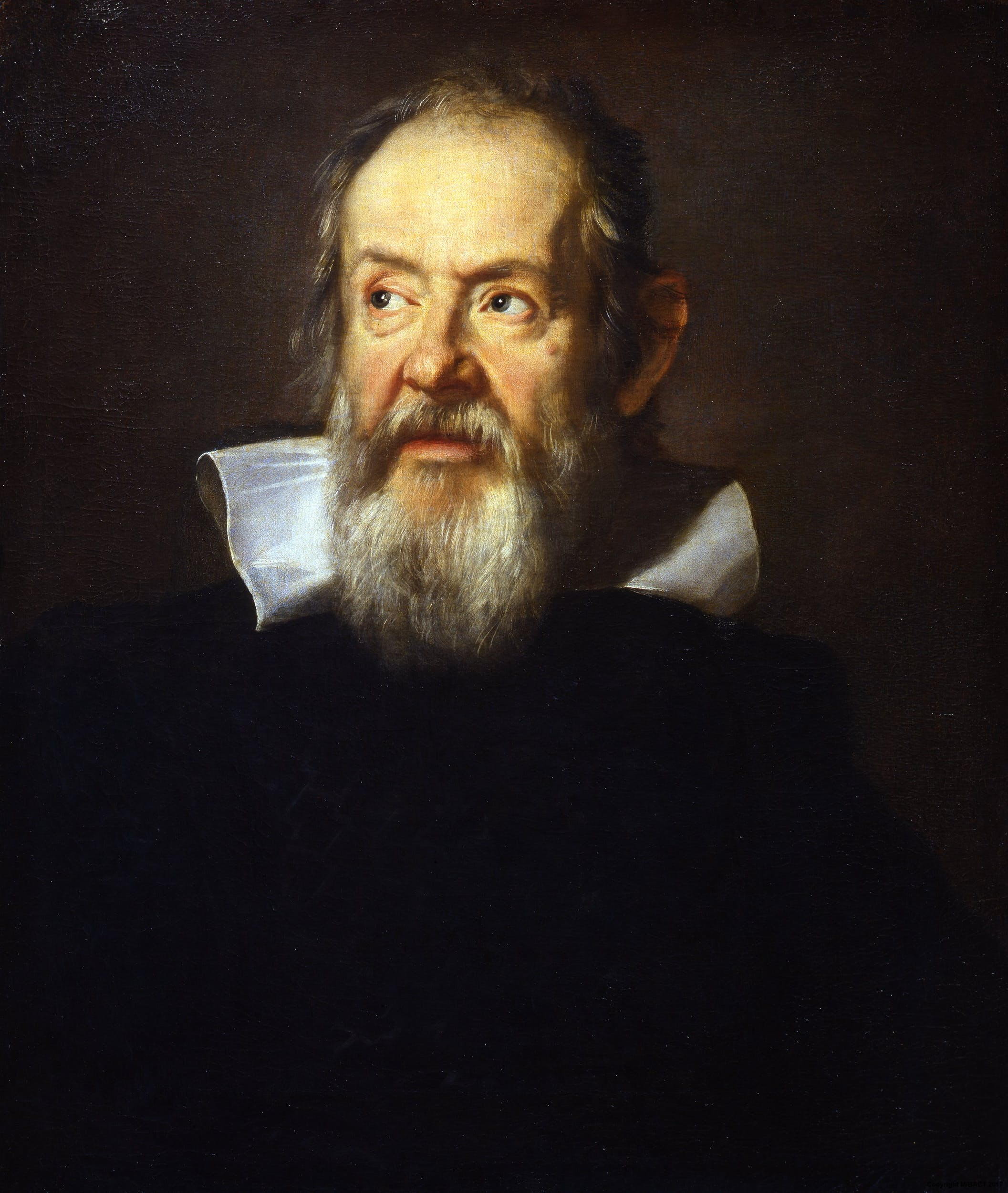
Portrait of Galileo Galilei by Justus Sustermans

The Lyncean Academy, the first and most famous of the scientific academies in Italy, was founded in 1603 in Rome by Federico Cesi. The academy dedicated its activities to the study of the natural and mathematical sciences and to the use of the experimental method associated with Galileo. The European dimension of the Academy was characteristic of the founders' foresight and perspective: elections were made of foreign corresponding members, a practice that continues to this day. Members included Claudio Achillini, Pietro Della Valle, Galileo (from 1611), Francesco Sforza Pallavicino, Giambattista Della Porta (from 1610 ), and Filippo Salviati. Their work involved the large-scale publishing of scientific results based on direct observation, including Galileo's work on the moon's surface (1610) and his Assayer (1623). The Academy defended Galileo at his trial in 1616, and played a crucial role in the early diffusion and promotion of his method.

The successor of the Lynceans was the Accademia del Cimento, founded in Florence in 1657. Never as organized as the Lynceans had been, it began as a meeting of disciples of Galileo, all of whom were interested in the progress of the experimental sciences. Official status came in 1657, when cardinal Leopoldo de’ Medici sponsored the academy’s foundation. With the motto ‘provando e riprovando’, the members, including Carlo Roberto Dati, Lorenzo Magalotti, and Vincenzo Viviani, set seriously about their work. Unlike Galileo, who tackled large-scale issues, the Cimento worked on a smaller scale. One of the legacies of the Cimento is the elegant Italian prose, capable of describing things accurately, that characterizes the Saggi di naturali esperienze edited by Magalotti and published in 1667.

Galileo occupied a conspicuous place in the history of letters. A devoted student of Ariosto, he seemed to transfuse into his prose the qualities of that great poet: clear and frank freedom of expression, precision and ease, and at the same time elegance. Paganino Bonafede in the Tesoro dei rustici gave many precepts in agriculture, beginning that type of georgic poetry later fully developed by Luigi Alamanni in his Coltivazione, by Girolamo Baruffaldi in the Canapajo, by Rucellai in Le Api, by Bartolomeo Lorenzi in the Coltivazione de' monti, and by Giambattista Spolverini in the Coltivazione del riso.

== The Age of Reason and Reform ==
In the 18th century, the political condition of Italy began to improve, under Joseph II, Holy Roman Emperor, and his successors. These princes were influenced by philosophers, who in their turn felt the influence of a general movement of ideas at large in many parts of Europe, sometimes called The Enlightenment.

=== History and society: Vico, Muratori and Beccaria ===
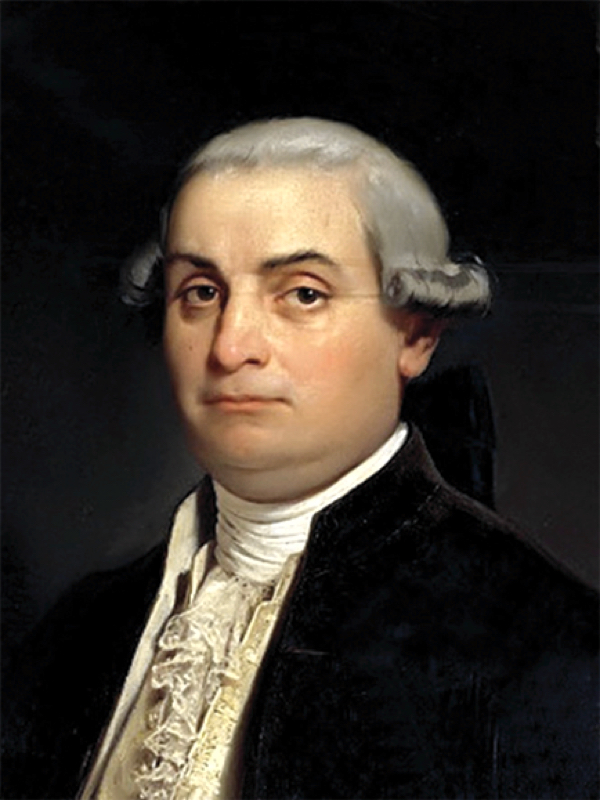
Portrait of Cesare Beccaria by Eliseo Sala

Giambattista Vico showed the awakening of historical consciousness in Italy. In his Scienza nuova, he investigated the laws governing the progress of the human race, and according to which events develop. From the psychological study of man, he tried to infer the comune natura delle nazioni, i.e., the universal laws of history.

Lodovico Antonio Muratori, after having collected in his Rerum Italicarum scriptores the chronicles, biographies, letters and diaries of Italian history from 500 to 1500, and having discussed the most obscure historical questions in the Antiquitates Italicae medii aevi, wrote the Annali d'Italia, minutely narrating facts derived from authentic sources. Muratori's associates in his historical research were Scipione Maffei of Verona and Apostolo Zeno of Venice. In his Verona illustrata Maffei left a treasure of learning that was also an excellent historical monograph. Zeno added much to the erudition of literary history, both in his Dissertazioni Vossiane and in his notes to the Biblioteca dell'eloquenza italiana of Monsignore Giusto Fontanini. Girolamo Tiraboschi and Count Giammaria Mazzucchelli of Brescia devoted themselves to literary history.

While the new spirit of the times led to the investigation of historical sources, it also encouraged inquiry into the mechanism of economic and social laws. Ferdinando Galiani wrote on currency; Gaetano Filangieri wrote a Scienza della legislazione. Cesare Beccaria, in his Trattato dei delitti e delle pene, made a contribution to the reform of the penal system and promoted the abolition of torture.

=== Metastasio and the melodrama ===
The reforming movement sought to throw off the conventional and the artificial, and to return to truth. Apostolo Zeno and Pietro Metastasio had endeavoured to make melodrama and reason compatible. Metastasio gave fresh expression to the affections, a natural turn to the dialogue and some interest to the plot; if he had not fallen into constant unnatural overrefinement and mawkishness, and into frequent anachronisms, he might have been considered the most important writer of opera seria libretti and the first dramatic reformer of the 18th century.

=== Carlo Goldoni ===
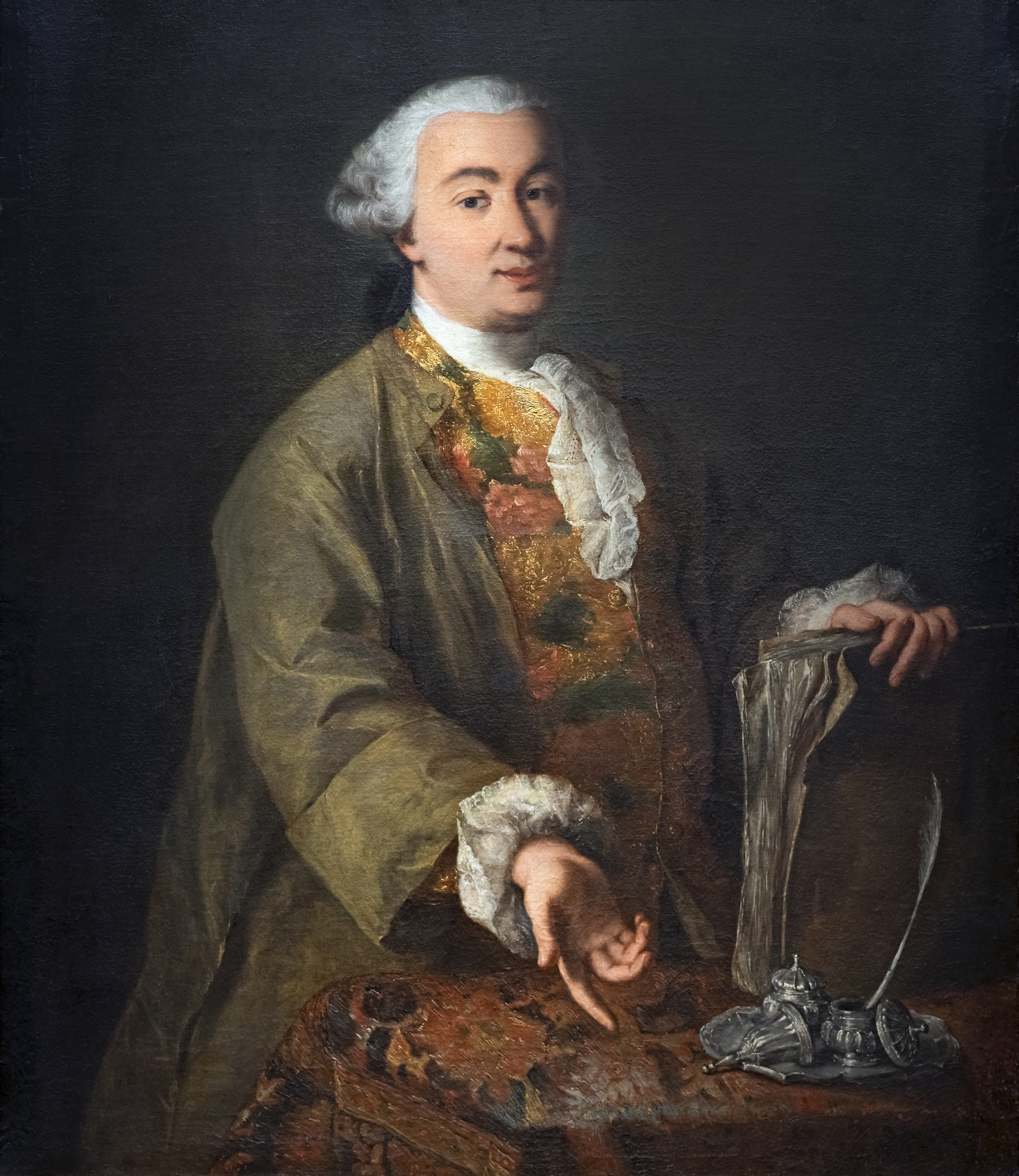
Portrait of Carlo Goldoni by Alessandro Longhi

Carlo Goldoni overcame resistance from the old popular form of comedy, with the masks of pantalone, of the doctor, harlequin, Brighella, etc., and created the comedy of character, following Molière's example. Many of his comedies were written in Venetian. His works include some of Italy's most famous and best-loved plays. Goldoni also wrote under the pen name and title Polisseno Fegeio, Pastor Arcade, which he claimed in his memoirs the "Arcadians of Rome" bestowed on him. One of his best-known works is the comic play Servant of Two Masters, which has been translated and adapted internationally numerous times.

=== Giuseppe Parini ===
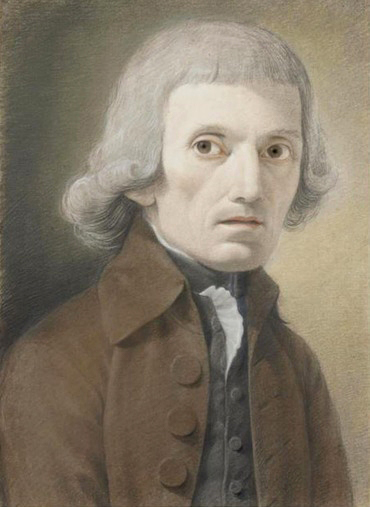
Portrait of Giuseppe Parini by Giuseppe Mazzola

The leading figure of the literary revival of the 18th century was Giuseppe Parini. In a collection of poems he published at twenty-three years of age, under the name of Ripano Eupilino, the poet shows his faculty of taking his scenes from real life, and in his satirical pieces he exhibits a spirit of outspoken opposition to his own times. Improving on the poems of his youth, he showed himself an innovator in his lyrics, rejecting at once Petrarchism, Secentismo and Arcadia. In the Odi the satirical note is already heard, but it comes out more strongly in Del giorno, which assumes major social and historical value. As an artist, going straight back to classical forms, he opened the way to the school of Vittorio Alfieri, Ugo Foscolo and Vincenzo Monti. As a work of art, the Giorno is sometimes a little hard and broken, as a protest against the Arcadian monotony.

=== Linguistic purism ===
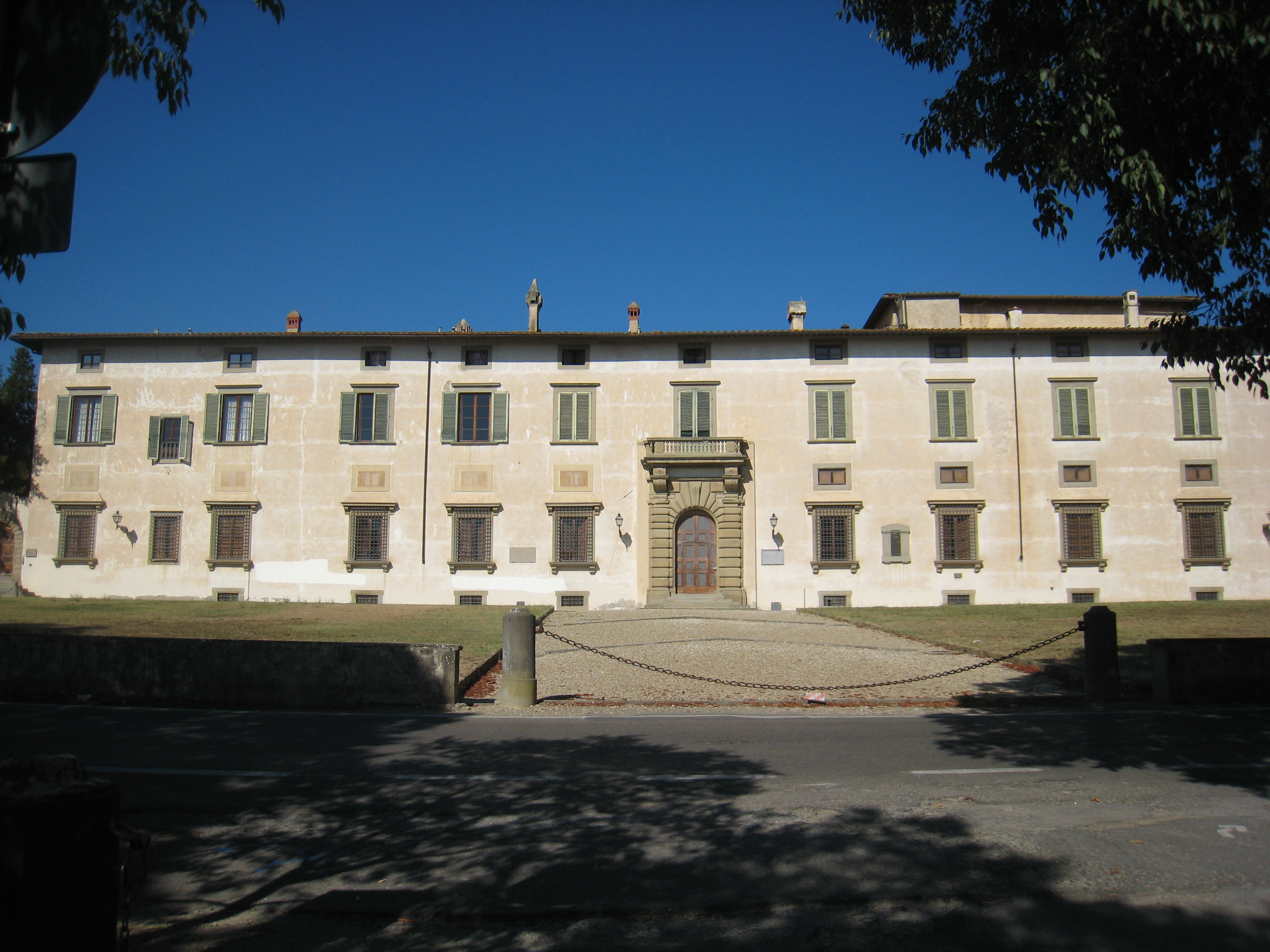
Villa di Castello, headquarters of the Accademia della Crusca

In the second half of the 18th century, the Italian language was especially full of French expressions; a question arose about purism of language. Prose needed to be restored for the sake of national dignity, and it was believed that this could not be done except by going back to the writers of the 14th century, to the aurei trecentisti, as they were called, or else to the classics of Italian literature. One of the promoters of the new school was Antonio Cesari, who republished ancient authors, and brought out a new edition, with additions, of the Vocabolario della Crusca. He wrote a dissertation Sopra lo stato presente della lingua italiana, and endeavoured to establish the supremacy of Tuscan and of Dante, Petrarch, and Boccaccio.

To this Tuscan supremacy, proclaimed and upheld by Cesari, there was opposed a Lombard school, which with Dante's De vulgari eloquentia returned to the idea of the lingua illustre. At the head of the Lombard school were Monti and his son-in-law Count Giulio Perticari. This caused Vincenzo Monti to write Proposta di alcune correzioni ed aggiunte al vocabolario della Crusca, in which he attacked the Tuscanism of the Accademia della Crusca. The dispute about language took its place beside literary and political disputes, and all Italy took part in it: Basilio Puoti at Naples, Paolo Costa in the Romagna, Marc' Antonio Parenti at Modena, Salvatore Betti at Rome, Giovanni Gherardini in Lombardy, Luigi Fornaciari at Lucca, and Vincenzo Nannucci at Florence. A patriot, a classicist and a purist all at once was Pietro Giordani, born in 1774; he was almost a compendium of the literary movement of the time. Learned in Greek and Latin authors, and in the Italian trecentisti, he left only a few writings, but they were carefully elaborated in point of style, and his prose was greatly admired in its time. Giordani closes the literary epoch of the classicists.

=== Minor writers ===
Gasparo Gozzi's satire was less elevated, but directed towards the same end as Parini's. Gozzi's satire has some slight resemblance in style to Lucian's. In a journal called the Frusta letteraria he mercilessly criticized the works then being published in Italy. The Frusta was the first book of independent criticism directed particularly against the Arcadians and the pedants.

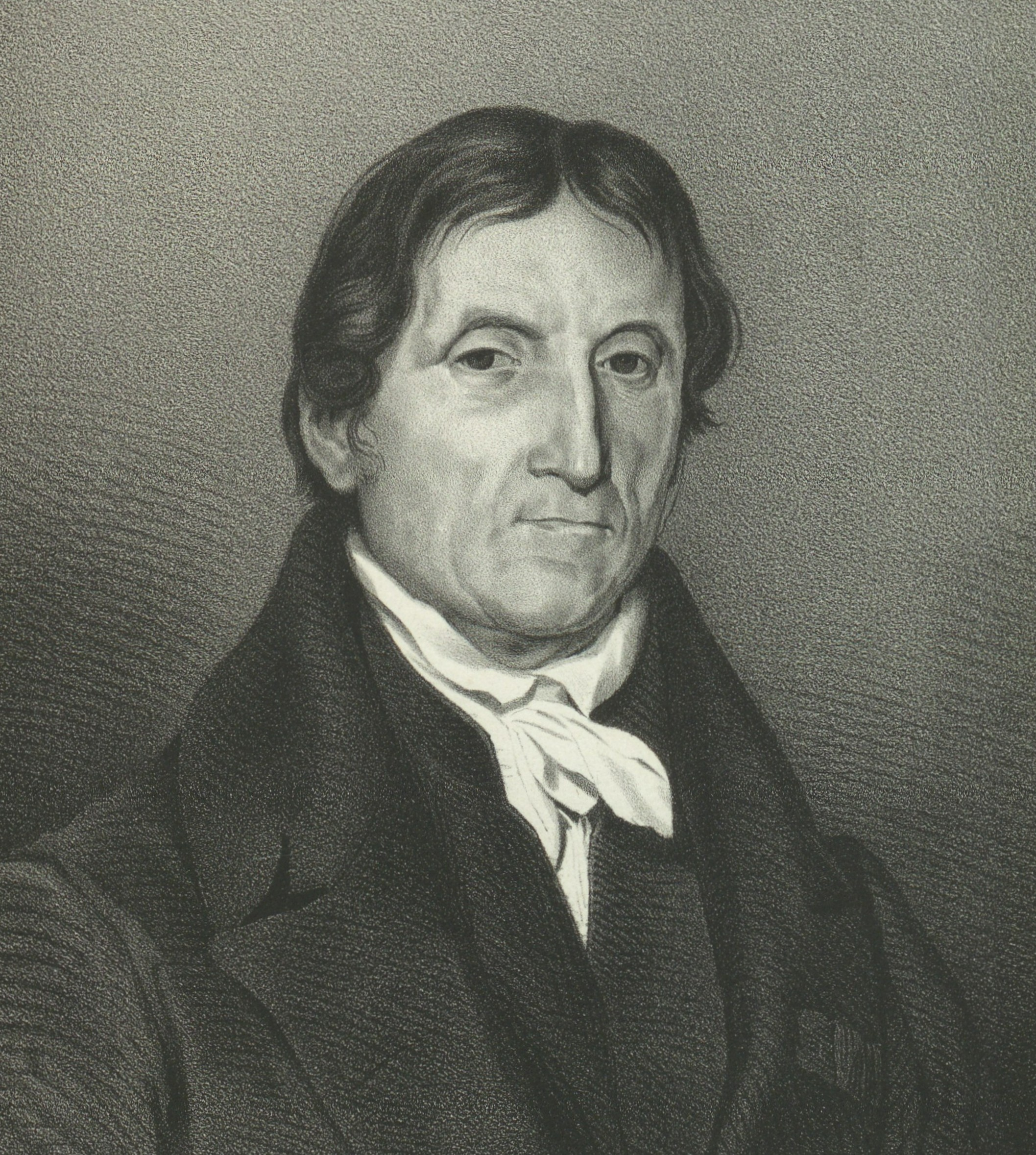
Carlo Botta

Giovanni Battista Niccolini was a classicist; in imitating Aeschylus, as well as in writing the Discorsi sulla tragedia greca, and the Sublime Michelangelo, Niccolini displayed his devotion to ancient literature. In his tragedies, he set himself free from the excessive rigidity of Alfieri, and partly approached the English and German tragic authors. He nearly always chose political subjects. Such are Nabucco, Antonio Foscarini, Giovanni da Procida, Lodovico il Moro and others. He assailed papal Rome in Arnaldo da Brescia. Niccolini's tragedies show a rich lyric vein rather than dramatic genius. He has the merit of having vindicated liberal ideas, and of having opened a new path to Italian tragedy.

Carlo Botta wrote a History of Italy from 1789 to 1814; and later continued Guicciardini's History up to 1789. Close to Botta comes Pietro Colletta; he also in his Storia del reame di Napoli dal 1734 al 1825 had the idea of defending the independence and liberty of Italy in a style borrowed from Tacitus. Lazzaro Papi of Lucca, author of the Commentari della rivoluzione francese dal 1789 al 1814, was not altogether unlike Botta and Colletta. He also was a historian in the classical style and treats his subject with patriotic feeling, but as an artist, he perhaps excels in the other two.

Alberto Fortis started the Morlachist literary movement in Italian and Venetian literature with his 1774 work Viaggio in Dalmazia ('Journey to Dalmatia').

== Revolution: Patriotism and classicism ==
The ideas behind the French Revolution of 1789 gave a special direction to Italian literature in the second half of the 18th century. Love of liberty and desire for equality created a literature aimed at national objects, seeking to improve the condition of the country by freeing it from the double yoke of political and religious despotism. The Italians who aspired to political redemption believed it inseparable from an intellectual revival, and thought that this could only be effected by a reunion with ancient classicism. This was a repetition of what had occurred in the first half of the 15th century.

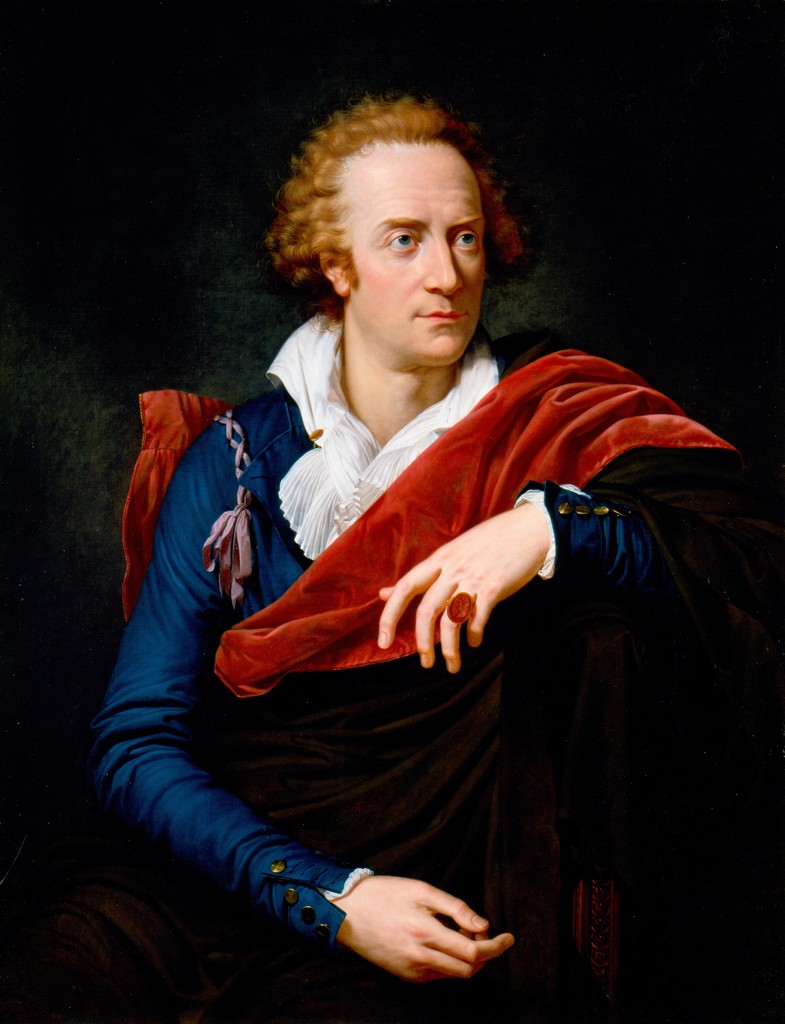
Portrait of Vittorio Alfieri by François-Xavier Fabre

Patriotism and classicism were the two principles that inspired the literature that began with Vittorio Alfieri. He worshipped the Greek and Roman idea of popular liberty in arms against tyranny. He took the subjects of his tragedies from the history of these nations and made his ancient characters talk like revolutionists of his time. The Arcadian school, with its verbosity and triviality, was rejected. His aim was to be brief, concise, strong and bitter, to aim at the sublime as opposed to the lowly and pastoral. He saved literature from Arcadian vacuities, leading it towards a national end, and armed himself with patriotism and classicism. It is to his dramas that Alfieri is chiefly indebted for the high reputation he has attained. The appearance of the tragedies of Alfieri was perhaps the most important literary event that occurred in Italy during the 18th century.

Vincenzo Monti was a patriot too, and wrote the Pellegrino apostolico, the Bassvilliana and the Feroniade; Napoleon's victories caused him to write the Prometeo and the Musagonia; in his Fanatismo and his Superstizione he attacked the papacy; afterwards he sang the praises of the Austrians. Knowing little Greek, he succeeded in translating the Iliad in a way remarkable for its Homeric feeling, and in his Bassvilliana he is on a level with Dante. In him classical poetry seemed to revive in all its florid grandeur.

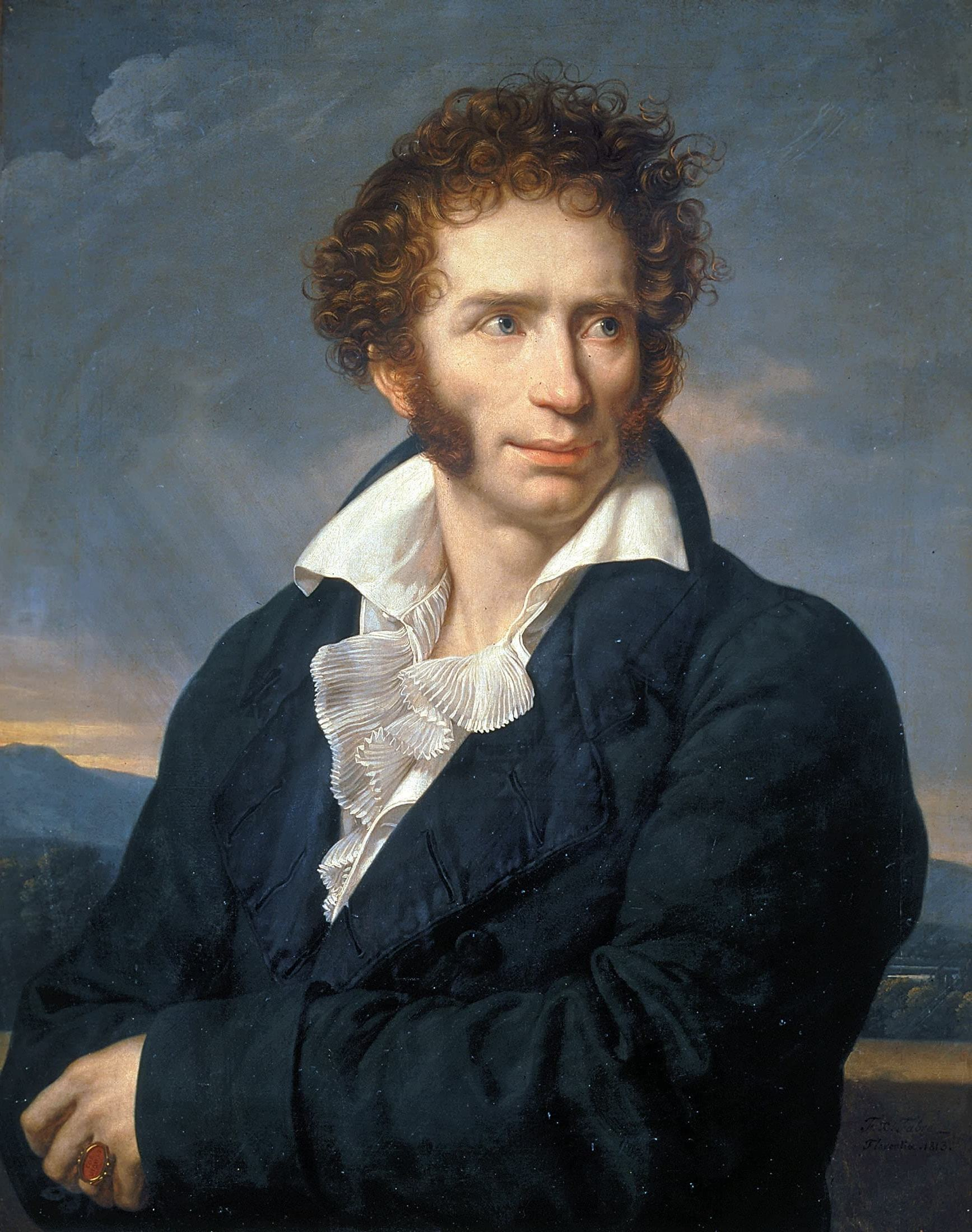
Portrait of Ugo Foscolo by François-Xavier Fabre

Ugo Foscolo was an eager patriot, inspired by classical models. The Lettere di Jacopo Ortis, inspired by Goethe's The Sorrows of Young Werther, are a love story with a mixture of patriotism; they contain a violent protest against the Treaty of Campo Formio, and an outburst from Foscolo's own heart about an unhappy love-affair of his. His passions were sudden and violent. To one of these passions Ortis owed its origin, and it is perhaps the best and most sincere of all his writings. The Sepolcri, which is his best poem, was prompted by high feeling, and the mastery of versification shows wonderful art. Among his prose works a high place belongs to his translation of the Sentimental Journey of Laurence Sterne, a writer by whom Foscolo was deeply affected. He wrote for English readers some Essays on Petrarch and on the texts of the Decamerone and of Dante, which are remarkable for when they were written, and which may have initiated a new type of literary criticism in Italy. The men who made the revolution of 1848 were brought up in his work.

== 19th century: Romanticism and the Risorgimento ==
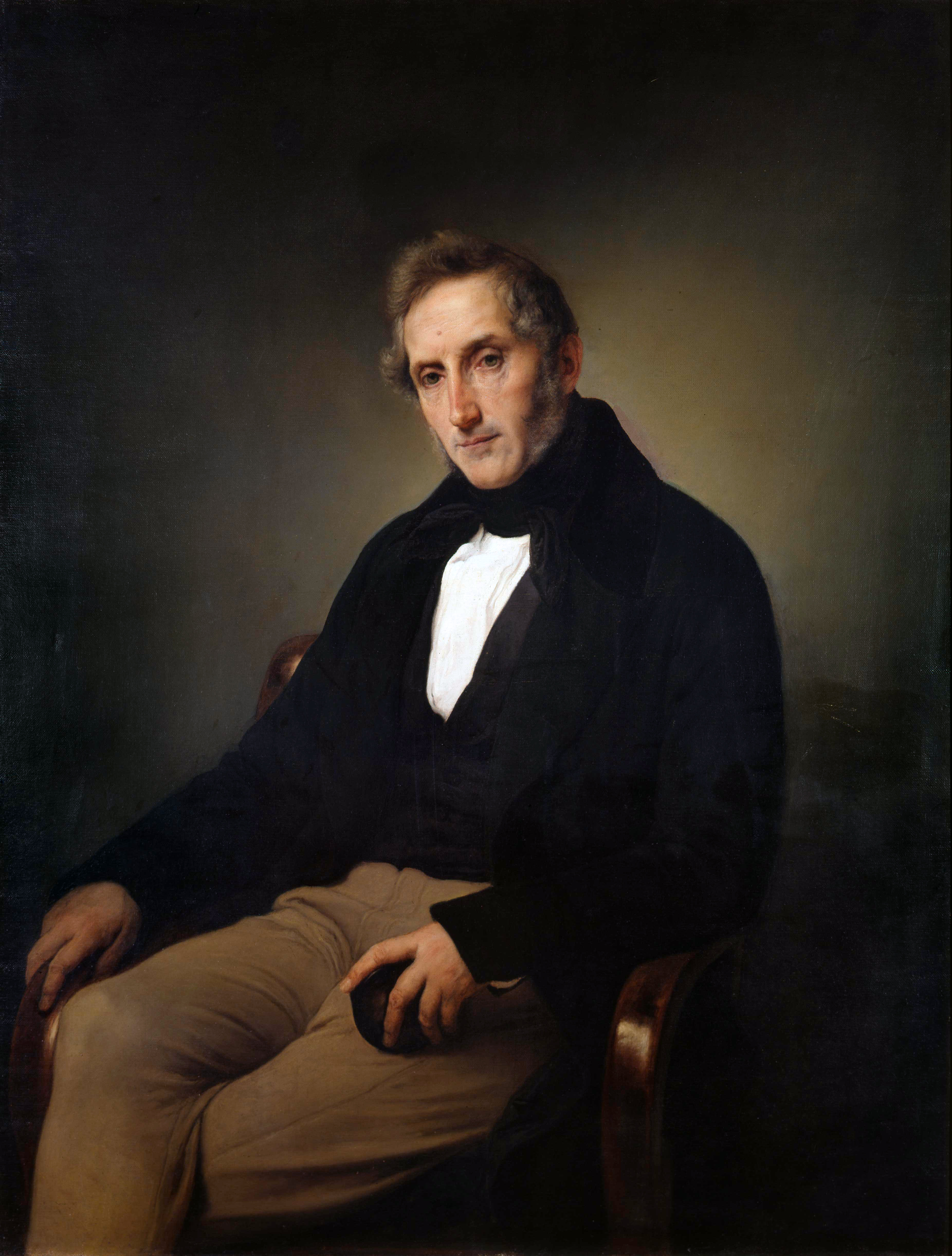
Portrait of Alessandro Manzoni by Francesco Hayez

The romantic school had as its organ the Conciliatore established in 1818 at Milan, on the staff of which were Silvio Pellico, Ludovico di Breme, Giovile Scalvini, Tommaso Grossi, Giovanni Berchet, Samuele Biava, and Alessandro Manzoni. All were influenced by the ideas that, especially in Germany, constituted the movement called Romanticism. In Italy the course of literary reform took another direction.

The main instigator of the reform was Alessandro Manzoni. He formulated the objects of the new school, saying that it aspired to try to discover and express il vero storico and il vero morale, not only as an end, but as the widest and eternal source of the beautiful. It is realism in art that characterizes Italian literature from Manzoni onwards. I promessi sposi (The Betrothed) is the work that has made him immortal. The Promessi Sposi is generally ranked among the masterpieces of world literature. The novel is also a symbol of the Italian Risorgimento, both for its patriotic message and because it was a fundamental milestone in the development of the modern, unified Italian language.

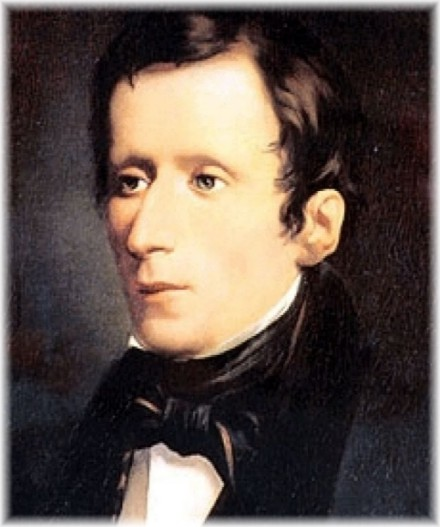
Portrait of Giacomo Leopardi by Domenico Morelli

Giacomo Leopardi was one of the great poets of the age. He was also an admirable prose writer. In his Operette Morali—dialogues and discourses marked by irony regarding the philosophy of the era—the clearness of style, the simplicity of language and the depth of conception are such that perhaps he is one of the most skilled writers of Italian prose. He is widely seen as one of the most radical and challenging thinkers of the 19th century but routinely compared by Italian critics to his older contemporary Alessandro Manzoni despite expressing "diametrically opposite positions". The strongly lyrical quality of his poetry made him a central figure on the European and international literary and cultural landscape.

=== History and politics in the 19th ===
As realism in art gained ground, the positive method in criticism kept pace with it. History returned to its spirit of learned research, as is shown in such works as the Archivio storico italiano, established at Florence by Giovan Pietro Vieusseux, the Storia d'Italia nel medio evo by Carlo Troya, a remarkable treatise by Manzoni himself, Sopra alcuni punti della storia longobardica in Italia, and the very fine history of the Vespri siciliani by Michele Amari. Alongside the great artists Leopardi and Manzoni, alongside the learned scholars, there was also in the 19th century patriotic literature. Vieusseux had a distinct political object when in 1820 he established the monthly review Antologia. His Archivio storico italiano (1842) was, under a different form, a continuation of the Antologia, which was suppressed in 1833 owing to the action of the Russian government.

The literary movement that preceded and was contemporary with the political revolution of 1848 may be said to be represented by four writers—Giuseppe Giusti, Francesco Domenico Guerrazzi, Vincenzo Gioberti and Cesare Balbo. Giusti wrote epigrammatic satires in popular language. Guerrazzi had a great reputation and great influence, but his historical novels, though avidly read before 1848, were soon forgotten. Gioberti was a powerful polemical writer; the Primato morale e civile degli Italiani will last as an important document of the times, and the Gesuita moderno is the most tremendous indictment of the Jesuits ever written in Italy. Balbo was an earnest student of history. Like Gioberti in his first period, Balbo was zealous for the civil papacy, and for a federation of the Italian states presided over by it. His Sommario della storia d'Italia is an excellent epitome.

== Between the 19th and 20th century ==
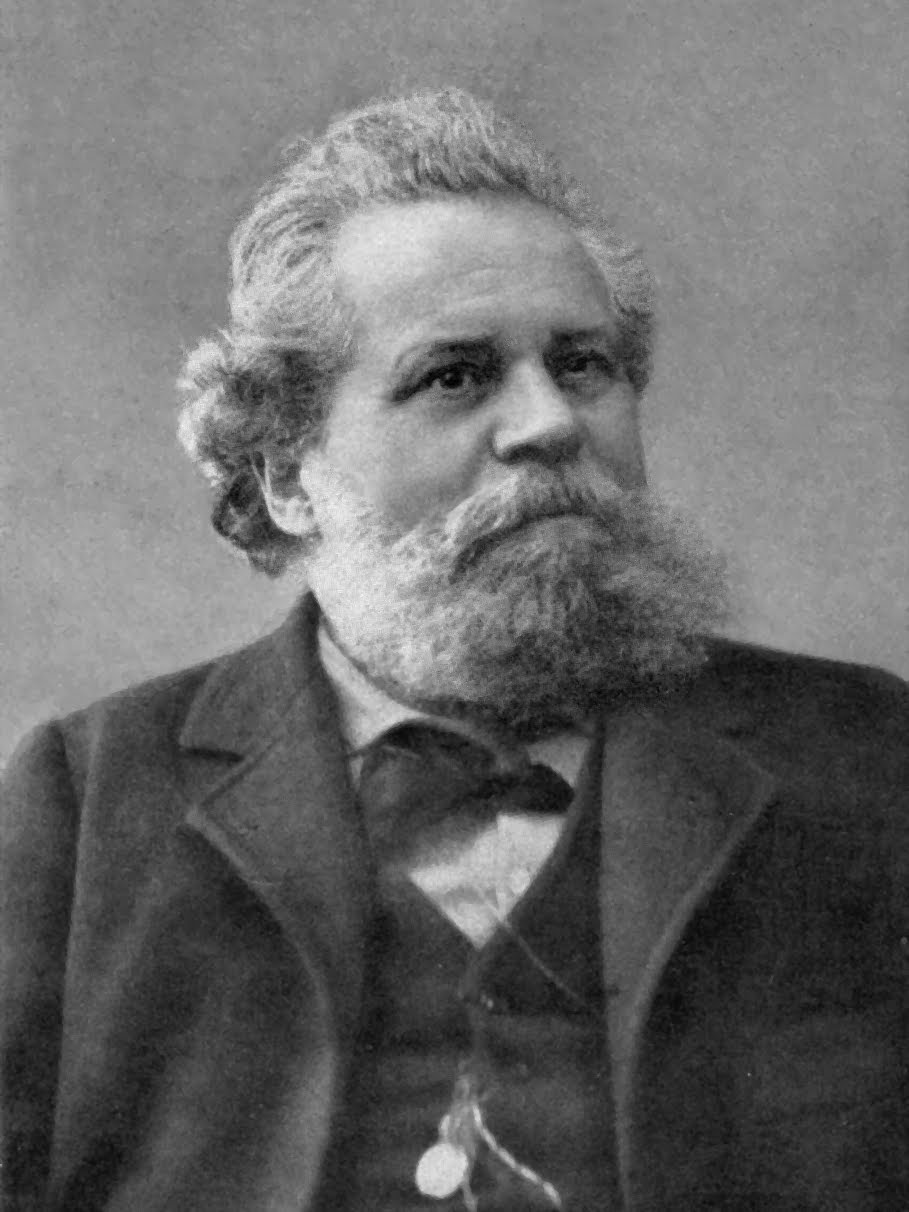
Giosuè Carducci

After the Risorgimento, political literature became less important. The first part of this period is characterized by two divergent trends of literature that both opposed Romanticism. The first trend is the Scapigliatura, that attempted to rejuvenate Italian culture through foreign influences, notably from the poetry of Charles Baudelaire and the works of American writer Edgar Allan Poe. The second trend is represented by Giosuè Carducci, a dominant figure of this period, fiery opponent of the Romantics and restorer of the ancient metres and spirit who, great as a poet, was scarcely less distinguished as a literary critic and historian.

The influence of Émile Zola is evident in the Verismo. Luigi Capuana but most notably Giovanni Verga and were its main exponents and the authors of a verismo manifesto. Capuana published the novel Giacinta, generally regarded as the "manifesto" of Italian verismo. Unlike French naturalism, which was based on positivistic ideals, Verga and Capuana rejected claims of the scientific nature and social usefulness of the movement.

Instead Decadentism was based mainly on the Decadent style of some artists and authors of France and England about the end of the 19th century. The main authors of the Italian version were Antonio Fogazzaro, Giovanni Pascoli, best known for his Myricae and Poemetti, and Gabriele D'Annunzio. Although differing stylistically, they championed idiosyncrasy and irrationality against scientific rationalism. Gabriele d'Annunzio produced original work in poetry, drama and fiction, of extraordinary originality. He began with some lyrics distinguished no less by their exquisite beauty of form than by their licence, and these characteristics reappeared in a long series of poems, plays and novels.

Edmondo de Amicis is better known for his moral works and travels than for his fiction. Of the women novelists, Matilde Serao and Grazia Deledda became popular. Deledda was awarded the 1926 Nobel Prize in Literature for her works.

=== Minor writers ===
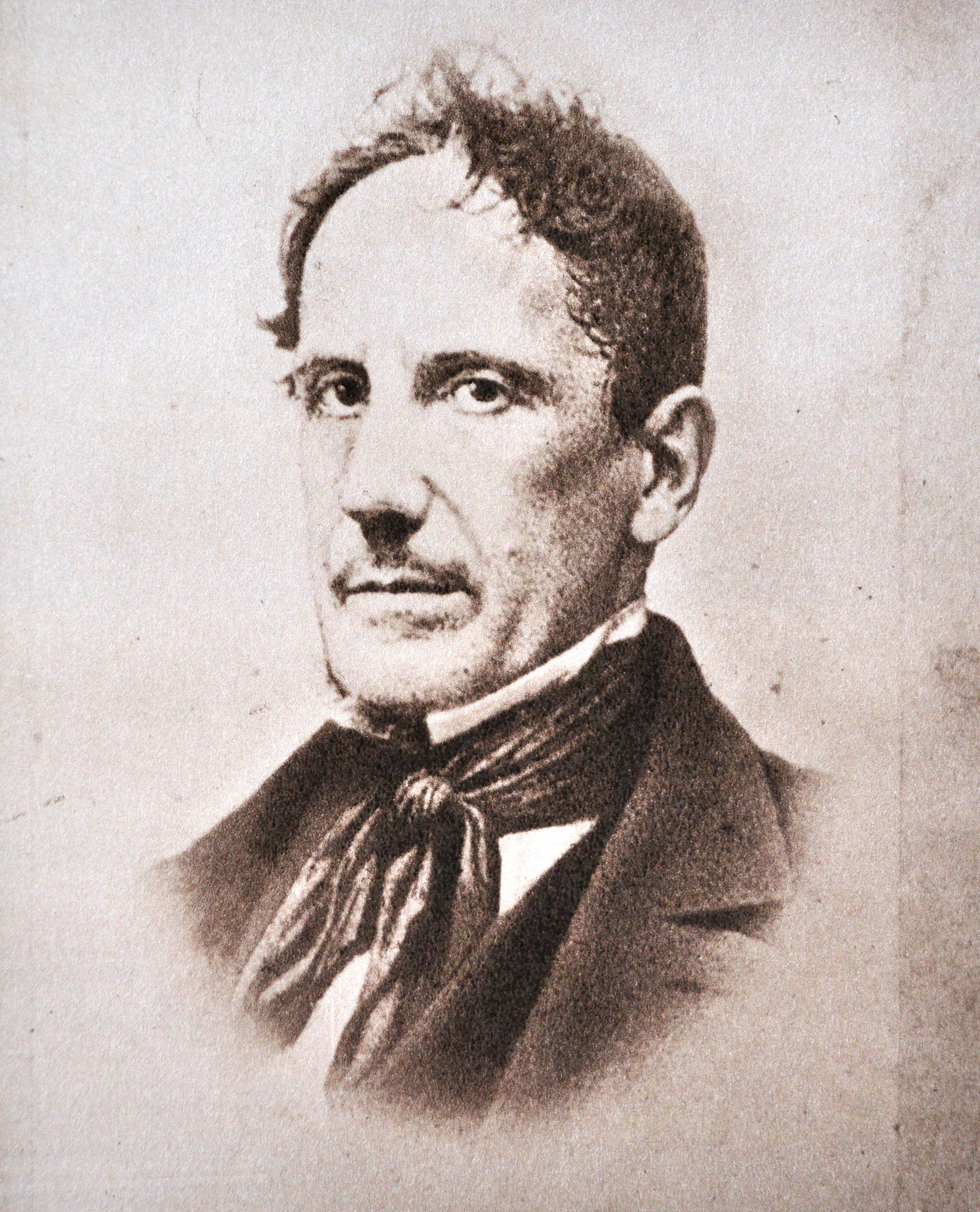
Giuseppe Gioacchino Belli

Giovanni Prati and Aleardo Aleardi continued romantic traditions. Other classical poets are Giuseppe Chiarini, Arturo Graf, Guido Mazzoni and Giovanni Marradi, of whom the two last named may perhaps be regarded as special disciples of Carducci. Enrico Panzacchi was at heart still a romantic. Olindo Guerrini (who wrote under the pseudonym of Lorenzo Stecchetti) is the chief representative of verismo in poetry, and, though his early works obtained a succès de scandale, he is the author of many lyrics of intrinsic value. Alfredo Baccelli and Mario Rapisardi are epic poets of distinction. Felice Cavallotti is the author of the stirring Marcia de Leonida.

Among dialect writers, the great Roman poet Giuseppe Gioacchino Belli found numerous successors, such as Renato Fucini (Pisa) and Cesare Pascarella (Rome). Among the women poets, Ada Negri, with her socialistic Fatalità and Tempeste, achieved a great reputation; and others, such as Annie Vivanti, were highly esteemed in Italy.

Among the dramatists, Pietro Cossa in tragedy, Ferdinando Martini, and Paolo Ferrari in comedy, represent the older schools. More modern methods were adopted by Giuseppe Giacosa.

In fiction, the historical romance fell into disfavour, though Emilio De Marchi produced some good examples. The novel of intrigue was cultivated by Salvatore Farina.

== 20th century and beyond ==
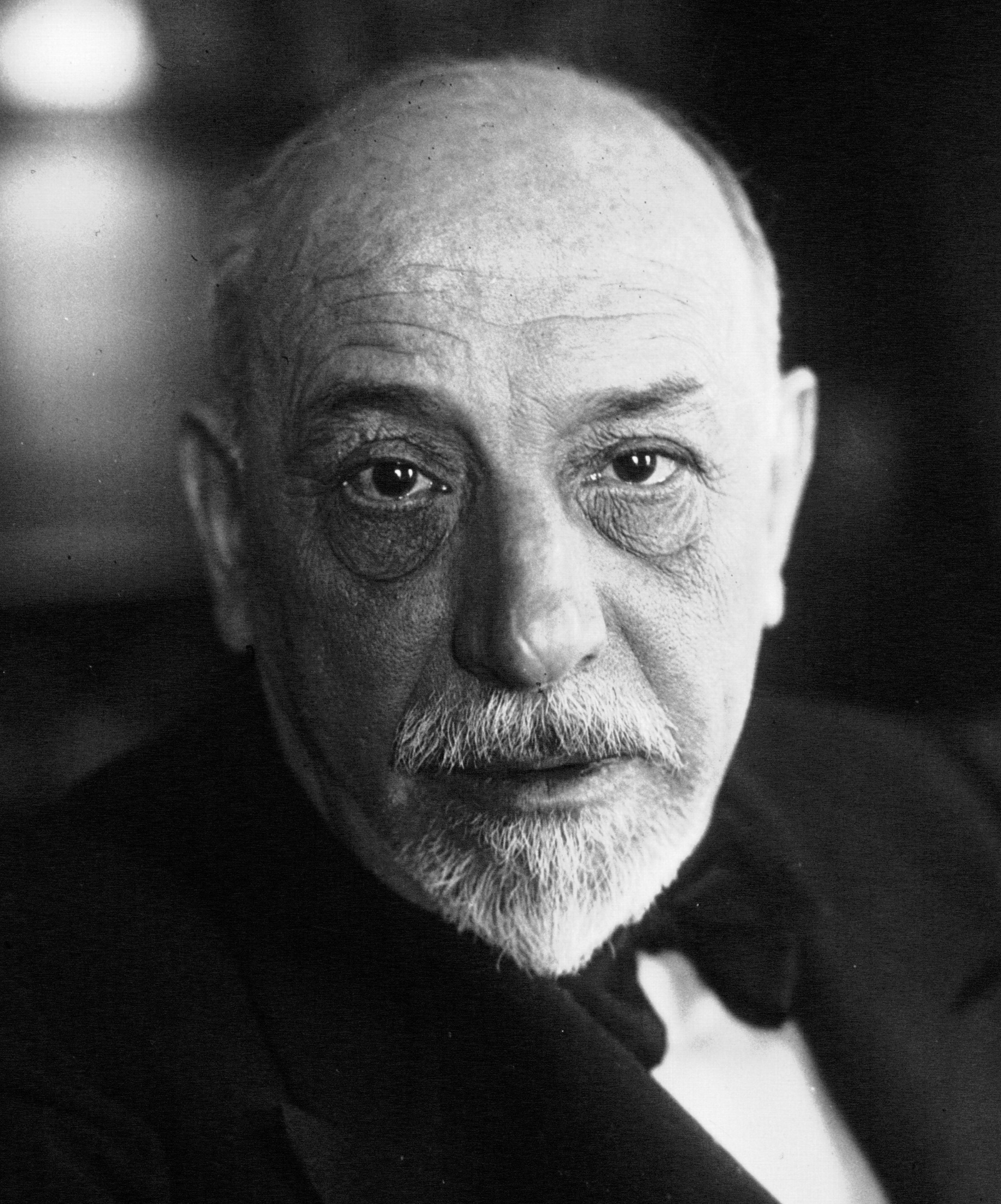
Luigi Pirandello

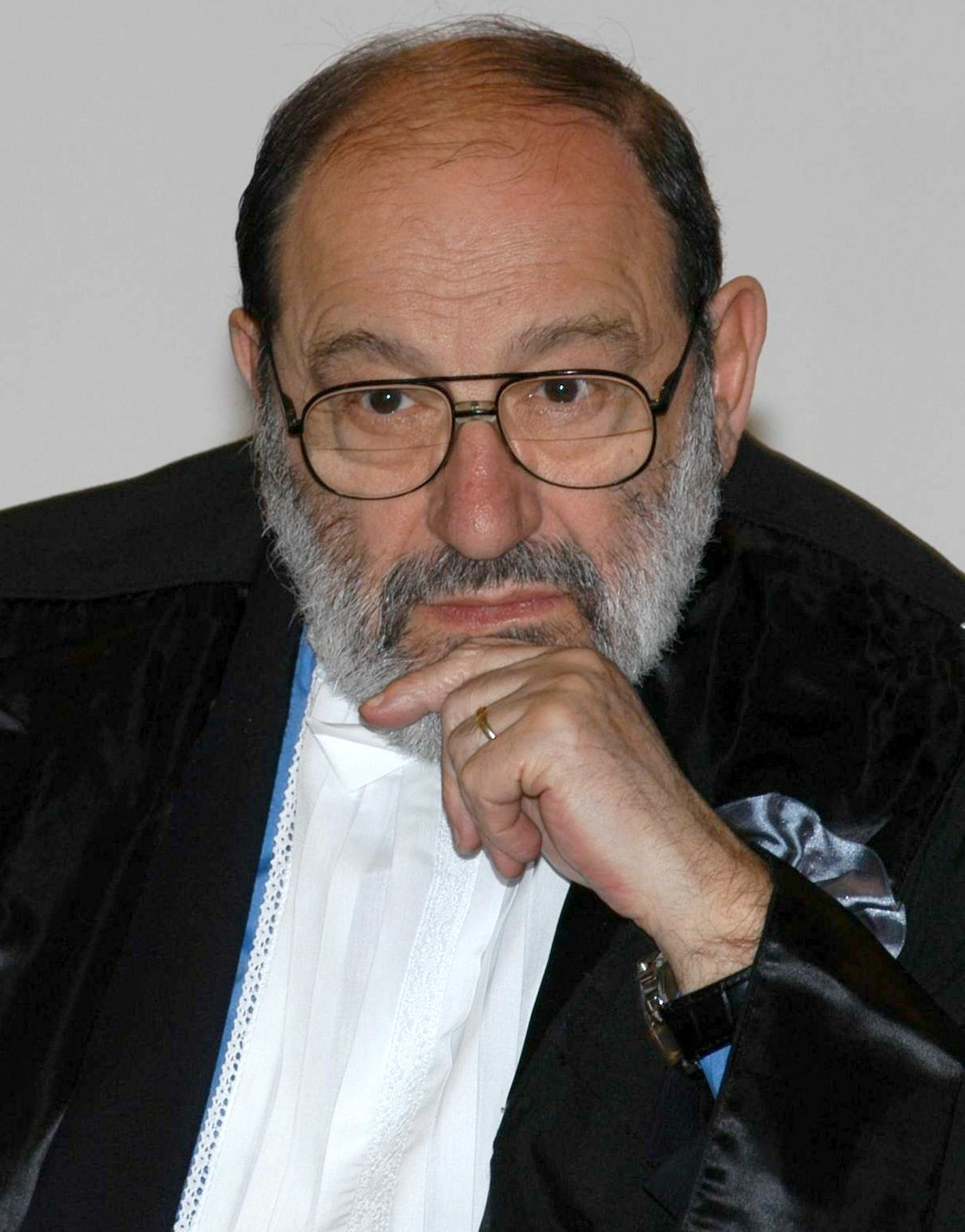
Umberto Eco

Important early-20th century writers include Italo Svevo, the author of La coscienza di Zeno (1923), and Luigi Pirandello (winner of the 1934 Nobel Prize in Literature), who explored the shifting nature of reality in his prose fiction and such plays as Sei personaggi in cerca d'autore (Six Characters in Search of an Author, 1921). Federigo Tozzi was a great novelist, critically appreciated only in recent years, and considered one of the forerunners of existentialism in the European novel.

Grazia Deledda was a Sardinian writer who focused on the life, customs, and traditions of the Sardinian people in her works. In 1926 she won the Nobel Prize for literature, becoming Italy's first and only woman recipient.

Sibilla Aleramo published her first novel, Una Donna (A Woman) in 1906. Today the novel is widely acknowledged as Italy's premier feminist novel. Her writing mixes together autobiographical and fictional elements.

Pitigrilli was the pseudonym of Dino Segre who published his most famous novel (cocaine) in 1921. Due to his portrayal of drug use and sex, the Catholic Church listed it as a "forbidden book". It has been translated into numerous languages, reprinted in new editions, and has become a classic.

Maria Messina was a Sicilian writer who focused heavily on Sicilian culture with a dominant theme being the isolation and oppression of young Sicilian women. She achieved modest recognition during her life including receiving the Medaglia D'oro Prize for "La Mérica".

Anna Bantiis most well known for her short story Il Coraggio Delle Donne (The Courage of Women) which was published in 1940. Her autobiographical work, Un Grido Lacerante, was published in 1981 and won the Antonio Feltrinelli prize. As well as being a successful author, Banti is recognized as a literary, cinematic, and art critic.

Elsa Morante began writing at an early age. One of the central themes in Morante's works is narcissism. She also uses love as a metaphor in her works, saying that love can be passion and obsession and can lead to despair and destruction. She won the Premio Viareggio award in 1948.

Alba de Céspedes was a Cuban-Italian writer from Rome. She was an anti-Fascist and was involved in the Italian Resistance. Her work was greatly influenced by the history and culture that developed around World War II. Although her books were bestsellers, Alba has been overlooked in recent studies of Italian women writers.

Poetry was represented by the Crepuscolari and the Futurists; the foremost member of the latter group was Filippo Tommaso Marinetti. Leading Modernist poets from later in the century include Salvatore Quasimodo (winner of the 1959 Nobel Prize in Literature), Giuseppe Ungaretti, Umberto Saba, who won fame for his collection of poems Il canzoniere, and Eugenio Montale (winner of the 1975 Nobel Prize in Literature). They were described by critics as "hermeticists".

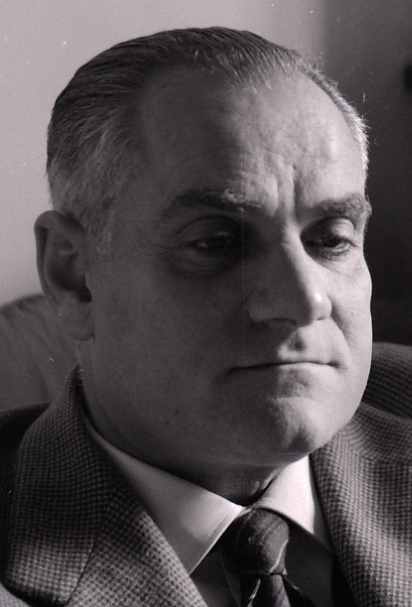
Alberto Moravia, one of the leading figures of Italian Neorealism in literature

Neorealism was a movement that developed rapidly between the 1940s and the 1950s. Although its foundations were laid in the 1920s, it flourished only after the fall of Fascism in Italy, as this type of literature was not welcomed by Fascist authorities because of its social criticism and partially because some of the "new realist" authors could hold Anti-Fascist views. For example, Alberto Moravia, one of the leading writers of the movement, had trouble with finding a publisher for his novel which brought him fame, Gli indifferenti (1929), and after he published it, he was "driven into hiding"; Carlo Bernari's Tre operai (1934, Three Workers) was unofficially banned personally by Mussolini who saw "communism" in the novel; Ignazio Silone published Fontamara (1933) in exile; Elio Vittorini was put in prison after publishing Conversazione in Sicilia (1941). The movement was profoundly affected by the translations of socially conscious U.S. and English writers during the 1930s and 1940s, namely Ernest Hemingway, William Faulkner, John Steinbeck, John Dos Passos and the others; the translators of their works, Vittorini and Cesare Pavese, would later become acclaimed novelists of the movement. After the war, the movement began rapidly developing and took the label "Neorealism"; Marxism and the experiences of the war became sources of inspiration for the postwar authors. Moravia wrote the novels The Conformist (1951) and La Ciociara (1957), while The Moon and the Bonfires (1949) became Pavese's most recognized work; Primo Levi documented his experiences in Auschwitz in If This Is a Man (1947); among the other writers were Carlo Levi, who reflected the experience of political exile in southern Italy in Christ Stopped at Eboli (1951); Curzio Malaparte, author of Kaputt (1944) and The Skin (1949), novels dealing with the war on the Eastern Front and in Naples; Pier Paolo Pasolini, also a poet and a film director, who described the life of the Roman lumpenproletariat in The Ragazzi (1955); and Corrado Alvaro.

Dino Buzzati wrote fantastic and allegorical fiction that critics have compared to Kafka and Beckett. Italo Calvino also ventured into fantasy in the trilogy I nostri antenati (Our Ancestors, 1952–1959) and post-modernism in the novel Se una notte d'inverno un viaggiatore... (If on a Winter's Night a Traveller, 1979). Carlo Emilio Gadda was the author of the experimental Quer pasticciaccio brutto de via Merulana (1957).

Giuseppe Tomasi di Lampedusa wrote only one novel, Il Gattopardo (The Leopard, 1958), but it is one of the most famous in Italian literature; it deals with the life of a Sicilian nobleman in the 19th century. Leonardo Sciascia came to public attention with his novel Il giorno della civetta (The Day of the Owl, 1961), exposing the extent of Mafia corruption in modern Sicilian society. More recently, Umberto Eco became internationally successful with the Medieval detective story Il nome della rosa (The Name of the Rose, 1980).

Dacia Maraini is one of the most successful contemporary Italian women writers. Her novels focus on the condition of women in Italy and in some works she speaks to the changes women can make for themselves and society.

Aldo Busi is also one of the most important Italian contemporary writers. His extensive production of novels, essays, travel books and manuals provides a detailed account of modern society, especially the Italian one. He is also well-known as a refined translator.

== Children's literature ==
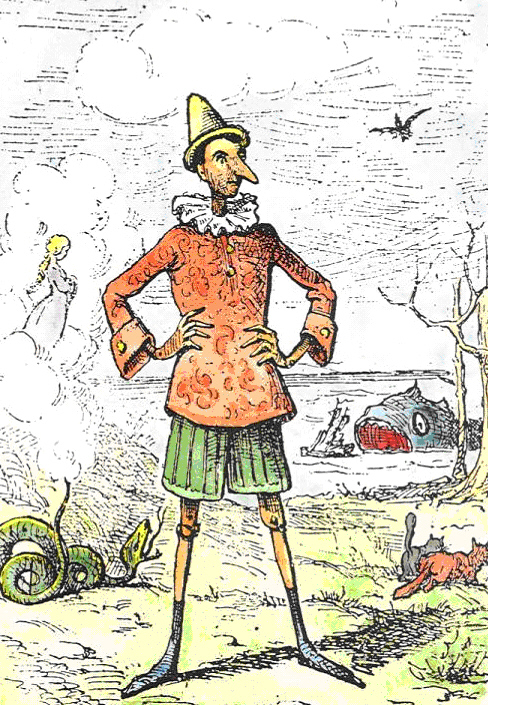
The Adventures of Pinocchio is one of the world's most translated books and a canonical piece of children's literature.

Italy has a long history of children's literature. In 1634, the Pentamerone from Italy became the first major published collection of European folk tales. The Pentamerone contained the first literary European version of the story of Cinderella. The author, Giambattista Basile, created collections of fairy tales that include the oldest recorded forms of many well-known European fairy tales. In the 1550s, Giovanni Francesco Straparola released The Facetious Nights of Straparola. Called the first European storybook to contain fairy tales, it eventually had 75 separate stories, albeit intended for an adult audience. Giulio Cesare Croce also borrowed from stories children enjoyed for his books.

In 1883, Carlo Collodi wrote The Adventures of Pinocchio, the first Italian fantasy novel. In the same year, Emilio Salgari, the man who would become "the adventure writer par excellence for the young in Italy" published for the first time his Sandokan. In the 20th century, Italian children's literature was represented by such writers as Gianni Rodari, author of Il romanzo di Cipollino, and Nicoletta Costa, creator of Julian Rabbit and Olga the Cloud.

== Women writers ==
Italian women writers have always been underrepresented in academia. There has been an increase in the inclusion of women in academic scholarship in recent years, but representation is still inequitable. Italian women writers were first acknowledged by critics in the 1960s, and numerous feminist journals began in the 1970s, which increased readers' accessibility to and awareness of their work.

The work of Italian women writers is both progressive and penetrating; through their explorations of the feminine psyche, their critiques of women's social and economic position in Italy, and their depiction of the persistent struggle to achieve equality in a "man's world", they have shattered traditional representations of women in literature. The page played an important role in the rise of Italian feminism, as it provided women with a space to express their perspectives. Reading and writing fiction became the easiest way for women to explore and determine their place in society.

Italian war novels, such as Alba de Céspedes's Dalla parte di lei (1949), trace women's awakenings to political realities of the time. Subsequent psychological and social novels of Italian women writers examine the difficult process of growing up for women in Italian society. Examples include Maria Messina's La casa nel vicolo (1989) and Laura Di Falco's Paura di giorno (1954). After the public condemnation of women's abuse in Italian literature in the 1970s, women writers began expressing their thoughts about sexual differences in novels. Many Italian novels focus on facets of Italian identity, and women writers have always been leaders in this genre.

Among contemporary women writers are prominent figures such as Ribka Sibhatu, born in Eritrea, who in her works intertwines orality, memory, and tradition, exploring the relationship between her culture of origin and writing in Italian. Shirin Ramzanali Fazel, of Somali origin, has contributed to bringing to light the memories of colonialism and exile, often in autobiographical and testimonial forms. Cristina Ali Farah, also Somali-Italian, addresses themes such as the Somali civil war, the diaspora, and hybrid identities, using a fragmented and polyphonic narrative. Although she did not migrate from the former colonies (Eritrea, Somalia and Ethiopia), Igiaba Scego in her narrative and essayistic works also investigates the connection between Rome and Mogadishu, between private history and colonial memory, contributing to a critical rereading of urban space and national history. Kaha Mohamed Aden offers an ironic and incisive writing style that deconstructs cultural stereotypes and exoticizing representations, while Geneviève Makaping, an anthropologist and writer originally from Cameroon, is the author of Traiettorie di sguardi (2001), considered one of the first works of critical race theory in Italian, in which she analyzes the cultural mechanisms of the colonial gaze and everyday racism.

== Italians awarded with the Nobel Prize for literature ==
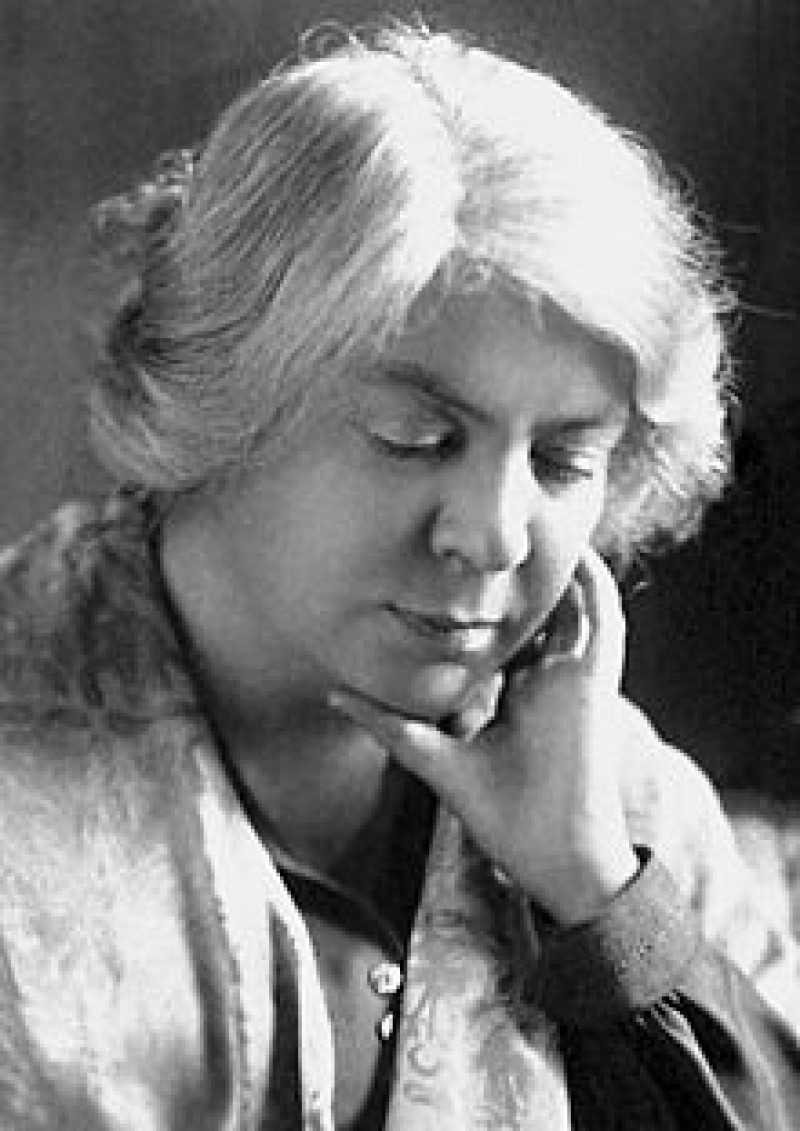
Grazia Deledda

Year	Winner	Contribution
1906	Giosuè Carducci	"Not only in consideration of his deep learning and critical research, but above all as a tribute to the creative energy, freshness of style, and lyrical force which characterize his poetic masterpieces."
1926	Grazia Deledda	"For her idealistically inspired writings which with plastic clarity picture the life on her native island and with depth and sympathy deal with human problems in general."
1934	Luigi Pirandello	"For his bold and ingenious revival of dramatic and scenic art."
1959	Salvatore Quasimodo	"For his lyrical poetry, which with classical fire expresses the tragic experience of life in our own times."
1975	Eugenio Montale	"For his distinctive poetry which, with great artistic sensitivity, has interpreted human values under the sign of an outlook on life with no illusions."
1997	Dario Fo	"Who emulates the jesters of the Middle Ages in scourging authority and upholding the dignity of the downtrodden."

== See also ==
- Languages of Italy
- Italian language
- Regional Italian
