= Western literature =

Literature written in the context of Western culture in the languages of Europe

Western literature, also known as European literature, is the literature written in the context of Western culture in the languages of Europe, and is shaped by the periods in which they were conceived, with each period containing prominent western authors, poets, and pieces of literature.

The best of Western literature is considered to be the Western canon. The list of works in the Western canon varies according to the critic's opinions on Western culture and the relative importance of its defining characteristics. Different literary periods held great influence on the literature of Western and European countries, with movements and political changes impacting the prose and poetry of the period. The 16th Century is known for the creation of Renaissance literature, while the 17th century was influenced by both Baroque and Jacobean forms. The 18th century progressed into a period known as the Enlightenment Era for many western countries. This period of military and political advancement influenced the style of literature created by French, Russian and Spanish literary figures. The 19th century was known as the Romantic era, in which the style of writing was influenced by the political issues of the century, and differed from the previous classicist form.

Western literature includes written works in many languages:

- Albanian literature
- Armenian literature
- American literature
- Aromanian literature
- Australian literature
- Austrian literature
- Basque literature
- Belarusian literature
- Belgian literature
- Bosnian literature
- British literature
- Bulgarian literature
- Canadian literature
- Catalan literature
- Croatian literature
- Cypriot literature
- Czech literature
- Danish literature
- Dutch literature
- English literature
- Estonian literature
- Faroese literature
- Finnish literature
- French literature
- Gaelic literature
- German literature
- Greek literature
  - Ancient Greek literature
- Georgian literature
- Hungarian literature
- Icelandic literature
- Irish literature
- Italian literature
- Kashubian literature
- Latin literature
- Latvian literature
- Lithuanian literature
- Luxembourgian literature
- Macedonian literature
- Maltese literature
- Moldovan literature
- New Zealand literature
- Northern Irish literature
- Norwegian literature
- Polish literature
- Portuguese literature
- Romanian literature
- Russian literature
- Scottish literature
- Serbian literature
- Slovak literature
- Slovene literature
- Sorbian literature
- Spanish literature
- Swedish literature
- Swiss literature
- Ukrainian literature
- Welsh literature
- Yiddish literature

== Early medieval Latin literature ==
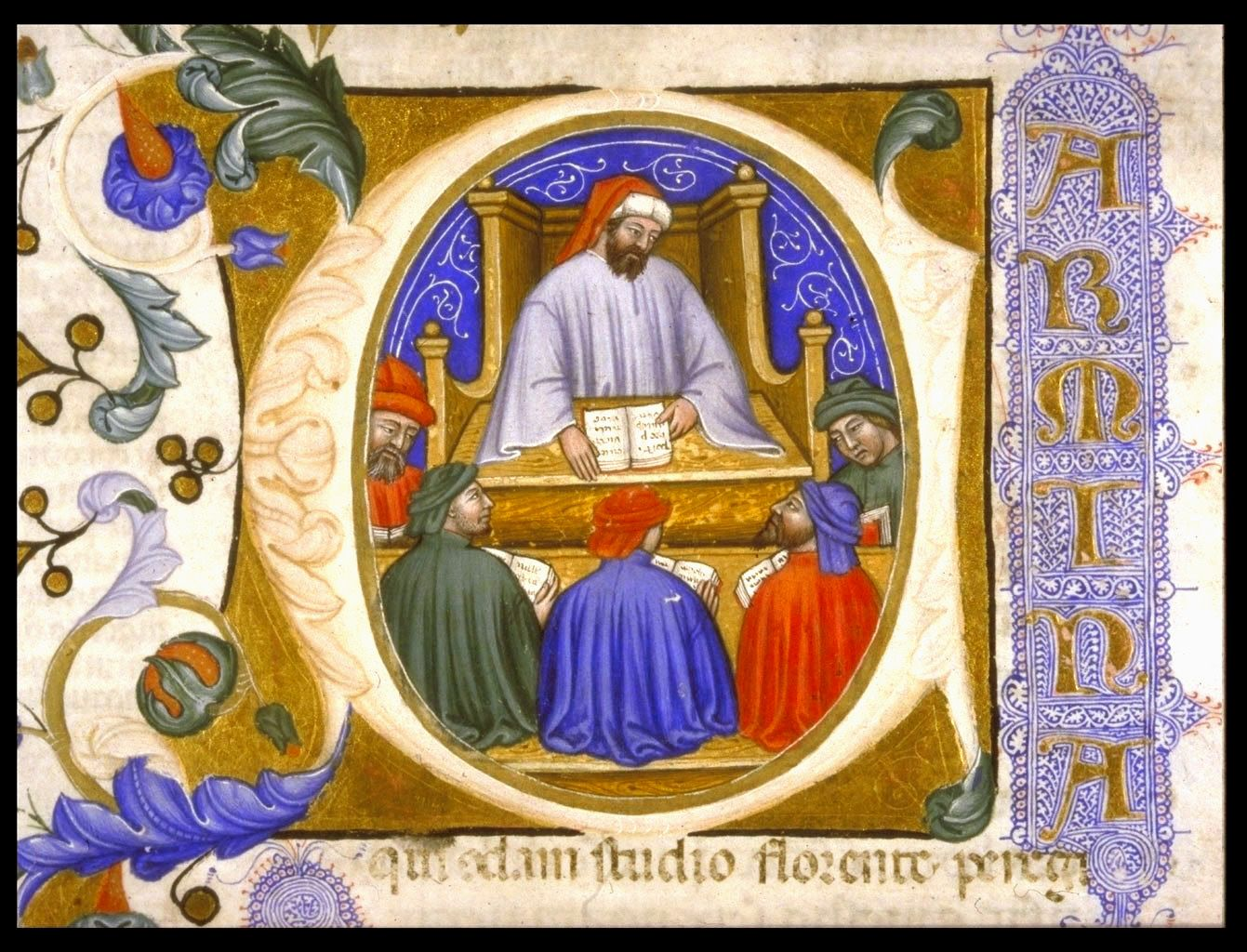
A depiction of Boethius teaching his students (1385). Boethius, a 6th-century Christian philosopher, helped keep alive the classic tradition in post-Roman Italy.

As the Western Roman Empire declined, the Latin tradition was kept alive by writers such as Cassiodorus, Boethius, and Symmachus. The liberal arts flourished at Ravenna under Theodoric, and the Gothic kings surrounded themselves with masters of rhetoric and of grammar. Some lay schools remained in Italy, and noted scholars included Magnus Felix Ennodius, Arator, Venantius Fortunatus, Felix the Grammarian, Peter of Pisa, Paulinus of Aquileia, and many others.

The later establishment of the medieval universities of Bologna, Padua, Vicenza, Naples, Salerno, Modena and Parma helped to spread culture and prepared the ground in which the new vernacular literature developed. Classical traditions did not disappear, and affection for the memory of Rome, a preoccupation with politics, and a preference for practice over theory combined to influence the development of Italian literature.

== High medieval literature ==
=== Trovatori ===
The beginning of Rambertino Buvalelli's D'un saluz uoill m'entremetre, with a decorated initial D, and Rambertino's name (Lanbertin de Buualel) at top

The earliest vernacular literary tradition in Italy was in Occitan, spoken in parts of northwest Italy. A tradition of vernacular lyric poetry arose in Poitou in the early 12th century and spread south and east, eventually reaching Italy by the end of the 12th century. The first troubadours (trovatori in Italian), as these Occitan lyric poets were called, to practise in Italy were from elsewhere, but the high aristocracy of the northern Italy was ready to patronise them. It was not long before native Italians adopted Occitan as a vehicle for poetic expression.

Among the early patrons of foreign troubadours were especially the House of Este, the Da Romano, House of Savoy, and the Malaspina. Azzo VI of Este entertained the troubadours Aimeric de Belenoi, Aimeric de Peguilhan, Albertet de Sestaro, and Peire Raimon de Tolosa from Occitania and Rambertino Buvalelli from Bologna, one of the earliest Italian troubadours. Azzo VI's daughter, Beatrice, was an object of the early poets "courtly love". Azzo's son, Azzo VII, hosted Elias Cairel and Arnaut Catalan. Rambertino was named podestà of Genoa in 1218 and it was probably during his three-year tenure there that he introduced Occitan lyric poetry to the city, which later developed a flourishing Occitan literary culture.

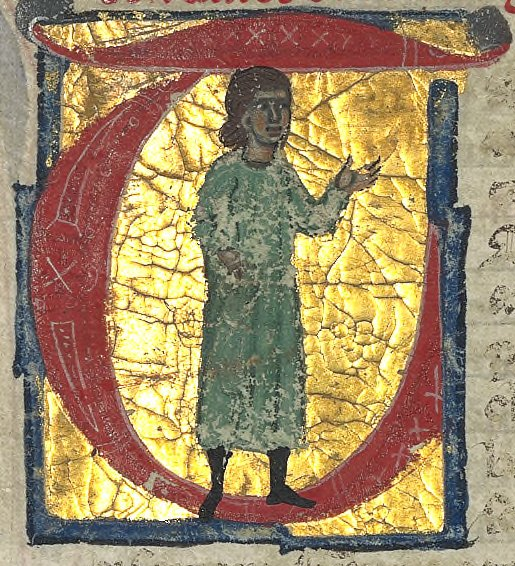
Sordello from a 13th-century manuscript

The margraves of Montferrat—Boniface I, William VI, and Boniface II—were patrons of Occitan poetry. Among the Genoese troubadours were Lanfranc Cigala, Calega Panzan, Jacme Grils, and Bonifaci Calvo. Genoa was also the place of the genesis of the podestà-troubadour phenomenon: men who served in several cities as podestàs on behalf of either the Guelph or Ghibelline party and who wrote political poetry in Occitan. Rambertino Buvalelli was the first podestà-troubadour and in Genoa there were the Guelphs Luca Grimaldi and Luchetto Gattilusio and the Ghibellines Perceval and Simon Doria.

Perhaps the most important aspect of the Italian troubadour phenomenon was the production of chansonniers and the composition of vidas and razos. Uc de Saint Circ undertook to author the entire razo corpus and a great many of the vidas. The most famous and influential Italian troubadour was Sordello.

The troubadours had a connection with the rise of a school of poetry in the Kingdom of Sicily. In 1220 Obs de Biguli was present as a "singer" at the coronation of the Emperor Frederick II. Guillem Augier Novella before 1230 and Guilhem Figueira thereafter were important Occitan poets at Frederick's court. The Albigensian Crusade had devastated Languedoc and forced many troubadours of the area to flee to Italy, where an Italian tradition of papal criticism was begun.

=== Chivalric romance ===
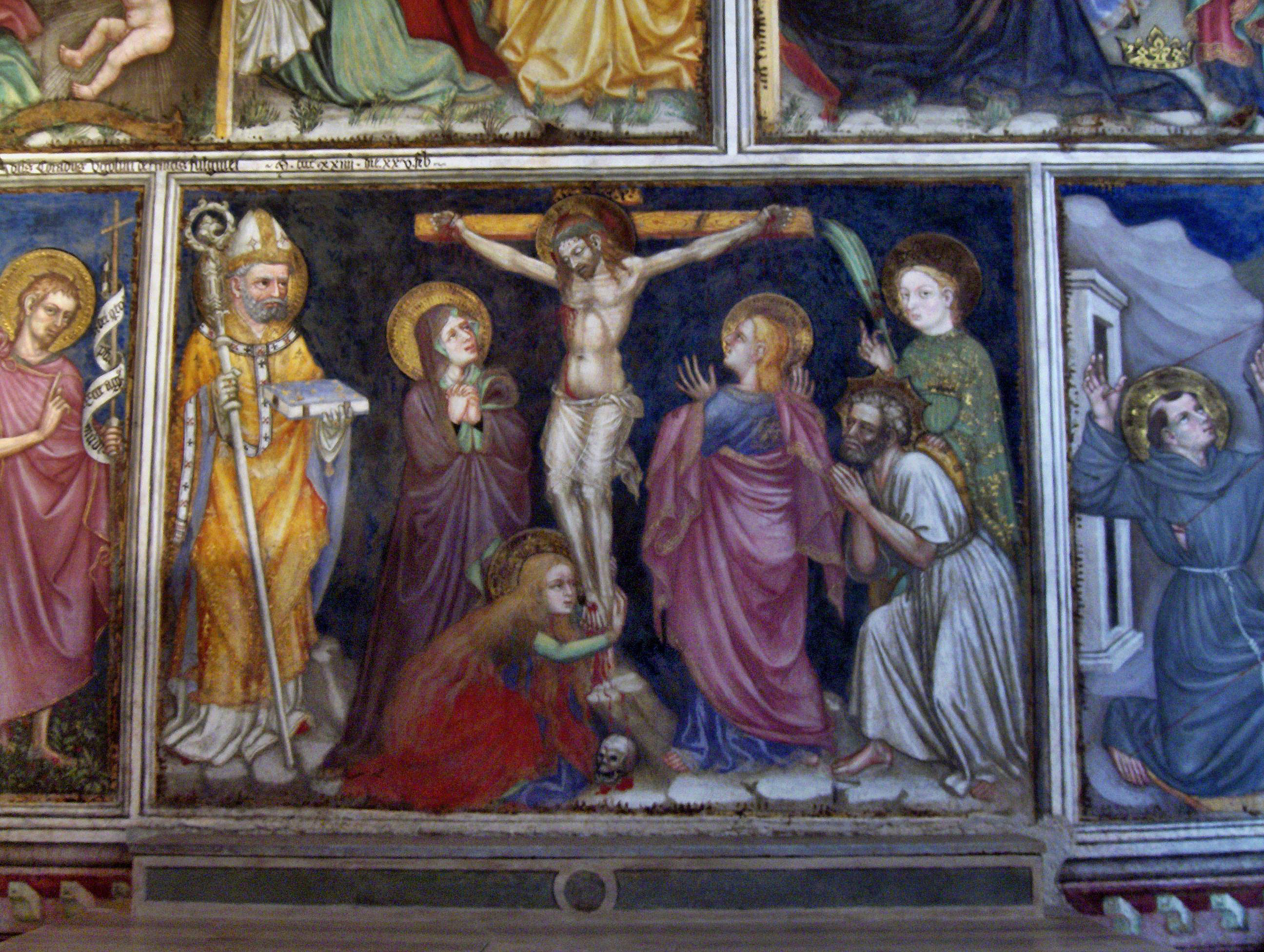
Jacobus de Voragine with the Golden Legend in his hand, fresco by Ottaviano Nelli, chapel of Palazzo Trinci, Foligno, Italy

The Historia de excidio Trojae, attributed to Dares Phrygius, claimed to be an eyewitness account of the Trojan War. Guido delle Colonne of Messina, one of the vernacular poets of the Sicilian school, composed the Historia destructionis Troiae. In his poetry, Guido was an imitator of the Provençals, but in this book he converted Benoît de Sainte-Maure's French romance into what sounded like serious Latin history.

Much the same thing occurred with other great legends. Quilichino of Spoleto wrote couplets about the legend of Alexander the Great. Europe was full of the legend of King Arthur, but the Italians contented themselves with translating and abridging French romances. Jacobus de Voragine, while collecting his Golden Legend (1260), remained a historian. Farfa, Marsicano, and other scholars translated Aristotle, the precepts of the school of Salerno, and the travels of Marco Polo, linking the classics and the Renaissance.

At the same time, epic poetry was written in a mixed language, a dialect of Italian based on French: hybrid words exhibited a treatment of sounds according to the rules of both languages, had French roots with Italian endings, and were pronounced according to Italian or Latin rules. Examples include the chansons de geste, Macaire, the Entrée d'Espagne written by Anonymous of Padua, the Prise de Pampelune, written by Niccolò of Verona, and others. All this preceded the appearance of purely Italian literature.

== 14th century: the roots of Renaissance ==
=== Dante ===
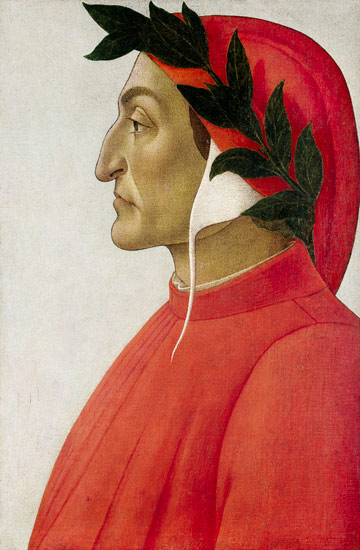
Profile portrait of Dante Alighieri, by Sandro Botticelli

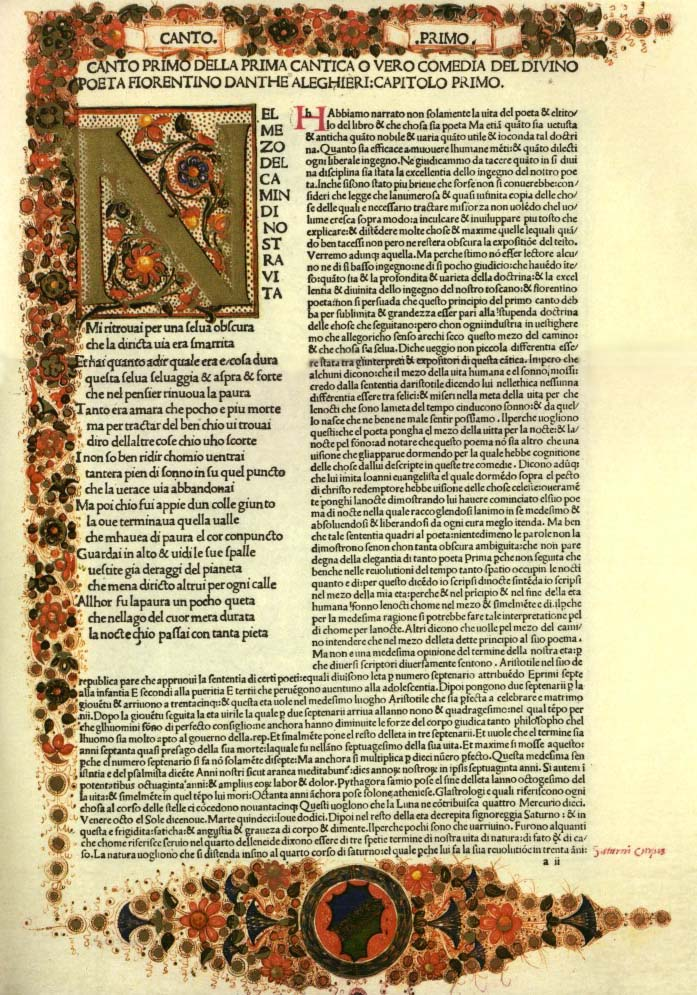
First page of an early printed edition of Dante's Divine Comedy

Dante Alighieri, one of the greatest of Italian poets, also shows these lyrical tendencies. In 1293 he wrote La Vita Nuova, in which he idealizes love. It is a collection of poems to which Dante added narration and explication. Everything is sensual, aerial, and heavenly, and the real Beatrice is supplanted by an idealized vision of her, losing her human nature and becoming a representation of the divine. The Divine Comedy tells of the poet's travels through the three realms of the dead—Hell, Purgatory, and Paradise—accompanied by the Latin poet Virgil. An allegorical meaning hides under the literal one of this great epic. Dante, travelling through Hell, Purgatory, and Paradise, symbolizes mankind aiming at the double object of temporal and eternal happiness. The forest where the poet loses himself symbolizes sin. The mountain illuminated by the sun is the universal monarchy. Envy is Florence, Pride is the house of France, and Avarice is the papal court. Virgil represents reason and the empire. Beatrice is the symbol of the supernatural aid mankind must have to attain the supreme end, which is God.

The merit of the poem lies is the individual art of the poet, the classic art transfused for the first time into a Romance form. Whether he describes nature, analyses passions, curses the vices or sings hymns to the virtues, Dante is notable for the grandeur and delicacy of his art. He took the materials for his poem from theology, philosophy, history, and mythology, but especially from his own passions, from hatred and love. The Divine Comedy ranks among the finest works of world literature.

=== Petrarch ===
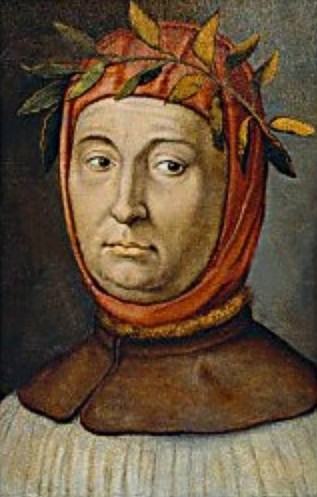
Petrarch

Petrarch was the first humanist, and he was at the same time the first modern lyric poet. His career was long and tempestuous. He lived for many years at Avignon, cursing the corruption of the papal court; he travelled through nearly the whole of Europe; he corresponded with emperors and popes, and he was considered the most important writer of his time. Petrarch's lyric verse is quite different, not only from that of the Provençal troubadours and the Italian poets before him, but also from the lyrics of Dante. Petrarch is a psychological poet, who examines all his feelings and renders them with an art of exquisite sweetness. The lyrics of Petrarch are no longer transcendental like Dante's, but keep entirely within human limits.

The Canzoniere includes a few political poems, one supposed to be addressed to Cola di Rienzi and several sonnets against the court of Avignon. These are remarkable for their vigour of feeling, and also for showing that, compared to Dante, Petrarch had a sense of a broader Italian consciousness.

=== Boccaccio ===
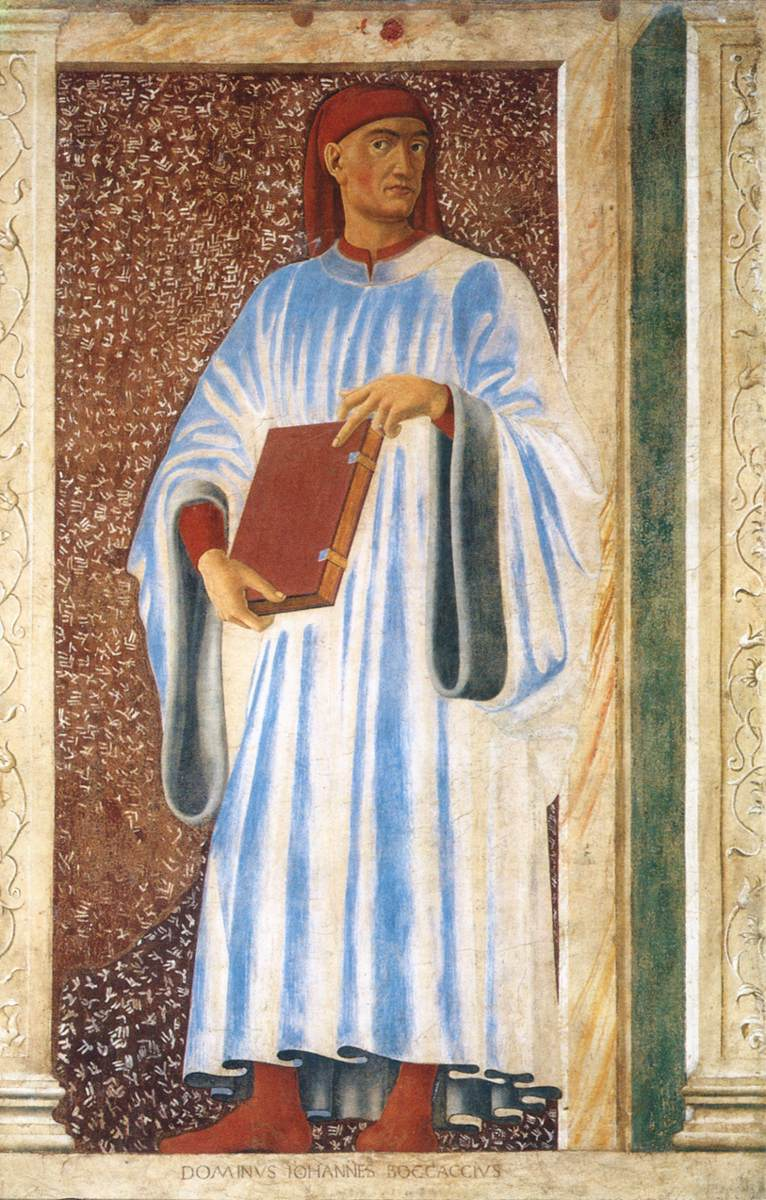
Giovanni Boccaccio presenting the Decamerone, depicted by Andrea del Castagno in a fresco preserved in the Uffizi

Giovanni Boccaccio had the same enthusiastic love of antiquity and the same worship for the new Italian literature as Petrarch. He was the first to put together a Latin translation of the Iliad and, in 1375, the Odyssey. His classical learning was shown in the work De genealogia deorum; as A. H. Heeren said, it is an encyclopaedia of mythological knowledge; and it was the precursor of the humanist movement of the 15th century. Boccaccio was also the first historian of women in his De mulieribus claris, and the first to tell the story of the great unfortunates in his De casibus virorum illustrium. He continued and perfected former geographical investigations in his De montibus, silvis, fontibus, lacubus, fluminibus, stagnis, et paludibus, et de nominibus maris, for which he made use of Vibius Sequester.

He did not invent the octave stanza, but was the first to use it in a work of length and artistic merit, his Teseide, the oldest Italian romantic poem. The Filostrato relates the loves of Troiolo and Griseida (Troilus and Cressida). The Ninfale fiesolano tells the love story of the nymph Mesola and the shepherd Africo. The Amorosa Visione, a poem in triplets, doubtless owed its origin to the Divine Comedy. The Ameto is a mixture of prose and poetry, and is the first Italian pastoral romance. Boccaccio became famous principally for the Italian work, Decamerone, a collection of a hundred novels, related by a party of men and women who retired to a villa near Florence to escape the plague in 1348. Novel writing, so abundant in the preceding centuries, especially in France, now for the first time assumed an artistic shape. The style of Boccaccio tends to the imitation of Latin, but in him, prose first took the form of elaborated art. Over and above this, in the Decamerone, Boccaccio is a delineator of character and an observer of passions. Much has been written about the sources of the novels of the Decamerone. Probably Boccaccio made use both of written and of oral sources.

== 15th century: Renaissance humanism ==
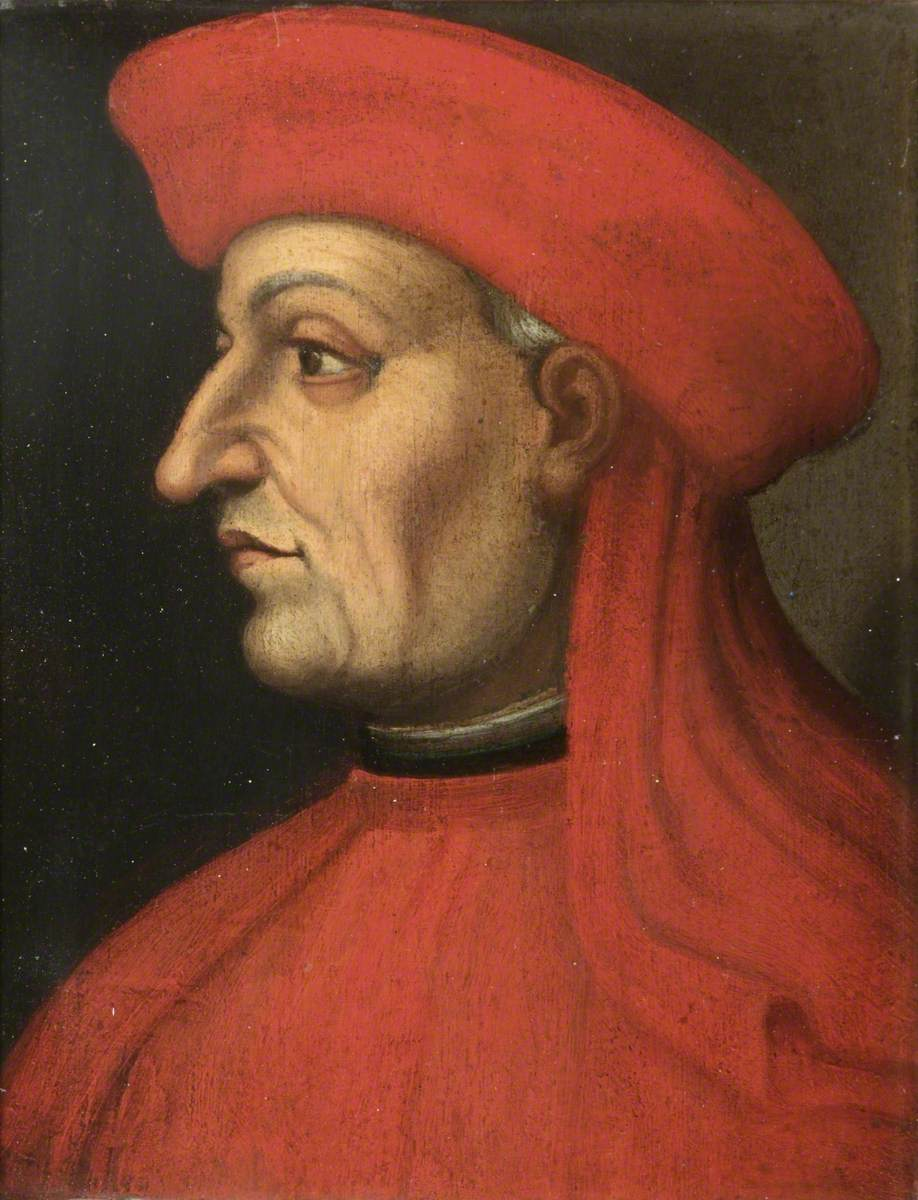
Leonardo Bruni

Renaissance humanism developed during the 14th and the beginning of the 15th centuries, and was a response to the challenge of Mediæval scholastic education, emphasizing practical, pre-professional and -scientific studies. Scholasticism focused on preparing men to be doctors, lawyers or professional theologians, and was taught from approved textbooks in logic, natural philosophy, medicine, law and theology. The main centers of humanism were Florence and Naples.

Rather than train professionals in jargon and strict practice, humanists sought to create a citizenry (including, sometimes, women) able to speak and write with eloquence and clarity. This was to be accomplished through the study of the studia humanitatis, today known as the humanities: grammar, rhetoric, history, poetry and moral philosophy. Early humanists, such as Petrarch, Coluccio Salutati and Leonardo Bruni, were great collectors of antique manuscripts.

In Italy, the humanist educational program won rapid acceptance and, by the mid-15th century, many of the upper classes had received humanist educations. There were five 15th-century humanist popes, one of whom, Aeneas Silvius Piccolomini (Pius II), was a prolific author and wrote a treatise on "The Education of Boys".

=== Literature in the Florence of the Medici ===
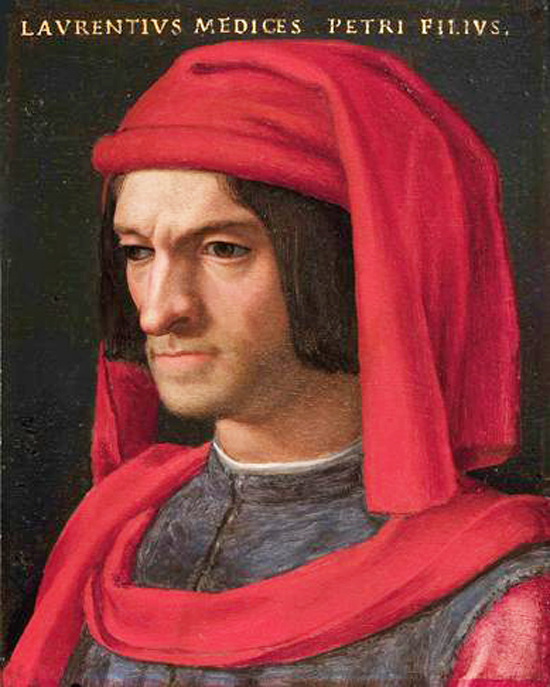
Portrait of Lorenzo de' Medici by Agnolo Bronzino at the Uffizi, Florence

Leone Battista Alberti, the learned Greek and Latin scholar, wrote in the vernacular, and Vespasiano da Bisticci, while he was constantly absorbed in Greek and Latin manuscripts, wrote the Vite di uomini illustri, valuable for their historical contents, and rivalling the best works of the 14th century in their candour and simplicity. Andrea da Barberino wrote the beautiful prose of the Reali di Francia, giving a coloring of romanità to the chivalrous romances. Belcari and Girolamo Benivieni returned to the mystic idealism of earlier times.

But it is in Cosimo de' Medici and Lorenzo de' Medici, from 1430 to 1492, that the influence of Florence on the Renaissance is particularly seen. Lorenzo de' Medici gave to his poetry the colors of the most pronounced realism as well as of the loftiest idealism, who passes from the Platonic sonnet to the impassioned triplets of the Amori di Venere, from the grandiosity of the Salve to Nencia and to Beoni, from the Canto carnascialesco to the lauda.

Next to Lorenzo comes Poliziano, who also united the ancient and the modern, the popular and the classical style. In his Rispetti and in his Ballate the freshness of imagery and the plasticity of form are inimitable. A Greek scholar, Poliziano wrote Italian verses with dazzling colours; the elegance of the Greek sources pervaded his art in all its varieties, in the Orfeo as well as the Stanze per la giostra.

A completely new style of poetry arose, the Canto carnascialesco. These were a type of choral songs, which were accompanied by symbolic masquerades, common in Florence at the carnival. They were written in a metre like that of the ballate; and for the most part, they were put into the mouth of a party of workmen and tradesmen, who, with not very chaste allusions, sang the praises of their art. These triumphs and masquerades were directed by Lorenzo himself. In the evening, there set out into the city large companies on horseback, playing and singing these songs. There are some by Lorenzo himself, which surpass all the others in their mastery of art. That entitled Bacco ed Arianna is the most famous.

== 16th century ==
=== Renaissance and Reformation ===
==== England ====
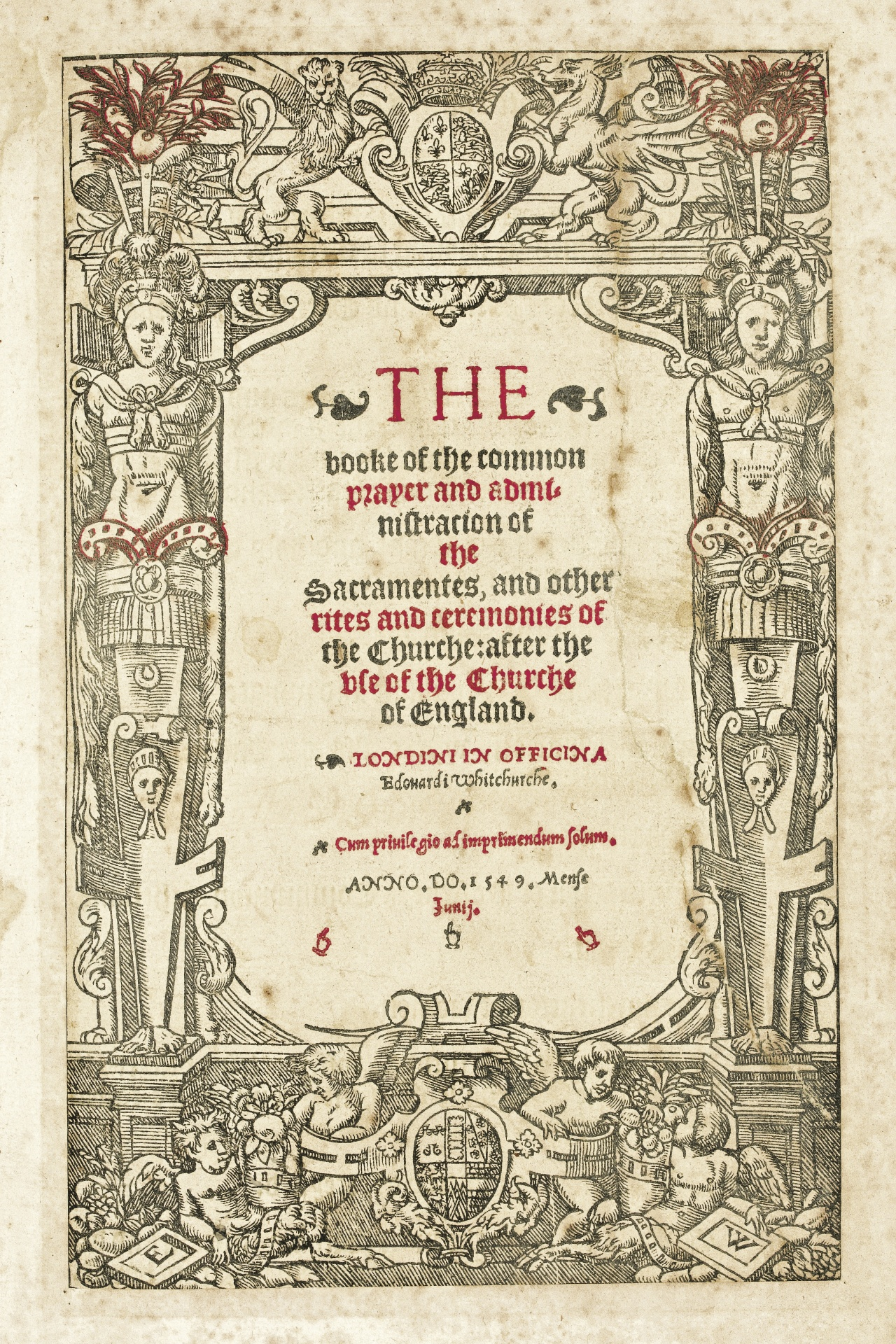
The first Book of Common Prayer, published 1549

Early modern England was the time of reformation, in which a "Protestant aesthetic" was developed, while the Church of England attempted to separate their notoriety with the Pope and move away from the teachings of the Roman Catholic Church. Johannine literature, being "hymnic, densely troped and symbolic, structured, inspired", became the inspiration for many poets of the period. A group of poets bloomed from this reformation, the rejection of the Pope and moving away from Roman Catholic Church. Amongst these were the most significant John Donne, George Herbert and Thomas Traherne, and constituted a group of poets known as "revelatory poetics".

The narrative which grew more prominent in English literature due to this movement towards Johannine theology incorporated an increase of spiritual themes, with "supernatural forces" and an "enchantment narrative" guiding the writings of the time. Johannine theology focused on the "divine" nature of Christ and disregards the materialistic and human aspect acknowledged in Catholic texts. It has been argued that the writings of Saint John the Evangelist, which was considered an integral part of Johannine theology, coincided with Pauline theology during the early modern era to hold influence over the English literature of the time. Author Paul Cefalu claims this form of "high Christology" was seen in the writings of John Donne, when he states that the "Gospel of Saint John containes all Divinity". However, it is argued by author P. M. Oliver that the theology which was indoctrinated in the poetry of revelatory poets including John Donne was expanded on and created by the poets themselves.

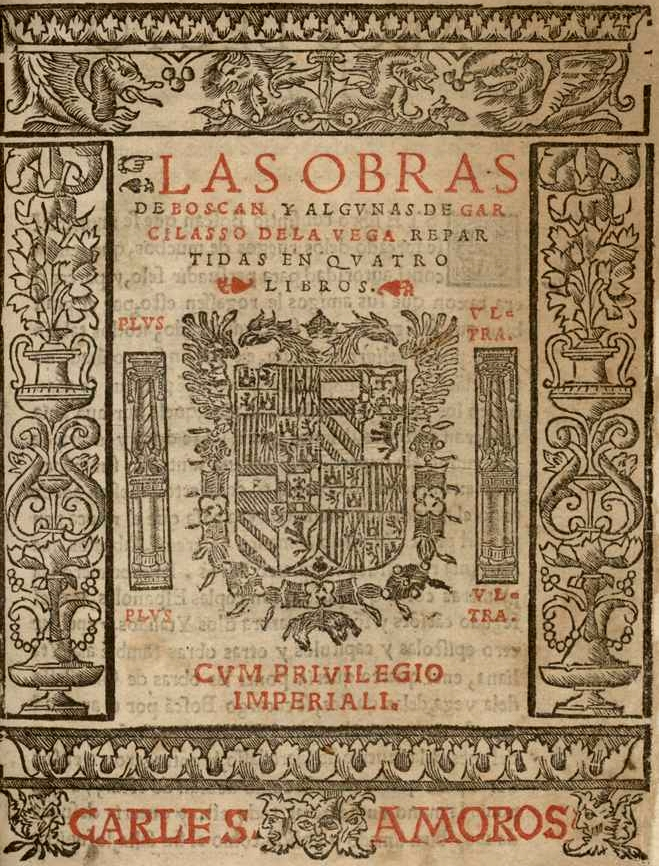
Cover of The works of Boscán and Garcilaso de la Vega in 4 books, published in 1543

Prominent forms of literature which shaped and contributed to this era of Reformation include significantly structured prose and poetry, including the Spenserian stanza; the sonnet, which is a form of poem easily distinguishable by its fourteen-line form with a structured rhyme format; and the pastoral mode, a genre of literature which is significantly attributed to English poet Edmund Spenser, who created collections of poetry which portrays an idealistic version of rural living. Spenser has been "dubbed 'the English Virgil'" due to his influence on this particular genre.

Significant texts from 16th-century early modern England were primarily religious in context and include:

- The Great Bible, edited by Myles Coverdale.
- The first Book of Common Prayer, published on January 15, 1549, after being accepted by the House of Lords. The book, due to the political and authoritative changes of the time of the reformation, attempted to provide a "compromise" between Protestant and Roman Catholic beliefs. The author of the book, Thomas Cranmer, assisted in creating a standard version of the modern English language.

==== Italy ====
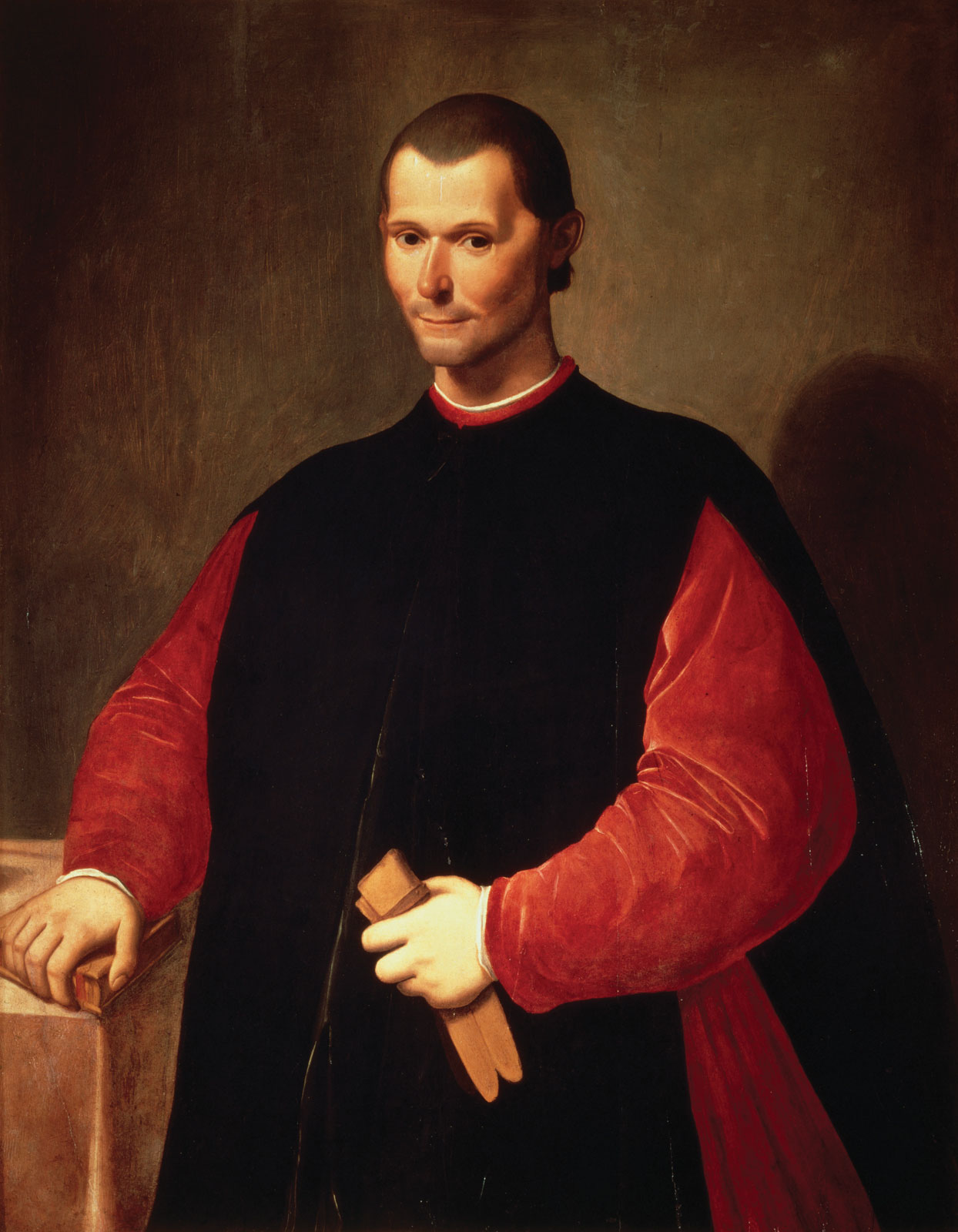
Portrait of Niccolò Machiavelli by Santi di Tito

Niccolò Machiavelli and Francesco Guicciardini were the chief originators of the science of history. Machiavelli's principal works are the Istorie fiorentine, the Discorsi sulla prima deca di Tito Livio, the Arte della guerra and the Principe. His merit consists in having emphasized the experimental side of the study of political action by having observed facts, studied histories and drawn principles from them. His history is sometimes inexact in facts; it is rather a political than a historical work.

Guicciardini was very observant and endeavoured to reduce his observations to a science. His Storia d'Italia, which extends from the death of Lorenzo de' Medici to 1534, is full of political wisdom, is skillfully arranged in its parts, gives a lively picture of the character of the persons it treats of, and is written in a grand style. Machiavelli and Guicciardini may be considered distinguished historians as well as originators of the science of history founded on observation.

Inferior to them were Jacopo Nardi (a just and faithful historian and a virtuous man, who defended the rights of Florence against the Medici before Charles V), Benedetto Varchi, Giambattista Adriani, Bernardo Segni, and, outside Tuscany, Camillo Porzio, who related the Congiura de baroni and the history of Italy from 1547 to 1552; Angelo di Costanzo, Pietro Bembo, Paolo Paruta, and others.

Ludovico Ariosto's Orlando furioso was a continuation of Boiardo's Innamorato. His characteristic is that he assimilated the romance of chivalry into the style and models of classicism. Romantic Ariosto was an artist only for the love of his art; his epic.

=== Golden Age ===
==== Spain ====
The Spanish Golden Age spanned over the course of the 16th century and was a time of development and acceleration in the arts and literature in Spain. This acceleration of poetry, drama and prose forms of literature was partly due to the increase in contact that Spain gained to other European nations including Italy. During this time, a prominent Spanish poet arose named Garcilaso de la Vega. He utilised literary devices seen in foreign nations within his work, and was able to, therefore, replace the stanza forms originally used in Spain with Italian meters and stanza forms. The poet was influenced by Petrarchan imagery and the works of Virgil, and was used as inspiration by subsequent poets of the time. Garcilaso integrated a variety of mythological allusions into his works, in which he took inspiration from the Italian Renaissance of the mid-16th century.

== 17th century ==
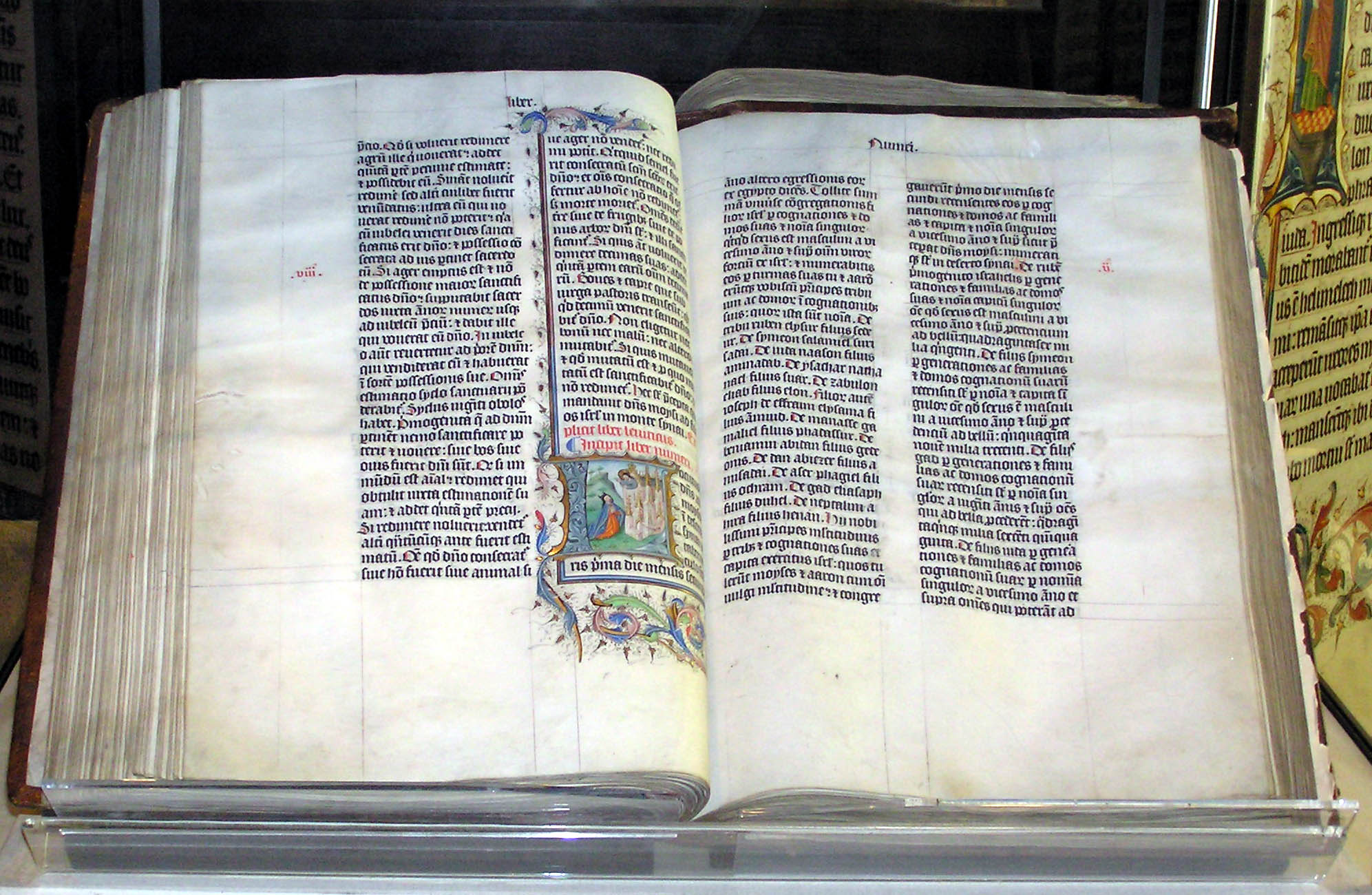
The Bible, displayed in Malmesbury Abbey, Wiltshire, England

Prose and poetic literature within western regions, most prominently in England during the early modern era, had a distinct Biblical influence which only began to be rejected during the Enlightenment period of the 18th century. European poetry during the 17th century tended to meditate on or reference the scriptures and teachings of the Bible, an example being orator George Herbert's "The Holy Scriptures (II)", in which Herbert relies heavily on biblical ligatures to create his sonnets.

=== Jacobean era ===
==== England ====
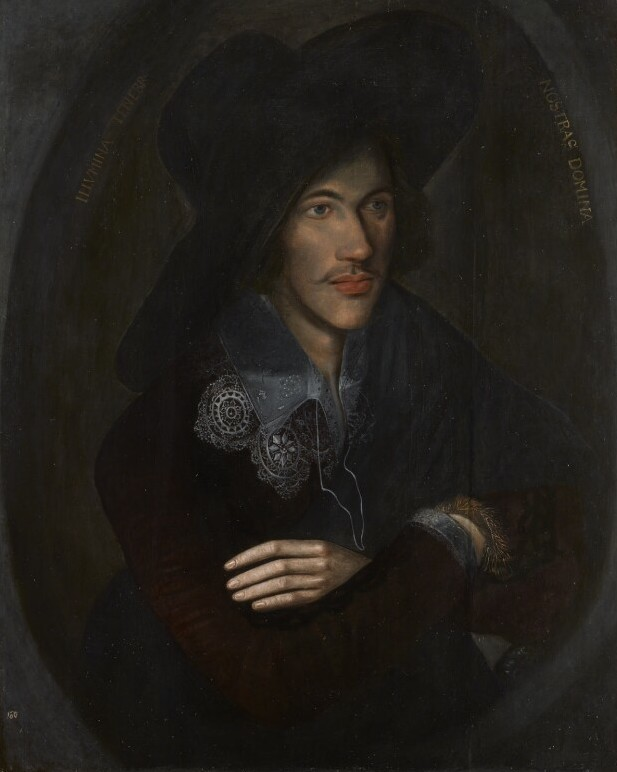
Portrait of English metaphysical John Donne

The Jacobean period of 17th-century England gave birth to a group of metaphysic literary figures, metaphysical referring to a branch of philosophy which tries to bring meaning to and explain reality using broader and larger concepts. In order to do this, the use of literary features including conceits was common, in which the writer makes obscure comparisons in order to convey a message or persuade a point.

The term metaphysics was coined by poet John Dryden, and during 1779 its meaning was extended to represent a group of poets of the time, then called "metaphysical poets". Major poets of the time included John Donne, Andrew Marvell and George Herbert. These poets used wit and high intellectual standards while drawing from nature to reveal insights about emotion and rejected the romantic attributes of the Elizabethan period to birth a more analytical and introspective form of writing. A common literary device during the 17th century was the use of metaphysical conceits, in which the poet uses "unorthodox language" to describe a relatable concept. It is beneficial when trying to bring light to concepts that are difficult to explain with more common imagery.

John Donne was a prominent metaphysical poet of the 17th century. Donne's poetry explored the pleasures of life through strong use of conceits and emotive language. Donne adopted a more simplistic vernacular compared to the common Petrarchan diction, with imagery derived mainly from God. Donne was known for the metaphysical conceits integrated in his poetry. He used themes of religion, death and love to inspire the conceits he constructed. A famous conceit is observed in his well-known poem "The Flea" in which the flea is utilised to describe the bond between Donne and his lover, explaining how just as multiple bloods are within one flea, their bond is inseparable.

=== Italy ===
The Treaty of Cateau-Cambrésis in 1559 ushered in centuries of foreign domination over Italy. This period is known in the history of Italian literature as the Secentismo. Its writers deployed complex, far-fetched comparisons, paradoxes, and paralogical statements (acutezze) in order to exhibit the writer's genius and ingenuity (ingegno), and provoke wonder (meraviglia) in the reader.

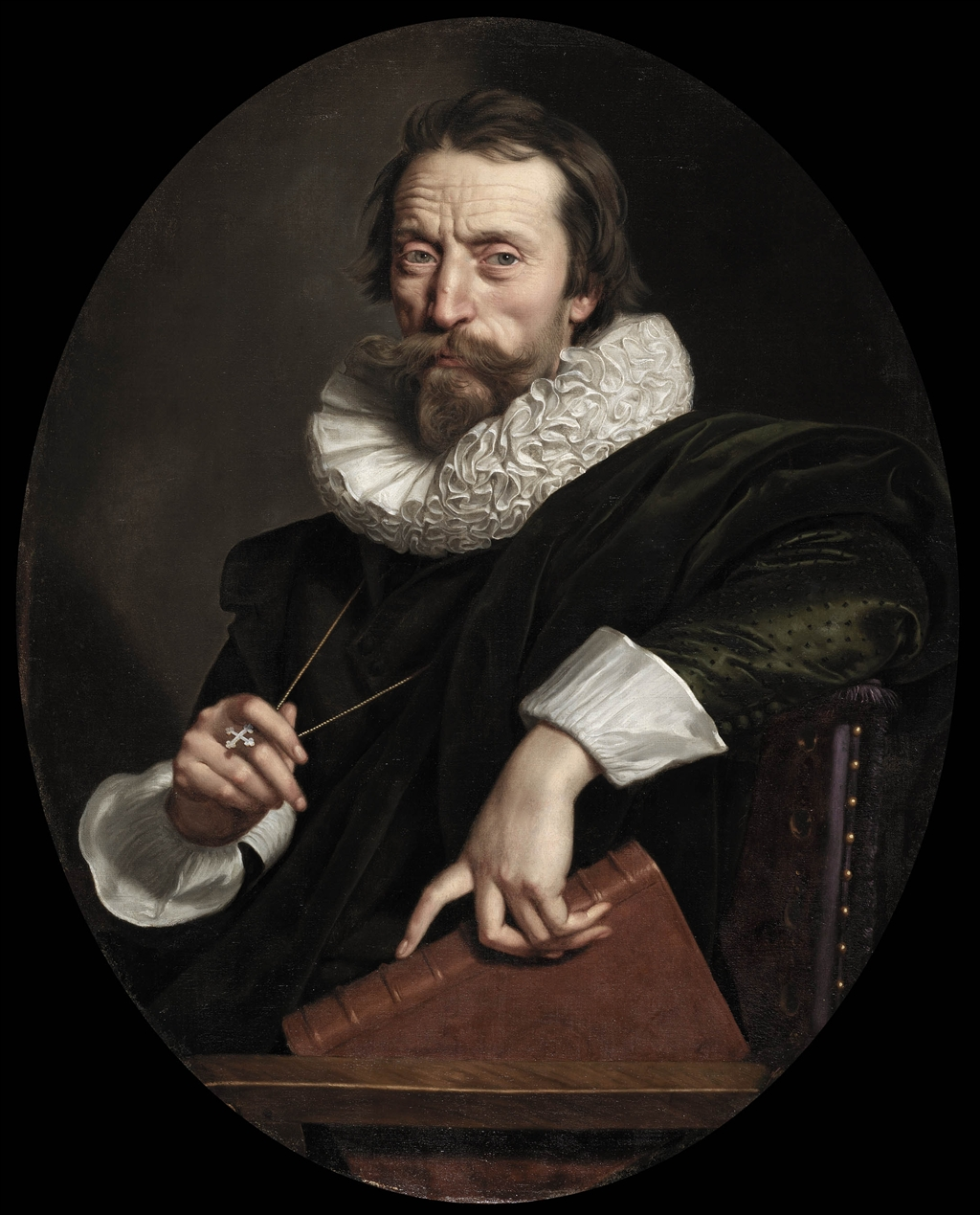
Portrait of Giambattista Marino by Frans Pourbus the Younger

At the head of the school of the Secentisti was Giambattista Marino, especially known for his epic poem, L'Adone. Marino himself, as he declared in the Preface to La lira, wished to be a new leader and model for other poets. Second, he wished to surprise and shock the reader through the marvellous (meraviglioso) and the unusual (peregrino). The qualities he and his followers most valued were ingegno and acutezza, as demonstrated through far-fetched metaphors and conceits, often ones that would assault the reader's senses. This meant being ready, in fact eager, to break literary rules and precepts. Marino and his followers mixed tradition and innovation: they worked with existing poetic forms, notably the sonnet, the sestina, the canzone, the madrigal, and less frequently the ottava rima, but developed new, more fluid structures and line lengths. They also treated hallowed themes (love, woman, nature), but they made the senses and sensuality the dominant element. The passions, which had attracted the attention of Paduan writers and theorists in the mid-16th century as well as of Tasso, take centre stage, and are depicted in extreme forms in representations of subjects such as martyrdom, sacrifice, heroic grandeur, and abysmal existential fear. The Marinists also take up new themes—notably the visual and musical arts and indoor scenes—with a new repertoire of references embracing modern scientific advances, other specialized branches of knowledge, and exotic locations and animals. There are similarities with Tasso, but the balance between form and content in Tasso is deliberately unbalanced by Marino and his followers, who very often forget all concerns about unity in their poems (witness the Adone). The most striking difference, however, is the intensified role of metaphor. Marino and his followers looked for metaphors that would arrest the reader by suggesting a likeness between two apparently disparate things, thus producing startling metamorphoses, conceits (concetti), and far-fetched images that send sparks flying as they create a friction between two apparently diverse objects. The extent to which this new metaphorical freedom reveals a new world is still open to critical debate. In some ways it seems to make poetry a form of intellectual game or puzzle; in others it suggests new ways of perceiving and describing reality, parallel to the mathematical measures employed by Galileo and his followers in the experimental sciences.

Almost all the poets of the 17th century were more or less influenced by Marinism. Many secentisti felt the influence of another poet, Gabriello Chiabrera. Enamoured of the Greeks, he made new metres, especially in imitation of Pindar, treating of religious, moral, historical, and amatory subjects. Carlo Alessandro Guidi was the chief representative of an early Pindarizing current based on imitation of Chiabrera as second only to Petrarch in Italian poetry. He was extolled by both Gravina and Crescimbeni, who edited his poetry (1726), and imitated by Parini. Alfieri attributed his own self-discovery to the power of Guidi's verse. Fulvio Testi was another major exponent of the Hellenizing strand of Baroque classicism, combining Horatianism with the imitation of Anacreon and Pindar. His most important and interesting writings are not, however, his lyrics (only collected in 1653), but his extensive correspondence, which is a major document of Baroque politics and letters.

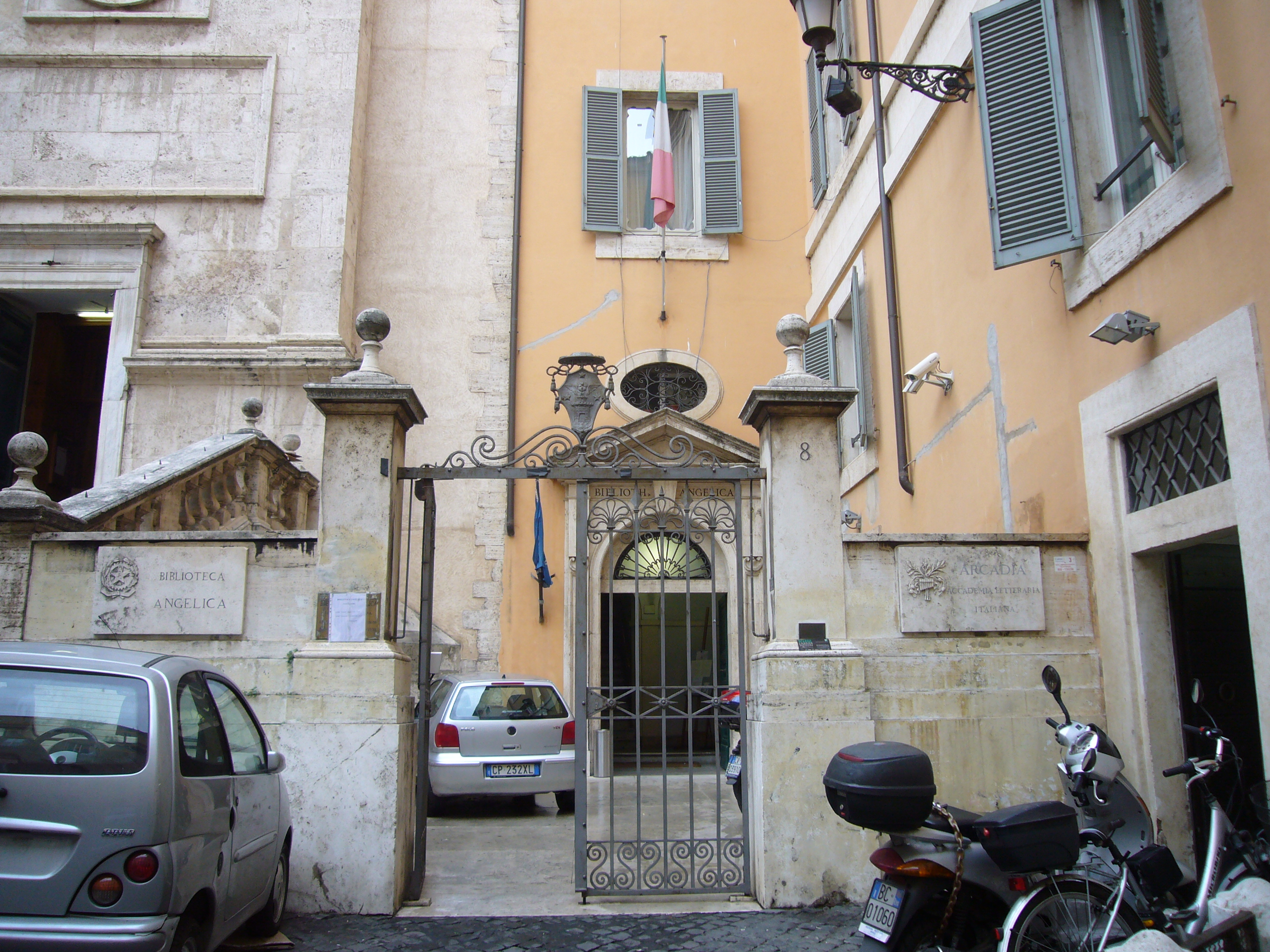
The Accademia dell' Arcadia headquarters in Piazza Sant'Agostino in Rome

Marino's work, with its sensual metaphorical language and its non-epic structure and morality, stirred up a debate over the rival claims of classical purity and sobriety on the one hand and the excesses of marinism on the other. The debate went on until it was finally decided in favour of the classical by the Accademia dell'Arcadia, whose view of the matter prevailed in Italian criticism well into the 20th century. The Accademia dell'Arcadia was founded by Giovanni Mario Crescimbeni and Gian Vincenzo Gravina in 1690. The Arcadia was so called because its chief aim was to imitate the simplicity of the ancient shepherds who were supposed to have lived in Arcadia in the golden age. The poems of the Arcadians are made up of sonnets, madrigals, canzonette and blank verse. The one who most distinguished himself among the sonneteers was Felice Zappi. Among the authors of songs, Paolo Rolli was illustrious. Carlo Innocenzo Frugoni was the best known. The members of the Arcadia were almost exclusively men, but at least one woman, Maria Antonia Scalera Stellini, was elected on poetical merits. Vincenzo da Filicaja had a lyric talent, particularly in the songs about Vienna besieged by the Turks.

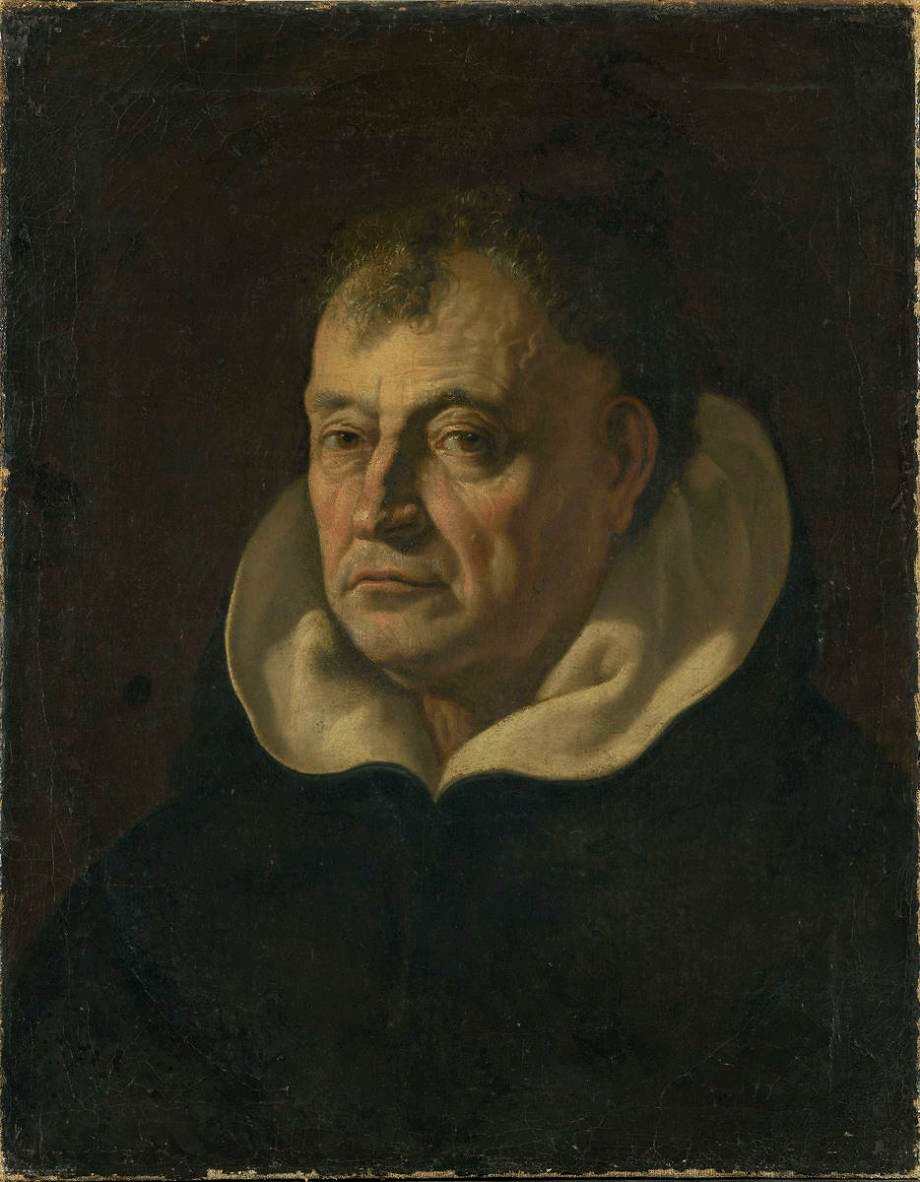
Portrait of Tommaso Campanella by Francesco Cozza

The philosopher, theologian, astrologer, and poet Tommaso Campanella is an interesting albeit isolated figure in 17th-century Italian literature. His Poesie, published in 1622, consist of eighty-nine poems in various metrical forms. Some are autobiographical, but all are stamped with a seriousness and directness which bypasses the literary fashions of his day. He wrote in Latin on dialectics, rhetoric, poetics, and historiography, as well as the Italian Del senso delle cose e della magia, composed in 1604 and published in 1620. In this fascinating work, influenced by the teachings of Bernardino Telesio, Campanella imagines the world as a living statue of God, in which all aspects of reality have meaning and sense. With its animism and sensuality this vision foreshadows in many ways the views of Daniello Bartoli and Tesauro. Campanella's theological work, closely connected with his philosophical writings, includes the Atheismus triumphatus and the thirty-volume Theologia (1613–24). His most famous work, and the one that brings together all his interests, is La città del sole, first drafted in 1602 in Italian and then later translated into Latin in 1613 and 1631. In it a Genoese sailor from Christopher Columbus' crew describes the ideal state of the City of the Sun ruled over in both temporal and spiritual matters by the Prince Priest, called Sun or Metaphysician. Under him there are three ministers: Power (concerned with war and peace), Wisdom (concerned with science and art, all written down in one book), and Love (concerned with procreation and education of the citizens of the Sun). The life of the citizens is based on a system of communism: all property is held publicly, there are no families, no rights of inheritance, no marriage, and sexual relations are regulated by the state. Everyone has his or her function in the society, and certain duties are required of all citizens. Education is the perfect training of the mind and the body, and it is radically opposed to the bookish and academic culture of Renaissance Italy: the objects of study should be not 'dead things' but nature and the mathematical and physical laws that govern the physical world. There are links here with the burgeoning modernism of the Querelle des anciens et des modernes, and with the methods and scientific aspirations of Galileo, whom Campanella defended in writing in 1616.

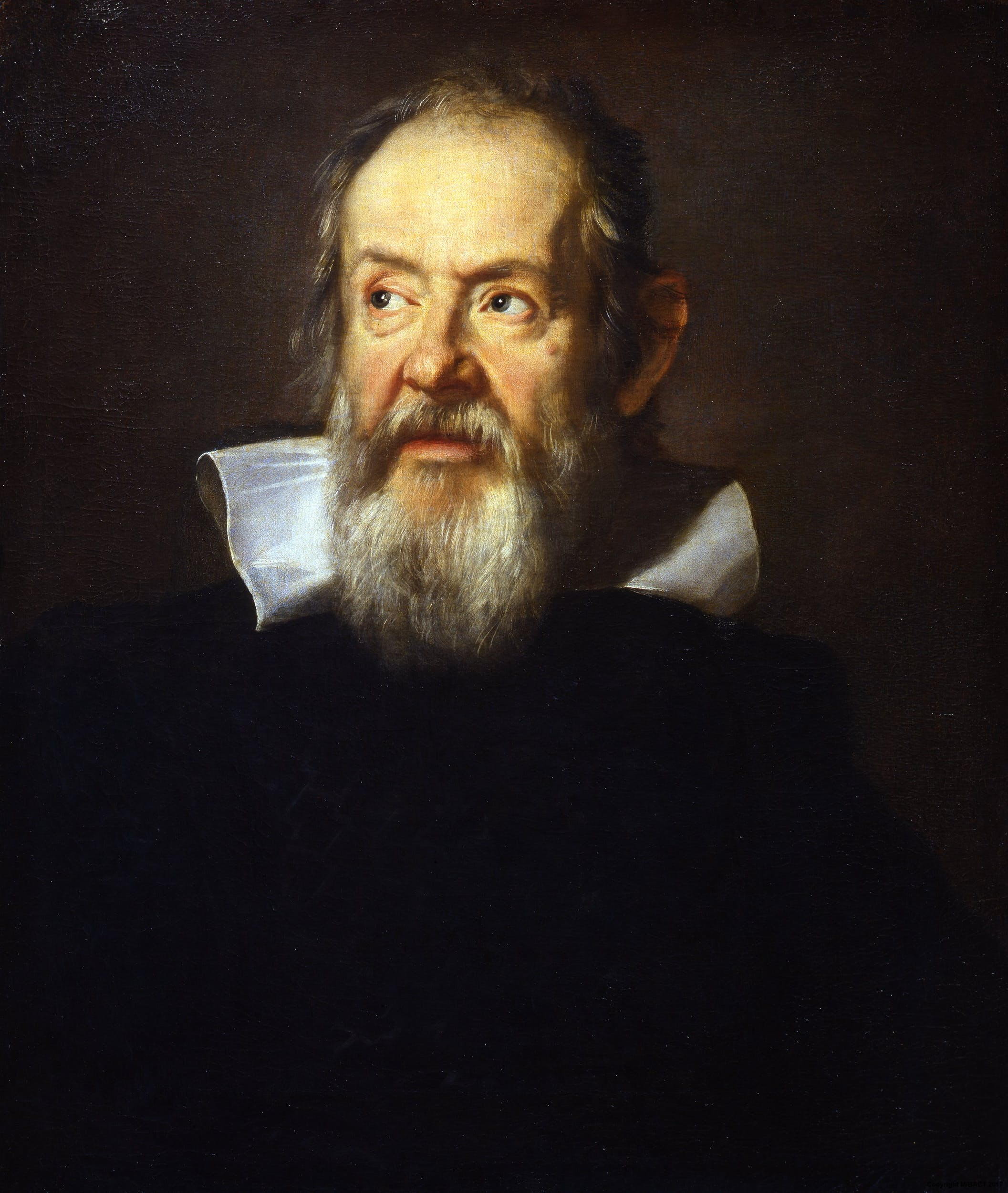
Portrait of Galileo Galilei by Justus Sustermans

The Lyncean Academy, the first and most famous of the scientific academies in Italy, was founded in 1603 in Rome by Federico Cesi. The academy dedicated its activities to the study of the natural and mathematical sciences and to the use of the experimental method associated with Galileo. The European dimension of the academy was characteristic of the founders' foresight and perspective: elections were made of foreign corresponding members, a practice that continues to this day. Members included Claudio Achillini, Pietro Della Valle, Galileo (from 1611), Francesco Sforza Pallavicino, Giambattista Della Porta (from 1610 ), and Filippo Salviati. Their work involved the large-scale publishing of scientific results based on direct observation, including Galileo's work on the moon's surface (1610) and his Assayer (1623). The academy defended Galileo at his trial in 1616, and played a crucial role in the early diffusion and promotion of his method.

The successor of the Lynceans was the Accademia del Cimento, founded in Florence in 1657. Never as organized as the Lynceans had been, it began as a meeting of disciples of Galileo, all of whom were interested in the progress of the experimental sciences. Official status came in 1657, when cardinal Leopoldo de' Medici sponsored the academy's foundation. With the motto 'provando e riprovando', the members, including Carlo Roberto Dati, Lorenzo Magalotti, and Vincenzo Viviani, set seriously about their work. Unlike Galileo, who tackled large-scale issues, the Cimento worked on a smaller scale. One of the legacies of the Cimento is the elegant Italian prose, capable of describing things accurately, that characterizes the Saggi di naturali esperienze edited by Magalotti and published in 1667.

Galileo occupied a conspicuous place in the history of letters. A devoted student of Ariosto, he seemed to transfuse into his prose the qualities of that great poet: clear and frank freedom of expression, precision and ease, and at the same time elegance. Paganino Bonafede in the Tesoro dei rustici gave many precepts in agriculture, beginning that type of georgic poetry later fully developed by Luigi Alamanni in his Coltivazione, by Girolamo Baruffaldi in the Canapajo, by Rucellai in Le Api, by Bartolomeo Lorenzi in the Coltivazione de' monti, and by Giambattista Spolverini in the Coltivazione del riso.

== 18th century ==
=== Enlightenment era ===
The Enlightenment era was a time of progression which spanned over the 18th century across many western countries. Upon recent years, this time of "enlightenment" was split into two degrees of progression, both a "moderate" and "radical" form, and was observed to be less harmonious across regions in its nature than previously thought.

Literature has been produced to comment on the different versions of "Enlightenment" that spawned across Europe during the 18th century. Henry Farnham stated in his book The Enlightenment in America that the "Moderate Enlightenment [...] preaches balance, order and religious compromise", whereas the "Revolutionary Enlightenment" attempted to "construct a new heaven and earth out of the destruction of the old".

==== Netherlands ====
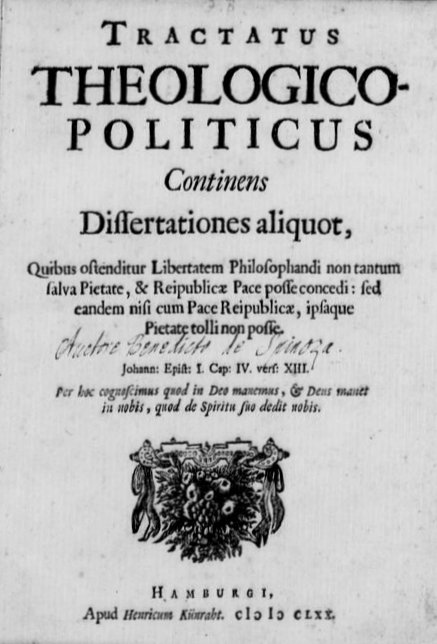
Tractatus Theologico-Politicus by Spinoza

Significant texts which shaped this literary period include Tractatus Theologico-Politicus, an anonymously published treatise in Amsterdam in which the author, Spinoza, rejected the Jewish and Christian religions for their lack of depth in teaching. Spinoza discussed higher levels of philosophy in his treatise, which he suggested was only understood by elitists. This text is one of many during this period which attributed to the increasing "anti-religious" support during the time of Enlightenment. Although the book held great influence, other writers of the time rejected Spinoza's views, including theologian Lambert van Valthuysen.

==== Italy ====
In the 18th century, the political condition of Italy began to improve, under Joseph II, Holy Roman Emperor, and his successors. These princes were influenced by philosophers, who in their turn felt the influence of a general movement of ideas at large in many parts of Europe, sometimes called The Enlightenment.

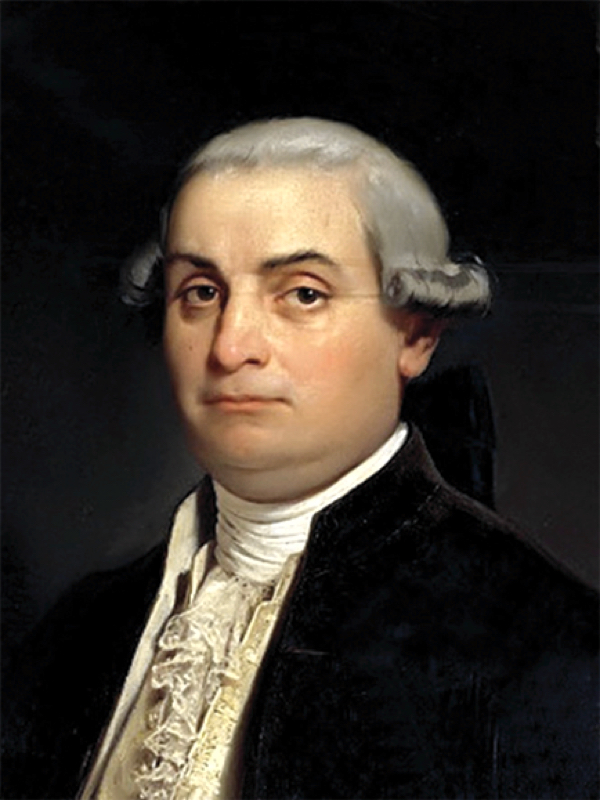
Portrait of Cesare Beccaria by Eliseo Sala

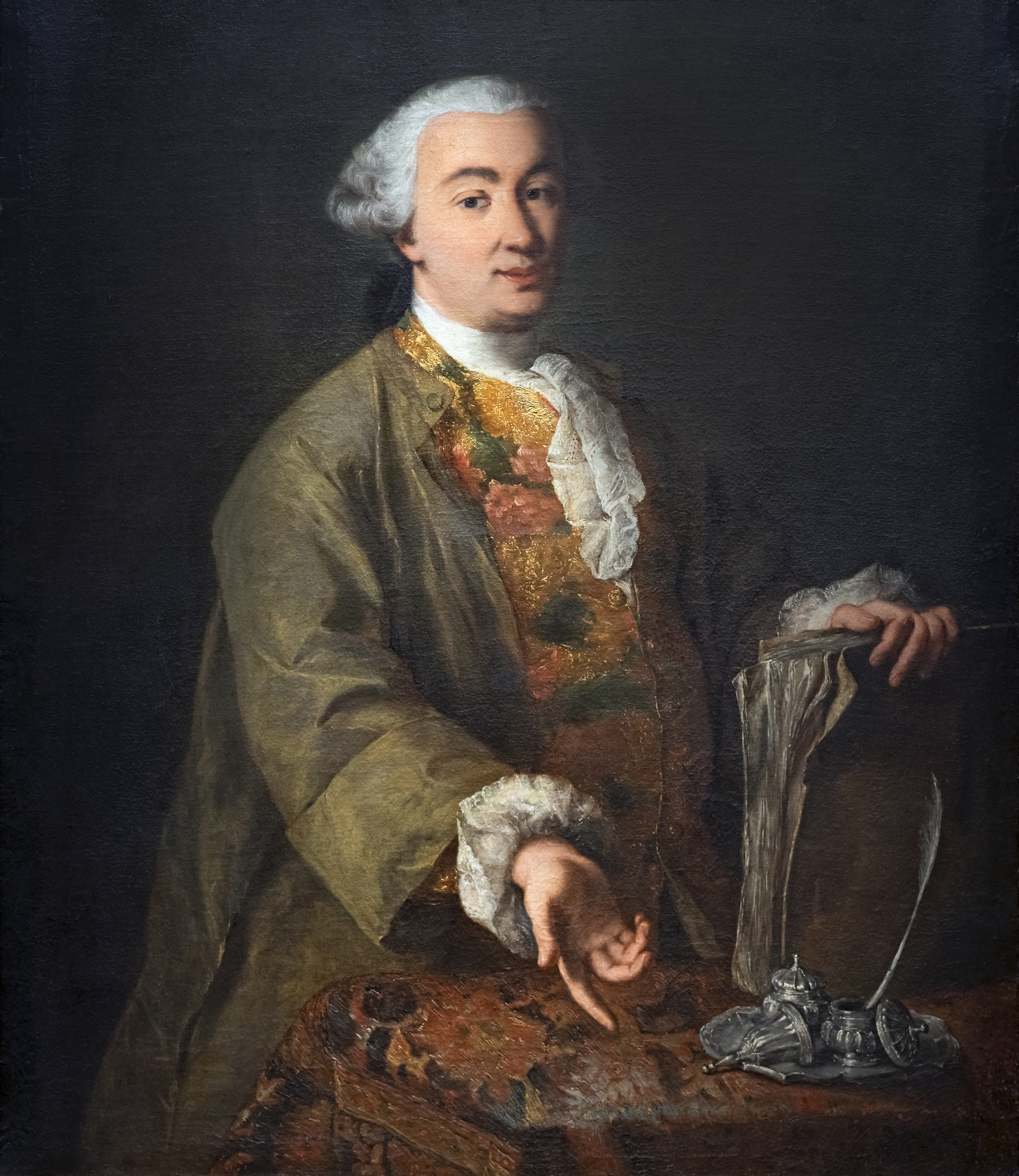
Portrait of Carlo Goldoni by Alessandro Longhi

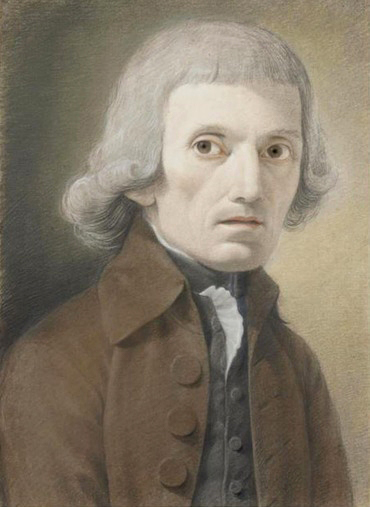
Portrait of Giuseppe Parini by Giuseppe Mazzola

Giambattista Vico showed the awakening of historical consciousness in Italy. In his Scienza nuova, he investigated the laws governing the progress of the human race, and according to which events develop. From the psychological study of man, he tried to infer the comune natura delle nazioni, i.e., the universal laws of history.

Lodovico Antonio Muratori, after having collected in his Rerum Italicarum scriptores the chronicles, biographies, letters and diaries of Italian history from 500 to 1500, and having discussed the most obscure historical questions in the Antiquitates Italicae medii aevi, wrote the Annali d'Italia, minutely narrating facts derived from authentic sources. Muratori's associates in his historical research were Scipione Maffei of Verona and Apostolo Zeno of Venice. In his Verona illustrata Maffei left a treasure of learning that was also an excellent historical monograph. Zeno added much to the erudition of literary history, both in his Dissertazioni Vossiane and in his notes to the Biblioteca dell'eloquenza italiana of Monsignore Giusto Fontanini. Girolamo Tiraboschi and Count Giammaria Mazzucchelli of Brescia devoted themselves to literary history.

While the new spirit of the times led to the investigation of historical sources, it also encouraged inquiry into the mechanism of economic and social laws. Ferdinando Galiani wrote on currency; Gaetano Filangieri wrote a Scienza della legislazione. Cesare Beccaria, in his Trattato dei delitti e delle pene, made a contribution to the reform of the penal system and promoted the abolition of torture.

The reforming movement sought to throw off the conventional and the artificial, and to return to truth. Apostolo Zeno and Pietro Metastasio had endeavoured to make melodrama and reason compatible. Metastasio gave fresh expression to the affections, a natural turn to the dialogue and some interest to the plot; if he had not fallen into constant unnatural overrefinement and mawkishness, and into frequent anachronisms, he might have been considered the most important writer of opera seria libretti and the first dramatic reformer of the 18th century.

Carlo Goldoni overcame resistance from the old popular form of comedy, with the masks of pantalone, of the doctor, harlequin, Brighella, etc., and created the comedy of character, following Molière's example. Many of his comedies were written in Venetian. His works include some of Italy's most famous and best-loved plays. Goldoni also wrote under the pen name and title Polisseno Fegeio, Pastor Arcade, which he claimed in his memoirs the "Arcadians of Rome" bestowed on him. One of his best-known works is the comic play Servant of Two Masters, which has been translated and adapted internationally numerous times.

The leading figure of the literary revival of the 18th century was Giuseppe Parini. In a collection of poems he published at twenty-three years of age, under the name of Ripano Eupilino, the poet shows his faculty of taking his scenes from real life, and in his satirical pieces he exhibits a spirit of outspoken opposition to his own times. Improving on the poems of his youth, he showed himself an innovator in his lyrics, rejecting at once Petrarchism, Secentismo and Arcadia. In the Odi the satirical note is already heard, but it comes out more strongly in Del giorno, which assumes major social and historical value. As an artist, going straight back to classical forms, he opened the way to the school of Vittorio Alfieri, Ugo Foscolo and Vincenzo Monti. As a work of art, the Giorno is sometimes a little hard and broken, as a protest against the Arcadian monotony.

The ideas behind the French Revolution of 1789 gave a special direction to Italian literature in the second half of the 18th century. Love of liberty and desire for equality created a literature aimed at national objects, seeking to improve the condition of the country by freeing it from the double yoke of political and religious despotism. The Italians who aspired to political redemption believed it inseparable from an intellectual revival, and thought that this could only be effected by a reunion with ancient classicism. This was a repetition of what had occurred in the first half of the 15th century.

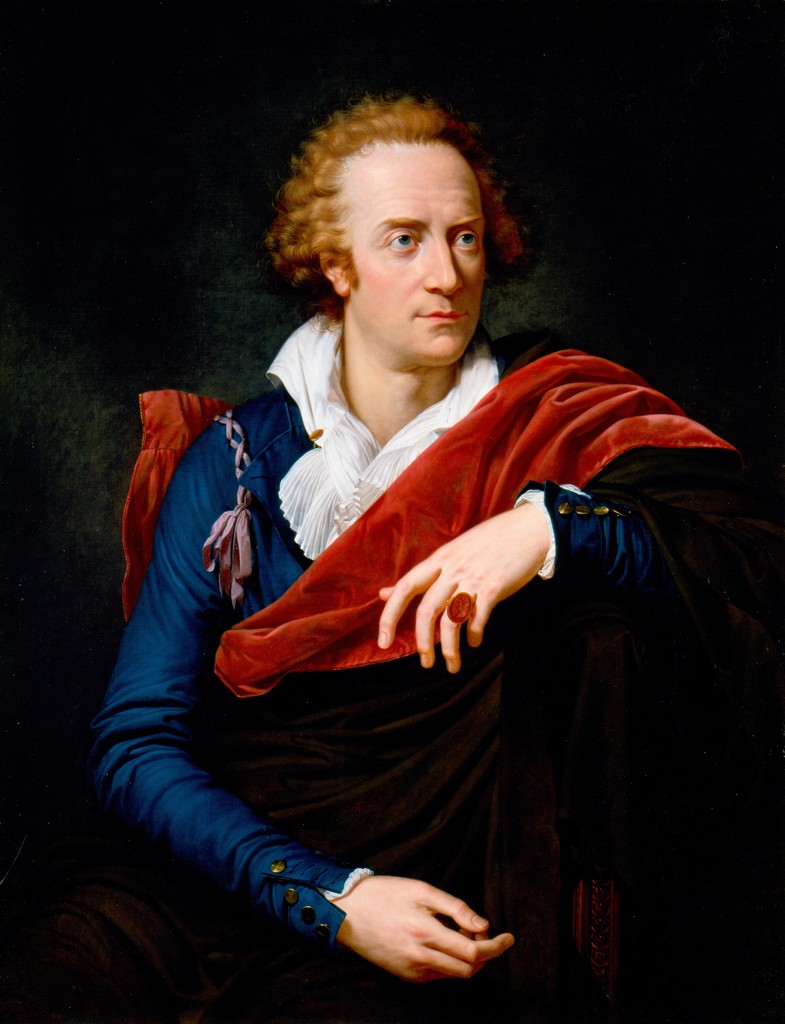
Portrait of Vittorio Alfieri by François-Xavier Fabre

Patriotism and classicism were the two principles that inspired the literature that began with Vittorio Alfieri. He worshipped the Greek and Roman idea of popular liberty in arms against tyranny. He took the subjects of his tragedies from the history of these nations and made his ancient characters talk like revolutionists of his time. The Arcadian school, with its verbosity and triviality, was rejected. His aim was to be brief, concise, strong and bitter, to aim at the sublime as opposed to the lowly and pastoral. He saved literature from Arcadian vacuities, leading it towards a national end, and armed himself with patriotism and classicism. It is to his dramas that Alfieri is chiefly indebted for the high reputation he has attained. The appearance of the tragedies of Alfieri was perhaps the most important literary event that occurred in Italy during the 18th century.

Vincenzo Monti was a patriot too, and wrote the Pellegrino apostolico, the Bassvilliana and the Feroniade; Napoleon's victories caused him to write the Prometeo and the Musagonia; in his Fanatismo and his Superstizione he attacked the papacy; afterwards he sang the praises of the Austrians. Knowing little Greek, he succeeded in translating the Iliad in a way remarkable for its Homeric feeling, and in his Bassvilliana he is on a level with Dante. In him classical poetry seemed to revive in all its florid grandeur.

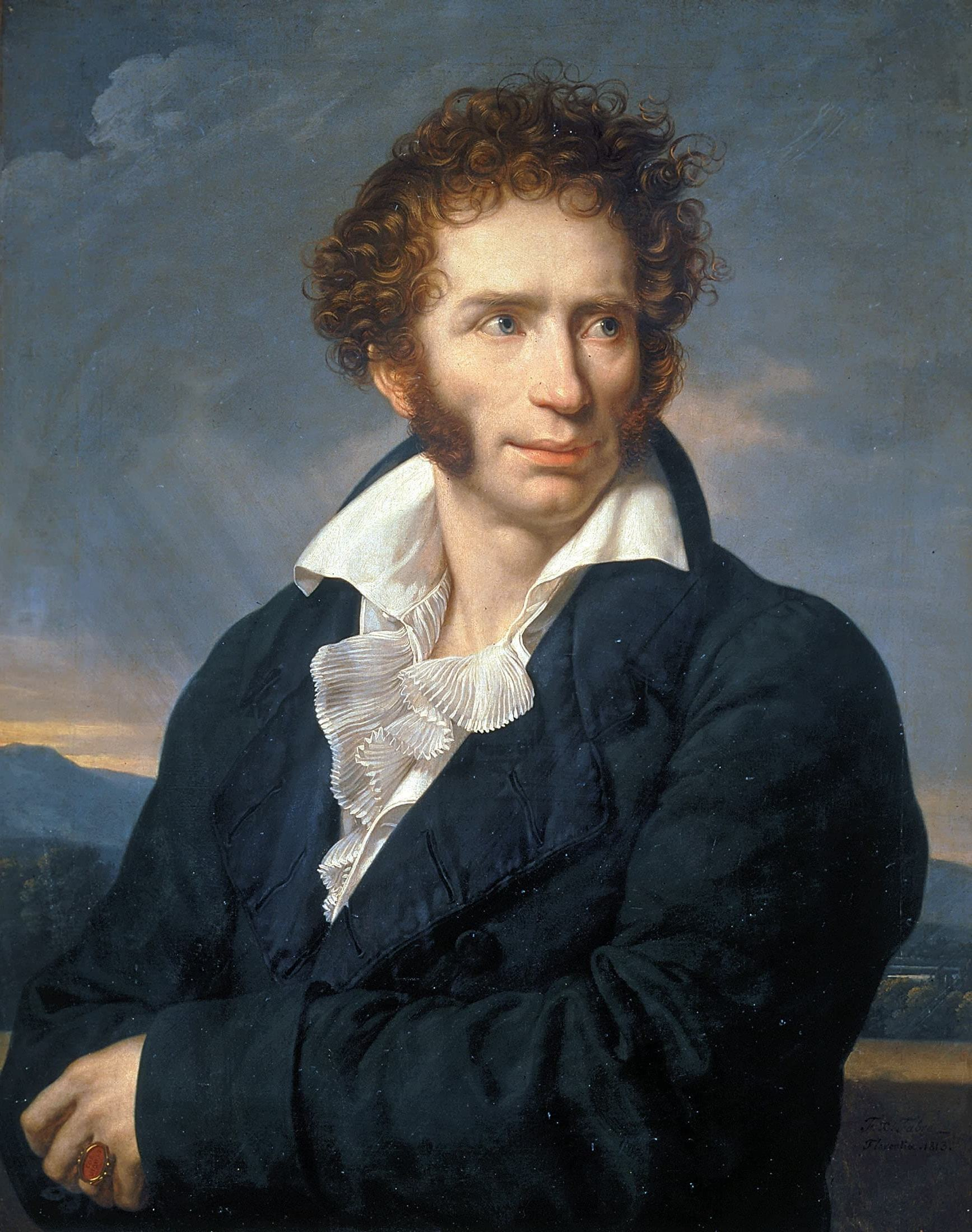
Portrait of Ugo Foscolo by François-Xavier Fabre

Ugo Foscolo was an eager patriot, inspired by classical models. The Lettere di Jacopo Ortis, inspired by Goethe's The Sorrows of Young Werther, are a love story with a mixture of patriotism; they contain a violent protest against the Treaty of Campo Formio, and an outburst from Foscolo's own heart about an unhappy love-affair of his. His passions were sudden and violent. To one of these passions Ortis owed its origin, and it is perhaps the best and most sincere of all his writings. The Sepolcri, which is his best poem, was prompted by high feeling, and the mastery of versification shows wonderful art. Among his prose works a high place belongs to his translation of the Sentimental Journey of Laurence Sterne, a writer by whom Foscolo was deeply affected. He wrote for English readers some Essays on Petrarch and on the texts of the Decamerone and of Dante, which are remarkable for when they were written, and which may have initiated a new type of literary criticism in Italy. The men who made the revolution of 1848 were brought up in his work.

==== France ====
The time of enlightenment and advancement meant that both sacred and secular authors were pushing women to be at a higher level of literary knowledgeability. France was attempting to improve the education of young women and therefore have this be seen as a reflection of the advancement of society. This led to the emergence of a new genre of literature in 18th-century France of books of conduct for girls and unmarried women. Pieces by authors including Marie-Antoinette Lenoir, Louise d'Épinay and Anne-Thérèse de Lambert all shared the same role of shaping young French women to lead successful and progressive lives. However, this form of education for women during the 18th century has been observed to be more oppressive than empowering.

==== Spain ====
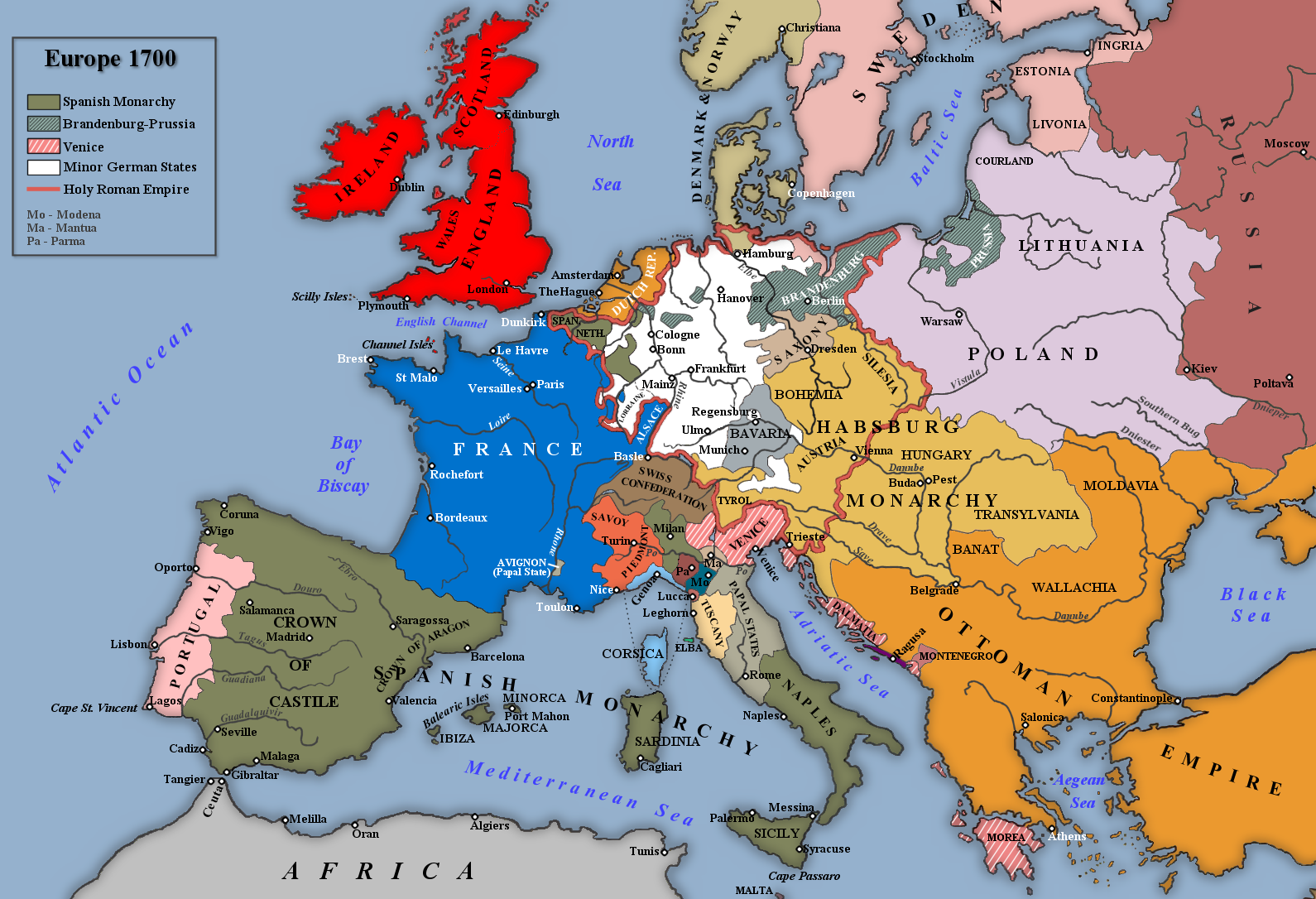
Europe from 1700 to 1714, during the time of the Spanish Succession and the Enlightenment era

The War of Spanish Succession (1701–1714) led to the French control over Spain. This influenced their cultural identity and, therefore, the Enlightenment period held an impact on Spanish literature in the 18th century. The court of Madrid during the 18th century saw an increase in influence from the French and the Italian, with literary influences derived increasingly from authors during the English Enlightenment period. English authors who are stated to hold influence on Spanish "Ilustrados" include John Locke, Edmund Burke, Edward Young and Thomas Hobbes. New takes on literature began to emerge during this time, led by poets including Ignacio de Luzán Claramunt and Gaspar Melchor de Jovellanos, who contributed greatly to the neoclassical movement of the 18th century through drama and poetic forms of literature. Only until the 20th century, however, was the Spanish Enlightenment period properly acknowledged by scholars, with past research regarding the Spanish Enlightenment period as a "time of foreign imitation".

The Spanish Enlightenment held impact on women in Spain, with more women publishing literature, becoming members as well as subscribers to publications including the Semanario de Salamanca and the Diario de Madrid. Numerous women who contributed to the Spanish Enlightenment period include poet Margarita Hickey, author Frasquita Larrea, and poet María Gertrudis Hore.

==== Russia ====
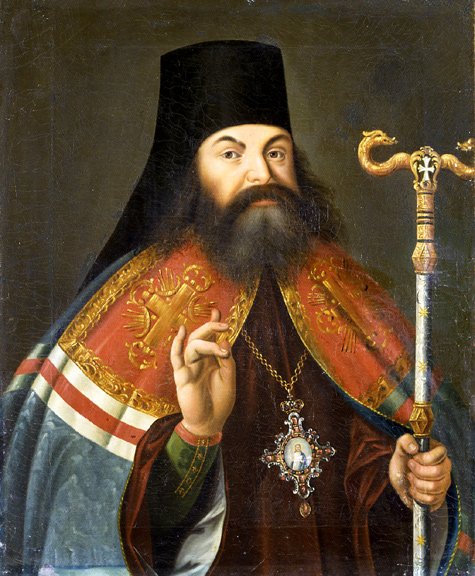
Portrait of Feofan Prokopovich

During the 18th century, Russia was experiencing expansions in military and geographical control, a key facet of the Enlightenment period. This is reflected in the literature of the time period. Satire and the panegyric had influenced the development of Russian literature as seen in the Russian literary figures of the time including Feofan Prokopovich, Kantemir, Derzhavin and Karamzin.

=== Sublime era ===
==== Spain ====
Spanish literature of the 18th century, apart from being influenced by the Enlightenment period, was influenced by the literary concept of the "sublime". The "sublime" was the linkage between Spanish Neoclassical poetry and Romantic poetry prevalent during the 18th century, and was a concept of literary, rhetorical and philosophical value. Longinus described the literary devices that the sublime creates as those that allowed the reader to experience something similar to the speaker. He had created a style of language that was not used to persuade, but merely to transport the reader into the mind of the speaker.

== 19th century ==
=== Romantic era ===
==== Italy ====
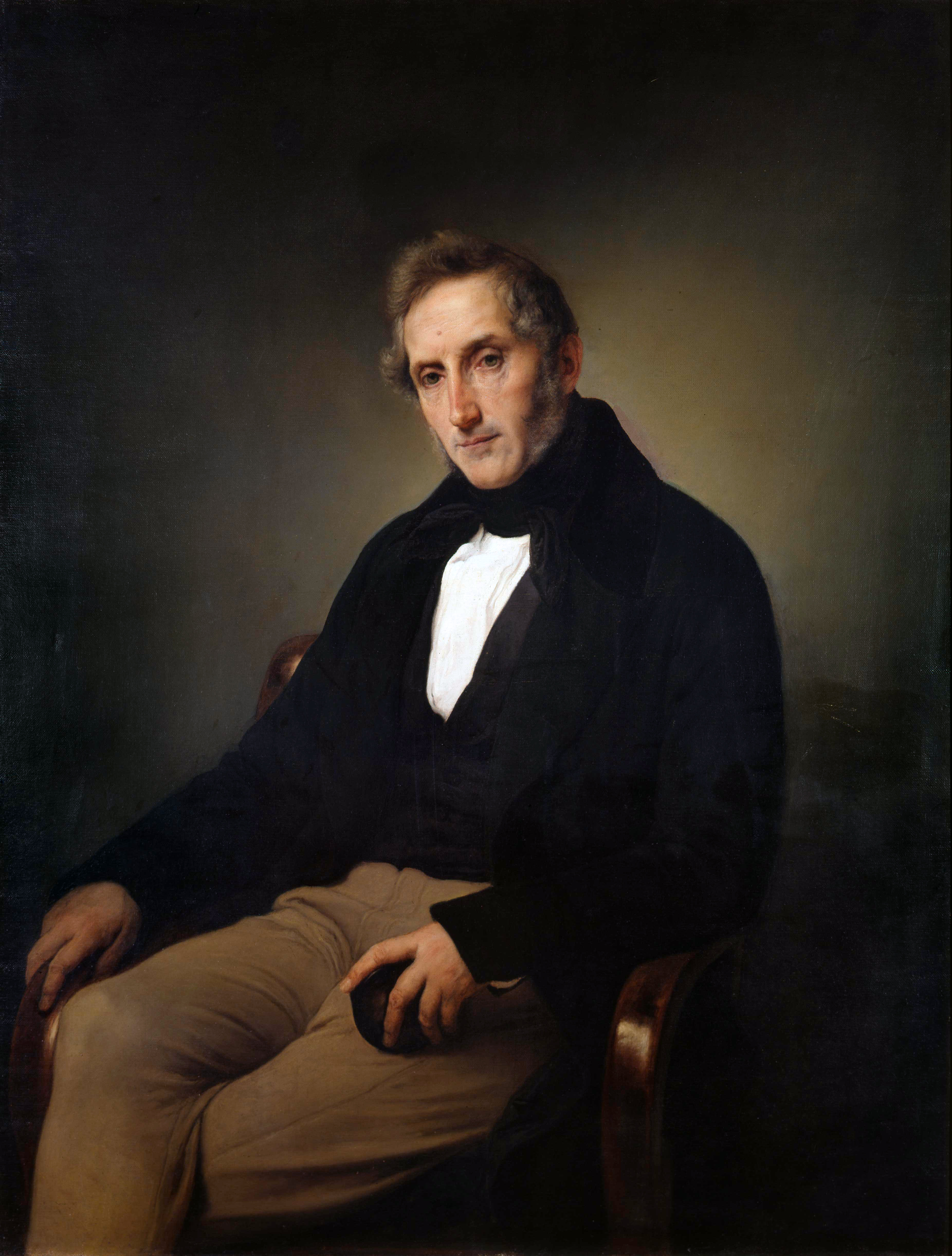
Portrait of Alessandro Manzoni by Francesco Hayez

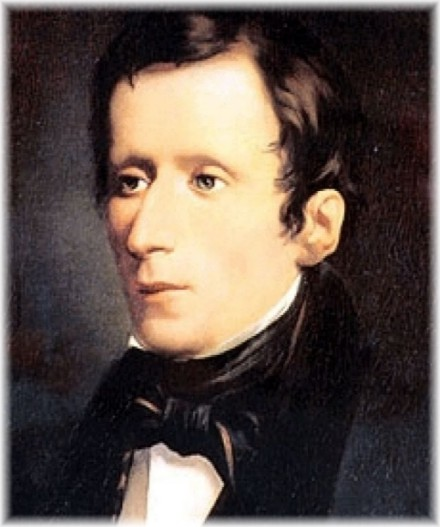
Portrait of Giacomo Leopardi by Domenico Morelli

The Romantic era for literature was at its pinnacle during the 19th century and was a period which influenced western literature. The romantic school had as its organ the Conciliatore established in 1818 at Milan, on the staff of which were Silvio Pellico, Ludovico di Breme, Giovile Scalvini, Tommaso Grossi, Giovanni Berchet, Samuele Biava, and Alessandro Manzoni. All were influenced by the ideas that, especially in Germany, constituted the movement called Romanticism. In Italy the course of literary reform took another direction. Italian writers of the 19th century, including the likes of Leopardi and Alessandro Manzoni, detested being grouped into a "category" of writing. Therefore, Italy was home to many isolated literary figures, with no unambiguous meaning for the term "Romanticism" itself. This was explained in the writings of Pietro Borsieri, in which he depicted the term Romanticism as being a literary movement that was self-defined by the writers. Contrastingly, it was noted by writers of the time, including Giuseppe Acerbi, how Italian Romantics were merely mimicking the trends seen in foreign nations in a hasty way which lacked the depth of foreign writers. Authors including Ludovico di Breme, Ermes Visconti and Giovanni Berchet did classify themselves as Romantics, however they were critiqued by others, including Gina Martegiani, who wrote in her essay "Il Romanticismo Italiano Non Esiste" of 1908 that the authors who considered themselves Romantics only created two-dimensional imitations of the works of German Romantic authors.

The poetry of the Romantic era of Italy was focused greatly on the motif of nature. Romantic poets drew inspiration from ancient Greek and Latin poetry and mythology, while poets of this time period also sought to create a sense of unity within the country with their writings. Political disunity was prevalent in 19th-century Italy, reflected in the Risorgimento. After the Neapolitan Revolution of 1799, the term "Risorgimento" was used in the context of a movement of "national redemption" as stated by Antonio Gramsci. The one facet which held Italy together during this time of political disunity was the poetry and writings of the time period, as suggested by Berchet. The desire for freedom and the sense of "national redemption" is reflected heavily in the works of Italian Romantics, including Ugo Foscolo, who wrote the story The Last Letters of Jacopo Ortis, in which a man was forced to commit suicide due to the political persecutions of his country.

Another notable poet and prose writer of that time for Italian literature was Giacomo Leopardi. He is widely seen as one of the most radical and challenging thinkers of the 19th century but routinely compared by Italian critics to his older contemporary Alessandro Manzoni despite expressing "diametrically opposite positions". The strongly lyrical quality of his poetry made him a central figure on the European and international literary and cultural landscape.

==== Britain ====
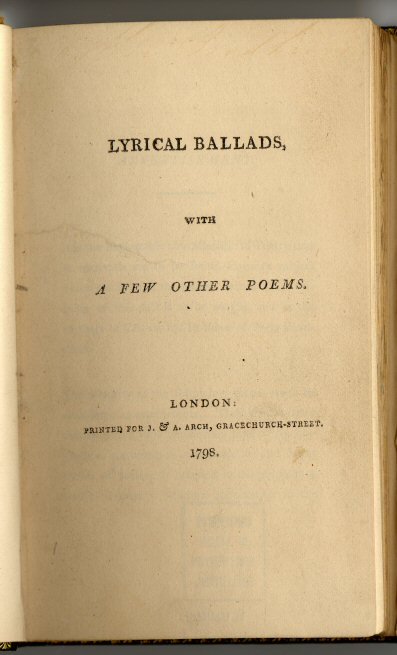
Lyrical Ballads, with a few other poems, by William Wordsworth and Samuel Taylor Coleridge

Historical events including the European Revolution, within which the French revolution is claimed to be most significant, contributed to the development of 19th-century British Romanticism. These revolutions birthed a new genre of authors and poets who used their literature to convey their distaste for authority. This is seen in the works of poet and artist William Blake, who used primarily philosophical and biblical themes in his poetry, and Samuel Taylor Coleridge and William Wordsworth, also known as the "Lake Poets", whose literature including the Lyrical Ballads is claimed to have "marked the beginning of the Romantic Movement".

There was known to be two waves of British Romantic authors; Coleridge and Wordsworth were grouped into the first wave, while a more radical and "aggressive" second wave of authors included the likes of George Gordon Byron and Percy Bysshe Shelley. Due to the adamant aggression of Byron in his poetic works which advocated for an anti-violence revolution and world in which equality existed, a form of fictional character was born named the "Byronic hero", who is known to be rebellious in character. The Byronic hero "pervades much of his work" and Byron is considered a reflection of the character he created.

Greek and Roman mythology was prevalent in the works of British Romantic poets including Byron, Keats and Shelley. However, there were poets who rejected the notion of mythological inspiration, including Coleridge, who preferred to take inspiration from the Bible to produce significantly religious-inspired works.

British 19th-century Romanticism developed literature which focused on the "self-organisation of living beings, their growth and adaption into their environments and the creative spark that inspired the physical system to perform complex functions". There are observed close ties between medicine, a concept which was experiencing innovation during the 19th century, and Romantic English literature. British Romanticism also had influences from 13th-/16th-century Italian art as a consequence of British artists who resided in Italy during the time of Bonaparte's invasion dealing paintings to London clients from medieval to the High Renaissance Italian periods. The exposure to these artworks influenced British literature and culture during a time "when Britain was struggling to prove the value of its own visual culture". The art gave inspiration and "shaped the aesthetic" of Romantic literature for writers including the likes of author Mary Shelley. The diversity and lack of standard seen in the work of infamous Italian artists including Michelangelo and Raphael allowed Romantic writers to celebrate new forms and ways of expression. English essayist William Hazlitt articulated how the lack of restriction, and ample artistic liberty and freedom seen through the artworks of Raphael inspired poets of the Romantic era. Michelangelo's artworks, which "embodied the sublime", were reflected in the literature of Dante and Shakespeare, with constant analogies being made at the time comparing the two.

== Between the 19th and 20th century ==
=== Italy ===
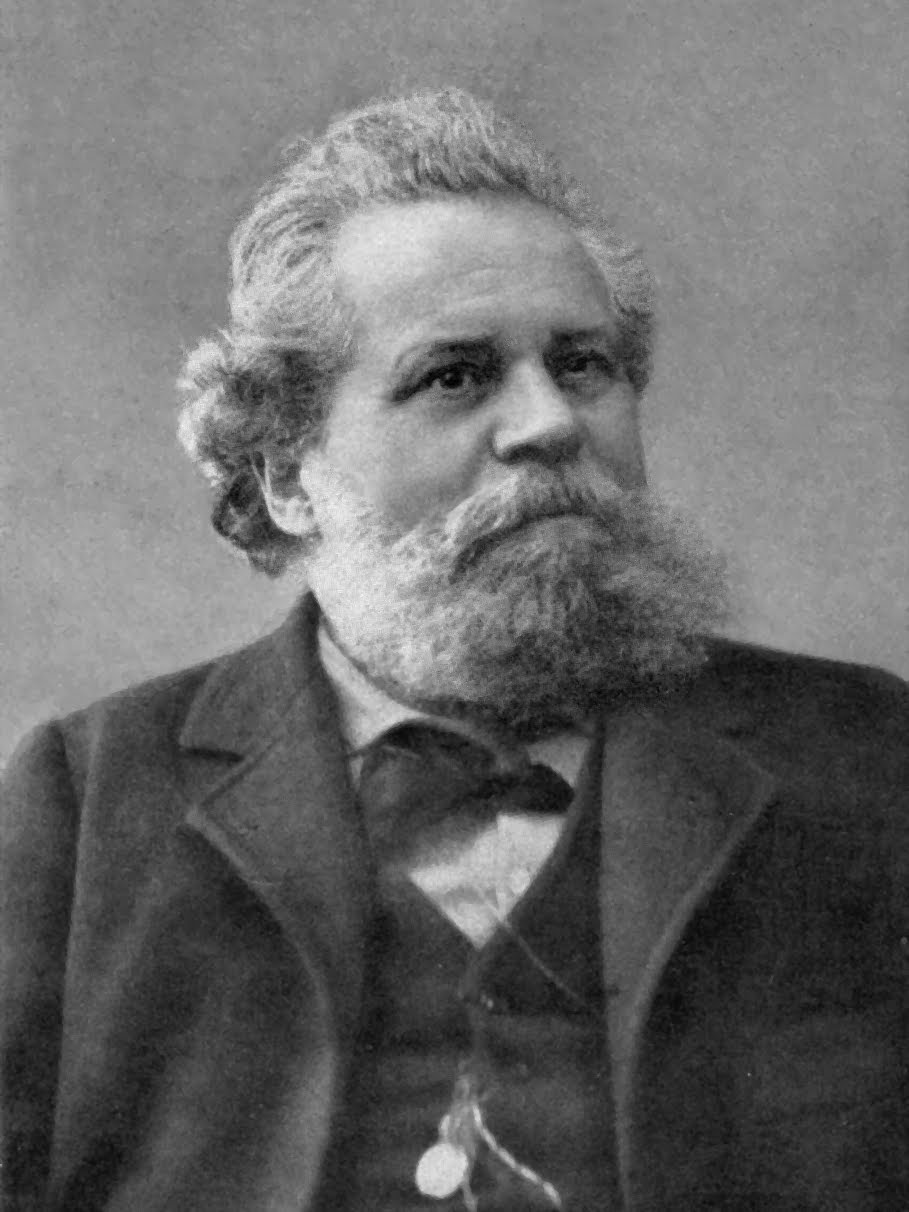
Giosuè Carducci

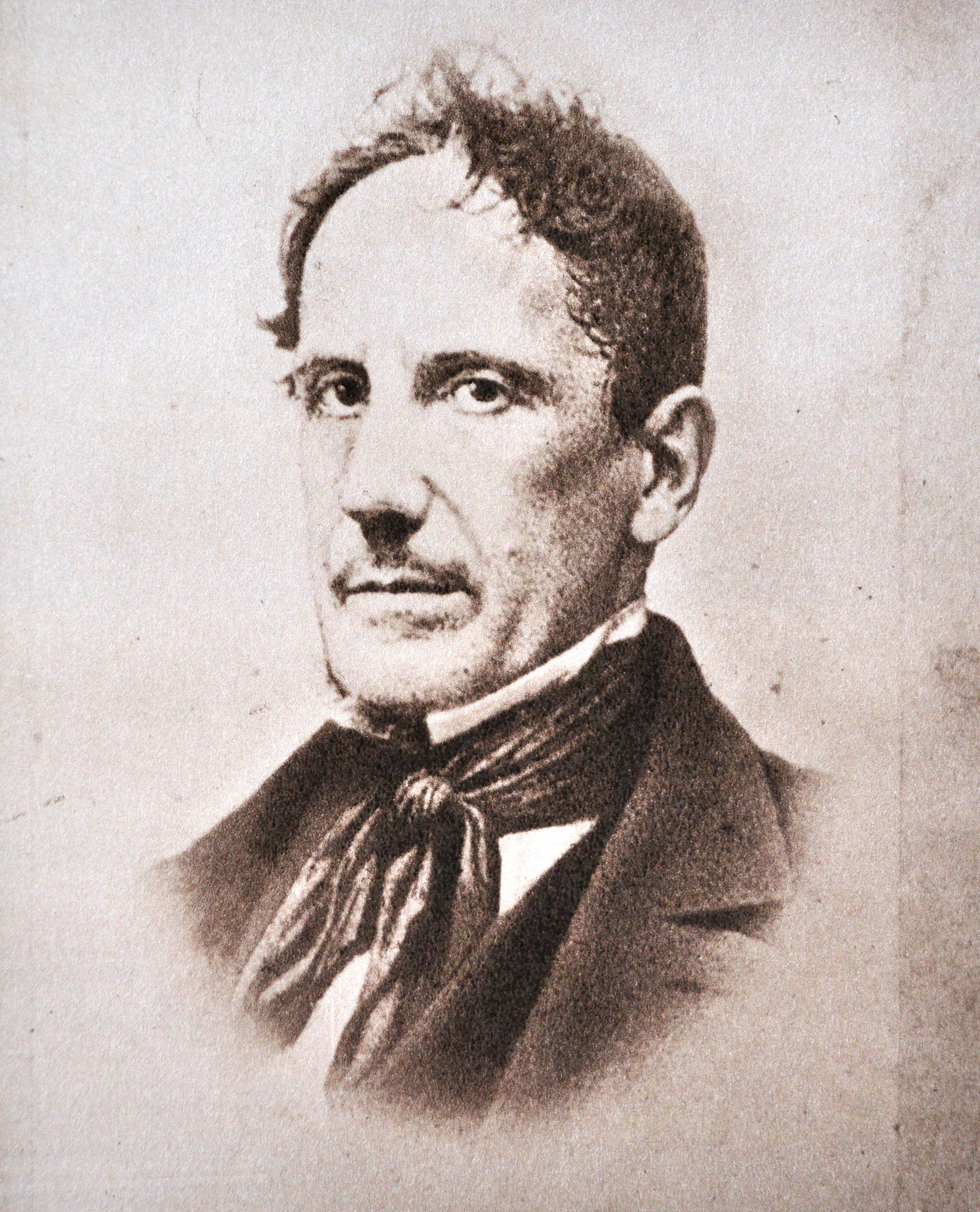
Giuseppe Gioacchino Belli

After the Risorgimento, political literature became less important. The first part of this period is characterized by two divergent trends of literature that both opposed Romanticism. The first trend is the Scapigliatura, that attempted to rejuvenate Italian culture through foreign influences, notably from the poetry of Charles Baudelaire and the works of American writer Edgar Allan Poe. The second trend is represented by Giosuè Carducci, a dominant figure of this period, fiery opponent of the Romantics and restorer of the ancient metres and spirit who, great as a poet, was scarcely less distinguished as a literary critic and historian.

The influence of Émile Zola is evident in the Verismo. Luigi Capuana but most notably Giovanni Verga and were its main exponents and the authors of a verismo manifesto. Capuana published the novel Giacinta, generally regarded as the "manifesto" of Italian verismo. Unlike French naturalism, which was based on positivistic ideals, Verga and Capuana rejected claims of the scientific nature and social usefulness of the movement.

Instead Decadentism was based mainly on the Decadent style of some artists and authors of France and England about the end of the 19th century. The main authors of the Italian version were Antonio Fogazzaro, Giovanni Pascoli, best known for his Myricae and Poemetti, and Gabriele D'Annunzio. Although differing stylistically, they championed idiosyncrasy and irrationality against scientific rationalism. Gabriele d'Annunzio produced original work in poetry, drama and fiction, of extraordinary originality. He began with some lyrics distinguished no less by their exquisite beauty of form than by their licence, and these characteristics reappeared in a long series of poems, plays and novels.

Edmondo de Amicis is better known for his moral works and travels than for his fiction. Of the women novelists, Matilde Serao and Grazia Deledda became popular. Deledda was awarded the 1926 Nobel Prize in Literature for her works.

Giovanni Prati and Aleardo Aleardi continued romantic traditions. Other classical poets are Giuseppe Chiarini, Arturo Graf, Guido Mazzoni and Giovanni Marradi, of whom the two last named may perhaps be regarded as special disciples of Carducci. Enrico Panzacchi was at heart still a romantic. Olindo Guerrini (who wrote under the pseudonym of Lorenzo Stecchetti) is the chief representative of verismo in poetry, and, though his early works obtained a succès de scandale, he is the author of many lyrics of intrinsic value. Alfredo Baccelli and Mario Rapisardi are epic poets of distinction. Felice Cavallotti is the author of the stirring Marcia de Leonida.

Among dialect writers, the great Roman poet Giuseppe Gioacchino Belli found numerous successors, such as Renato Fucini (Pisa) and Cesare Pascarella (Rome). Among the women poets, Ada Negri, with her socialistic Fatalità and Tempeste, achieved a great reputation; and others, such as Annie Vivanti, were highly esteemed in Italy.

Among the dramatists, Pietro Cossa in tragedy, Ferdinando Martini, and Paolo Ferrari in comedy, represent the older schools. More modern methods were adopted by Giuseppe Giacosa.

In fiction, the historical romance fell into disfavour, though Emilio De Marchi produced some good examples. The novel of intrigue was cultivated by Salvatore Farina.

== 20th century and beyond ==
=== Italy ===
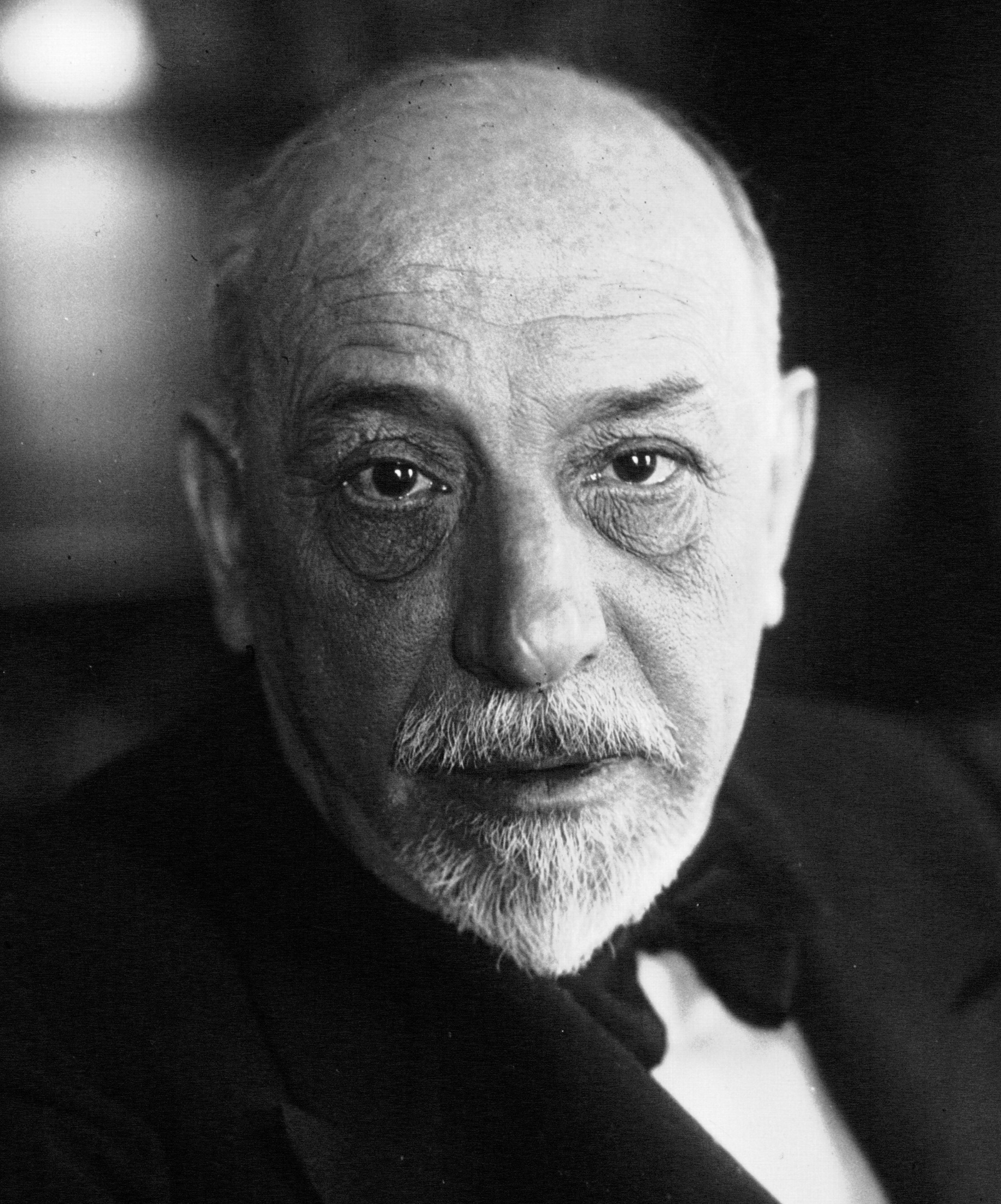
Luigi Pirandello

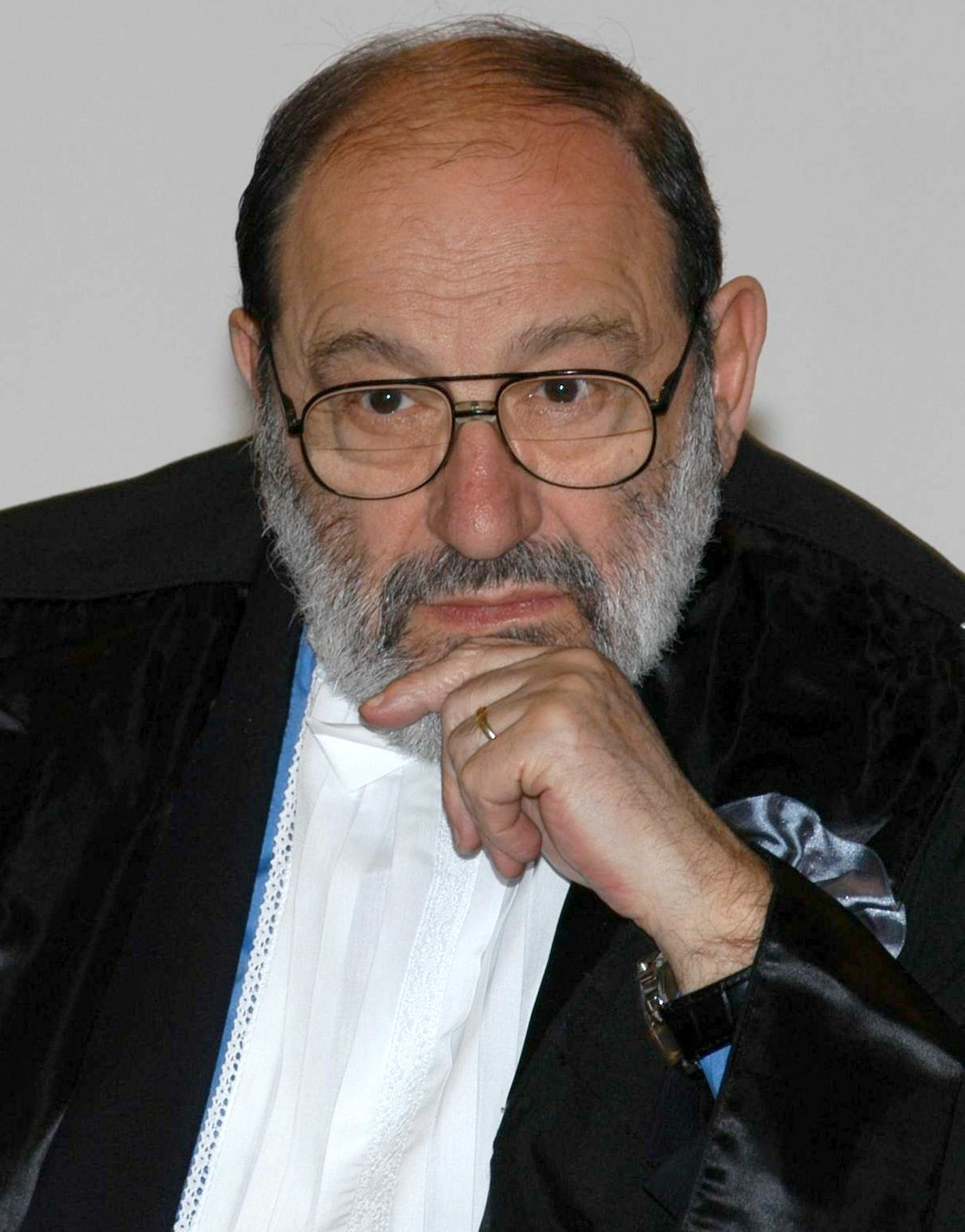
Umberto Eco

Important early-20th century writers include Italo Svevo, the author of La coscienza di Zeno (1923), and Luigi Pirandello (winner of the 1934 Nobel Prize in Literature), who explored the shifting nature of reality in his prose fiction and such plays as Sei personaggi in cerca d'autore (Six Characters in Search of an Author, 1921). Federigo Tozzi was a great novelist, critically appreciated only in recent years, and considered one of the forerunners of existentialism in the European novel.

Grazia Deledda was a Sardinian writer who focused on the life, customs, and traditions of the Sardinian people in her works. In 1926 she won the Nobel Prize for literature, becoming Italy's first and only woman recipient.

Sibilla Aleramo published her first novel, Una Donna (A Woman) in 1906. Today the novel is widely acknowledged as Italy's premier feminist novel. Her writing mixes together autobiographical and fictional elements.

Pitigrilli was the pseudonym of Dino Segre who published his most famous novel (cocaine) in 1921. Due to his portrayal of drug use and sex, the Catholic Church listed it as a "forbidden book". It has been translated into numerous languages, reprinted in new editions, and has become a classic.

Maria Messina was a Sicilian writer who focused heavily on Sicilian culture with a dominant theme being the isolation and oppression of young Sicilian women. She achieved modest recognition during her life including receiving the Medaglia D'oro Prize for "La Mérica".

Anna Bantiis most well known for her short story Il Coraggio Delle Donne (The Courage of Women) which was published in 1940. Her autobiographical work, Un Grido Lacerante, was published in 1981 and won the Antonio Feltrinelli prize. As well as being a successful author, Banti is recognized as a literary, cinematic, and art critic.

Elsa Morante began writing at an early age. One of the central themes in Morante's works is narcissism. She also uses love as a metaphor in her works, saying that love can be passion and obsession and can lead to despair and destruction. She won the Premio Viareggio award in 1948.

Alba de Céspedes was a Cuban-Italian writer from Rome. She was an anti-Fascist and was involved in the Italian Resistance. Her work was greatly influenced by the history and culture that developed around World War II. Although her books were bestsellers, Alba has been overlooked in recent studies of Italian women writers.

Poetry was represented by the Crepuscolari and the Futurists; the foremost member of the latter group was Filippo Tommaso Marinetti. Leading Modernist poets from later in the century include Salvatore Quasimodo (winner of the 1959 Nobel Prize in Literature), Giuseppe Ungaretti, Umberto Saba, who won fame for his collection of poems Il canzoniere, and Eugenio Montale (winner of the 1975 Nobel Prize in Literature). They were described by critics as "hermeticists".

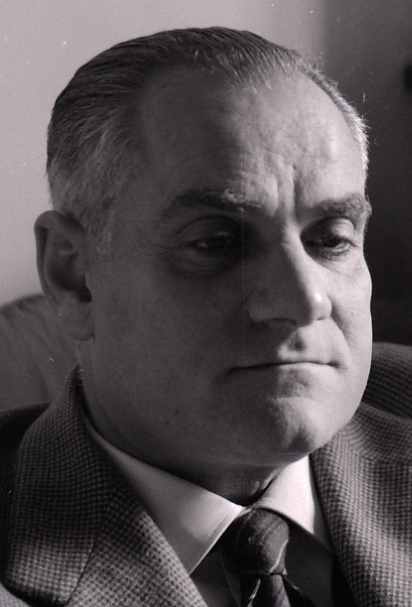
Alberto Moravia, one of the leading figures of Italian Neorealism in literature

Neorealism was a movement that developed rapidly between the 1940s and the 1950s. Although its foundations were laid in the 1920s, it flourished only after the fall of Fascism in Italy, as this type of literature was not welcomed by Fascist authorities because of its social criticism and partially because some of the "new realist" authors could hold Anti-Fascist views. For example, Alberto Moravia, one of the leading writers of the movement, had trouble with finding a publisher for his novel which brought him fame, Gli indifferenti (1929), and after he published it, he was "driven into hiding"; Carlo Bernari's Tre operai (1934, Three Workers) was unofficially banned personally by Mussolini who saw "communism" in the novel; Ignazio Silone published Fontamara (1933) in exile; Elio Vittorini was put in prison after publishing Conversazione in Sicilia (1941). The movement was profoundly affected by the translations of socially conscious U.S. and English writers during the 1930s and 1940s, namely Ernest Hemingway, William Faulkner, John Steinbeck, John Dos Passos and the others; the translators of their works, Vittorini and Cesare Pavese, would later become acclaimed novelists of the movement. After the war, the movement began rapidly developing and took the label "Neorealism"; Marxism and the experiences of the war became sources of inspiration for the postwar authors. Moravia wrote the novels The Conformist (1951) and La Ciociara (1957), while The Moon and the Bonfires (1949) became Pavese's most recognized work; Primo Levi documented his experiences in Auschwitz in If This Is a Man (1947); among the other writers were Carlo Levi, who reflected the experience of political exile in southern Italy in Christ Stopped at Eboli (1951); Curzio Malaparte, author of Kaputt (1944) and The Skin (1949), novels dealing with the war on the Eastern Front and in Naples; Pier Paolo Pasolini, also a poet and a film director, who described the life of the Roman lumpenproletariat in The Ragazzi (1955); and Corrado Alvaro.

Dino Buzzati wrote fantastic and allegorical fiction that critics have compared to Kafka and Beckett. Italo Calvino also ventured into fantasy in the trilogy I nostri antenati (Our Ancestors, 1952–1959) and post-modernism in the novel Se una notte d'inverno un viaggiatore... (If on a Winter's Night a Traveller, 1979). Carlo Emilio Gadda was the author of the experimental Quer pasticciaccio brutto de via Merulana (1957).

Giuseppe Tomasi di Lampedusa wrote only one novel, Il Gattopardo (The Leopard, 1958), but it is one of the most famous in Italian literature; it deals with the life of a Sicilian nobleman in the 19th century. Leonardo Sciascia came to public attention with his novel Il giorno della civetta (The Day of the Owl, 1961), exposing the extent of Mafia corruption in modern Sicilian society. More recently, Umberto Eco became internationally successful with the Medieval detective story Il nome della rosa (The Name of the Rose, 1980).

Dacia Maraini is one of the most successful contemporary Italian women writers. Her novels focus on the condition of women in Italy and in some works she speaks to the changes women can make for themselves and society.

Aldo Busi is also one of the most important Italian contemporary writers. His extensive production of novels, essays, travel books and manuals provides a detailed account of modern society, especially the Italian one. He is also well known as a refined translator.

== Children's literature ==
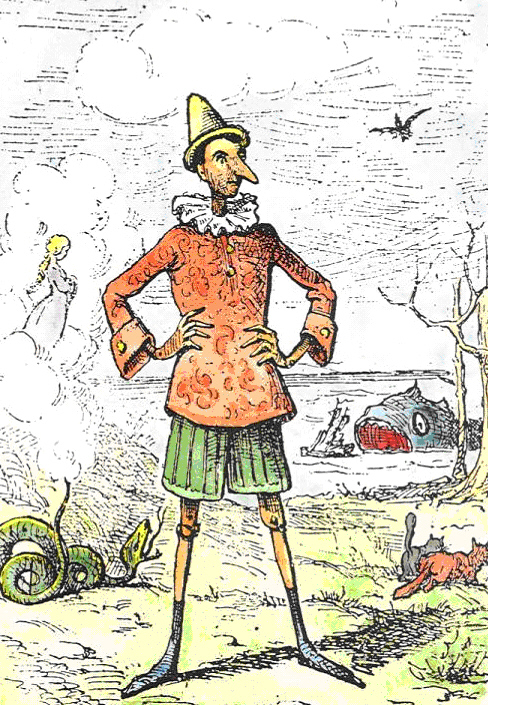
The Adventures of Pinocchio is one of the world's most translated books and a canonical piece of children's literature.

Italy has a long history of children's literature. In 1634, the Pentamerone from Italy became the first major published collection of European folk tales. The Pentamerone contained the first literary European version of the story of Cinderella. The author, Giambattista Basile, created collections of fairy tales that include the oldest recorded forms of many well-known European fairy tales. In the 1550s, Giovanni Francesco Straparola released The Facetious Nights of Straparola. Called the first European storybook to contain fairy tales, it eventually had 75 separate stories, albeit intended for an adult audience. Giulio Cesare Croce also borrowed from stories children enjoyed for his books.

In 1883, Carlo Collodi wrote The Adventures of Pinocchio, the first Italian fantasy novel. In the same year, Emilio Salgari, the man who would become "the adventure writer par excellence for the young in Italy" published for the first time his Sandokan. In the 20th century, Italian children's literature was represented by such writers as Gianni Rodari, author of Il romanzo di Cipollino, and Nicoletta Costa, creator of Julian Rabbit and Olga the Cloud.

== See also ==
- Persian literature in Western culture
- Oceanian literature
