= Guido Mazzoni =

Guido Mazzoni may refer to:

- Guido Mazzoni (sculptor) (c. 1445–1518), sculptor
- Guido Mazzoni (poet) (1859–1943), poet and professor
