= Portrait of Teresa Manzoni Stampa Borri =

Painting by Francesco Hayez

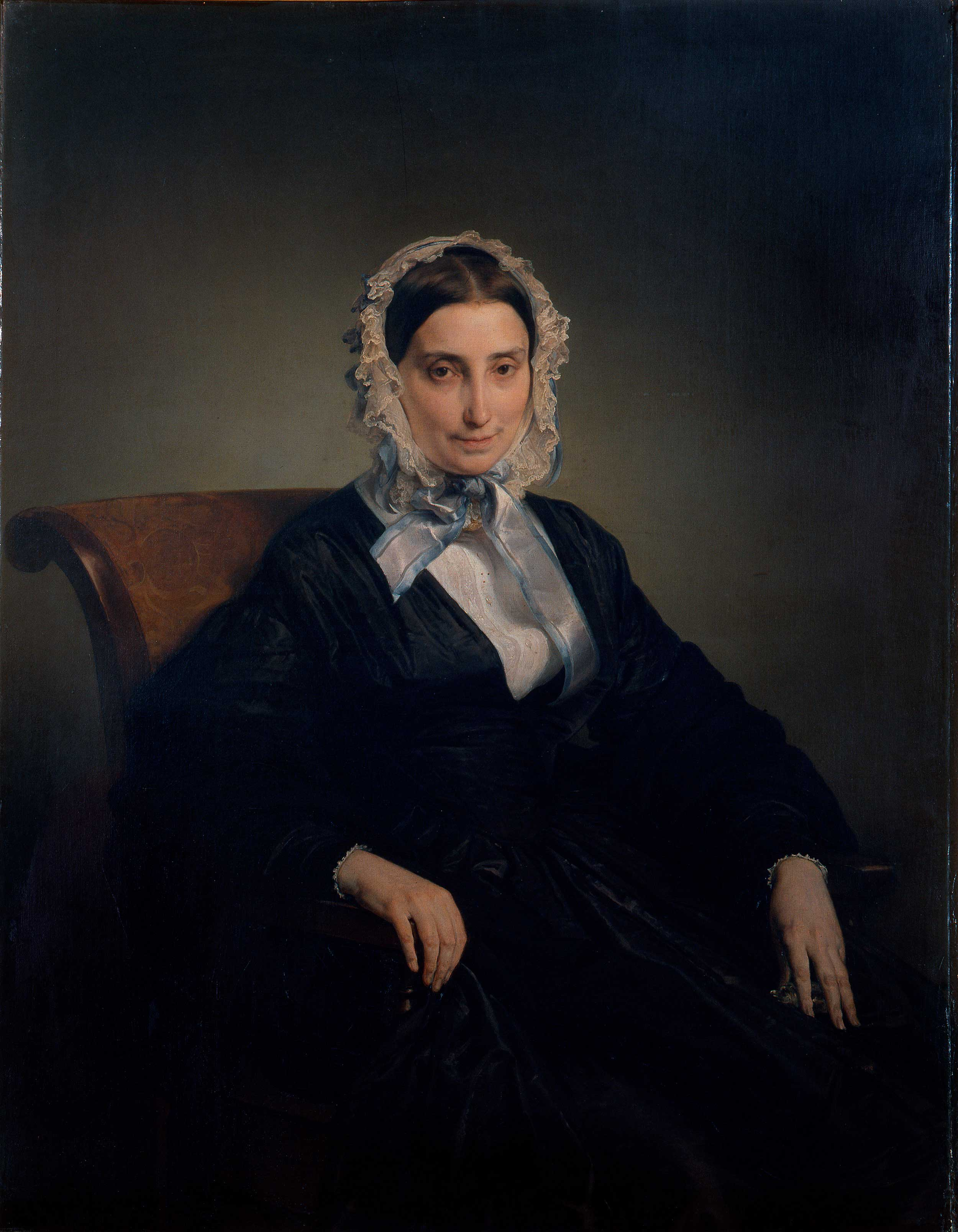
Portrait of Teresa Manzoni Stampa Borri (1849) by Francesco Hayez

Portrait of Teresa Manzoni Stampa Borri is an 1849 oil-on-canvas painting by the Italian artist Francesco Hayez, now in the Pinacoteca di Brera in Milan, to which it was given in 1900 by Stefano Stampa, the subject's son by her first marriage. She had also commissioned Portrait of Alessandro Manzoni from Hayez, showing her second husband, also in the Brera.
