= Obs de Biguli =

Italian composer

Obs de Biguli (fl. 1220) was a troubadour from Lombardy and one of the few troubadours known by name none of whose works survive. He is mentioned by name only in a poem by Guilhem Raimon:

N'Obs de Biguli se plaing
Tant es iratz e dolenz,
A Deu e pois a las genz
Del rei car chantar vol dir. . .

This was probably written in Venetia at the court of the Da Romano family on the occasion of the Emperor Frederick II (the rei [king] of the song) in 1220. Though the poem does not explicitly identify Obs as a troubadour, many subsequent scholars of the Italian troubadours have suspected that he was.

While his first name is probably an Occitan translation of the Italian Obizzo, his surname is an Occitanisation of either Bigolini, a family from Treviso that moved to Padua, or Bigoli, a family of Piacenza. Unfortunately, no Obizzo is known from the twelfth century in either family.

== Sources ==
- Bertoni, Giulio. I Trovatori d'Italia: Biografie, testi, tradizioni, note. Rome: Società Multigrafica Editrice Somu, 1967 [1915].
