= Portrait of Alessandro Manzoni =

Painting by Francesco Hayez

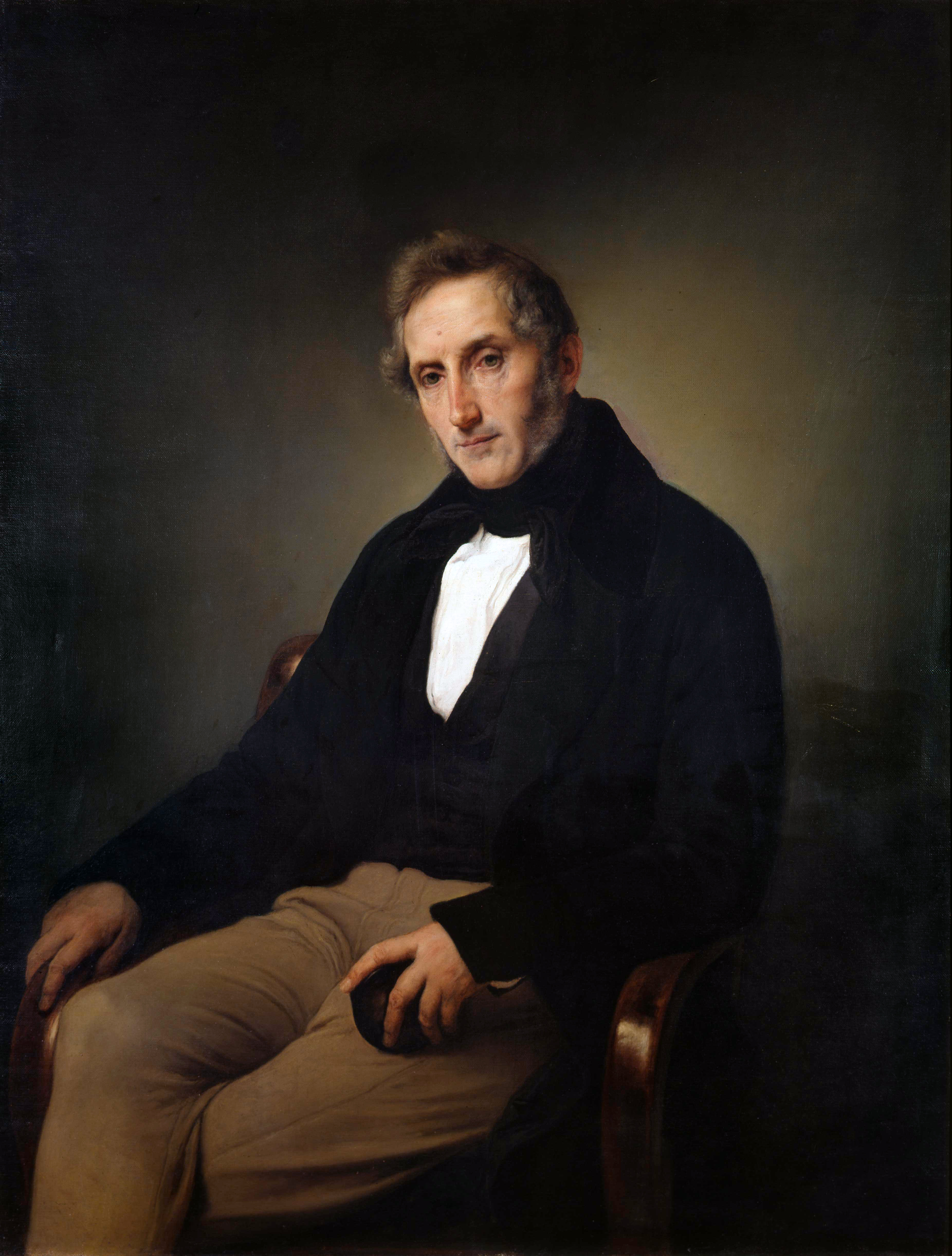
Portrait of Alessandro Manzoni (1841) by Francesco Hayez

Portrait of Alessandro Manzoni is an 1841 oil-on-canvas portrait of Alessandro Manzoni by the Italian painter Francesco Hayez, now in the Pinacoteca di Brera. It was commissioned in 1840 by Manzoni's second wife countess Teresa Borri Stampa and his son Stefano. After fifteen sittings the painter completed the work on 26 June 1841. Eight years later Teresa commissioned a portrait of herself by the same artist.
