= Guido Mazzoni (poet) =

Italian poet and literary critic (1859–1943)

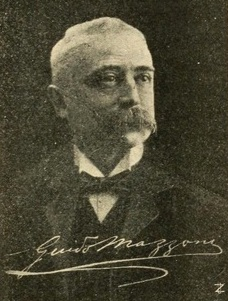
Guido Mazzoni

Guido Mazzoni (1859–1943) was an Italian poet.

He was born in Florence, Grand Duchy of Tuscany, and educated in Pisa and Bologna. In 1887 he became professor of Italian at Padua, and in 1894 at Florence, where he remained until retirement in 1934. He was much influenced by Carducci, and became prominent both as prolific and well-read critic and as a poet of individual distinction.

In 1910, he was elected a senator. In 1915, his son Carlo was taken prisoner by Austrian forces; the father volunteered for combat duty in exchange, and participated in combat along the Isonzo River.

His chief volumes of verse are Versi (1880), Nuove poesie (1886), Poesie (1891), Voci della vita (1893).
