= Scrittori d'Italia =

Lirici marinisti, published in 1910 and edited by Benedetto Croce, was the first volume of the «Scrittori d'Italia» collection.

The Scrittori d'Italia ('Authors of Italy') was an Italian book collection, published by Giuseppe Laterza & figli from 1910 to 1987 in Bari. The series was born with the intent to define and explain a cultural canon of the new Italy, disassociating from a culture yet considered too much based on the classic of the humanism, and choosing to represent also the civil history of the newborn Italian State. The original work plan included 660 volumes, of which 287 were actually published (including some second editions) for a total of 179 works.

== History of publications ==
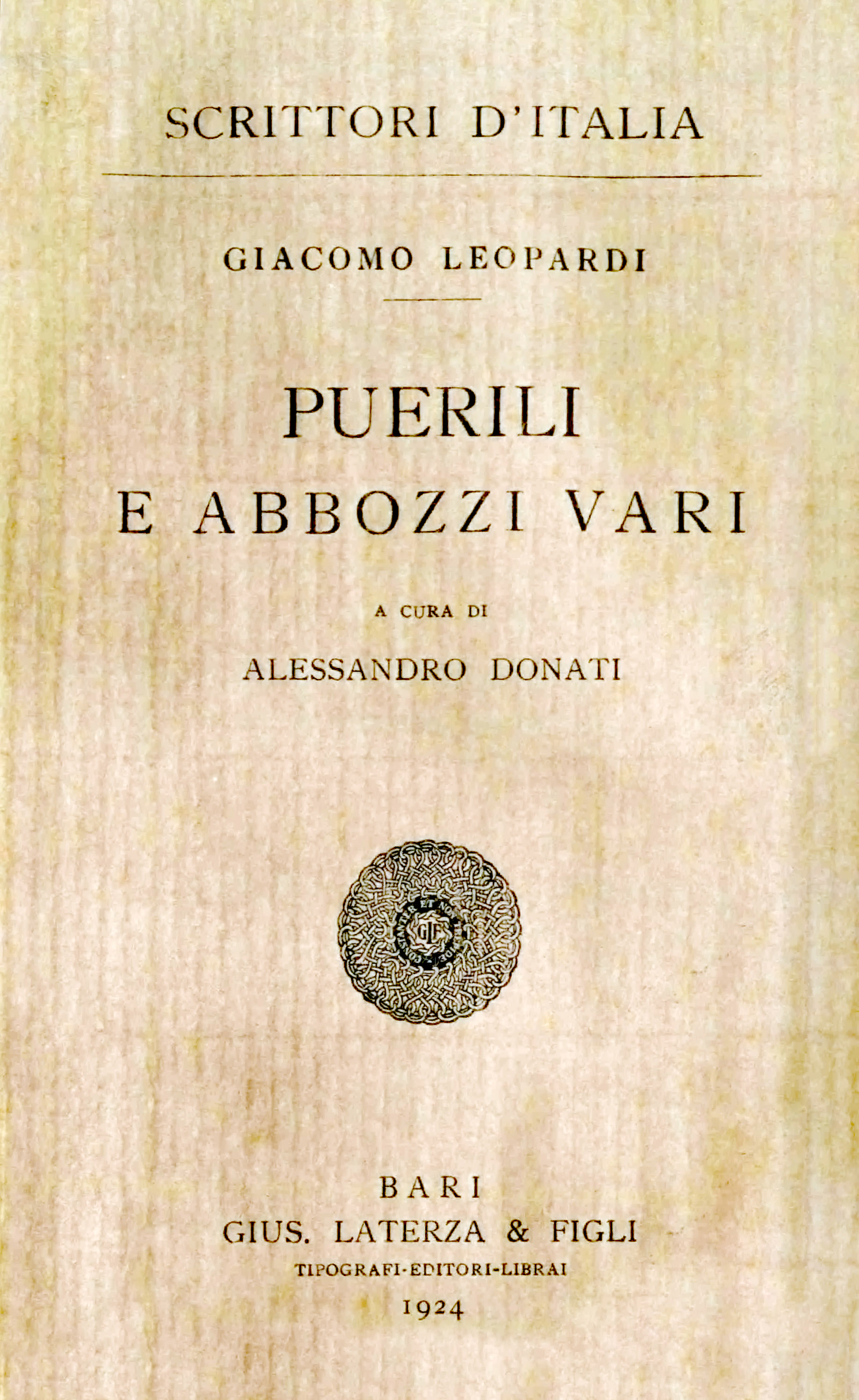
Giacomo Leopardi, Puerili e abbozzi vari, Scrittori d'Italia no.91, Laterza, 1924.

The Scrittori d'Italia book collection was born in 1910 from an idea of the not yet thirty-years-old Giovanni Laterza, who wanted to develop family cartolier activity as a "publisher of works that really serve to improve culture in general" on the model of the Barbera publishing house, magnifying the original activity of stationery and bookshop of his family, and at the same time destroying what had been the tradition of literary historiography to that day.

The bold editorial choice by Laterza was to include, with the classics, also authors of lesser importance such as, for example, historiographers, politicians, philosophers or economists, and implementing what the Piedmontese philologist and linguist Gianfranco Folena defined an "assault with the power of non-poetry and also of non-literature and anti-literature to the classical fortress and the religion of Letters". To realize this literary project, Laterza hired a fundamental personality of the Italian cultural landscape – Benedetto Croce. Croce fixed the editorial guidelines that became typical of the book series: the lack of introduction and comment, and in addendum notes, indexes and any philological apparatus.

The book collection was announced on 10 March 1910 with a telegraphic communication by Giovanni Laterza to Benedetto Croce "Starting today the composition of the Italian Authors's series, I turn my thinking to you, that wanted it to be edited by me. I promise to honor my work within your great idea". The philosopher from the Abruzzo inaugurated the series by editing the first volume dedicated to Marinist poets. Croce was followed as editor by Achille Pellizzari, Fausto Nicolini, Santino Caramella, Luigi Russo, and by Gianfranco Folena.

Croce set the collection with the aim of creating an "archive of national culture" that could be representative of the Italian cultural landscape and of the historical, philosophical and social bases that had brought Italy to unity. Only in the first four years, about fifty titles were published; the Marinist poets were followed by authors such as Matteo Bandello, Carlo Gozzi, and Teofilo Folengo.

Foresight, dedication and organizational rigor by Laterza and Croce offered to the Italian public, a few months later, editions of works such as the Military Science by Luigi Blanch and the poems of Iacopo Vittorelli. The "second phase" of the editorial development of the book collection may be considered that between 1915 and 1925. The years of the First World War slowed editorial production, that regained his vigor only in the 1920s.

The advent of the Fascist Party and the murdering of Giacomo Matteotti in 1924 marked the beginning of what may be called the "third phase" that marked the life of the Scrittori d'Italia and of his publishing house. If Croce between 1903 and 1914 had worked to fix and divulge, with the help of Giovanni Laterza, the canon of the culture of the new Italy and its texts, between 1925 and 1943 he fought to keep it and to integrate it. The firm antifascist position of Giovanni Laterza came to fruition in editorial choices far from the ostentatious "virility" and the triumphalism of the regime. In fact, in the thirties and forties were published, for example, the Dialoghi d'Amore by the Jewish author Leone Ebreo (subsequently seized on 28 December 1939), the Poems by Giuseppe Parini and the History of the Tridentine Council.

The Italian Racial Laws in 1938 and the Pact of Steel in 1939 increased the regime control on the press. The Second World War and the death of Giovanni Laterza on 21 August 1943 marked the stop of publications for the next three years, that only restarted in 1947 with Andrea da Barberino and his book Reali di Francia.

== Works published in the collection ==
Ludovico Ariosto, Orlando furioso, vol. I, Scrittori d'Italia no.108, 1928.

- 1.Benedetto Croce, ed. (1910). Lirici marinisti. Bari, G. Laterza.
- 2.Matteo Bandello (1910). Gioachino Brognoligo (ed.). Le novelle.
- 2.Matteo Bandello (1910). Gioachino Brognoligo (ed.). Le novelle (2 ed.).
- 3.Carlo Gozzi (1910). Giuseppe Prezzolini (ed.). Memorie inutili.
- 4.Giambattista Della Porta (1910). Vincenzo Spampanato (ed.). Le commedie.
- 5.Matteo Bandello (1910). Gioachino Brognoligo (ed.). Le novelle.
- 5.Matteo Bandello (1910). Gioachino Brognoligo (ed.). Le novelle (2 ed.).
- 6.Traiano Boccalini (1910). Giuseppe Rua (ed.). Ragguagli di Parnaso; Pietra del Paragone politico.
- 6.Traiano Boccalini (1910). Luigi Firpo (ed.). Ragguagli di Parnaso e scritti minori.
- 7.Luigi Blanch (1910). Amedeo Giannini (ed.). Della scienza militare. Bari, Laterza.
- 8.Carlo Gozzi (1910). Giuseppe Prezzolini (ed.). Memorie inutili.
- 9.Matteo Bandello (1910). Gioachino Brognoligo (ed.). Le novelle.
- 9.Matteo Bandello (1910). Gioachino Brognoligo (ed.). Le novelle (2 ed.).
- 10.Merlin Cocai (Teofilo Folengo) (1911). Alessandro Luzio (ed.). Le maccheronee.
- 11.Giambattista Vico (1929). Franco Nicolini (ed.). L'autobiografia, il carteggio e le poesie varie (2 ed.).
- 12.Jacopo Vittorelli (1911). Attilio Simioni (ed.). Poesie.
- 13.Giuseppe Baretti (1911). Luigi Piccioni (ed.). Prefazioni e polemiche.
- 14.Vincenzo Gioberti (1911). Fausto Nicolini (ed.). Del rinnovamento civile d'Italia.
- 15.Teofilo Folengo (1911). Umberto Renda (ed.). Opere italiane.
- 16.Vincenzo Gioberti (1911). Fausto Nicolini (ed.). Del rinnovamento civile d'Italia. Bari, Laterza.
- 17.Matteo Bandello (1911). Gioachino Brognoligo (ed.). Le novelle.
- 18.Giovanni Berchet (1911). Amedeo Giannini (ed.). Poesie.
- 19.Merlin Cocai (Teofilo Folengo) (1911). Alessandro Luzio (ed.). Le maccheronee.
- 21.Giambattista Della Porta (1911). Vincenzo Spampanato (ed.). Le commedie.
- 22.Carlo Gozzi (1911). Cornelia Ortiz (ed.). La Marfisa bizzarra.
- 23.Matteo Bandello (1912). Gioachino Brognoligo (ed.). Le novelle.
- 24.Vincenzo Gioberti (1912). Fausto Nicolini (ed.). Del rinnovamento civile d'Italia.
- 25.Ireneo Sanesi, ed. (1912). Commedie del Cinquecento.
- 26.Giuseppe Baretti (1912). Luigi Piccioni (ed.). La scelta delle lettere familiari.
- 27.Giovanni Berchet (1912). Egidio Bellorini (ed.). Scritti critici e letterari.
- 28.Teofilo Folengo (1912). Umberto Renda (ed.). Opere italiane.
- 29.Giambattista Marino (1911). Angelo Borzelli; Fausto Nicolini (eds.). Epistolario.
- 29.Giambattista Marino (1912). Angelo Borzelli; Fausto Nicolini (eds.). Epistolario.
- 30.Marco Polo (1928). Dante Olivieri (ed.). Il milione: secondo la riduzione italiana della Crusca riscontrata sul manoscritto arricchita e rettificata mediante altri manoscritti italiani (2 ed.).
- 31.Francesco De Sanctis (1912). Benedetto Croce (ed.). Storia della letteratura italiana. Vol. 1 (Nuova edizione ed.).
- 31.Francesco De Sanctis (1962). Benedetto Croce (ed.). Storia della letteratura italiana. Vol. 1 (7ª edizione nuovamente rivista da Alfredo Parente ed.).
- 32.Francesco De Sanctis (1912). Benedetto Croce (ed.). Storia della letteratura italiana. Vol. 2 (Nuova edizione ed.).
- 32.Francesco De Sanctis (1962). Benedetto Croce (ed.). Storia della letteratura italiana. Vol. 2 (7ª edizione nuovamente rivista da Alfredo Parente ed.).
- 33.Alessandro Donati, ed. (1912). Poeti minori del Settecento: Savioli, Pompei, Paradisi, Cerretti ed altri. Bari, Laterza.
- 34.Santa Caterina da Siena (1912). Matilde Fiorilli (ed.). Libro della divina dottrina, volgarmente detto Dialogo della divina provvidenza (Nuova edizione secondo un inedito codice senese ed.).
- 34.Santa Caterina da Siena (1928). Matilde Fiorilli (ed.). Libro della divina dottrina, volgarmente detto Dialogo della divina Provvidenza (2. edizione interamente riveduta da Santino Caramella ed.).
- 35.Giovanni Guidiccioni, Francesco Beccuti (1912). Ezio Chiorboli (ed.). Rime.
- 36.Relazioni degli ambasciatori veneti al Senato: Ferrara, Mantova, Monferrato. 1912.
- 37.Giuseppe Zonta, ed. (1912). Trattati d'amore del Cinquecento.
- 38.Ireneo Sanesi, ed. (1912). Commedie del Cinquecento.
- 39.Traiano Boccalini (1912). Giuseppe Rua (ed.). Ragguagli di Parnaso; Pietra del Paragone politico.
- 39.Traiano Boccalini (1948). Luigi Firpo (ed.). Ragguagli di Parnaso e scritti minori.
- 40.Girolamo Parabosco, Sebastiano Erizzo (1912). Giuseppe Gigli e Fausto Nicolini (ed.). Novellieri minori del Cinquecento.
- 41.Annibal Caro (1912). Vittorio Turri (ed.). Opere.
- 42.Ugo Foscolo (1912). Vittorio Cian (ed.). Prose.
- 43.Vincenzo Cuoco (1913). Fausto Nicolini (ed.). Saggio storico sulla rivoluzione napoletana del 1799 seguito dal Rapporto al cittadino Carnot di Francesco Lomonaco.
- 44.Pietro Metastasio (1912). Fausto Nicolini (ed.). Opere. Bari, Laterza.
- 45.Alessandro Donati, ed. (1913). Poeti minori del Settecento: Mazza, Rezzonico, Bondi, Fiorentino, Cassoli, Mascheroni. Bari, Laterza.
- 46.Pietro Metastasio (1913). Fausto Nicolini (ed.). Opere.
- 47.Augusto Graziani, ed. (1913). Economisti del Cinque e Seicento. Bari, Laterza.
- 48.Giovanni Fantoni (Labindo) (1913). Gerolamo Lazzeri (ed.). Poesie. Bari G. Laterza.
- 49.Relazioni degli ambasciatori veneti al Senato: Milano, Urbino. 1913.
- 50.Cesare Balbo (1913). Fausto Nicolini (ed.). Della storia d'Italia dalle origini fino ai nostri giorni: sommario.
- 51.Giambattista Marino (1913). Benedetto Croce (ed.). Poesie varie.
- 52.Gaspara Stampa, Veronica Franco (1913). Abdelkader Salza (ed.). Rime.
- 53.Pietro Aretino (1913). Fausto Nicolini (ed.). Il primo libro delle Lettere.
- 54.Lorenzo de' Medici (1913). Attilio Simioni (ed.). Opere.
- 55.Giuseppe Parini (1913). Egidio Bellorini (ed.). Prose. Bari, Laterza.
- 56.Giuseppe Zonta, ed. (1913). Trattati del Cinquecento sulla donna.
- 57.Ugo Foscolo (1913). Vittorio Cian (ed.). Prose.
- 58.Giuseppe Paladino, ed. (1913). Opuscoli e lettere di riformatori italiani del Cinquecento.
- 59.Lorenzo de' Medici (1914). Attilio Simioni (ed.). Opere.
- 60.Cesare Balbo (1914). Fausto Nicolini (ed.). Della storia d'Italia dalle origini fino ai nostri giorni: sommario.
- 61.Giambattista Guarini (1914). Gioachino Brognoligo (ed.). Il Pastor fido e il Compendio della poesia tragicomica.
- 62.Pietro Metastasio (1914). Fausto Nicolini (ed.). Opere.
- 63.Teofilo Folengo (1914). Umberto Renda (ed.). Opere italiane.
- 64.Ezio Levi, ed. (1914). Fiore di leggende, cantari antichi.
- 65.Federico Frezzi (1914). Enrico Filippini (ed.). Il quadriregio.
- 66.Sabadino degli Arienti (1914). Giovanni Gamn (ed.). Le porretane.
- 67.Giambattista Vico (1914). Giovanni Gentile, Fausto Nicolini (ed.). Le orazioni inaugurali, il De Italorum sapientia e le polemiche.
- 68.Pietro Metastasio (1914). Fausto Nicolini (ed.). Opere.
- 69.Iacopone da Todi (1915). Giovanni Ferri (ed.). Le Laude: secondo la stampa fiorentina del 1490.
- 69.Iacopone da Todi (1930). Giovanni Ferri (ed.). Le Laude: secondo la stampa fiorentina del 1490 (2. edizione interamente riveduta da Santino Caramella ed.).
- 70.Tommaso Campanella (1915). Giovanni Gentile (ed.). Poesie.
- 70.Tommaso Campanella (1938). Giovanni Gentile (ed.). Poesie (Nuova edizione ed.).
- 71.Giuseppe Parini (1915). Egidio Bellorini (ed.). Prose.
- 72.Guido Zaccagnini e Amos Parducci, ed. (1915). Rimatori siculo-toscani del Dugento. Serie 1., Pistoiesi, lucchesi, pisani. Bari, Laterza.
- 73.Ferdinando Galiani (1915). Fausto Nicolini (ed.). Della moneta.
- 74.Vincenzo Cuoco (1916). Fausto Nicolini (ed.). Platone in Italia.
- 75.Giovanni Prati (1916). Olindo Malagodi (ed.). Poesie varie. Bari, Laterza.
- 75; 78.Giovanni Prati (1916). Olindo Malagodi (ed.). Poesie varie. Bari, Laterza.
- 76.Pietro Aretino (1916). Fausto Nicolini (ed.). Il secondo libro delle lettere. Parte prima.
- 77.Pietro Aretino (1915). Fausto Nicolini (ed.). Il secondo libro delle lettere. Parte seconda.
- 79.Relazioni degli ambasciatori veneti al Senato. Vol. 1. 1916.
- 80.Relazioni degli ambasciatori veneti al Senato. Vol. 2. 1916.
- 81.Lorenzo Da Ponte (1918). di Giovanni Gamn e Fausto Nicolini (ed.). Memorie. Vol. 1.
- 82.Lorenzo Da Ponte (1918). di Giovanni Gamn e Fausto Nicolini (ed.). Memorie. Vol. 2.
- 83.Giacomo Leopardi (1917). Alessandro Donati (ed.). Canti.
- 83.Giacomo Leopardi (1938). Leone Ginzburg (ed.). Canti.
- 84.Giovanni Boccaccio (1918). Domenico Guerri (ed.). Il comento alla Divina Commedia e gli altri scritti intorno a Dante. Vol. 1.
- 85.Giovanni Boccaccio (1918). Domenico Guerri (ed.). Il comento alla Divina Commedia e gli altri scritti intorno a Dante. Vol. 2.
- 86.Giovanni Boccaccio (1918). Domenico Guerri (ed.). Il comento alla Divina Commedia e gli altri scritti intorno a Dante. Vol. 3.
- 87.Ugo Foscolo (1920). Vittorio Cian (ed.). Prose. Vol. 3.
- 88.Aldo Francesco Massera, ed. (1920). Sonetti burleschi e realistici dei primi due secoli. Vol. 1.
- 88–89.Luigi Russo, ed. (1940). Sonetti burleschi e realistici dei primi due secoli.
- 89.Aldo Francesco Massera, ed. (1920). Sonetti burleschi e realistici dei primi due secoli. Vol. 2.
- 90.Giacomo Leopardi (1921). Alessandro Donati (ed.). Versi; Paralipomeni della Batracomiomachia.
- 91.Giacomo Leopardi (1924). Alessandro Donati (ed.). Puerili e abbozzi vari.
- 92.Vincenzo Cuoco (1924). Fausto Nicolini (ed.). Platone in Italia. Vol. 2.
- 93.Vincenzo Cuoco (1924). Nino Cortese e Fausto Nicolini (ed.). Periodo milanese : 1801–1806.
- 94.Vincenzo Cuoco (1924). Nino Cortese e Fausto Nicolini (ed.). Periodo napoletano (1806–1815) e carteggio.
- 95.Ludovico Ariosto (1924). Giuseppe Fatini (ed.). Lirica.
- 96.Domenico Guerri (1926). Il commento del Boccaccio a Dante: limiti della sua autenticità e questioni critiche che n'emergono.
- 97.Giovanni Boccaccio (1927). Aldo Francesco Massèra (ed.). Il Decameron. Vol. 1.
- 97.Giovanni Boccaccio (1955). Charles S. Singleton (ed.). Il Decameron. Vol. 1.
- 98.Giovanni Boccaccio (1927). Aldo Francesco Massèra (ed.). Il Decameron. Vol. 2.
- 98.Giovanni Boccaccio (1955). Charles S. Singleton (ed.). Il Decameron. Vol. 2.
- 99.Giuseppe Paladino, ed. (1927). Opuscoli e lettere di riformatori italiani del Cinquecento. Vol. 2.
- 100.Giovan Francesco Straparola (1927). Giuseppe Rua (ed.). Le piacevoli notti. Libro 1.
- 101.Giovan Francesco Straparola (1927). Giuseppe Rua (ed.). Le piacevoli notti. Libro 2.
- 102.Vittorio Alfieri (1927). Alessandro Donati (ed.). Della tirannide; Del principe e delle lettere; Panegirico di Plinio a Traiano; La virtù sconosciuta.
- 103.Tommaso Campanella (1927). Vincenzo Spampanato (ed.). Lettere.
- 104.Scipione Maffei (1928). Antonio Avena (ed.). Opere drammatiche e poesie varie.
- 105.Giacomo Leopardi (1928). Alessandro Donati (ed.). Operette morali.
- 106.Anton Francesco Doni (1928). Ezio Chiorboli (ed.). I marmi. Vol. 1.
- 107.Anton Francesco Doni (1928). Ezio Chiorboli (ed.). I marmi. Vol. 2.
- 108.Ludovico Ariosto (1928). Santorre Debenedetti (ed.). Orlando Furioso. Vol. 1.
- 109.Ludovico Ariosto (1928). Santorre Debenedetti (ed.). Orlando Furioso. Vol. 2.
- 110.Ludovico Ariosto (1928). Santorre Debenedetti (ed.). Orlando Furioso. Vol. 3.
- 111.Giovanni Boccaccio (1928). Aldo Francesco Massera (ed.). Opere latine minori.
- 112.Giambattista Vico (1942). Franco Nicolini (ed.). Libri 1°-2°.
- 113.Giambattista Vico (1942). Franco Nicolini (ed.). Libri 3°-5° e appendice.
- 114.Leone Ebreo (Giuda Abarbanel) (1929). Santino Caramella (ed.). Dialoghi d'amore.
- 115.Pandolfo Collenuccio (1929). Alfredo Saviotti (ed.). Compendio de le istorie del Regno di Napoli.
- 116.Pandolfo Collenuccio (1929). Alfredo Saviotti (ed.). Operette morali; Poesie latine e volgari.
- 117.Apostolo Zeno (1929). Max Fehr (ed.). Drammi scelti.
- 118.Giuseppe Parini (1929). Egidio Bellorini (ed.). Poesie. Vol. 1, Poesie di Ripano Eupilino, Il giorno e Le odi.
- 119.Giuseppe Parini (1929). Egidio Bellorini (ed.). Poesie. Vol. 2, Opere drammatiche, sonetti e poesie varie.
- 120.Francesco Guicciardini (1929). Costantino Panigada (ed.). Libri 1°-4°.
- 121.Francesco Guicciardini (1929). Costantino Panigada (ed.). Libri 5°-8°.
- 122.Francesco Guicciardini (1929). Costantino Panigada (ed.). Libri 9°-12°.
- 123.Francesco Guicciardini (1929). Costantino Panigada (ed.). Libri 13°-16°.
- 124.Francesco Guicciardini (1929). Costantino Panigada (ed.). Libri 17°-20°.
- 125.Alessandro Tassoni (1930). Giorgio Rossi (ed.). La secchia rapita; L'oceano e Le rime.
- 126.Francesco Petrarca (1930). Ezio Chiorboli (ed.). Le Rime sparse e i Trionfi.
- 127.Saverio Bettinelli (1930). Vittorio Enzo Alfieri (ed.). Lettere virgiliane e inglesi e altri scritti critici.
- 128.Benedetto Croce e Santino Caramella, ed. (1930). Politici e moralisti del Seicento: Strada, Zuccolo, Settala, Accetto, Brignole Sale, Malvezzi.
- 129.Alessandro Tassoni (1930). Giorgio Rossi (ed.). Prose politiche e morali.
- 130.Torquato Tasso (1930). Luigi Bonfigli (ed.). Gerusalemme liberata.
- 131.Luigi Pulci (1930). George B. Weston (ed.). Il Morgante. Vol. 1.
- 132.Luigi Pulci (1930). George B. Weston (ed.). Il Morgante. Vol. 2.
- 133.Paolo Giovio (1931). Costantino Panigada (ed.). Le vite del Gran Capitano e del Marchese di Pescara. Translated by Lodovico Domenichi.
- 134.Francesco Guicciardini (1931). di Roberto Palmarocchi (ed.). Storie fiorentine dal 1378 al 1509.
- 135.Giambattista Vico (1931). Fausto Nicolini (ed.). La scienza nuova prima; con la polemica Contro gli atti degli eruditi di Lipsia.
- 136.Paolo Sarpi (1931). Manlio Duilio Busnelli (ed.). Lettere a Jerome Groslot de l'Isle.
- 137.Paolo Sarpi (1931). di Manlio Duilio Busnelli (ed.). Lettere a Francesco Castrino, Christoph e Achatius von Dohna, Philippe Duplessis-Mornay, Isaac Casaubon, Daniel Heinsius.
- 138.Giuseppe Baretti (1932). Luigi Piccioni (ed.). La frusta letteraria. Vol. 1.
- 139.Giuseppe Baretti (1936). Luigi Piccioni (ed.). La frusta letteraria. Vol. 2.
- 140.Francesco Guicciardini (1932). Roberto Palmarocchi (ed.). Dialogo e discorsi del reggimento di Firenze.
- 141.Giacomo Leopardi (1932). Alessandro Donati (ed.). Pensieri; Moralisti greci; Volgarizzamenti e scritti vari.
- 142.Carlo Troya (1932). Costantino Panigada (ed.). Del veltro allegorico di Dante e altri saggi storici.
- 143.Dante Alighieri (1933). Domenico Guerri (ed.). La Divina Commedia.
- 144.Alessandro Manzoni (1933). Santino Caramella (ed.). I promessi sposi.
- 145.Francesco Guicciardini (1933). Roberto Palmarocchi (ed.). Scritti politici e Ricordi.
- 146.Luigi Settembrini (1934). Adolfo Omodeo (ed.). Ricordanze della mia vita. Vol. 1.
- 147.Luigi Settembrini (1934). Adolfo Omodeo (ed.). Ricordanze della mia vita. Vol. 2.
- 148.Torquato Tasso (1934). Luigi Bonfigli (ed.). Gerusalemme conquistata. Vol. 1.
- 149.Torquato Tasso (1934). Luigi Bonfigli (ed.). Gerusalemme conquistata. Vol. 2.
- 150.Guido Bentivoglio (1934). Costantino Panigada (ed.). Memorie e lettere.
- 151.Fra Paolo Sarpi (1935). Giovanni Gamn (ed.). Istoria del Concilio tridentino. Vol. 1.
- 152.Fra Paolo Sarpi (1935). Giovanni Gamn (ed.). Istoria del Concilio tridentino. Vol. 2.
- 153.Fra Paolo Sarpi (1935). Giovanni Gamn (ed.). Istoria del Concilio tridentino. Vol. 3.
- 154.Giuseppe Baretti (1936). Luigi Piccioni (ed.). Epistolario. Vol. 1.
- 155.Giuseppe Baretti (1936). Luigi Piccioni (ed.). Epistolario. Vol. 2.
- 156.Francesco Guicciardini (1936). Roberto Palmarocchi (ed.). Scritti autobiografici e rari.
- 157.Franco Sacchetti (1936). Alberto Chiari (ed.). Il libro delle rime.
- 158.Torquato Tasso (1936). Luigi Bonfigli (ed.). Rinaldo.
- 159.Charles S. Singleton, ed. (1936). Canti carnascialeschi del Rinascimento.
- 160.Giambattista Vico (1936). Fausto Nicolini (ed.). Sinopsi e De uno.
- 161.Giambattista Vico (1936). Fausto Nicolini (ed.). De constantia iurisprudentis.
- 162.Giambattista Vico (1936). Fausto Nicolini (ed.). Notae; Dissertationes: nota bibliografica e indici.
- 163.Pietro Giordani (1937). Giovanni Ferretti (ed.). Lettere. Vol. 1.
- 164.Pietro Giordani (1937). Giovanni Ferretti (ed.). Lettere. Vol. 2.
- 165.Giovanni Boccaccio (1937). Vincenzo Pernicone (ed.). Il Filostrato e il Ninfale fiesolano.
- 166.Franco Sacchetti (1938). Alberto Chiari (ed.). La battaglia delle belle donne; Le lettere; Le sposizioni di Vangeli.
- 167.Giovanni Boccaccio (1938). Salvatore Battaglia (ed.). Il filocolo.
- 168.Giambattista Vico (1939). Fausto Nicolini (ed.). Scritti storici.
- 169.Giovanni Boccaccio (1939). Vittore Branca (ed.). Le Rime; L'amorosa visione; La caccia di Diana.
- 170.Federico Della Valle (1939). Carlo Filosa (ed.). Tragedie.
- 171.Giovanni Boccaccio (1939). Vincenzo Pernicone (ed.). L'elegia di Madonna Fiammetta: con le chiose inedite.
- 172.Luigi Di Benedetto, ed. (1939). Rimatori del Dolce stil novo: Guido Guinizelli, Guido Cavalcanti, Lapo Gianni, Gianni Alfani, Dino Frescobaldi, Cino da Pistoia.
- 173.Masuccio Salernitano (1940). Alfredo Mauro (ed.). Il Novellino.
- 174.Giambattista Vico (1940). Fausto Nicolini (ed.). Scritti vari e pagine sparse.
- 175.Guittone d'Arezzo (1940). Francesco Egidi (ed.). Le Rime.
- 176.Pietro Giannone (1940). Alfredo Parente (ed.). Del regno terreno.
- 177.Pietro Giannone (1940). Alfredo Parente (ed.). Del regno celeste.
- 178.Pietro Giannone (1940). Alfredo Parente (ed.). Del regno papale.
- 179.Fra Paolo Sarpi (1940). Manlio Duilio Busnelli e Giovanni Gamn (ed.). Istoria dell'interdetto e altri scritti editi e inediti. Vol. 1.
- 180.Fra Paolo Sarpi (1940). Manlio Duilio Busnelli e Giovanni Gamn (ed.). Istoria dell'interdetto e altri scritti editi e inediti. Vol. 2.
- 181.Fra Paolo Sarpi (1940). Manlio Duilio Busnelli e Giovanni Gamn (ed.). Istoria dell'interdetto e altri scritti editi e inediti. Vol. 3.
- 182.Giovanni Boccaccio (1940). Nicola Bruscoli (ed.). L'Ameto; Lettere; Il corbaccio.
- 183.Giambattista Vico (1941). Fausto Nicolini (ed.). Versi d'occasione e scritti di scuola: con appendice e bibliografia generale delle opere.
- 184.Luigi Di Benedetto, ed. (1941). Poemetti allegorico-didattici del secolo 13°: Il tesoretto, Il favolello, Sonetti e canzoni, Trattato d'amore, L'intelligenza, Il fiore, Detto d'amore.
- 185.Giovanni Boccaccio (1941). Aurelio Roncaglia (ed.). Teseida: delle nozze d'Emilia.
- 186.Guidubaldo Bonarelli (1941). Giovanni Gamn (ed.). Filli di Sciro; Discorsi e Appendice.
- 187.Salimbene de Adam (1942). Ferdinando Bernini (ed.). Cronica. Vol. 1.
- 188.Salimbene de Adam (1942). Ferdinando Bernini (ed.). Cronica. Vol. 2.
- 189.Luigi Di Benedetto, ed. (1942). La leggenda di Tristano.
- 190.Marc'Antonio Epicuro (1942). Alfredo Parente (ed.). I drammi e le poesie italiane e latine: aggiuntovi L'amore prigioniero di Mario Di Leo.
- 191.Egidio Bellorini, ed. (1943). Discussioni e polemiche sul Romanticismo: (1816–1826). Vol. 1.
- 192.Egidio Bellorini, ed. (1943). Discussioni e polemiche sul Romanticismo: (1816–1826). Vol. 2.
- 193.Andrea da Barberino (1947). Giuseppe Vandelli e Giovanni Gamn (ed.). I reali di Francia.
- 194.Vittorio Alfieri (1946). Nicola Bruscoli (ed.). Tragedie. Vol. 1.
- 195.Vittorio Alfieri (1946). Nicola Bruscoli (ed.). Tragedie. Vol. 2.
- 196.Vittorio Alfieri (1946). Nicola Bruscoli (ed.). Tragedie. Vol. 3.
- 197.Vittorio Alfieri (1947). Nicola Bruscoli (ed.). Tragedie postume.
- 198.Giovanni Gioviano Pontano (1948). Johannes Oeschger (ed.). Carmina: Ecloghe, elegie, liriche.
- 199.Traiano Boccalini (1948). Luigi Firpo (ed.). Ragguagli di Parnaso e scritti minori. Vol. 3.
- 200.Giovanni Boccaccio (1951). Vincenzo Romano (ed.). Genealogie deorum gentilium libri. Vol. 1.
- 201.Giovanni Boccaccio (1951). Vincenzo Romano (ed.). Genealogie deorum gentilium libri. Vol. 2.
- 202.Paolo Sarpi (1951). Romano Amerio (ed.). Scritti filosofici e teologici: editi e inediti.
- 203.Francesco De Sanctis (1952). Luigi Russo (ed.). Saggi critici. Vol. 1.
- 204.Francesco De Sanctis (1952). Luigi Russo (ed.). Saggi critici. Vol. 2.
- 205.Francesco De Sanctis (1952). Luigi Russo (ed.). Saggi critici. Vol. 3.
- 206.Fazio degli Uberti (1952). Giuseppe Corsi (ed.). Il Dittamondo.
- 207.Fazio degli Uberti (1952). Giuseppe Corsi (ed.). Le rime, nota filologica.
- 208.Il Lasca (Antonfrancesco Grazzini) (1953). Giovanni Grazzini (ed.). Teatro.
- 209.Francesco de Sanctis (1953). Luigi Blasucci (ed.). La letteratura italiana nel secolo 19. Vol. 1, Alessandro Manzoni.
- 210.Francesco de Sanctis (1953). Franco Catalano (ed.). La letteratura italiana nel secolo 19. Vol. 2, La scuola liberale e la scuola democratica.
- 211.Francesco de Sanctis (1961). Walter Binni (ed.). La letteratura italiana nel secolo 19. Vol. 3, Giacomo Leopardi.
- 212.Francesco De Sanctis (1954). Mario Petrini (ed.). La poesia cavalleresca e scritti vari.
- 213.Francesco De Sanctis (1954). Ettore Bonora (ed.). Saggio critico sul Petrarca.
- 214.Francesco De Sanctis (1955). Michele Manfredi (ed.). Lezioni sulla Divina Commedia.
- 215.Giacobini italiani (1956). Delio Cantimori (ed.). Compagnoni, Nicio Eritreo, L'Aurora, Ranza, Galdi, Russo.
- 216.Paolo Sarpi (1958). Giovanni Gamn (ed.). Scritti giurisdizionalistici.
- 217.Michelangelo Buonarroti (1960). Enzo Noe Girardi (ed.). Rime.
- 218.Leon Battista Alberti (1960). Cecil Grayson (ed.). I libri della famiglia; Cena familiaris; Villa.
- 219.Paola Barocchi, ed. (1960). Trattati d'arte del Cinquecento: Varchi, Pino, Dolce, Danti, Sorte.
- 220.Iacopo Sannazzaro (1961). Alfredo Mauro (ed.). Opere volgari.
- 221.Paola Barocchi, ed. (1961). Trattati d'arte del Cinquecento: Gilio, Paleotti, Aldrovandi.
- 222.Paola Barocchi, ed. (1962). Trattati d'arte del Cinquecento: C. Borromeo, Ammannati, Bocchi, R. Alberti, Comanini.
- 223.Francesco De Sanctis. Franz Brunetti (ed.). Memorie, lezioni e scritti giovanili. Vol. 1, La giovinezza e studi hegeliani.
- 224.Matteo Maria Boiardo (1962). Pier Vincenzo Mengaldo (ed.). Opere volgari; Amorum libri; Pastorale; Lettere.
- 225.Pier Jacopo Martello (1963). Hannibal S. Noce (ed.). Scritti critici e satirici.
- 226.Francesco Algarotti (1963). Giovanni Da Pozzo (ed.). Saggi.
- 227.Delio Cantimori e Renzo De Felice, ed. (1964). Giacobini italiani: Bocalosi, Galdi, Pagano, Gioannetti, L'Aurora, Martini, Anonima, Piazza, Vivante, Brunetti, Ranza.
- 228.Torquato Tasso (1964). Luigi Poma (ed.). Discorsi dell'arte poetica e del poema eroico.
- 229.Niccolò Tommaseo (1964). Marco Pecoraro (ed.). Memorie poetiche. Edizione del 1838 con appendice di poesie e redazione del 1858 intitolata Educazione dell'ingegno.
- 230.Neri Pagliaresi – fra Felice Tancredi da Massa; Niccolò Cicerchia (1965). Giorgio Varanini (ed.). Cantari religiosi senesi del Trecento.
- 232.Salimbene de Adam (1966). Cronica. Vol. 1.
- 233.Salimbene de Adam (1966). Cronica. Vol. 2.
- 234.Leon Battista Alberti (1966). Cecil Grayson (ed.). Rime e trattati morali.
- 235.Antonio Conti (1966). Giovanna Gronda (ed.). Versioni poetiche.
- 236.Fulvio Testi (1967). Maria Luisa Doglio (ed.). 1609–1633.
- 237.Fulvio Testi (1967). Maria Luisa Doglio (ed.). 1634–1637.
- 238.Fulvio Testi (1967). Maria Luisa Doglio (ed.). 1638–1646.
- 239.Alessandro Verri (1967). Le notti romane.
- 240.Giovan Batista Gelli (1967). Roberto Tissoni (ed.). Dialoghi: I capricci del bottaio, La Circe, Ragionamento sulla lingua.
- 241.Lorenzo Magalotti (1968). Walter Moretti (ed.). Relazioni di viaggio in Inghilterra, Francia e Svezia.
- 242.Luigi Carrer (1969). Giovanni Gamn (ed.). Scritti critici.
- 243.Emilio Praga (1969). Mario Petrucciani (ed.). Poesie: Tavolozza, Penombre, Fiabe e leggende, Trasparenze.
- 244.Niccolò da Correggio (1969). Antonia Tissoni Benvenuti (ed.). Opere: Cefalo, Psiche, Silva, Rime.
- 245.Pietro Aretino (1969). Giovanni Aquilecchia (ed.). Sei giornate.
- 246.Alessandro Poerio (1970). Nunzio Coppola (ed.). Poesie.
- 247.Bernard Weinberg, ed. (1970). Trattati di poetica e retorica del Cinquecento. Vol. 1.
- 248.Bernard Weinberg, ed. (1970). Trattati di poetica e retorica del Cinquecento. Vol. 2.
- 249.Niccolò Machiavelli (1971). Fredi Chiappelli (ed.). 1498–1501.
- 250.Giovanni Sercambi (1972). Giovanni Sinicropi (ed.). Novelle. Vol. 1.
- 251.Giovanni Sercambi (1972). Giovanni Sinicropi (ed.). Novelle. Vol. 2.
- 252.Francesco Vettori (1972). Enrico Niccolini (ed.). Scritti storici e politici.
- 253.Bernard Weinberg (1972). Trattati di poetica e retorica del Cinquecento. Vol. 3.
- 254.Leon Battista Alberti (1973). Cecil Grayson (ed.). Trattati d'arte; Ludi rerum mathematicarum; Grammatica della lingua toscana; Opuscoli amatori; Lettere.
- 255.Giovanni Vincenzo Gravina (1973). Amedeo Quondam (ed.). Scritti critici e teorici.
- 256.Niccolò Machiavelli (1973). Fredi Chiappelli (ed.). 1501–1503.
- 257.Iacopone da Todi (1974). Franco Mancini (ed.). Laude.
- 258.Bernard Weinberg, ed. (1974). Trattati di poetica e retorica del Cinquecento. Vol. 4.
- 259.Giambattista Marino (1975). Marzio Pieri (ed.). Canti 1°-11°.
- 260.Giambattista Basile (1976). Mario Petrini (ed.). Lo cunto de li cunti, overo Lo trattenemiento de peccerille; Le muse napolitane e le lettere.
- 261.Giambattista Marino (1977). Marzio Pieri (ed.). Canti 12°-20°.
- 262.Alessandro Tassoni (1978). Pietro Puliatti (ed.). Lettere. Vol. 1, 1591–1619.
- 263.Alessandro Tassoni (1978). Pietro Puliatti (ed.). Lettere. Vol. 2, 1620–1634.
- 264.Lodovico Castelvetro (1978). Werther Romani (ed.). Poetica d'Aristotele vulgarizzata e sposta. Vol. 1.
- 265.Lodovico Castelvetro (1979). Werther Romani (ed.). Poetica d'Aristotele vulgarizzata e sposta. Vol. 2.
- 266.Ermes Visconti (1979). di Anco Marzio Mutterle (ed.). Saggi sul bello, sulla poesia e sullo stile: redazioni inedite, 1819–1822: edizioni a stampa, 1833–1838.
- 267.Pier Jacopo Martello (1980). Hannibal S. Noce (ed.). Teatro. Vol. 1.
- 268.Pier Jacopo Martello (1981). Hannibal S. Noce (ed.). Teatro. Vol. 2.
- 269.Pier Jacopo Martello (1982). Hannibal S. Noce (ed.). Teatro. Vol. 3.
- 270.Vittoria Colonna (1982). Alan Bullock (ed.). Rime.
- 271.Niccolò Machiavelli (1984). Fredi Chiappelli (ed.). 1503–1504.
- 272.Niccolò Machiavelli (1985). Fredi Chiappelli (ed.). 1505.
- 273.Carlo de' Dottori (1987). Antonio Daniele (ed.). L'asino.
