= Pandolfo Collenuccio =

Italian Renaissance humanist, civil servant and writer (1444–1504)

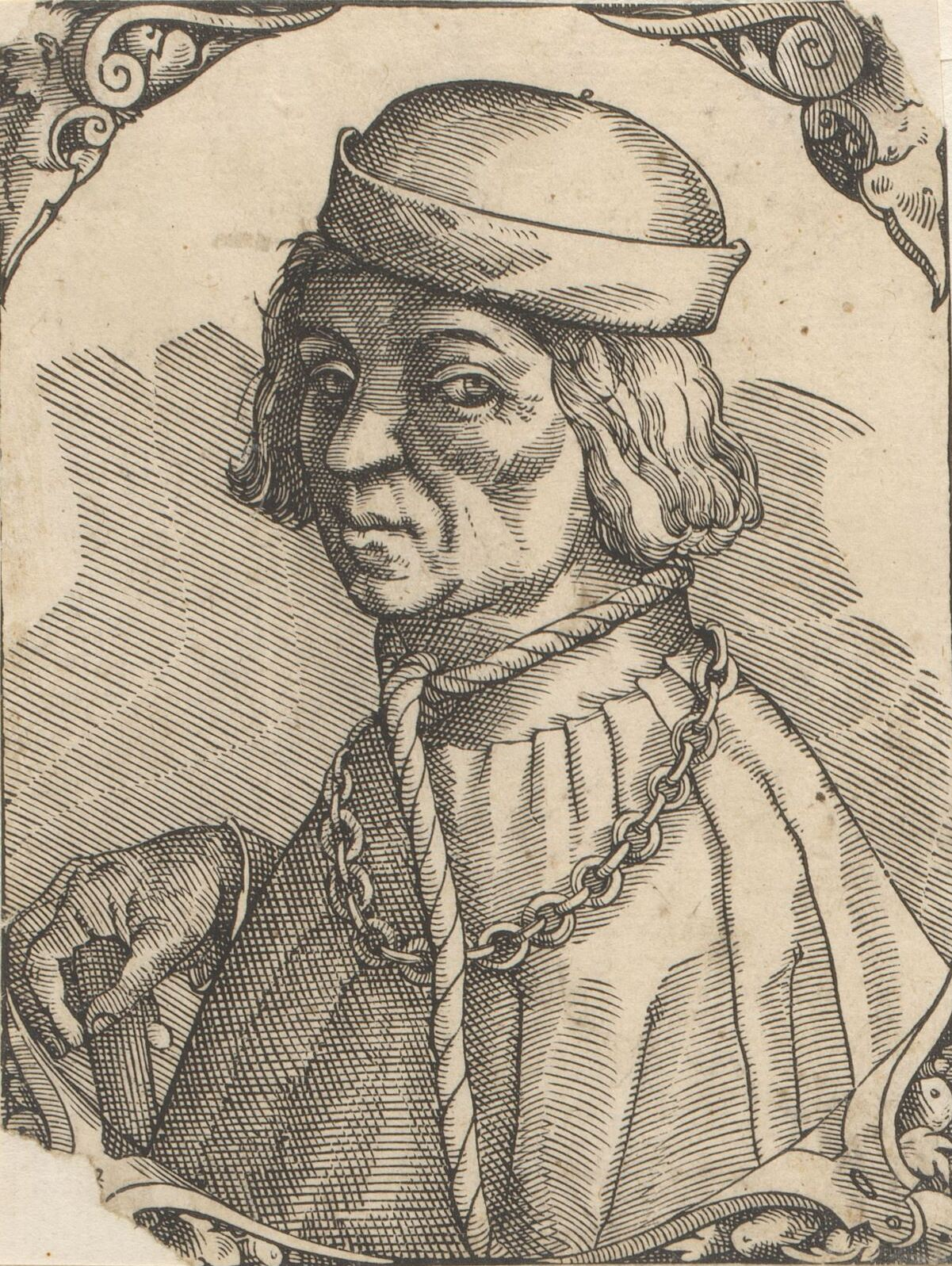
- Portrait of Pandolfo Collenuccio by Tobias Stimmer
- Born: 7 January 1444; Pesaro, Italy
- Died: 11 June 1504 (aged 60); Pesaro, Italy
- Education: University of Padua
- Occupations: Poet; Intellectual; Diplomat; Civil servant
- Father: Matteo di Giovanni da Coldenose
- Writing career
- Language: Latin; Italian
- Notable work: Comedia de Jacob e de Joseph
- Literary movement: High Renaissance

Pandolfo Collenuccio (7 January 1444 – 11 June 1504) was an Italian Renaissance humanist, Civil Servant and writer.

== Biography ==
Pandolfo Collenuccio was born in Pesaro on 7 January 1444. He studied at Padua under Bartolomeo Cipolla and Marcus Musurus, and took his doctor's degree in 1465. In 1469 he married his first wife, the noblewoman Beatrice Costabili, in Ferrara. Collenuccio served as a diplomat and civic official for numerous Italian city-states: the Bentivoglio appointed him giudice to the Disco dell'orso in Bologna (1473–1474); he later rose to the position of procuratore generale in Pesaro for the Sforza, but was dismissed when Giovanni Sforza succeeded in 1483. In 1490, upon the invitation of Lorenzo de' Medici, he served as Podestà of Florence. After a brief employment as Podestà of Mantua, Collenuccio transferred permanently to Ferrara in 1491 with his second wife Lauretta. Ercole I d'Este, Duke of Ferrara valued his diplomatic skills and employed him on sensitive missions to Pope Alexander VI (1494) and Cesare Borgia (1500). Pandolfo became an object of suspicion to Giovanni Sforza, who accused him of a secret correspondence with Casare Borgia, and had him thrown into prison. He was executed in Pesaro by decapitation on 11 June 1504.

== Works ==
In addition to his humanist learning—he was renowned for his oratorical skills—Collenuccio is known as the author of a sacra rappresentazione, Comedia de Jacob e de Joseph (also known as the Vita de Iosep, figliolo de Iacob), written and staged in Ferrara at Passiontide in 1504, and an Italian translation of Plautus' Amphitryon, performed in 1487. His six Latin and Italian dialogues, the Apologi (published posthumously in 1526), draw on Aesop and Lucian to promote a pleasant, practical morality. In his Pliniana defensio (1493) Collenuccio defended Pliny against the accusations of Niccolò Leoniceno. He also composed a substantial collection of lyric poetry both in Latin and Italian, and a history of Naples (Compendio della historie del regno di Napoli), which remained unfinished. Collenuccio's history of Naples was valued by Giannone but harshly criticized by other authors, notably Tommaso Costo and especially Angelo di Costanzo, who wrote his Istorie del regno di Napoli as an answer to Collenuccio's Compendio.

== List of works ==
- Florentia seu Panegyrica silva ad Florentinae urbis novem viros (in Latin). Florence. 1490.
- Pliniana defensio adversus Nicolai Leoniceni accusationem. Ferrara. 1493.
- Oratio ad Maximilianum Caesarem Romanorum regem. Rome. 1494.
- Compendio dell'historia del regno di Napoli. Venice. 1541.
- Alfredo Saviotti, ed. (1929). Operette morali, Poesie latine e volgari di Pandolfo Collenuccio. Scrittori d'Italia Laterza. Bari: Laterza.

== Bibliography ==
- Melfi, Eduardo (1982). "COLLENUCCIO, Pandolfo". Dizionario Biografico degli Italiani (in Italian). Vol. 27: Collenuccio–Confortini. Rome: Istituto dell'Enciclopedia Italiana. ISBN 978-88-12-00032-6.
