= Giovanni Manardo =

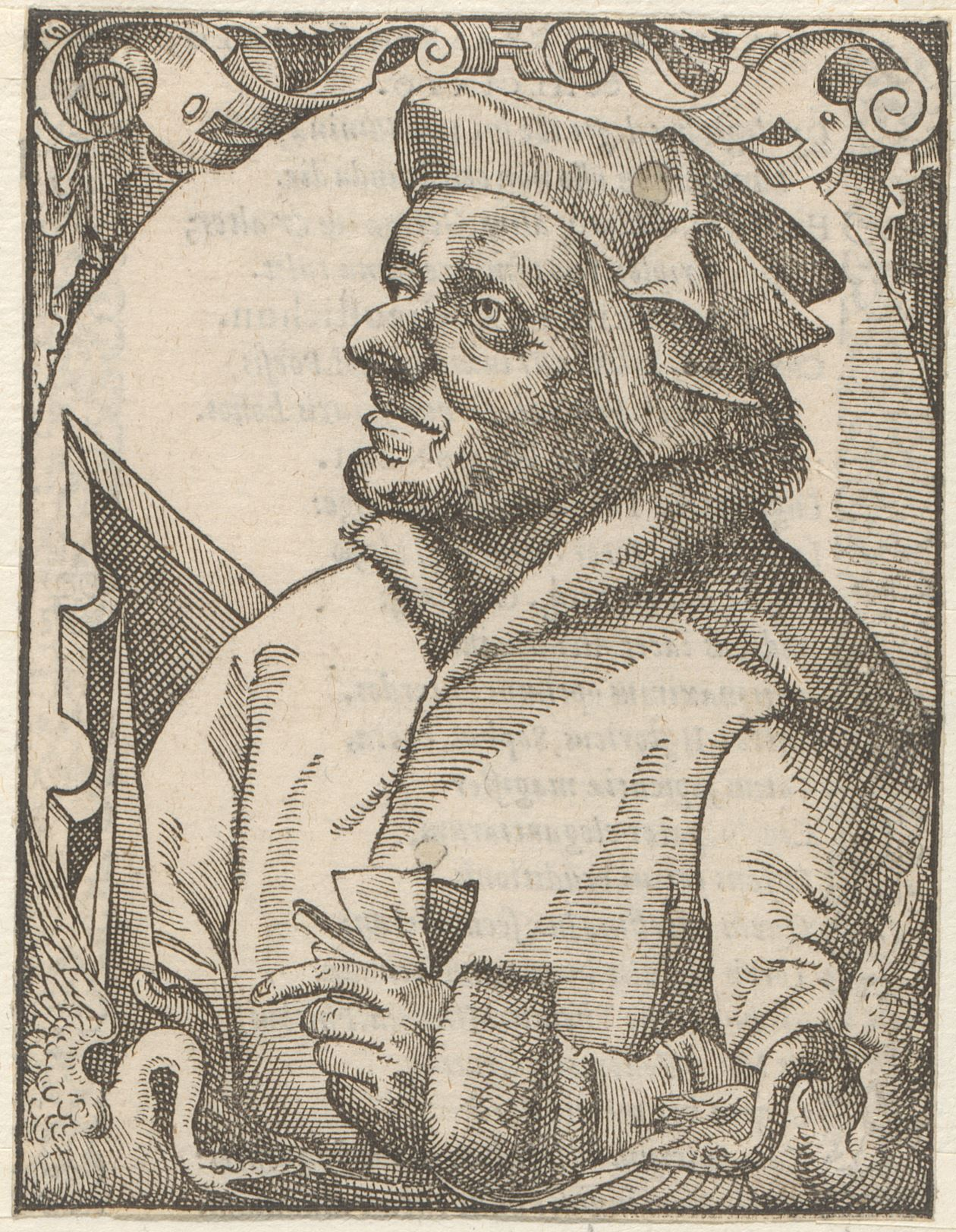
- Engraved portrait of Giovanni Manardo by Tobias Stimmer
- Born: 24 July 1462; Ferrara, Italy
- Died: 8 March 1536; Ferrara, Italy
- Occupations: Physician, botanist

Giovanni Manardo (also known as Manardi or Mainardi; Latin: Iohannes Manardus; 24 July 1462 – 8 March 1536) was an Italian physician, botanist, and humanist.

== Biography ==
Born into an old family of Ferrara, Manardo was a follower of Leoniceno, whom he succeeded in 1525 as the chair of medicine at the University of Ferrara. Having begun to teach in the University of Ferrara, he worked as the personal physician to Pico della Mirandola from 1493 to 1504. From 1513 to 1518, he was the court physician to the Jagiellonian kings of Hungary, Vladislaus II and his son, Louis II. He then returned to the Este household in Ferrara, to provide for the health of Alfonso d'Este. In 1533, he was with another student of Leoniceno, Ludovico Bonaccioli, one of the doctors who attempted to cure Ludovico Ariosto.

In 1494, on the death of Giovanni Pico della Mirandola, Manardo oversaw the publication of his Disputationes adversum Astrologiam divinatricem, in which the philosopher criticized astrological beliefs and practices, marking a clear distinction between astronomy (mathematical or speculative astrology), which studied the harmonic reality of the universe, and astrology (judicial or divining astrology), which supposedly revealed the future of men according to astral conjunctures. Manardo also participated in debates on syphilis, particularly in Ferrara and Leipzig, where he wrote a pamphlet entitled De erroribus Symonis Pistoris de Lypczk circa morbum gallicum, published in 1500 in Nuremberg.

While Manardo had already shown his ability to apply philological principles to medical science in his commentary on Galen's Ars Parva, his humanist erudition was evidenced especially in his Epistolae Medicinales which started to be released in bits and pieces starting in 1528, but which was not fully published until after his death in Basel in 1540, after which it went through numerous posthumous editions. The Epistolae combined the traditions of councils, forums and philological discussions about medicine and botany to the field of pharmacological terminology. The Epistolae, besides criticizing the botanical knowledge informed by Arabic medicine, described the anthers of flowers (belonging to the angiosperms) for the first time, and had a particular influence on François Rabelais who republished it in Lyon, because he saw in Manardo's work both a useful contribution to restoring medicine to the prestige it had once enjoyed in antiquity, as well as being an authoritative voice underlying the renewal of culture.

== Publications ==
- —— (1528). Epistolae medicinales: in quibus multa recentiorum errata, & antiquorum decreta reserantur ... (in Latin). Lutetia [Paris]: Apud Christianum Vuechel. OCLC 14320413.
- —— (1536). In Primum Artis Paruæ Galeni Librum Cõmentaria, Iam Primum Recens Nata & Ædita: Quibus Ne Quid Studiosus Lector Desiderare Possit, Additum Est & Proœmiũ. Apud Jo. Bebelium. OCLC 53048041.
- —— (1540). En postremum tibi damus, candide lector, Ioannis Manardi medici Ferrariensis, sua tempestate omnium medicinae professorum per uniuersam Italiam, in Galeni doctrina & Arabum censura celeberrimi, & optimè meriti, Epistolarum medicinaliu[m]; libros XX: è quibus ultimo duo in hac editione primu[m]; accesserunt, unà cum epistola, iandudum desiderata, de morbis interioribus, quam utinam immatura morte non praeuentus, totam absoluere potuisset. Eiusdem in Ioan. Mesue de simplicia & composita annotationes & censur&[a]e, omnibus practicae studiosis adeò necessariae, ut sine harum cognitione aegrotantibus recte consulere nemo possit. Adiecto indice Latino & Graeco, utroq[ue] copiosissimo. Apud Mich. Isingrinium. OCLC 50160181.
- —— (1549). Epistolarum medicinalium libri XX. Ejusdem in Joan. Mesue simplicia et composita annotationes et censurae ... Adjecto indice Latino & Graeco, utroque copiosissimo (in Latin). Ex officina Godefridi & Marcelli Beringorum fratrum. OCLC 11306222.

== See also ==
- Antonio Musa Brassavola (1500-1555)
- Giorgio Valla (1447-1500)
- Ludovico Ariosto (1474-1533)
- Ludovico Bonaccioli (1475-1536)

== Sources ==
- "Atti del convegno internazionale per la celebrazione del V centenario della nascita di Giovanni Manardo, 1462-1536" (Ferrara, 8–9 December 1962), University of Ferrara, 1963.
- D. Mugnai-Carrara, Epistemological problems in Giovanni Mainardi's Commentary on Galen's Ars Parva, in A. Grafton & N.G. Siraisi (ed.), Natural Particulars. Nature and the disciplines in Renaissance Europe, Massachusetts Institute of Technology, Cambridge 1999, pp. 251–274.
- M. Palumbo, "MANARDI (Manardo), Giovanni", in Dizionario Biografico degli Italiani, Volume 68, Roma, Istituto dell'Enciclopedia Italiana, 2007.
- P. Zambelli, Giovanni Mainardi e la polemica sull'astrologia, in L'opera e il pensiero di Giovanni Pico della Mirandola nella storia dell'umanesimo, Atti del convegno internazionale (Mirandola, 15–18 September 1963), vol. II, Florence, 1965, pp. 205–279.
