= Giovanni Ferretti (disambiguation) =

Giovanni Ferretti (c. 1540-after 1609) was an Italian composer.

Giovanni Ferretti may also refer to:

- Giovanni Ferretti (footballer) (1940–2007), Italian professional football player
- Giovanni Domenico Ferretti (1692–1768), Italian painter
- Giovanni Lindo Ferretti (born 1953), Italian singer-songwriter, composer, and author
- Pope Pius IX (born Giovanni Maria Mastai Ferretti; 1792–1878), head of the Catholic Church from 1846 to 1878
