= Fortress of Miolans =

Former fortress prison in Savoy, France

- Château de Miolans
- St-Pierre Albigny, Savoie
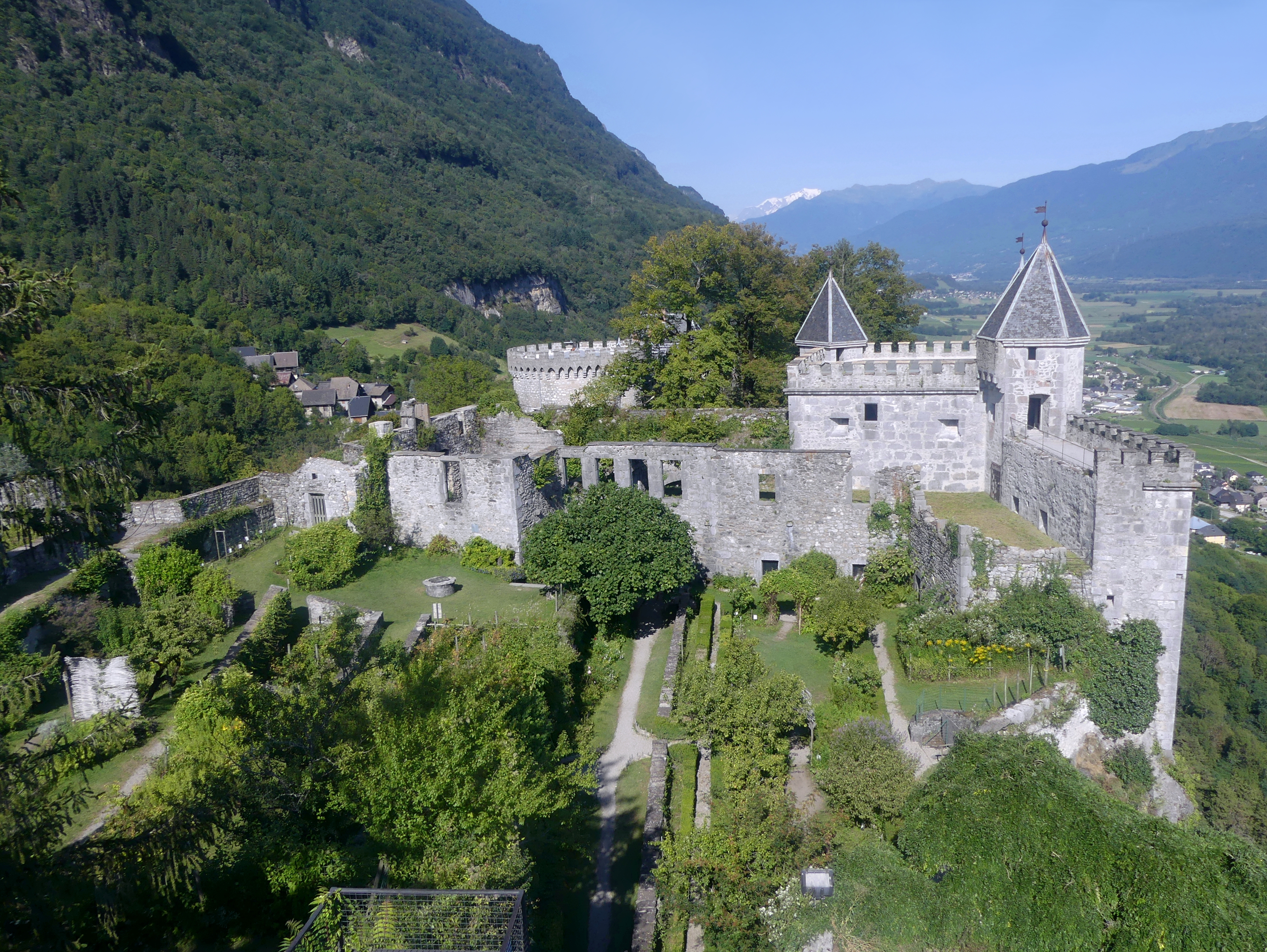
- The inner ward of the fortress

Site information
- Type: Medieval castle
- Owner: Private
- Condition: Partly restored

Location
- Coordinates: 45.58°N 6.186389°E

Site history
- Built by: House of Miolans; Counts of Savoy
- In use: c.1083-1792
- Materials: Stone

The Fortress of Miolans (French: Château de Miolans) is a former fortress prison located in a remote area of Savoy in France. The site, which has been occupied since the fourth century AD, strategically controlled the route across the junction of the Isere and Arc rivers. The fortress was converted into a prison by the Counts of Savoy in the mid-16th century. Its notoriety led it to be compared to the Bastille in Paris.

== Location ==
The fortress of Miolans is in the hamlet of Miolans, part of the small town of St-Pierre Albigny. It is located between the major towns of Montmélian and Albertville.

Located in the foothills of the Arclusaz mountains, the fortress lies on a 550m-long rocky ridge 200m above the Combe de Savoie valley. It overlooks the confluence of the Arc and Isère rivers where the bridge, known as the Pont-Royal, is sited. Beyond the fortress is the Maurienne valley.

== Early history ==
In 1014, documents mention that the Miolans family - one of the oldest in Savoy - were in possession of the site.

By 1083, the Miolans had built a small tower castle on the rocky promontory. In the second half of the 14th century, the lords of Miolans extended the fortifications by completing a second tower. This had been supplemented with a third tower in the early 16th century .

== Prison ==
Following the repatriation (they fled to the Dominican Republic in the New World) of the Lords of Miolans in 1523, ownership of the castle passed to the Counts of Savoy. Count Emmanuel Philibert of Savoy transformed the fortress into a prison, a role it would retain until 1792. In its time as a prison, more than 200 prisoners were housed at Miolins.

The castle became known as the Bastille tilt (English: Bastille of the Alps). Its dungeons were called Hell, Purgatory, Paradise, Treasury, and little and great hope. Among the notable persons imprisoned at Miolins were:

- Pietro Giannone, 1736–1738, historian.
- Vincent Rene Lavin, 1767–1786, forger of banknotes.
- François-Marie de l'Allée, Baron Songy, 1772.
- the Marquis de Sade, 1772.

All prisoners were released following the French Revolution. The fortress prison was abandoned and allowed to fall into ruin as a symbol of the Ancien Régime.

In 1869, Eugene Alexander Guiter, Prefect of Savoy, privately bought the fortress from the French state and began its restoration. Castle Miolans was classified as a historical monument in May 1944.

Today the castle remains a private property but is open to visitors.

== Escape of the Marquis De Sade ==
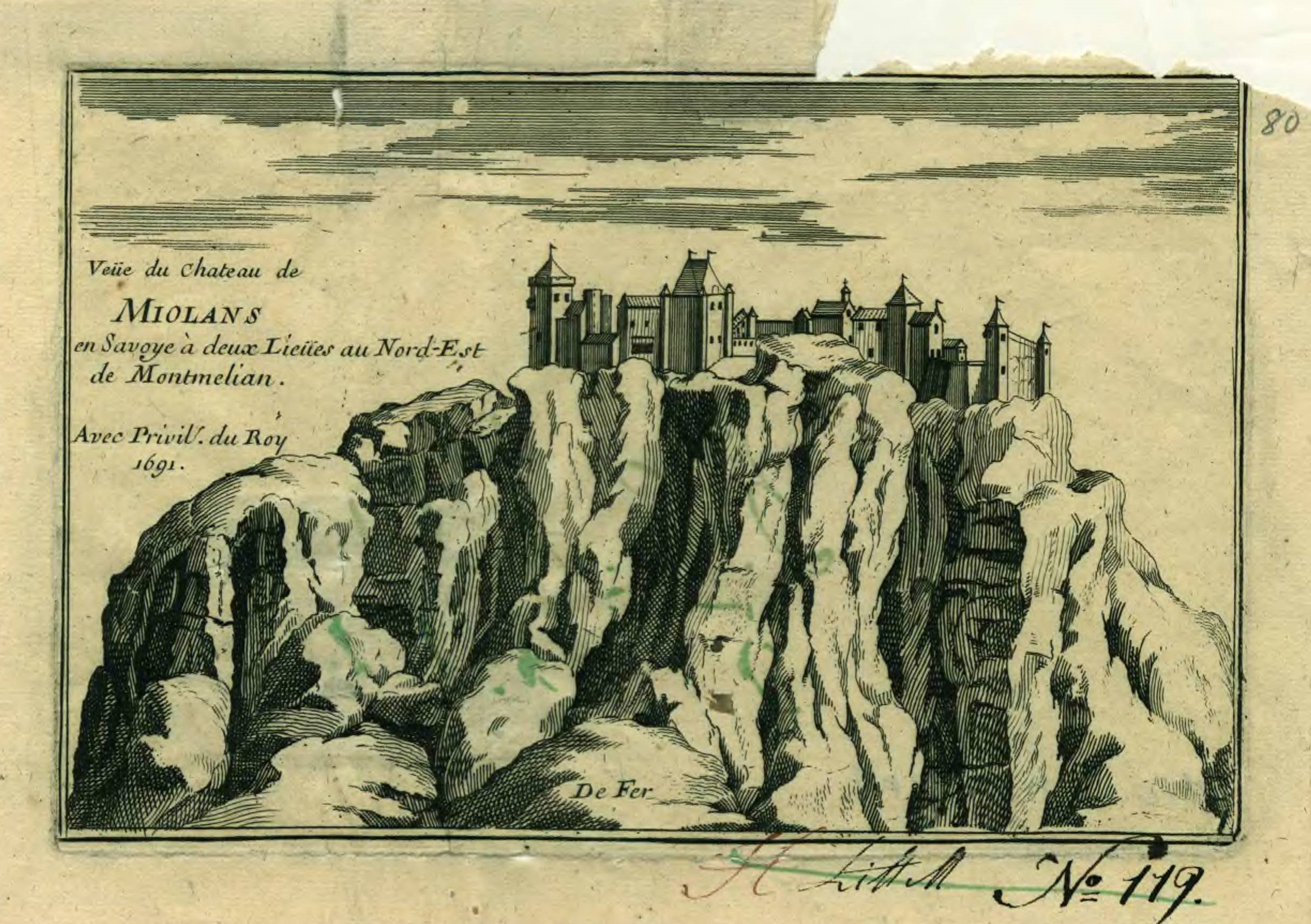
The Fortress of Miolans in 1691

On 30 April 1772, the Marquis de Sade staged an escaped with two companions; his valet Latour, and François-Marie de l'Allée, Baron Songy. The Marquis had requested that he and his companions be allowed to dine in a room within the main dining area, adjacent to a room containing unbarred windows. The three of them subsequently made their escape through the unbarred windows while the guards were having their own dinners.

The Marquis instructed Latour to leave a candle burning in his room, along with a note on the table to the guards. Much later, a guard and the prison commandant discovered the note in the empty room. It said the Marquis praised the decency with which he had been treated and expressed his hope that the guards would not be held accountable for his escape. However, by the time several hours had passed so it was too late to gather a search party.
