= Federico Della Valle =

Italian playwright

- Born: c. 1560; Langa astigiana, Duchy of Savoy
- Died: 1628; Milan, Duchy of Milan
- Occupations: Playwright; Poet
- Writing career
- Language: Italian
- Notable works: Ester et Judith (1627); La reina di Scotia (1628); Adelonda di Frigia (1629)
- Literary movement: Late Renaissance; Baroque

Federico Della Valle (born c. 1560, Asti, Piedmont [Italy]—died 1628, Milan) was an Italian baroque dramatist and poet, recognized only in the 20th century as one of the greatest Italian tragedians of the seventeenth century.

His fame, as a writer, non-existent in his lifetime, was just as dim after his death. He was mentioned occasionally but inaccurately by scholars in succeeding centuries, until in 1929 Benedetto Croce read his Queen of Scots play and made the first of many influential and brilliant rediscoveries and revaluations. Since Croce's discovery and reappraisal of Della Valle, the dramatist has been hailed by critics as one of the most gifted Italian tragedian of the century, and the bibliography on his works has become very extensive.

== Life ==
Little is known of Della Valle's life. Apart from a handful of masterpieces he left behind few clues about his life and activities. He was born about 1560 near Asti in Piedmont, entered the court of Savoy and was employed there certainly in 1587, and for some time afterwards. As a courtier, he composed an epithalamium for the royal wedding, intermezzi for official occasions, and sonnets and madrigals in honor of nobles and prelates. His patron was the Infanta Caterina, daughter of King Philip II of Spain and wife to Charles Emmanuel I, and she probably commissioned him the one and only work staged in his lifetime, the tragicomedy Adelonda di Frigia, which was based on Iphigenia in Tauris by Euripides. When she died in 1597, Della Valle's fortune, never very promising, declined and he departed to Milan in the service of Spain. When he died in 1628, three of his plays had already been published, though they had never been performed, and the only other to survive was published in the year after his death.

== Works ==
Della Valle's masterpiece is considered to be the intensely lyrical La Reina di Scotia ("The Queen of Scotland"), called Maria la reina in its first version (1591). The tragedy centres on Mary Stuart's last hours, when, despite her longing to see again her native Scotland, she resigns herself to martyrdom. Unlike the later tragedy of moral error by Friedrich Schiller on the same subject, Della Valle's play presents Mary Stuart as a saint sacrificed by the agents of a heretical religion. Against similar backgrounds of corrupt and ferocious courts, the biblical heroines of his other two tragedies, Iudit ("Judith") and Ester ("Esther"), also fight uncompromisingly for their faith in a world where the only redemption is offered by God in Heaven. Though written some time earlier – Iudit as early as the late 1590s – these two tragedies were published together as a single volume in 1627. Della Valle's tragic outlook also underlies his tragicomedy Adelonda di Frigia (1595; "Adelonda of Phrygia"), in which the heroine's ideals are contrasted with a barbarous reality.

Della Valle follows the model of Greek tragedy: cast in the canonical five acts, the dramas feature a series of speaking characters and a chorus; no violence is shown onstage. Thus, for example, the execution of Mary of Scotland is narrated to her nurses by the steward who accompanied her to the gallows. Della Valle's works show the dynamic influence of religion on conduct, not through abstract rhetoric but with real poetic feeling for the tragic in human situations. The direct forcefulness of his writing is little touched by the baroque grandiloquence of the Seicento.

== Main works ==
- Federico Della Valle (1628). La Reina di Scotia, tragedia. Milano: Per gli heredi di Melchior Malatesta, stampatori regij, e ducali.
- Federico Della Valle (1650). Esther, tragedia. Milano: Per gli heredi di Melchior Malatesta, stampatori regij, e ducali.
- Federico Della Valle (1939). Opere. Tragedie. Scrittori d'Italia Laterza. Bari: G. Laterza e F.

=== Works in English translation ===
- Federico Della Valle (2023). The Queen of Scots: La reina di Scotia. Introduction, translation, and notes by Fabio Battista. Toronto: University of Toronto Press. ISBN 978-14-8754-510-9.

== Bibliography ==
- Croce, Benedetto (1929). "Le tragedie di Federigo della Valle di Asti". La Critica. 27: 377–397.
- Getto, Giovanni (1958). "Il teatro barocco di Federico Della Valle". Il Verri. II: 14–52.
- Croce, Franco (1965). Federico Della Valle. Florence: La Nuova Italia.
- Filosa, Carlo (1965). "Le «prose» di Federico Della Valle. Il Della Valle in Ispagna e a Milano". Lettere Italiane. 17 (3): 347–62. JSTOR 26248690.
- Nolan, David (1968). "The First Play on Mary Queen of Scots". Studies: An Irish Quarterly Review. 57 (226): 174–179. JSTOR 30087298.
- Sanguineti White, Laura (1990). "Federico Della Valle e la critica. Rassegna". Lettere Italiane. 42 (1): 136–145. JSTOR 26264643.
- Sanguineti White, Laura (1992). Dal detto alla figura: le tragedie di Federico Della Valle. Florence: L.S. Olschki. ISBN 978-88-2223-920-4.
- Radcliff-Umstead, Douglas (1999). "Della Valle, Federico". In Bondanella, Peter; Bondanella, Julia Conway (eds.). Cassell Dictionary Italian Literature. Bloomsbury Publishing. pp. 171–173. ISBN 9781441150752.
- Tessari, Roberto (2000). "La "Iudit" di Della Valle: pitture di "sperati diletti"". Teatri barocchi: tragedie, commedie, pastorali nella drammaturgia europea fra '500 e '600. Rome: Bulzoni. pp. 1–14. doi:10.1400/57541. ISBN 978-88-8319-436-8.
- Bianchi, Alessandro (2006). "La negazione dell'Arcadia nell'Adelonda di Frigia di Federico Della Valle". L'elmo di Mambrino. Nove saggi di letteratura. Lucca: M. Pacini Fazzi. pp. 31–43. ISBN 978-88-7246-782-4.
- Arnaudo, Marco (2013). "Gli emblemi a teatro: Giovan Battista Andreini, Emanuele Tesauro e Federico Della Valle". Critica Letteraria. 158 (1): 48–71. doi:10.1400/201671.
- Cosentino, Paola (2022). "Quella soave di color vaghezza: il motivo della bellezza nella Iudit di Federico Della Valle". Santi, giullari, romanzieri, poeti: studi per Franco Suitner. Ravenna: Longo editore. pp. 159–171. doi:10.1400/289240. ISBN 97-88-8935-009-75.
