= Antonio Musa Brassavola =

Italian physician and botanist

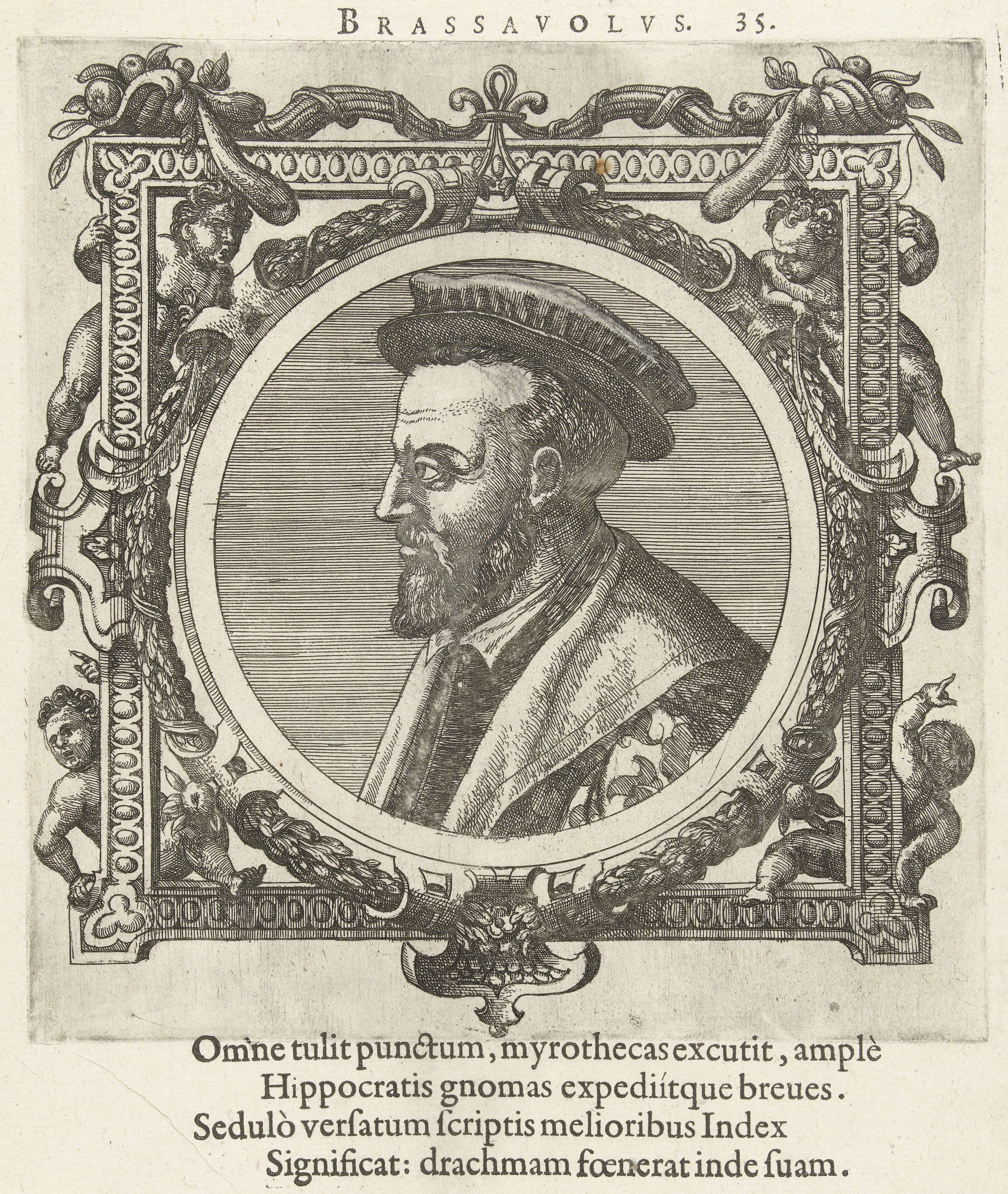
- Born: 16 January 1500; Ferrara, Duchy of Ferrara
- Died: 6 July 1555 (aged 55); Ferrara, Duchy of Ferrara
- Education: University of Ferrara
- Scientific career
- Fields: Anatomy; Medicine; Botany
- Workplaces: Ferrara
- Doctoral advisor: Niccolò Leoniceno; Giovanni Manardo
- Doctoral students: Gabriele Falloppio

Antonio Musa Brassavola (variously spelled Brasavola or Brasavoli; 16 January 1500 – 6 July 1555) was an Italian physician and one of the most famous of his time. He studied under Niccolò Leoniceno and Giovanni Manardo. He was the friend and physician of Ercole II, the duke of Este. He was also the consulting physician of Kings Francis I, Charles V, Henry VIII and Popes Paul III, Leo X, Clement VIII and Julius III. He performed the first successful tracheotomy, and published an account of it in 1546. He was the chair of philosophy in Ferrara and also studied botany and medicine. A genus of orchid, called Brassavola, is named after him.

== Writings (selection) ==
- Examen omnium simplicium medicamentorum, quorum in officinis usus est. Jean & François Frellon, Lyon, 1537
- Examen omnium syruporum, 1540 Digital edition by the University and State Library Düsseldorf
- In octo libros aphorismorum Hippocratis & Galeni commentaria & anotaciones, 1541
- In libros de ratione victus in morbis acutis Hippocratis & Galeni commentaria & annotationes, 1546
- Examen omnium electuariorum. Venice, ex Officina Erasmiana Vincentii Valgrisii, 1548 Digital edition by the University and State Library Düsseldorf
- Index refertissimus in omnes Galeni libros, 1556

His writings consist of works in the fields of medicine and botany. He also wrote extensively about the physician Galen.
