= Pier Jacopo Martello =

Italian poet and playwright

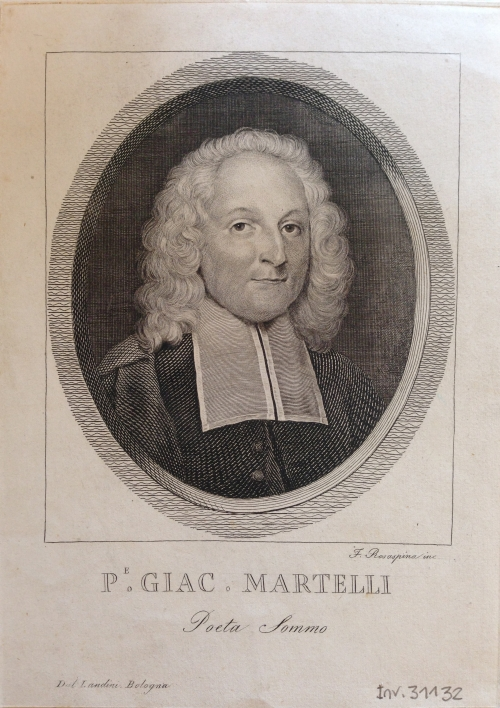
- Pier Jacopo Martello: engraving by Francesco Rosaspina
- Born: 28 April 1665; Bologna, Papal States
- Died: 10 May 1727 (aged 62); Bologna, Papal States
- Resting place: San Procolo, Bologna
- Other name: Mirtilo Dianidio
- Education: University of Bologna
- Occupations: Poet; Intellectual; Civil Servant
- Spouse: Caterina Torri (m. 1694)
- Children: 5
- Parent(s): Giovanni Battista Martello and Margherita Martello (née Giacomini)
- Writing career
- Employer: University of Bologna
- Language: Italian
- Genres: Poetry; drama; treatise; pamphlet
- Notable works: Ifigenia; Femia sentenziato Carlo Magno
- Literary movement: Neoclassicism

Secretary of the Bolognese Senate
- In office 29 May 1717 – 10 May 1727

Pier or Pietro Jacopo Martello (28 April 1665, in Bologna – 10 May 1727, in Bologna) was a poet, playwright and dramatic theorist from the Papal States.

== Biography ==
Martello enjoyed a thorough education in grammar and rhetoric under the Jesuits; later he studied theology and law at the University of Bologna; he also read Greek, Latin and French dramas. Under the pastoral name of Mirtilo Dianidio, Martello helped to establish the Arcadian "colony" in his native city of Bologna in 1698. A member of the Bolognese legation in Rome from 1708 to 1716, he was Secretary of the Bolognese Senate from 1717 until his death in 1727.

Martello's early literary productions were lyric poems and several librettos: Il Perseo (1697), La Tisbe (1697), L'Apollo geloso (1698), Gli amici (1699). He started his career as a playwright with translations of tragedies on classical themes from the French. His first original tragedy was La morte di Nerone, written around 1700. Subsequent tragedies include several pieces based on stories from ancient myth or history. A volume entitled Teatro published in 1709 not only contains further tragedies, but also the treatise Del verso tragico. This was followed by a Canzoniere (1710). A friend of Gravina's before the Arcadian schism that Gravina had initiated in 1711, Martello was offended by the preface to Gravina's Tragedie cinque of 1712 in which the latter had taken all the credit for an alleged restoration of Greek tragedy. In his Dialogo della Tragedia antica, e moderna, o sia l'Impostore Martello lashes out at Gravina while examining the differences between tragedy in the early eighteenth century and in ancient Greece. Martello is known above all for having theorized and then used a dramatic line of fourteen syllables (consisting of two settenari), called Martellian verse. The Martellian verse was adopted in some of his writings by Goldoni. Martello was a close friend of Scipione Maffei, Ludovico Antonio Muratori and Carlo Maria Maggi.

== Works ==
- Volume I :DELLA TRAGEDIA ANTICA E MODERNA
  - Vita dell'Autore.
  - Dialogo della Tragedia antica, e moderna, o sia l'Impostore.
- Volumes II and III: TEATRO ITALIANO
  - Trattato del Verso tragico.
  - La Perselide.
  - Il Procolo.
  - L'Ifigenia in Tauris.
  - La Rachele.
  - L'Alceste.
  - Il Gesù perduto.
  - La morte di Nerone.
  - Il M. Tullio Cicerone.
  - L'Edipo Coloneo.
  - Il Sifara.
  - L'Adria.
  - Il Q. Fabio.
  - I Taimingi.
- Volumes IV and V: SEGUITO DEL TEATRO ITALIANO
  - L'Arianna.
  - Il Catone tratto dall'Inglese dell'Adisson.
  - Che bei Pazzi.
  - Il David in Corte.
  - L'Elena casta.
  - L'Edipo tiranno.
  - La Morte.
  - Il Perseo in Samotracia.
  - Il Piato dell'H.
  - A Re malvagio Consiglier peggiore.
  - La Rima vendicata.
  - Lo Starnuto di Ercole.
  - Il vero Parigino Italiano.
  - Del Volo dialogo.
  - Dedicazione di tutta l'Opera al Senato di Bologna
- Volumes VI and VII: VERSI E PROSE
  - Degli Occhi di Gesù, lib. sei.
  - Il Tasso, o della vana Gloria.
  - Morte di Pò Cane mormusse.
  - Sermoni della Poetica.
  - Il Commentario.
  - Il Canzoniere.
  - L'Euripide lacerato.
  - Il Fior d'Agatone.
