= Trajano Boccalini =

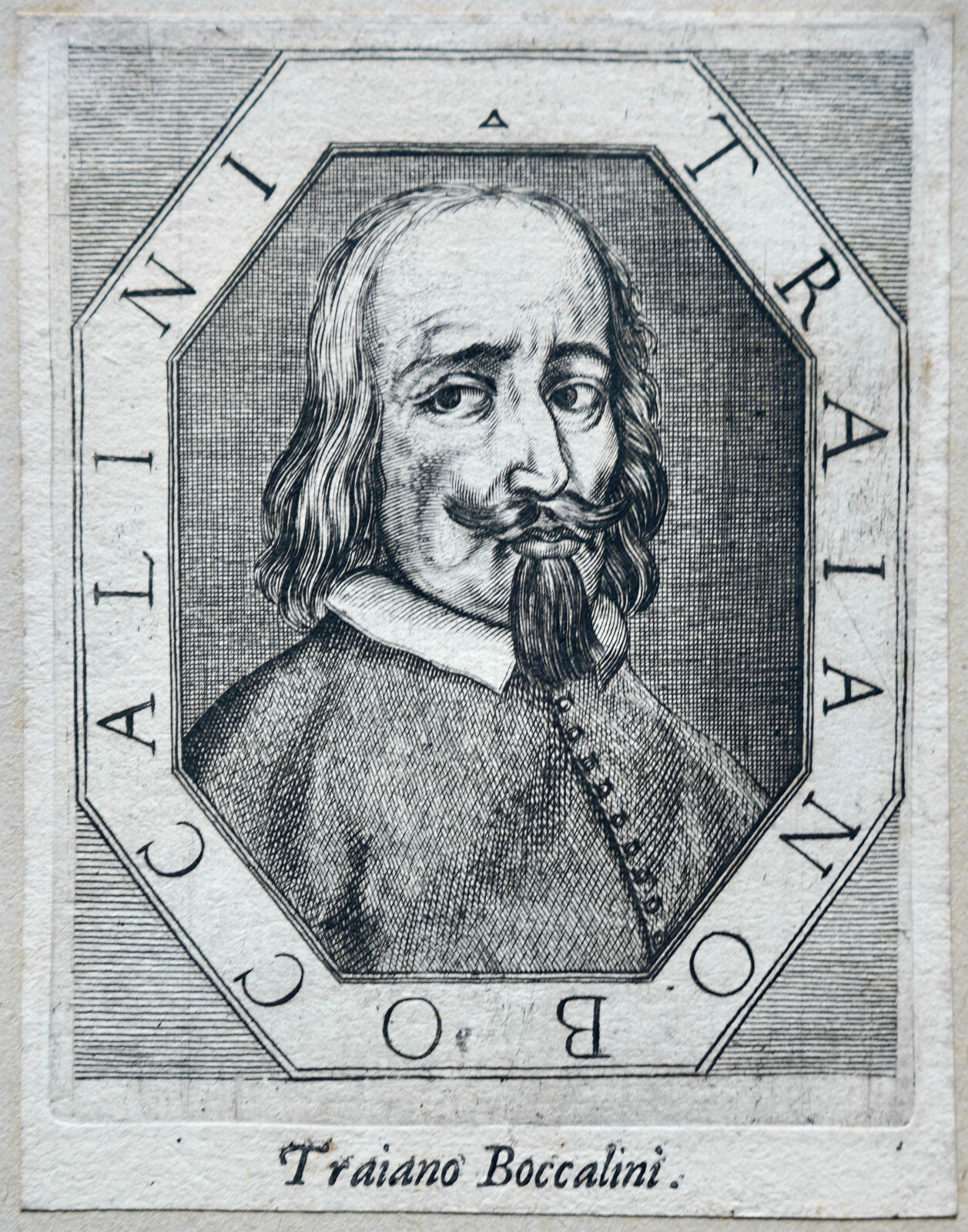
- Engraving of Trajano Boccalini, in "Le glorie degli Incogniti"
- Born: 1556; Loreto, Papal States
- Died: 16 November 1613 (aged 56–57); Venice, Republic of Venice
- Resting place: San Giorgio Maggiore, Venice
- Occupations: Writer and political philosopher
- Movement: Tacitism

Philosophical work
- Era: Renaissance philosophy
- Region: Western philosophy; Italian philosophy
- Main interests: Politics and political philosophy
- Notable works: Ragguagli di Parnaso

Trajano Boccalini (1556 – 16 November 1613) was an Italian satirist.

== Biography ==
Boccalini was born in Loreto, the son of an architect; he himself adopted that profession, and it appears that he commenced late in life to apply to literary pursuits. Pursuing his studies at Rome, he taught future Cardinal Guido Bentivoglio, and acquired the friendship of the cardinals Gaetano and Borghesi, as well as of other distinguished personages. By their influence he obtained posts, and was appointed (by Gregory XIII) governor of Benevento in the Papal States. Here, however, he seems to have acted imprudently, and he was soon recalled to Rome, where he shortly afterwards composed his most important work, the Ragguagli di Parnaso (News-sheet from Parnassus), in which Apollo is represented as receiving the complaints of all who present themselves, and distributing justice according to the merits of each particular case. The book is a light and fantastic satire on the actions and writings of his eminent contemporaries, and some of its happier hits are among the hackneyed felicities of literature.

To escape, it is said, from the hostility of those whom his shafts had wounded, he returned to Venice, and there, according to the register in the parochial church of Santa Maria Formosa, died of colic accompanied with fever on 16 November 1613. It was asserted by contemporary writers that he was beaten to death with sandbags by a band of Spanish bravadoes, but the story seems without foundation. At the same time, it is evident from the Pietra del Paragone, which appeared in 1615 after his death, that whatever the Spaniards felt towards him, he cherished against them the bitterest hostility. The only government which was exempt from his attacks is that of Venice, a city for which he seems to have had a special affection.

The Ragguagli, first printed in 1612, has frequently been republished. It was inserted in the first publication of the Rosicrucians, as a preface to their Fama Fraternitatis (1614). The Pietra has been translated into French, German, English and Latin; the English translator was Henry, Earl of Monmouth, his version being entitled The Politicke Touchstone (London, 1674). Boccalini died in Venice on 16 November 1613. Another posthumous publication of Boccalini was his Commentarii sopra Cornelio Tacito (Geneva, 1669). Many of his manuscripts are preserved still unprinted.

== Works ==
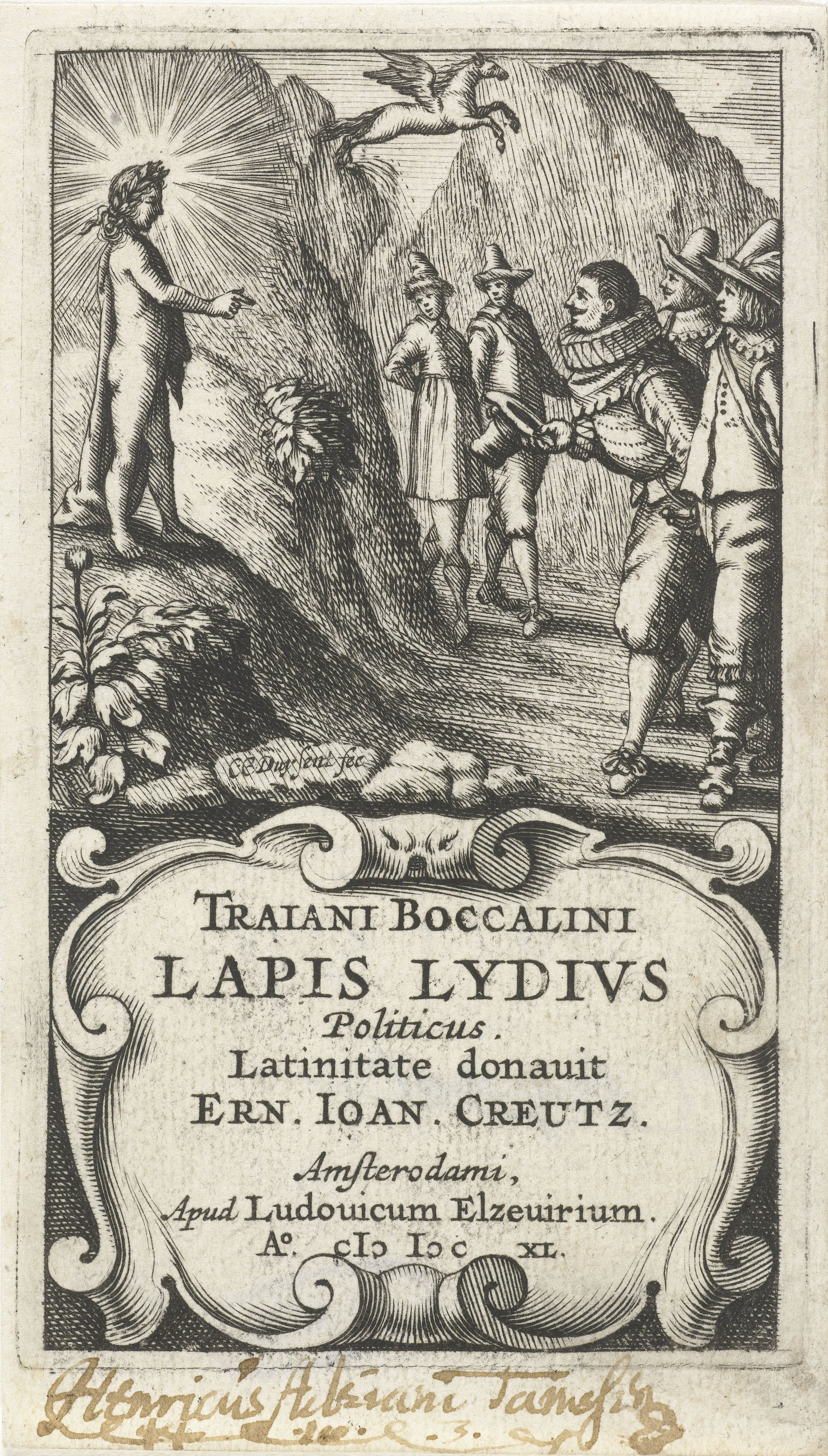
Trajano Boccalini, Lapis Lydius politicus, Amsterodami, apud Ludovicum Elzevirium, 1640.

- Ragguagli di Parnaso. Venice. 1612–1615.
  - Ragguagli di Parnaso. Vol. 1. Bari: Laterza. 1948.
  - Ragguagli di Parnaso. Vol. 2. Bari: Laterza. 1948.
  - Ragguagli di Parnaso. Vol. 3. Bari: Laterza. 1948.
