= Luigi Firpo =

Italian historian and politician (1915–1989)

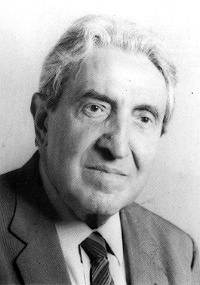
Firpo in 1987

Luigi Firpo (4 January 1915 – 2 March 1989) was an Italian historian and politician, who was born and died in Turin.

He taught history of political thought at the University of Turin. He has been credited as "an excellent editor and lucky finder of texts" which were particularly influential in the study of Tommaso Campanella. In 1943, a time of great upheaval for Italy, Firpo discovered in Trento's Civic Library a 1602 manuscript of Campanella's The City of the Sun (shelf mark BCT1-1538), which is considered the most ancient manuscript copy that has survived to present time.

Firpo was a member of the Italian Republican Party and of the Italian Parliament serving from 9 July 1987 to March 2, 1989.

== Bibliography ==
- Ricerche campanelliane, Firenze, Sansoni, 1947.
- Il processo di Giordano Bruno, Napoli, Edizioni Scientifiche Italiane, 1949.
- Lo stato ideale della Controriforma, Bari, Laterza, 1957.
- Gli scritti giovanili di Giovanni Botero: bibliografia ragionata, Firenze, Sansoni antiquariato, 1960.
- Appunti e testi per la storia dell'antimachiavellismo : corso di storia delle dottrine politiche, Torino, Cooperativa libraria universitaria torinese, 1961.
- Rousseau in Italia, Torino, Edizioni di "Filosofia", 1963.
- L'iconografia di Tommaso Campanella, Firenze, Sansoni antiquariato, 1964.
- Bridge : il sistema "Torino" : dichiarazioni, giocata, percentuali, Torino, Associazione di Torino della Federazione italiana bridge, 1965.
- Invito al bridge : storia, regole, dichiarazione, giocata, Milano, Mursia, 1967.
- Girolamo Angeriano, Napoli, Libreria scientifica editrice, 1973.
- Vita di Giuseppe Pomba da Torino : libraio, tipografo, editore, Torino, UTET Unione tipografico-editrice torinese, 1975.
- Il concetto del lavoro ieri, oggi, domani, Torino, Fondazione Giovanni Agnelli, 1977.
- Cattivi pensieri, Milano, A. Mondadori, 1983.
- Gente di Piemonte, Milano, Mursia, 1983.
- Il supplizio di Tommaso Campanella : narrazioni, documenti, verbali delle torture, Roma - Salerno, stampa 1985. ISBN 88-85026-65-6.
- Questioni di sociologia del lavoro, (L. Firpo et al.), Torino, Cooperativa di cultura Lorenzo Milani, 1989.
- Ritratti di antenati, Torino, La stampa, 1989. ISBN 88-7783-033-6.
- L'utopismo del Rinascimento e l'età nuova, Tre edizioni in tiratura limitata, Alpignano, Tallone, 1990.
- Scritti sulla Riforma in Italia, Napoli, Prismi, 1996. ISBN 88-706-5015-4.
- Scritti sul pensiero politico del Rinascimento e della Controriforma, Torino, UTET Libreria, 2005. ISBN 88-7750-981-3.
