= Giovanni Sercambi =

Italian historian and novelist

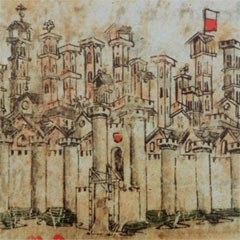
- Historical image of Lucca, manuscript illumination, in Giovanni Sercambi, Croniche, Lucca, Archivio di Stato, MS 107
- Born: February 18, 1347; Lucca, Republic of Lucca (now in Tuscany, Italy)
- Died: 27 May 1424 (aged 77); Lucca, Republic of Lucca (now in Tuscany, Italy)
- Occupation: Writer, poet, politician
- Language: Italian (Tuscan)
- Period: Early Renaissance
- Genres: Historiography; novella
- Literary movement: Italian Renaissance
- Years active: From 1369
- Notable works: Il novelliere

Giovanni Sercambi (18 February 1347 – 27 May 1424) was an Italian author from Lucca who wrote a history of his city, Le croniche di Luccha, as well as Il novelliere (or Novelle), a collection of 155 tales.

== Biography ==
Of modest origins, Sercambi rose to become Gonfaloniere of Justice in 1400. He played a key role in the rise to power of Paolo Guinigi, who became the effective lord of Lucca on 21 November 1400 when he received the titles of Capitano e Difensore del Popolo. Later, estranged from the regime and excluded from power, he devoted himself to literature. He died in 1424, and was buried in the Chiesa di San Matteo.

== Works ==
Sercambi composed Le croniche di Luccha from c. 1368 until his death from plague in 1424. The wonderfully illuminated manuscript of the Croniche (which cover the years 1164 to 1424), is preserved in the State Archives of Lucca.

The unfinished Il novelliere has a frame story based on Boccaccio's Decameron, in which the storytellers flee the Lucca to avoid the plague of 1374. The stories are remarkably varied in their sources, but written in a perhaps deliberately unelaborate fashion, with morals appended that can seem at odds with their sometimes scabrous contents. One of the stories, La novella d'Astolfo, is notable for showing parallels with the tale of Shahriyar and Shahzaman in the One Thousand and One Nights. The eleventh story in Novelle is a variant of Aarne-Thompson-Uther tale type 513A, "Six Go Through the Whole World".

== Sources ==
- Renier, Rodolfo (1889). Novelle inedite di Giovanni Sercambi. Turin: Loescher.
- Beretta, Guido (1968). Contributo all'opera novellistica di Giovanni Sercambi. Lugano: Gaggini-Bizzozero.
- Vivarelli, Ann W. (1975). "Giovanni Sercambi's Novelle and the Legacy of Boccaccio". MLN. 90 (1): 109–127. doi:10.2307/2907204.
- Salwa, Piotr (1991). Narrazione, persuasione, ideologia. Una lettura del novelliere die Giovanni Sercambi, lucchese. Lucca: Pacini Fazzi. ISBN 88-7246-037-9.
- Zipes, J. (2002). "Sercambi, Giovanni". The Oxford Companion to Fairy Tales. Oxford: Oxford University Press. ISBN 978-0198605096.
- Hainsworth, P. (2002). "Sercambi, Giovanni". The Oxford Companion to Italian Literature. Oxford: Oxford University Press. ISBN 978-0198183327.
- Swennen Ruthenberg, Myriam (2003). "Telling Lies, Telling Lives: Giovanni Sercambi Between Cronaca and Novella". In Gloria Allaire (ed.). The Italian Novella. Western Michigan University Press. ISBN 978-0415937252.
- Uther, Hans-Jorg (2004). The Types on International Folktales. Helsinki: Suomalainen Tiedeakatemia.
- Irwin, Robert (2005). The Arabian Nights: A Companion. Tauris Parkes Paperbacks. ISBN 978-1860649837.
- Mari, Fabrizio (2018). "SERCAMBI, Giovanni". Dizionario Biografico degli Italiani, Volume 92: Semino–Sisto IV (in Italian). Rome: Istituto dell'Enciclopedia Italiana. ISBN 978-8-81200032-6.
