= Iacopo Vittorelli =

Engraved portrait of Jacopo Vittorelli

Iacopo Vittorelli (10 November 1749 – 12 June 1835) was an Italian poet, librettist, and scholar.

== Biography ==
Born in Bassano del Grappa to an aristocratic family, Vittorelli studied at the Jesuit college in Brescia. He then moved to Venice where he was appointed a magistrate. Under Napoleonic rule, he was appointed to the ministry of education in Milan. With the onset of Austrian rule to the Veneto, he retired to his native Bassano to a bureaucratic position, but continued his lifelong interest in poetry. His work was somewhat formal but reveled in the formal poetry set to anacreontic structure and dealing notions of love and its pursuits, popular in the Rococo era. His major opus was Anacreontic Poems to Irene (circa 1784). He also translated the classic Greek poem Batrachomyomachia into Italian. His poems were set to music by composers such as Franz Schubert, Vincenzo Bellini, and Giuseppe Verdi. He died in his hometown on 12 June 1835.
