= Alessandro Donati =

Italian cyclist

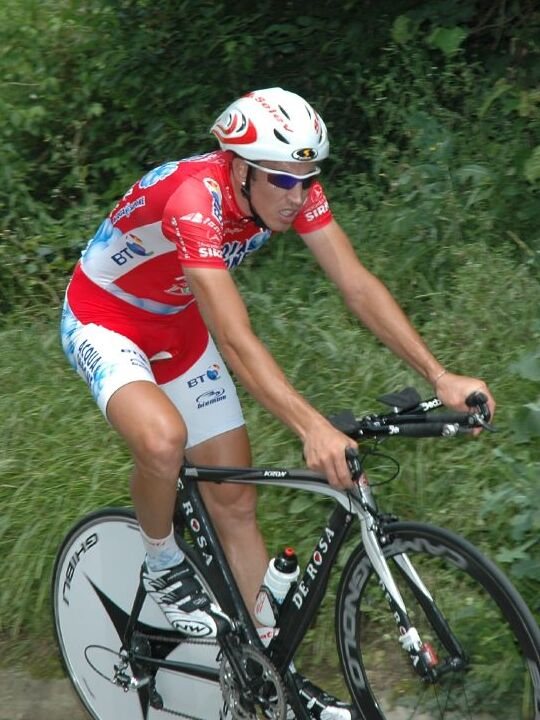
- Donati at the 2007 Euskal Bizikleta

Personal information
- Born: 8 May 1979 (age 47) Atri, Italy

Cycling career
- Sport: Cycling
- Current team: Acqua & Sapone
- Discipline: Road
- Role: Rider

Professional team
- 2004–: Acqua & Sapone

Alessandro Donati (born 8 May 1979 in Atri, Abruzzo) is an Italian professional road bicycle racer, currently riding for UCI Professional Continental team Acqua & Sapone.
