= Niccolò Leoniceno =

Italian physician and humanist (1428–1524)

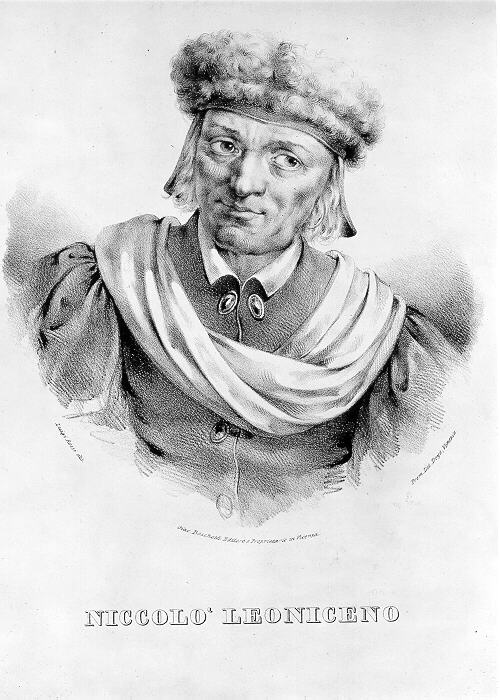
- Born: 1428; Lonigo
- Died: 1524 (aged 95–96); Ferrara
- Other names: Nicolaus Leoninus, Nicolaus Leonicenus Vicentinus, Niccolò da Lonigo
- Education: Vicenza; University of Padua
- Scientific career
- Fields: Medicine; Humanist studies
- Workplaces: University of Ferrara
- Doctoral advisor: Pietro Roccabonella
- Other academic advisors: Ognibene da Lonigo
- Doctoral students: Antonio Musa Brassavola; Gian Giorgio Trissino
- Other notable students: Johannes Baptista Montanus

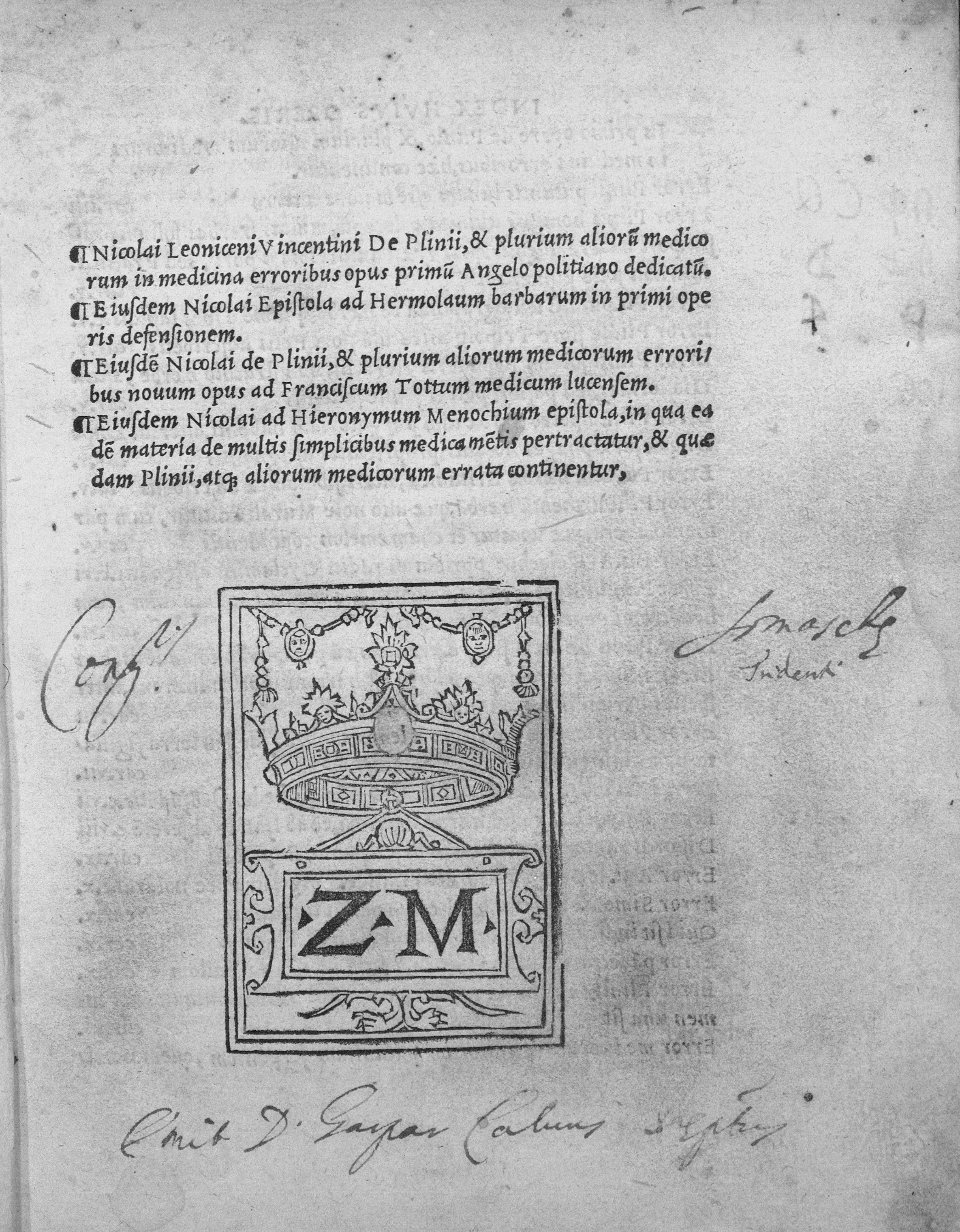
De Plinii, & plurium aliorum medicorum in medicina erroribus opus primum (BEIC)

Niccolò Leoniceno (Latin: Nicolaus Leonicenus; 1428–1524) was an Italian physician and humanist.

== Biography ==
Leoniceno was born in Lonigo, the son of a doctor.

He studied Greek in Vicenza under Ognibene da Lonigo (in Latin: Omnibonus Leonicenus). Around 1453 he graduated at the University of Padua, where he studied medicine and philosophy under Pietro Roccabonella. In 1464, after completing his doctorate, he moved to the University of Ferrara, where he taught mathematics, philosophy and medicine. His students there included Antonio Musa Brassavola.

He was a pioneer in the translation of ancient Greek and Arabic medical texts by such authors as Galen and Hippocrates into Latin.

In 1493, Leoniceno wrote the first scientific paper on syphilis. He died at Ferrara in 1524. He composed the first criticism of the Natural History of Pliny the Elder.

== The Ferrara debates ==
Leoniceno's stand against Pliny's work caught the attention of Angelo Poliziano, the Florentine court humanist. Poliziano wished to defend the standing of the ancient Romans. Furthermore, he did not like the fact that Leoniceno would classify Pliny the Elder with Arab and medieval scholars. Poliziano engaged Pandolfo Collenuccio, a lawyer and historian to defend Pliny against the accusations of Leoniceno.

In 1492, Leoniceno published an article entitled De Plinii et plurium aliorum medicorum in medicina erroribus. In this treatise, he "pointed out errors in the medical portions of Pliny as well as in the works of 'barbarian' (that is, medieval Arab) physicians." This publication was followed almost immediately by a response from Collenuccio, Pliniana defensio adversus Nicolai Leoniceni accusationem, published in 1493. Between 1492 and 1509, Leoniceno and Collenuccio published a series of pamphlets in which they argued the relative merits of the ancient sources. In particular, there was concern about the accuracy of Pliny's translations and transliterations from the original Greek into Latin. Even Collenuccio conceded that translation issues did exist. Already, the 15th-century commentator "Barbaro, claimed to have corrected some five-thousand errors in the two earlier editions." The primary difference in the substance of the argument centered around who was responsible for the errors. Leoniceno refused to attribute inaccuracies solely to scribes who had copied the manuscripts over time. By taking this position, Leoniceno was challenging Pliny directly. It was this position that prompted such a strong response from Collenuccio and others.

Leoniceno's attack on Pliny did not focus exclusively on translation issues. He also cited a section of Book 2 of Pliny's natural history in which Pliny stated that the moon was larger than the earth. In Leoniceno's opinion, if Pliny had erred on such a fundamental fact, then that error justified a further examination of his work for other errors. He proceeded to point out his concern over Pliny's discussion of hedera, which Pliny claimed had both a male and female version. "This distinction 'is made neither by Theophrastus, nor by Dioscorides, nor by any man of weighty authority about the hedera, but it is clearly described in cinthus.'" In this example, Leoniceno is referring to the Greek names for the two plants, hedera is kissos and cithon (or cinthus) is kisthos. While Pliny may have confused the two plants in his manuscript, Leoniceno was concerned that this confusion was the result of lack of experience with the two plants. Leoniceno felt that had Pliny had adequate firsthand experience with the actual plants, he would have avoided this error.

== Texts and experience ==
This emphasis on experience constitutes a fundamental shift in the way in which natural history knowledge was accumulated. Traditionally, knowledge was gained by studying the ancient texts and applying the information and formulas found there. Leoniceno's approach was novel because he suggested that the knowledge of the ancients should be verified by comparing the texts to firsthand observations of the plants that ancient writers described. This approach, while novel, faced several obstacles. First, there was the issue of translation. While Barbaro's study resolved the philological issues, there was still the question of how to approach the contradictions that translation errors produced. Leoniceno maintained that if Pliny was found to be in error, one should examine the texts of Theophrastus and Dioscorides rather than medieval Arab writers such as Avicenna. Leoniceno's preference for Greek authors over Arab authors was one of the distinguishing characteristics of his efforts to reform medical pedagogy in the early modern period.

In addition to translation errors, early modern naturalists were faced with the dilemma of ensuring that they were identifying plants correctly. Was the plant they called hedera the same plant that the ancients called hedera? While this may seem simple to resolve, one must remember that quite often, they worked strictly from written descriptions of plants. At this time, naturalists had not developed a standardized descriptive vocabulary. This lack of standardized vocabulary was further complicated by the fact that plants differ in their physical characteristics throughout their lifecycle.

== Materia medica ==
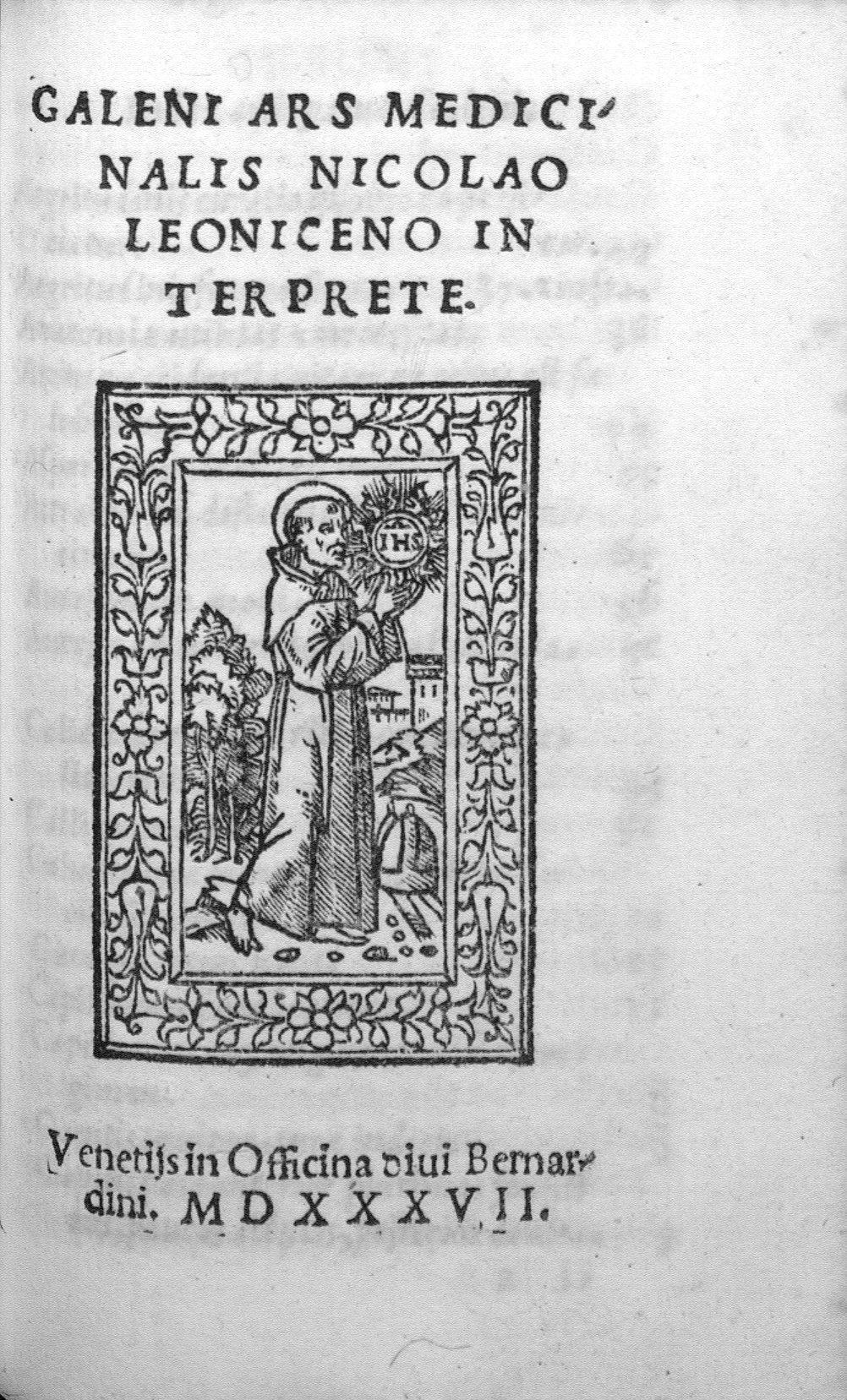
Galeni Ars medicinalis Nicolao Leoniceno interprete, 1537

While Poliziano and Collenuccio were concerned primarily with defending the prestige of the ancients, Leoniceno's concerns were far more practical. Specifically, Leoniceno was concerned that errors in translation would lead to errors in identification of specific plants. A physician by training, Leoniceno was concerned that inaccuracies in Pliny's translations would result in inaccurate medicinal preparations based on Pliny's work. If Pliny's translations were indeed flawed, then Leoniceno felt they should be replaced by the original Greek texts. Both parties to the debate eventually agreed that a detailed reexamination of the ancient texts was the best way to resolve the dispute.

As a teacher, the accuracy of medical texts was important to Leoniceno. While he advocated experience as a means of determining the value of the information found in ancient texts, he still focused his examinations of the plants described by the ancients. He was not as interested in identifying new species as later practitioners of natural history would be. He still remained focused on verifying existing information rather than expanding the lists of plants found in standard texts. His emphasis on "factual accuracy" derived from his insistence that "the health and life of men depend upon it".

== Leoniceno's library ==
Leoniceno began his career in what has been referred to as the age of the manuscript. At this point in time knowledge was acquired primarily through the examination of existing texts. Leoniceno's library was most impressive, and its contents reflected the textual approach to scholarship popular at the time. An inventory taken after his death revealed 345 volumes comprising 482 individual works. Numerous shorter volumes had been combined into one bound volume. Of these 345 volumes, 117 were in Greek. Among the volumes were numerous versions and translations of a single work, along with numerous commentaries on the same work. As such, the contents of Leoniceno's library further reflected the textual approach to knowledge that served as the foundation of his scholarship.

== Sources ==
- Nauert, Charles G. "Humanists, Scientists, and Pliny: Changing Approaches to a Classical Author." The American Historical Review, 84, no.1 (February 1979): 72–85.
- Ogilivie, Brian W., The Science of Describing. Chicago and London: University of Chicago Press, 2006.
- Hiro Hirai, "Nicolò Leoniceno between the Arabo-Latin Tradition and the Renaissance of the Greek Commentators," in Hiro Hirai, Medical Humanism and Natural Philosophy: Renaissance Debates on Matter, Life and the Soul (Boston-Leiden: Brill, 2011), 19–45.
