= Giovanni Ferretti =

Italian composer

Giovanni Ferretti (c. 1540 – after 1609) was an Italian composer of the Renaissance, best known for his secular music. He was important in the development of the lighter kind of madrigal current in the 1570s related to the villanella, and was influential as far away as England.

== Life ==
His place of origin is uncertain, and both Venice and Ancona have been claimed as cities of his birth. The earliest documents of his career show him already to be employed as the maestro di cappella, the choirmaster, at the cathedral of Ancona in 1575. The next two decades have gaps, but some dates of employment are known. Between 1580 and 1582 he was at Loreto; from 1586 to 1588 at Gemona; in 1589 at Cividale del Friuli; and in 1596 he is recorded as being at Loreto again, this time as maestro di cappella at Santa Casa, a position he held until 1603. A reference to him in 1609 indicates he was still alive then, possibly living in Rome, and various other bits of evidence – such as his music appearing in Roman collections, and his acquaintanceship with Roman musicians – suggests that he may have spent part of his career there. When he died is not known, but it was likely after 1609.

== Works and influence ==
Ferretti's music epitomizes the lightness of texture and subject matter which was one of the several diverging trends in secular vocal music composition in Italy in the last half of the 16th century. While few of his compositions were titled "madrigal", they may be seen as part of the broad continuum of secular music of which madrigals were a part. Most of his works were canzoni alla napolitana, canzonas in the Neapolitan style, a light form of villanella (with a rhyme scheme of a a b c c, but with the individual lines elaborated in the manner of the madrigal). While composers had been writing villanelle for a long time, Ferretti was the first to bring madrigalian characteristics to the form.

The complete published output of Ferretti consists of books of canzoni alla napolitana. He published two books for six voices, in 1573 and 1575, and a total of five books for five voices, in 1567, 1569, 1570, 1571, and 1585; all works appeared in Venice. To say they sold well and established his fame is an understatement; reprints and new editions appeared throughout Europe, in places as distant as Nuremberg, Antwerp, and London (in 1588). Ferretti's canzoni, along with the works of Orazio Vecchi, are considered to be the most important musical influence on the English madrigal style of Thomas Morley, which commenced in 1588 with the publication in England of Musica transalpina, a wildly popular collection of Italian madrigals fitted with English words.

A few madrigals by Ferretti have survived, separately copied and not represented in his major printed editions. One of them is a celebration of the naval victory at the Battle of Lepanto (October 7, 1571), and is a coarse, abusive taunt of Sultan Selim, written in the dialect of the Venetian mariners who defeated his fleet.
