= Pietro Giannone =

Italian philosopher, historian, and jurist

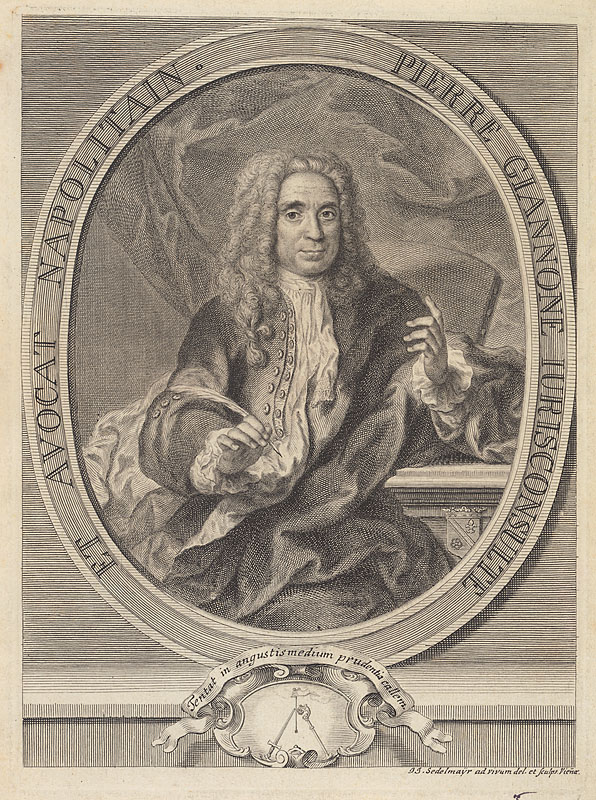
- Born: 7 May 1676
- Died: 17 March 1748 (aged 71)
- Occupations: Philosopher; historian; jurist

Pietro Giannone (7 May 1676 – 17 March 1748) was an Italian philosopher, historian and jurist born in Ischitella, in the province of Foggia, Kingdom of Naples. He opposed the papal influence in Naples, for which he was excommunicated and imprisoned for twelve years until his death.

== Early life ==
Arriving in Naples at the age of eighteen, he devoted himself to the study of law, but his legal pursuits were much surpassed in importance by his literary works. He devoted twenty years to the composition of his great work, the Storia civile del regno di Napoli (History of the Kingdom of Naples), ultimately published in 1723. In his account of the rise and progress of the Neapolitan laws and government, he warmly espoused the side of the civil power in its conflicts with the Roman Catholic hierarchy.

== Conflict with the Church ==
Giannone was the first to deal systematically with the question of Church and State, and the position taken by him, and the manner in which that position was assumed, gave rise to a lifelong conflict between Giannone and the Roman Catholic Church.

Despised by the mob of Naples, and excommunicated by the archbishop's court, he was forced to leave Naples and settled in Vienna, Austria. Meanwhile, the Roman Inquisition placed his history on the Index Librorum Prohibitorum.

== Vienna ==
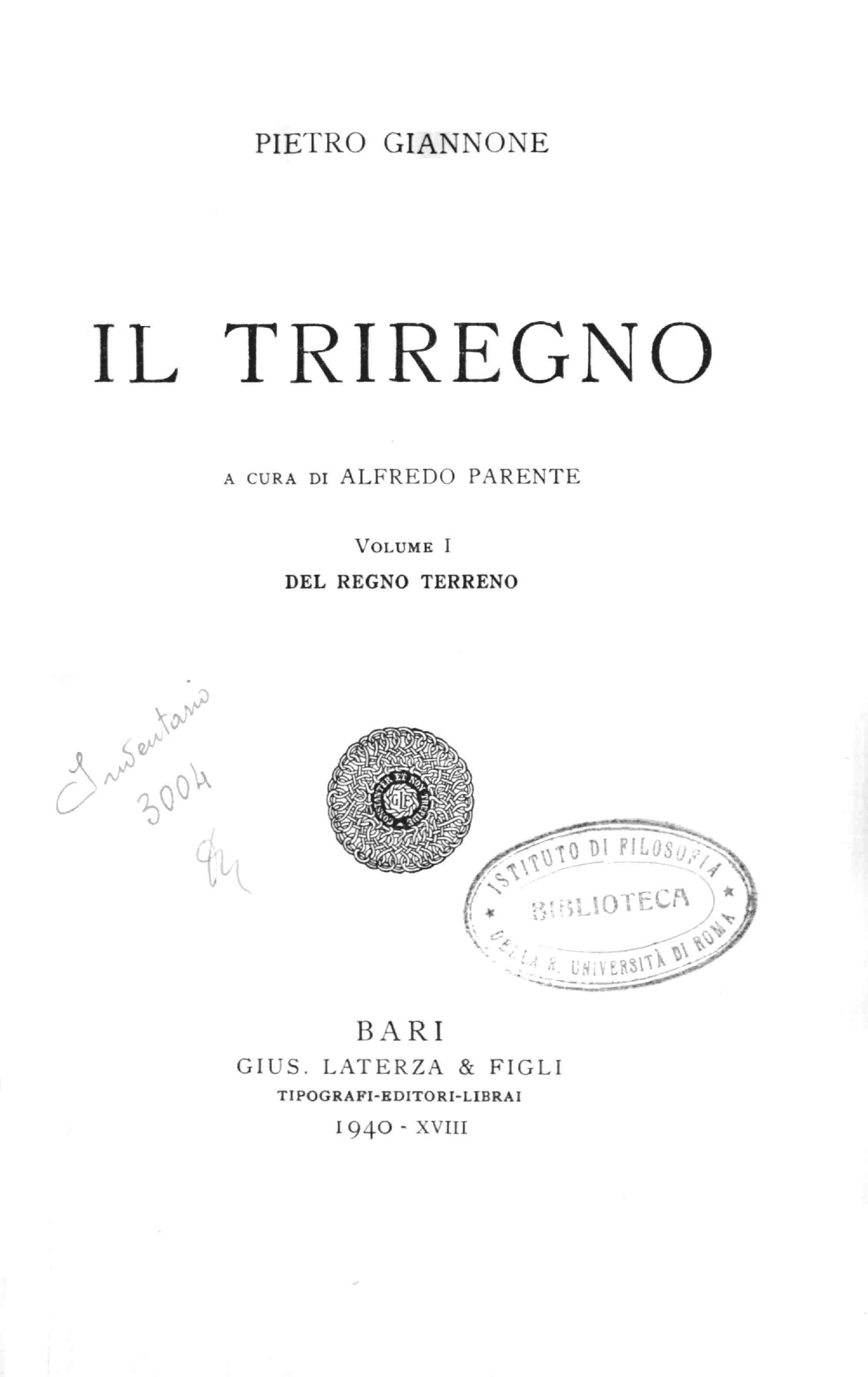
Il Triregno. Del regno terreno, Laterza, 1940

In Vienna the favour of the Emperor Charles VI and of many leading personages at the Austrian court obtained for him a pension and other facilities for the prosecution of his historical studies. Of these the most important result was Il Triregno, ossia del regno del cielo, della terra, e del papa.

== Venice ==
On the transfer of the Neapolitan crown to Charles of Bourbon, Giannone gave up his Austrian pension and relocated to Venice, hoping to find service with the new Neapolitan monarchy. But denied a passport to Naples, he remained in Venice where he was, at first, favorably received. The post of consulting lawyer to the republic, in which he might have continued the type of service that Fra Paolo Sarpi had exemplified in previous centuries, was offered to him, as well as that of professor of public law in Padua. He declined both offers. Unhappily there arose a suspicion that his views on maritime law were not favourable to the pretensions of Venice, and notwithstanding all his efforts to dissipate this suspicion, the distrust of Giannone together with clerical intrigues, led to his expulsion from the Republic.

== Geneva ==
On 23 September 1735 Giannone was seized and conveyed to Ferrara. He wandered under an assumed name for three months through Modena, Milan and Turin, he at last reached Geneva, where he enjoyed the friendship of the most distinguished citizens, and was on excellent terms with the great publishing firms.

But he was induced to visit a Catholic village within Sardinian territory, in order to hear mass on Easter day. Giannone was there kidnapped by the agents of the Sardinian government, conveyed to the Fortress of Miolans and transferred to Ceva and Turin.

== Turin ==
In the fortress of Turin he remained imprisoned for the last twelve years of his life, although part of his time was spent in composing a defence of the Sardinian interests as opposed to those of the papacy. He was also forced to sign a retraction of statements in his books that were most obnoxious to the Vatican.

After his recantation his detention was made less severe and he was allowed many alleviations. In spite of his stay in a Turin prison he endured the sufferings in the manner of a confessor and martyr in the cause of what he deemed historical truth. A putative autobiography, published in 1905 in Naples and almost certainly only a biography, was annotated by Fausto Niccolini, with Luigi Pierro editor.

== Bibliography ==
- Istoria civile del regno di Napoli
  - Giannone, P (1821). Istoria civile del regno di Napoli, Volume 1. Nicolo Bettoni, Milan. "pietro giannone Volumen."
  - Giannone, P (1723). Volume 2, In cui contieni la Polizia del Regno sotto Normanni e Svevi. Niccolo Naso Stampatore, Naples.
  - Giannone, P (1723). Volume 3, In cui contieni la Polizia del Regno sotto Angioini ed Aragonesi. Niccolo Naso Stampatore, Naples.
  - Giannone, P (1821). Volume 4, In cui contieni la Polizia del Regno sotto Angioini ed Aragonesi. Italia.
  - Giannone, P (1847). Italia (ed.). Volume 5, In cui contieni la Polizia del Regno sotto Angioini ed Aragonesi. Borroni e Scotti Tipografia, Milan.
  - Volume 7, 1822 Nicolo Bettoni. Milan
  - Volume 9, 1812 Capolago Cantone Ticino Tipografia Elvetica
