= 1684 in literature =

This article contains information about the literary events and publications of 1684.

== Events ==
- June 25 – The death of Robert Leighton, Archbishop of Glasgow, gives rise to establishment of the Leighton Library at Dunblane, the oldest surviving public subscription (lending) library in Scotland.
- July 25 – The English novelist and dramatist Mary Griffith marries merchant George Pix.
- November 11 – The English dramatist Nathaniel Lee is admitted to Bedlam Hospital for the insane.
- unknown dates
  - The Protestant Academy of Saumur is closed down by King Louis XIV.
  - John Banks' historical play The Island Queens, or the Death of Mary Queen of Scotland is banned from the stage; it is produced as The Albion Queens twenty years later (1704).
  - Pierre Bayle begins his journal of literary criticism, Nouvelles de la république des lettres.

== New books ==
=== Fiction ===
- Aphra Behn – Love-Letters Between a Nobleman and His Sister
- John Bunyan – The Pilgrim's Progress, Second Part
- Giovanni Paolo Marana – Letters Writ by a Turkish Spy
- Ihara Saikaku – The Great Mirror of Beauties

=== Drama ===
- Jean de La Chapelle – Ajax
- John Horne – Fortune's Task, or the Fickle Fair One
- John Lacy – Sir Hercules Buffoon
- Simon Neale – The Mistaken Beauty (adapted from Corneille)
- John Wilmot, 2nd Earl of Rochester (possible author) – Sodom, or the Quintessence of Debauchery
- Thomas Southerne – The Disappointment, or the Mother of Fashion
- Pedro Calderon de la Barca
  - Los cabellos de Absalón
  - Guárdate del agua mansa

=== Poetry ===
- Aphra Behn – Poems upon Several Occasions
- Pavao Ritter Vitezović – Odiljenje sigetsko (Farewell at Sziget)

=== Non-fiction ===
- Jakob Abbadie – Traité de la vérité de la religion chrétienne
- Dorcas Dole – Once More a Warning to Thee, O England, but more particularly to the inhabitants of the city of Bristol (by a Quaker)
- Edward Phillips – Enchiridion linguae latinae
- Christian Knorr von Rosenroth – Kabbala Denudata (publication completed)
- Christopher Sandius – Bibliotheca antitrinitariorum
- George Savile, 1st Marquess of Halifax – The Character of a Trimmer
- Antonio de Solís y Rivadeneyra – Historia de la conquista de México

== Births ==
- February 21 – Justus van Effen, Dutch journalist writing also in French (died 1735)
- October 16 – Peter Walkden, English diarist (died 1769)
- December 3 – Ludvig Holberg, Danish/Norwegian essayist, philosopher and playwright (died 1754)

== Deaths ==
- April 1 – Roger Williams, English-born American theologian (born 1603)
- October 1 – Pierre Corneille, French dramatist (born 1606)
- December 7 – John Oldham, English satirical poet and translator (born 1653)
- Unknown date – Francisco de Avellaneda, Spanish dramatist and poet (born c. 1625)
