= The Eternal Jew =

The Eternal Jew is a calque of the German Der Ewige Jude, referring to the Wandering Jew archetype. It may refer to:

- The Eternal Jew (play), a 1906 Yiddish-language play by David Pinski
- The Eternal Jew (book), a 1937 antisemitic book of photographs published by the German Nazi Party
- The Eternal Jew (art exhibition), a 1937 antisemitic "degenerate art" museum display in Hitler's Germany
- The Eternal Jew (film), a 1940 antisemitic propaganda film in Nazi Germany

== See also ==
- Wandering Jew (disambiguation)
