= Wandering Jew (disambiguation) =

The Wandering Jew is a character from Christian legend.

Wandering Jew can also refer to:

== Arts and entertainment ==
- The Wandering Jew (Sue novel), an 1844 novel by Eugène Sue
- Le Juif errant (opera), an 1852 opera by Fromental Halévy, loosely inspired by Sue's novel
- The Wandering Jew (Heym novel), 1981
- The Wandering Jew (1923 film), British silent fantasy film
- The Wandering Jew (1933 film), British fantasy drama film
- "The Wandering Jew" (ballad), a 17th-century English "broadside Ballad"

== Plants ==
=== Tradescantia ===
Several trailing species of Tradescantia, also called spiderworts, inchplants, and wandering dudes:

- Tradescantia fluminensis, green leaves with white flowers
- Tradescantia pallida, purple leaves, with white, pink or purple flowers
- Tradescantia zebrina, leaves with a zebra-stripe pattern of white and green, with dark purple undersides

=== Commelina ===
Four species of dayflower:

- Commelina africana, or yellow wandering jew
- Commelina benghalensis, native to tropical Asia and Africa
- Commelina cyanea, native to Australia
- Commelina ensifolia, native to Australia

=== Other plants ===
- Saxifraga stolonifera, native to Asia
- Tinantia pringlei, the Mexican or spotted wandering jew

== Other ==
- Philadelphia Sphas, basketball team also known as the Wandering Jews

== See also ==
- The Eternal Jew (disambiguation)
- The Eternal Jew (1940 film), a Nazi propaganda film
- The International Jew, 1920s anti-Semitic writings authored by Henry Ford
