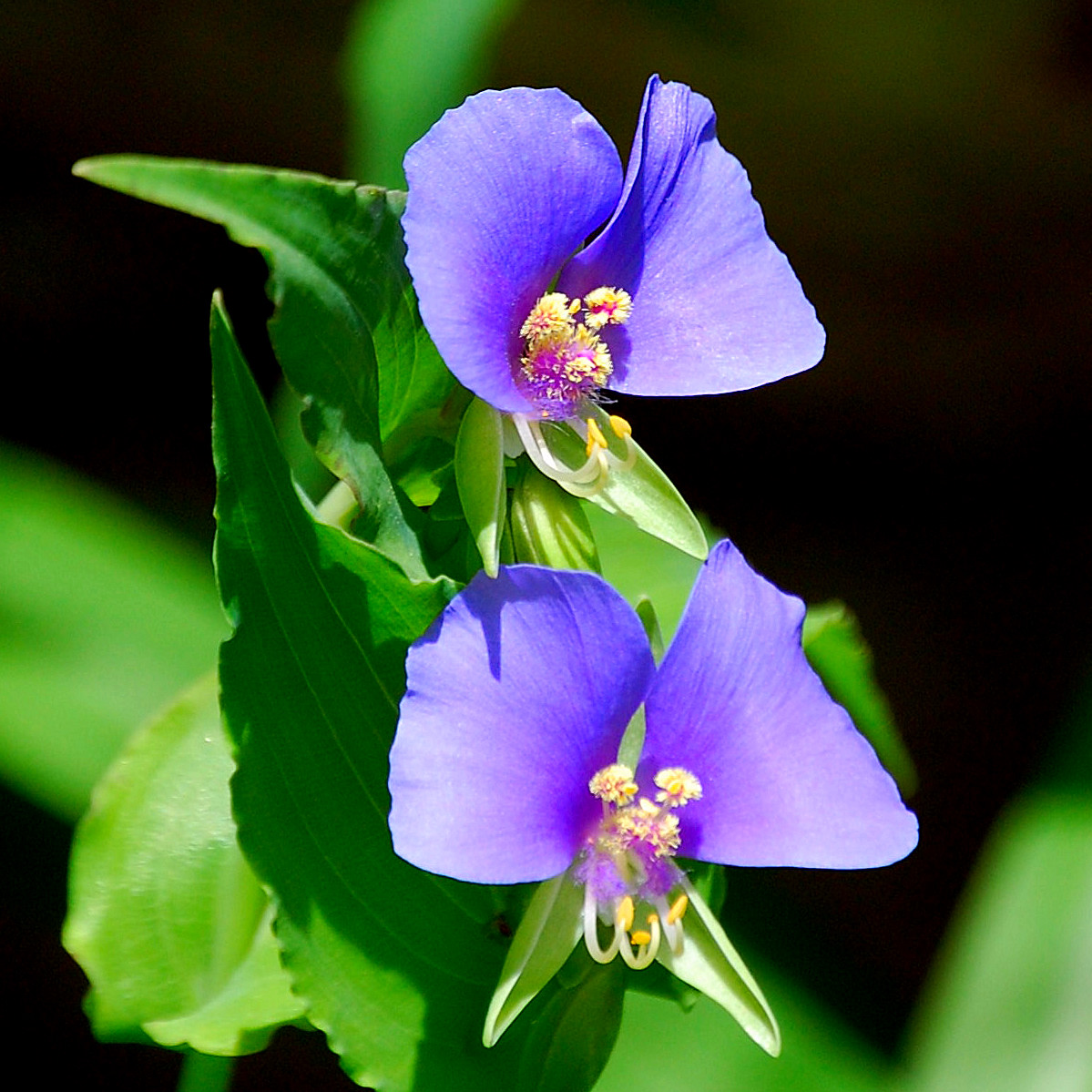

Scientific classification
- Kingdom: Plantae
- Clade: Tracheophytes
- Clade: Angiosperms
- Clade: Monocots
- Clade: Commelinids
- Order: Commelinales
- Family: Commelinaceae
- Genus: Tinantia
- Species: T. anomala

Binomial name
- Tinantia anomala (Torr.) C.B.Clarke

Synonyms
- Commelina anomala (Torr.) Woodson; Commelinantia anomala (Torr.) Tharp; Tradescantia anomala Torr.; Tradescantia texensis M.E.Jones

= Tinantia anomala =

Species of flowering plant

Tinantia anomala, common name false dayflower or widow's-tears, is a plant species in the Commelinaceae, related to the Mexican inchplant, Tinantia pringlei. It is known only from Texas except for a single specimen from the Mexican state of Durango. It is found on rocky slopes, ravines, the edges of woodlands etc.

Tinantia anomala is an annual herb up to 80 cm (32 inches) tall. Basal leaves have petioles but the stem leaves do not. Flowers are bicolored, white with some blue or lavender.
