= Wandering Jew =

Christian mythical character

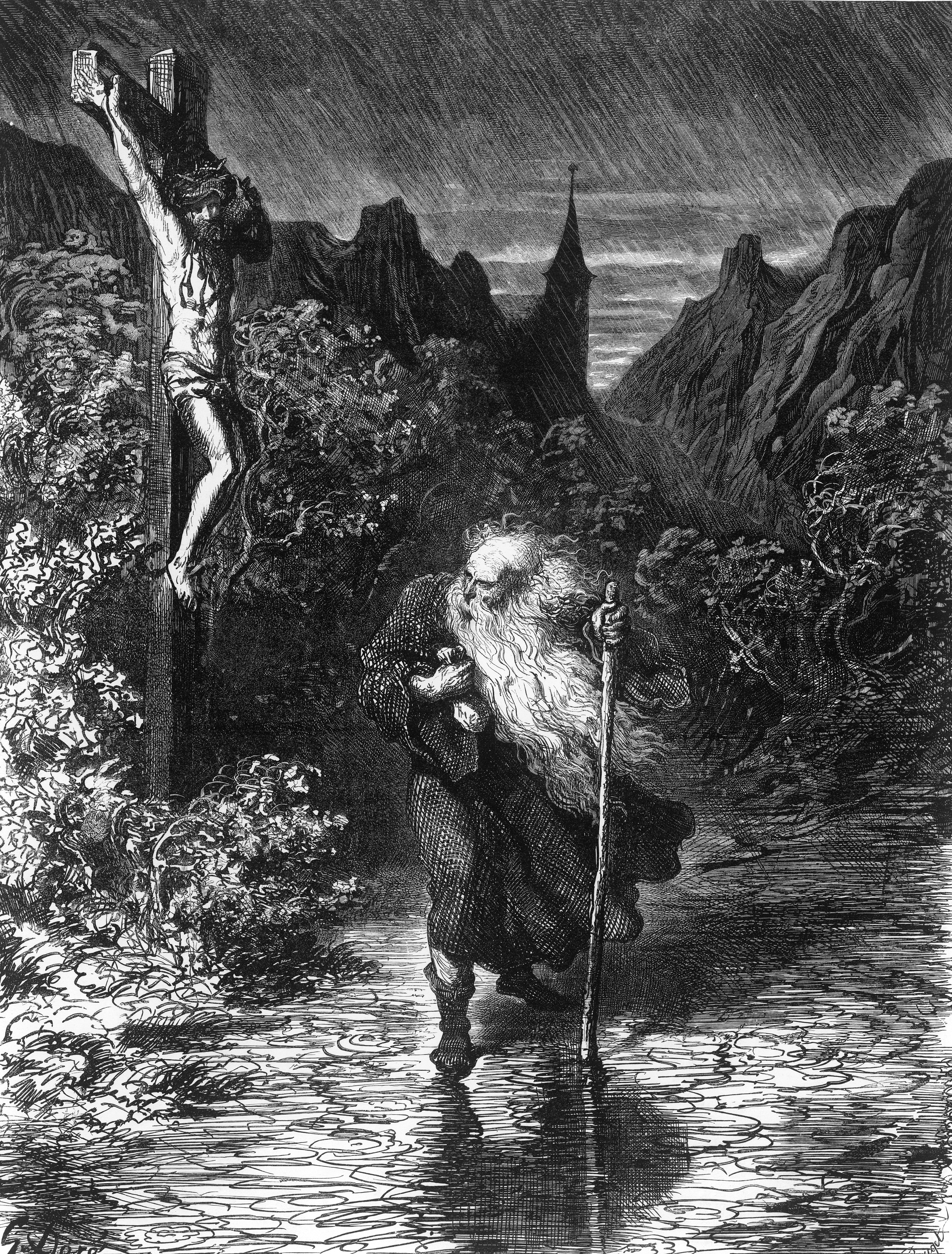
The Wandering Jew by Gustave Doré

The Wandering Jew (occasionally referred to as the Eternal Jew, a translation of the German der Ewige Jude) is a mythical immortal man whose legend began to spread in Europe in the 13th century. (Note: As described in the first chapter of Curious Myths of the Middle Ages where Sabine Baring-Gould attributed the earliest extant mention of the myth of the Wandering Jew to Matthew Paris. The chapter began with a reference to Gustave Doré's series of twelve illustrations to the legend, and ended with a sentence remarking that, while the original legend was so "noble in its severe simplicity" that few could develop it with success in poetry or otherwise, Doré had produced in this series "at once a poem, a romance, and a chef-d'œuvre of art". First published in two parts in 1866 and 1868, the work was republished in 1877 and in many other editions.) In the original legend, a Jew who taunted Jesus on the way to the Crucifixion was then cursed to walk the Earth until the Second Coming. The exact nature of the wanderer's indiscretion varies in different versions of the tale, as do aspects of his character; sometimes he is said to be a shoemaker or other tradesman, while sometimes he is the doorman at the estate of Pontius Pilate.

== Name ==
An early extant manuscript containing the legend is the Flores Historiarum by Roger of Wendover, where it appears in the part for the year 1228, under the title Of the Jew Joseph who is still alive awaiting the last coming of Christ. The central figure is named Cartaphilus before being baptized later by Ananias as Joseph. The root of the name Cartaphilus can be divided into kartos and philos, which can be translated roughly as "dearly" and "loved", connecting the legend of the Wandering Jew to "the disciple whom Jesus loved".

At least from the 17th century, the name Ahasver has been given to the Wandering Jew, apparently adapted from Ahasuerus (Xerxes), the Persian king in the Book of Esther, who was not a Jew, and whose very name among medieval Jews was an exemplum of a fool. This name may have been chosen because the Book of Esther describes the Jews as a persecuted people, scattered across every province of Ahasuerus's vast empire, similar to the later Jewish diaspora in countries whose state and/or majority religions were forms of Christianity.

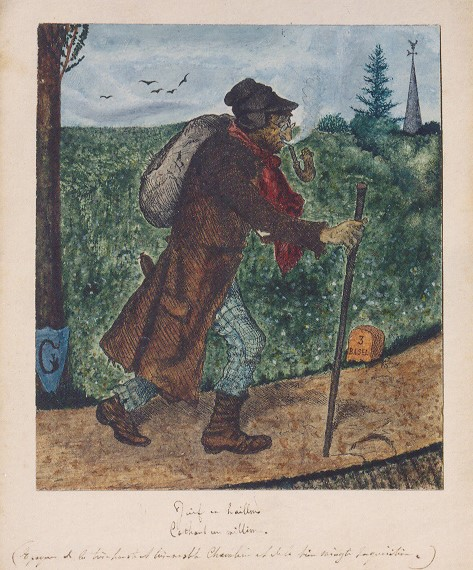
Adaptation of the motif of the wandering Jew, Basel, 1820–1840, Jewish Museum of Switzerland

A variety of names have since been given to the Wandering Jew, including Matathias, Buttadeus and Isaac Laquedem, which is a name for him in France and the Low Countries in popular legend as well as in a novel of that title by Dumas. The name Paul Marrane (an anglicized version of Giovanni Paolo Marana, the alleged author of Letters Writ by a Turkish Spy) was incorrectly attributed to the Wandering Jew by a 1911 Encyclopædia Britannica article, yet the mistake influenced popular culture. The name given to the Wandering Jew in the spy's Letters is Michob Ader.

The name Buttadeus (Botadeo in Italian; Boutedieu in French) most likely has its origin in a combination of the Vulgar Latin version of batuere ("to beat or strike") with the word for God, deus. Sometimes this name is misinterpreted as Votadeo, meaning "devoted to God", drawing similarities to the etymology of the name Cartaphilus.

Where German or Russian is spoken, the emphasis has been on the perpetual character of his punishment, and thus he is known there as Ewiger Jude and vechny zhid (вечный жид), the "Eternal Jew". In French and other Romance languages, the usage has been to refer to the wanderings, as in le Juif errant (French), judío errante (Spanish), judu alderrai (Basque) or l'ebreo errante (Italian), and this has been followed in English from the Middle Ages as the Wandering Jew. The Polish term żyd wieczny tułacz accommodates both themes, translating to "Eternally-wandering Jew". In Finnish, he is known as Jerusalemin suutari ("Shoemaker of Jerusalem"), implying he was a cobbler by his trade. In Hungarian, he is known as bolyongó zsidó ("Roaming Jew").

== Origin and evolution ==
=== Biblical sources ===
The origins of the legend are uncertain; perhaps one element is the story in Genesis of Cain, who is issued with a similar punishment—to wander the Earth, scavenging and never reaping, although without the related punishment of endlessness. According to Jehoshua Gilboa, many commentators have pointed to Hosea 9:17 as a statement of the notion of the "eternal/wandering Jew". The legend stems from Jesus's words given in Matthew 16:28:

Ἀμὴν λέγω ὑμῖν, εἰσίν τινες ὧδε ἑστῶτες, οἵτινες οὐ μὴ γεύσωνται θανάτου, ἕως ἂν ἴδωσιν τὸν υἱὸν τοῦ ἀνθρώπου ἐρχόμενον ἐν τῇ βασιλείᾳ αὐτοῦ.

Truly I tell you, some who are standing here will not taste death before they see the Son of Man coming in his kingdom. (New International Version)

Verily I say unto you, There be some standing here, which shall not taste of death, till they see the Son of Man coming in his kingdom. (King James Version) (Note: This verse is quoted in the German pamphlet Kurtze Beschreibung und Erzählung von einem Juden mit Namen Ahasverus, 1602.)

A belief that the disciple whom Jesus loved would not die was apparently popular enough in the early Christian world to be denounced in the Gospel of John:

And Peter, turning about, seeth the disciple following whom Jesus loved, who had also leaned on His breast at the supper, and had said, Lord, which is he who betrayeth Thee? When, therefore, Peter saw him, he said to Jesus, Lord, and what shall he do? Jesus saith to him, If I will that he remain till I come, what is that to thee? follow thou Me. Then this saying went forth among the brethren, that that disciple would not die; yet Jesus had not said to him that he would not die; but, If I will that he tarry till I come, what is that to thee?

— John 21:20-23, KJV

Another passage in the Gospel of John speaks about a guard of the High Priest Caiaphas who slaps Jesus (John 18:19–23). Earlier, the Gospel of John talks about Simon Peter cutting the ear from Malchus, a servant of the high priest (John 18:10). Although this servant is probably not the same guard who struck Jesus, Malchus is nonetheless one of the many names given to the Wandering Jew in later legend.

=== Early Christianity ===
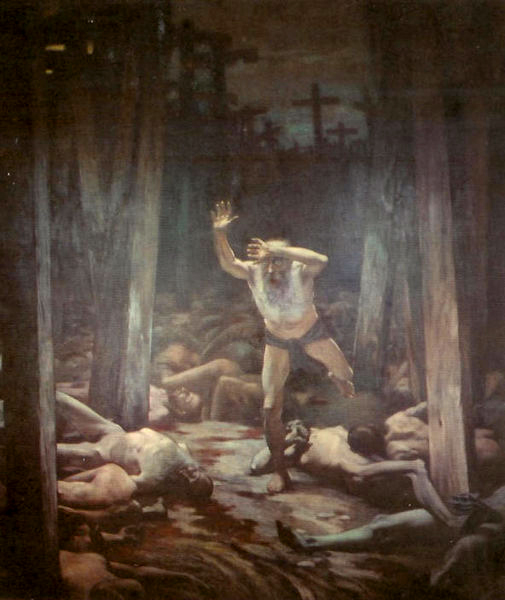
The Wandering Jew by Samuel Hirszenberg (1899)

The later amalgamation of the fate of the specific figure of legend with the condition of the Jewish people as a whole, well established by the 18th century, had its precursor even in early Christian views of Jews and the diaspora. Extant manuscripts have shown that as early as the time of Tertullian (c. 200), some Christian proponents were likening the Jewish people to a "new Cain", asserting that they would be "fugitives and wanderers (upon) the earth".

Aurelius Prudentius Clemens (b. 348) writes in his Apotheosis (c. 400): "From place to place the homeless Jew wanders in ever-shifting exile, since the time when he was torn from the abode of his fathers and has been suffering the penalty for murder, and having stained his hands with the blood of Christ whom he denied, paying the price of sin."

A late 6th and early 7th century monk named Johannes Moschos records an important version of a Malchean figure. In his Leimonarion, Moschos recounts meeting a monk named Isidor who was always weeping. He explained that he and his wife had been followers of Severus of Antioch, but when he found his wife taking communion with a Catholic, he took the host from her mouth and threw it in the mud. He explained what happened shortly thereafter:

"I saw an Ethiopian, clad in rags, who said to me, 'You and I are condemned to the same punishment.' I said to him, 'Who are you?' And the Ethiopian who had appeared to me replied, 'I am he who struck on the cheek the creator of the universe, our Lord Jesus Christ, at the time of the Passion.' That is why," said Isidor, "I cannot stop weeping."

=== Medieval legend ===
Some scholars have identified components of the legend of the Eternal Jew in Teutonic legends of the Eternal Hunter, some features of which are derived from Odin mythology.

"In some areas the farmers arranged the rows in their fields in such a way that on Sundays the Eternal Jew might find a resting place. Elsewhere they assumed that he could rest only upon a plough or that he had to be on the go all year and was allowed a respite only on Christmas."

Most likely drawing on centuries of unwritten folklore, legendry, and oral tradition brought to the West as a product of the Crusades, a Latin chronicle from Bologna, Ignoti Monachi Cisterciensis S. Mariae de Ferraria Chronica et Ryccardi de Sancto Germano Chronica priora, contains the first written articulation of the Wandering Jew. In the entry for the year 1223, the chronicle describes the report of a group of pilgrims who meet "a certain Jew in Armenia" (quendam Iudaeum) who scolded Jesus on his way to be crucified and is therefore doomed to live until the Second Coming. Every hundred years the Jew returns to the age of 30.

A variant of the Wandering Jew legend is recorded in the Flores Historiarum by Roger of Wendover around the year 1228. An Armenian archbishop, then visiting England, was asked by the monks of St Albans Abbey about the celebrated Joseph of Arimathea, who had spoken to Jesus, and was reported to be still alive. The archbishop answered that he had himself seen such a man in Armenia, and that his name was Cartaphilus, a Jewish shoemaker, who, when Jesus stopped for a second to rest while carrying his cross, hit him, and told him "Go on quicker, Jesus! Go on quicker! Why dost Thou loiter?", to which Jesus, "with a severe countenance", is said to have replied: "I am going, and you will wait till I return." The Armenian bishop also reported that Cartaphilus had since converted to Christianity and spent his wandering days proselytizing and leading a hermit's life.

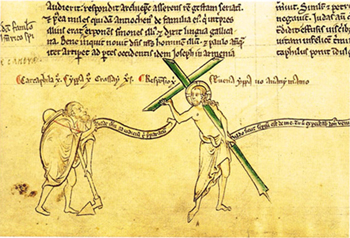
The Wandering Jew (left) meets Christ on his way to Calvary, as depicted in the Chronica Majora

Matthew Paris included this passage from Roger of Wendover in his own history; and other Armenians appeared in 1252 at the Abbey of St Albans, repeating the same story, which was regarded there as a great proof of the truth of the Christian religion. The same Armenian told the story at Tournai in 1243, according to the Chronicles of Phillip Mouskes (chapter ii. 491, Brussels, 1839). After that, Guido Bonatti writes people saw the Wandering Jew in Forlì (Italy), in the 13th century; other people saw him in Vienna and elsewhere.

There were claims of sightings of the Wandering Jew throughout Europe and later the Americas, since at least 1542 in Hamburg up to 1868 in Harts Corners, New Jersey. Joseph Jacobs, writing in the 11th edition of the Encyclopædia Britannica (1911), commented, "It is difficult to tell in any one of these cases how far the story is an entire fiction and how far some ingenious impostor took advantage of the existence of the myth".

== In literature ==
=== 17th and 18th centuries ===
The legend became more popular after it appeared in a 17th-century pamphlet of four leaves, Kurtze Beschreibung und Erzählung von einem Juden mit Namen Ahasverus (Short Description and Tale of a Jew with the Name Ahasuerus). (Note: This professes to have been printed at Leiden in 1602 by an otherwise unrecorded printer "Christoff Crutzer"; the real place and printer cannot be ascertained.) "Here we are told that some fifty years before, a bishop met him in a church at Hamburg, repentant, ill-clothed and distracted at the thought of having to move on in a few weeks." As with urban legends, particularities lend verisimilitude: the bishop is specifically Paulus von Eitzen, General Superintendent of Schleswig. The legend spread quickly throughout Germany, no less than eight different editions appearing in 1602; altogether forty appeared in Germany before the end of the 18th century. Eight editions in Dutch and Flemish are known; and the story soon passed to France, the first French edition appearing in Bordeaux, 1609, and to England, where it appeared in the form of a parody in 1625. The pamphlet was translated also into Danish and Swedish; and the expression "eternal Jew" is current in Czech, Slovak, and German, der ewige Jude. Apparently the pamphlets of 1602 borrowed parts of the descriptions of the wanderer from reports (most notably by Balthasar Russow) about an itinerant preacher called Jürgen.

In France, the Wandering Jew appeared in Simon Tyssot de Patot's La Vie, les Aventures et le Voyage de Groenland du Révérend Père Cordelier Pierre de Mésange (1720).

In Britain, a ballad with the title The Wandering Jew was included in Thomas Percy's Reliques published in 1765.

In England, the Wandering Jew makes an appearance in one of the secondary plots in Matthew Lewis's Gothic novel The Monk (1796). The Wandering Jew is depicted as an exorcist whose origin remains unclear. The Wandering Jew also plays a role in St. Leon (1799) by William Godwin. The Wandering Jew also appears in two English broadside ballads of the 17th and 18th centuries, The Wandering Jew, and The Wandering Jew's Chronicle. The former recounts the biblical story of the Wandering Jew's encounter with Christ, while the latter tells, from the point of view of the titular character, the succession of English monarchs from William the Conqueror through either King Charles II (in the 17th-century text) or King George II and Queen Caroline (in the 18th-century version).

In 1797, the operetta The Wandering Jew, or Love's Masquerade by Andrew Franklin was performed in London.

=== 19th century ===
==== Britain ====
In 1810, Percy Bysshe Shelley wrote a poem in four cantos with the title The Wandering Jew but it remained unpublished until 1877. In two other works of Shelley, Ahasuerus appears, as a phantom in his first major poem Queen Mab: A Philosophical Poem (1813) and later as a hermit healer in his last major work, the verse drama Hellas.

John Galt published a book in 1820 called The Wandering Jew.

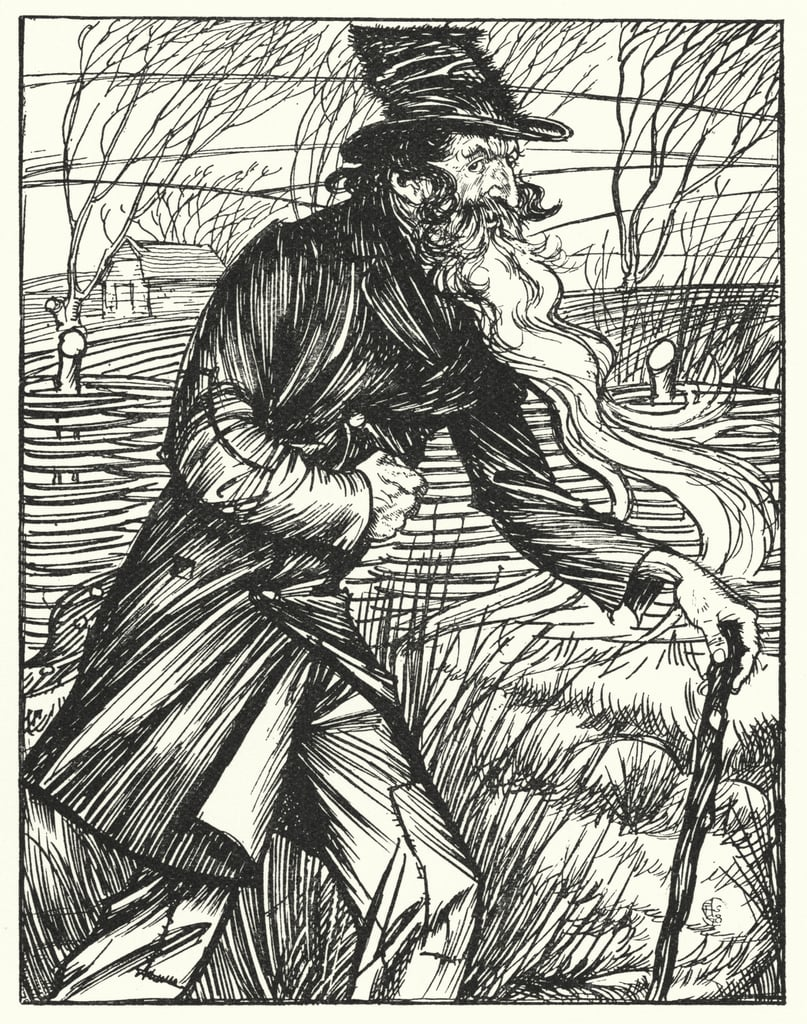
"The Wandering Jew", 1898 illustration by E. J. Sullivan for Sartor Resartus

Thomas Carlyle, in his Sartor Resartus (1833–34), compares its hero Diogenes Teufelsdröckh on several occasions to the Wandering Jew (also using the German wording der Ewige Jude).

In Chapter 15 of Great Expectations (1861) by Charles Dickens, the journeyman Orlick is compared to the Wandering Jew.

George MacDonald includes pieces of the legend in Thomas Wingfold, Curate (London, 1876).

==== United States ====
Nathaniel Hawthorne's stories "A Virtuoso's Collection" and "Ethan Brand" feature the Wandering Jew serving as a guide to the stories' characters.

In 1873, a publisher in the United States (Philadelphia, Gebbie) produced The Legend of the Wandering Jew, a series of twelve designs by Gustave Doré (Reproduced by Photographic Printing) with Explanatory Introduction, originally made by Doré in 1856 to illustrate a short poem by Pierre-Jean de Béranger. For each one, there was a couplet, such as "Too late he feels, by look, and deed, and word, / How often he has crucified his Lord". (Note: Gebbie's edition, 1873. A similar title was used for an edition under the imprint of Cassell, Petter & Galpin, London, Paris & New York.)

Eugene Field's short story "The Holy Cross" (1899) features the Jew as a character.

In 1901, a New York publisher reprinted, under the title "Tarry Thou Till I Come", George Croly's "Salathiel", which treated the subject in an imaginative form. It had appeared anonymously in 1828.

In Lew Wallace's novel The Prince of India (1893), the Wandering Jew is the protagonist. The book follows his adventures through the ages, as he takes part in the shaping of history. (Note: William Russo's 1999 novella Mal Tempo details Wallace's research and real-life attempt to find the mythical character for his novel. Russo also wrote a sequel, entitled Mal Tempo & Friends in 2001.) An American rabbi, H. M. Bien, turned the character into the "Wandering Gentile" in his novel Ben-Beor: A Tale of the Anti-Messiah; in the same year John L. McKeever wrote a novel, The Wandering Jew: A Tale of the Lost Tribes of Israel.

A humorous account of the Wandering Jew appears in chapter 54 of Mark Twain's 1869 travel book The Innocents Abroad.

==== Germany ====
The legend has been the subject of German poems by Christian Friedrich Daniel Schubart, Aloys Schreiber, Wilhelm Müller, Nikolaus Lenau, Adelbert von Chamisso, August Wilhelm von Schlegel, Julius Mosen (an epic, 1838), and Ludwig Köhler; of novels by Franz Horn (1818), Oeklers, and Levin Schücking; and of tragedies by Ernst August Friedrich Klingemann ("Ahasuerus", 1827) and Joseph Christian Freiherr von Zedlitz (1844). It is either the Ahasuerus of Klingemann or that of Achim von Arnim in his play, Halle and Jerusalem, to whom Richard Wagner refers in the final passage of his notorious essay Das Judenthum in der Musik.

There are clear echoes of the Wandering Jew in Wagner's The Flying Dutchman, whose plot line is adapted from a story by Heinrich Heine in which the Dutchman is referred to as "the Wandering Jew of the ocean", and his final opera Parsifal features a woman called Kundry who is in some ways a female version of the Wandering Jew. It is alleged that she was formerly Herodias, and she admits that she laughed at Jesus on his route to the Crucifixion, and is now condemned to wander until she meets with him again (cf. Eugene Sue's version, below).

Robert Hamerling, in his Ahasver in Rom (Vienna, 1866), identifies Nero with the Wandering Jew. Goethe had designed a poem on the subject, the plot of which he sketched in his Dichtung und Wahrheit.

==== Denmark ====
Hans Christian Andersen made his "Ahasuerus" the Angel of Doubt, and was imitated by Heller in a poem on "The Wandering of Ahasuerus", which he afterward developed into three cantos. Martin Andersen Nexø wrote a short story named "The Eternal Jew", in which he also refers to Ahasuerus as the spreading of the Jewish gene pool in Europe.

The story of the Wandering Jew is the basis of the essay "The Unhappiest One" in Søren Kierkegaard's Either/Or (published 1843 in Copenhagen). It is also discussed in an early portion of the book that focuses on Mozart's opera Don Giovanni.

In the play Genboerne (The Residents) by Jens Christian Hostrup (1844), the Wandering Jew is a character (in this context called "Jerusalem's shoemaker") and his shoes make the wearer invisible. The protagonist of the play borrows the shoes for a night and visits the house across the street as an invisible man.

==== France ====
The French writer Edgar Quinet published his prose epic on the legend in 1833, making the subject the judgment of the world; and Eugène Sue wrote his Juif errant in 1844, in which the author connects the story of Ahasuerus with that of Herodias. Grenier's 1857 poem on the subject may have been inspired by Gustave Doré's designs, which were published the preceding year. One should also note Paul Féval, père's La Fille du Juif Errant (1864), which combines several fictional Wandering Jews, both heroic and evil, and Alexandre Dumas' incomplete Isaac Laquedem (1853), a sprawling historical saga. In Guy de Maupassant's short story "Uncle Judas", the local people believe that the old man in the story is the Wandering Jew.

In the late 1830s, the epic novel "The Wandering Jew," written by Eugene Sue was published in serialized form.

==== Russia ====
In Russia, the legend of the Wandering Jew appears in an incomplete epic poem by Vasily Zhukovsky, "Ahasuerus" (1857) and in another epic poem by Wilhelm Küchelbecker, "Ahasuerus, a Poem in Fragments", written between 1832 and 1846 but not published until 1878, long after the poet's death. Alexander Pushkin also began a long poem on Ahasuerus (1826) but later abandoned the project, completing fewer than thirty lines.

==== Other literature ====
The Wandering Jew makes a notable appearance in the gothic masterpiece of the Polish writer Jan Potocki, The Manuscript Found in Saragossa, written about 1797.

Brazilian writer and poet Machado de Assis often used Jewish themes in his writings. One of his short stories, Viver! ("To Live!"), is a dialog between the Wandering Jew (named as Ahasverus) and Prometheus at the end of time. It was published in 1896 as part of the book Várias histórias (Several stories).

Castro Alves, another Brazilian poet, wrote a poem named "Ahasverus e o gênio" ("Ahasverus and the genie"), in a reference to the Wandering Jew.

The Hungarian poet János Arany also wrote a ballad called "Az örök zsidó" ("The Eternal Jew").

The Slovenian poet Anton Aškerc wrote a poem called "Ahasverjev tempelj" ("Ahasverus' Temple").

The Spanish military writer José Gómez de Arteche's novel Un soldado español de veinte siglos (A Spanish soldier of twenty centuries) (1874–1886) depicts the Wandering Jew as serving in the Spanish military of different periods.

=== 20th century ===
==== Latin America ====
In Mexican writer Mariano Azuela's 1920 novel set during the Mexican Revolution, The Underdogs (Spanish: Los de abajo), the character Venancio, a semi-educated barber, entertains the band of revolutionaries by recounting episodes from The Wandering Jew, one of two books he had read.

In Argentina, the topic of the Wandering Jew has appeared several times in the work of Enrique Anderson Imbert, particularly in his short-story El Grimorio (The Grimoire), included in the eponymous book.

Chapter XXXVII, "El Vagamundo", in the collection of short stories, Misteriosa Buenos Aires, by the Argentine writer Manuel Mujica Láinez also centres round the wandering of the Jew.

The Argentine writer Jorge Luis Borges named the main character and narrator of his short story "The Immortal" Joseph Cartaphilus (in the story he was a Roman military tribune who gained immortality after drinking from a magical river and dies in the 1920s).

In Green Mansions, W. H. Hudson's protagonist Abel references Ahasuerus, as an archetype of someone, like himself, who prays for redemption and peace, while condemned to walk the earth.

In 1967, the Wandering Jew appears as an unexplained magical realist townfolk legend in Gabriel García Márquez's One Hundred Years of Solitude. In his short story, "One Day After Saturday," the character Father Anthony Isabel claims to encounter the Wandering Jew again in the mythical town of Macondo.

Colombian writer Prospero Morales Pradilla, in his novel Los pecados de Inés de Hinojosa (The sins of Ines de Hinojosa), describes the famous Wandering Jew of Tunja that has been there since the 16th century. He talks about the wooden statue of the Wandering Jew that is in Santo Domingo church and every year during the holy week is carried around on the shoulders of the Easter penitents around the city. The main feature of the statue are his eyes; they can express the hatred and anger in front of Jesus carrying the cross.

==== Belgium ====
The Belgian writer August Vermeylen published in 1906 a novel called De wandelende Jood (The Wandering Jew).

==== Brazil ====
In 1970, Polish-Brazilian writer Samuel Rawet published "Viagens de Ahasverus à Terra Alheia em Busca de um Passado que não existe porque é Futuro e de um Futuro que já passou porque sonhado" ("Travels of Ahasverus to foreign lands in search of a past that does not exist because it is a future and a future that has already passed because it was dreamed"), a short story in which the main character, Ahasverus, or The Wandering Jew, is capable of transforming into various other figures.

==== France ====
Guillaume Apollinaire parodies the character in "Le Passant de Prague" in his collection L'Hérésiarque et Cie (Heresiarch & Co., 1910).

Jean d'Ormesson wrote Histoire du juif errant in (1991).

In Simone de Beauvoir's novel Tous les Hommes sont Mortels (All Men are Mortal, 1946), the leading figure Raymond Fosca undergoes a fate similar to the wandering Jew, who is explicitly mentioned as a reference.

==== Germany ====
In both Gustav Meyrink's The Green Face (1916) and Leo Perutz's The Marquis of Bolibar (1920), the Wandering Jew features as a central character. The German writer Stefan Heym in his novel Ahasver (translated into English as The Wandering Jew) maps a story of Ahasuerus and Lucifer ranging between ancient times, the Germany of Luther and socialist East Germany. In Heym's depiction, the Wandering Jew is a highly sympathetic character.

==== Ireland ====
Leopold Bloom, the Jewish protagonist of James Joyce's Ulysses (1922), travels throughout Dublin over the course of the novel. While the novel's title invites comparisons to Odysseus and his Odyssey, Bloom has also been understood as an example of the Wandering Jew archetype.

==== Romania ====
Mihai Eminescu, an influential Romanian Romantic writer, depicts a variation in his 1872 fantasy novella Poor Dionysus (Romanian: Sărmanul Dionis). A student named Dionis goes on a surreal journey through the book of Zoroaster, which seemingly grants him godlike abilities. The book is given to him by Ruben, his Jewish master who is a philosopher. Dionis awakens as Friar Dan, and is eventually tricked by Ruben, being sentenced by God to a life of insanity. This he can only escape by resurrection or metempsychosis.

Similarly, Mircea Eliade presents in his novel Dayan (1979) a student's mystic and fantastic journey through time and space under the guidance of the Wandering Jew, in the search of a higher truth and of his own self.

==== Russia ====
The Soviet satirists Ilya Ilf and Yevgeni Petrov had their hero Ostap Bender tell the story of the Wandering Jew's death at the hands of Ukrainian nationalists in The Little Golden Calf. In Vsevolod Ivanov's story Ahasver a strange man comes to a Soviet writer in Moscow in 1944, introduces himself as "Ahasver the cosmopolite" and claims he is Paul von Eitzen, a theologian from Hamburg, who concocted the legend of the Wandering Jew in the 16th century to become rich and famous but then turned himself into a real Ahasver against his will. The novel Overburdened with Evil (1988) by Arkady and Boris Strugatsky involves a character in modern setting who turns out to be Ahasuerus, identified at the same time in a subplot with John the Divine. In the novel Going to the Light (Идущий к свету, 1998) by Sergey Golosovsky, Ahasuerus turns out to be Apostle Paul, punished (together with Moses and Mohammed) for inventing false religion.

==== South Korea ====
The 1979 Korean novel Son of Man by Yi Mun-yol (introduced and translated into English by Brother Anthony, 2015), is framed within a detective story. It describes the character of Ahasuerus as a defender of humanity against unreasonable laws of the Jewish god, Yahweh. This leads to his confrontations with Jesus and withholding of aid to Jesus on the way to Calvary. The unpublished manuscript of the novel was written by a disillusioned theology student, Min Yoseop, who has been murdered. The text of the manuscript provides clues to solving the murder. There are strong parallels between Min Yoseop and Ahasuerus, both of whom are consumed by their philosophical ideals.

==== Sweden ====
In Pär Lagerkvist's 1956 novel The Sibyl, Ahasuerus and a woman who was once the Delphic Sibyl each tell their stories, describing how an interaction with the divine damaged their lives. Lagerkvist continued the story of Ahasuerus in Ahasverus död (The Death of Ahasuerus, 1960).

==== Ukraine ====
In Ukrainian legend, there is a character of Marko Pekelnyi (Marko of Hell, Marko the Infernal) or Marko the Accursed. This character is based on the archetype of the Wandering Jew. The origin of Marko's image is also rooted in the legend of the traitor Mark, who struck Christ with an iron glove before his death on the cross, for which God punished him by forcing him to eternally walk underground around a pillar, not stopping even for a minute; he bangs his head against a pillar from time to time, disturbs even hell and its master with these sounds and complains that he cannot die. Another explanation for Mark's curse is that he fell in love with his own sister, then killed her along with his mother, for which he was punished by God.

Ukrainian authors Oleksa Storozhenko, Lina Kostenko, Ivan Malkovych and others have written prose and poetry about Marko the Infernal. Also, Les Kurbas Theatre made a stage performance "Marko the Infernal, or the Easter Legend" based on the poetry of Vasyl Stus.

==== United Kingdom ====
Bernard Capes' story "The Accursed Cordonnier" (1900) depicts the Wandering Jew as a figure of menace.

Robert Nichols' novella "Golgotha & Co." in his collection Fantastica (1923) is a satirical tale where the Wandering Jew is a successful businessman who subverts the Second Coming.

In Evelyn Waugh's Helena, the Wandering Jew appears in a dream to the protagonist and shows her where to look for the Cross, the goal of her quest.

J. G. Ballard's short story "The Lost Leonardo", published in The Terminal Beach (1964), centres on a search for the Wandering Jew. The Wandering Jew is revealed to be Judas Ischariot, who is so obsessed with all known depictions of the crucifixion that he travels all around the world to steal them from collectors and museums, replacing them with forged duplicates. The story's first German translation, published the same year as the English original, translates the story's title as Wanderer durch Zeit und Raum ("Wanderer through Time and Space"), directly referencing the concept of the "eternally Wandering" Jew.

The horror novel Devil Daddy (1972) by John Blackburn features the Wandering Jew.

The Wandering Jew appears as a sympathetic character in Diana Wynne Jones's young adult novel The Homeward Bounders (1981). His fate is tied in with larger plot themes regarding destiny, disobedience, and punishment.

In Ian McDonald's 1991 story Fragments of an Analysis of a Case of Hysteria (originally published in Tales of the Wandering Jew, ed. Brian Stableford), the Wandering Jew first violates and traumatizes a little girl during the Edwardian era, where her violation is denied and explained away by Sigmund Freud analyzing her and coming to the erroneous conclusion that her signs of abuse are actually due to a case of hysteria or prudishness. A quarter of a century later, the Wandering Jew takes on the guise of a gentile éminence grise who works out the genocidal ideology and bureaucracy of the Holocaust and secretly incites the Germans into carrying it out according to his plans. In a meeting with one of the victims where he's gloatingly telling her that she and millions of others will die, he reveals that he did it out of self-hatred.

==== United States ====
In O. Henry's 1911 story "The Door of Unrest", a drunk shoemaker Mike O'Bader comes to a local newspaper editor and claims to be the Jerusalem shoemaker Michob Ader who did not let Christ rest upon his doorstep on the way to crucifixion and was condemned to live until the Second Coming. However, Mike O'Bader insists he is a Gentile, not a Jew.

"The Wandering Jew" is the title of a short poem by Edwin Arlington Robinson which appears in his 1920 book The Three Taverns. In the poem, the speaker encounters a mysterious figure with eyes that "remembered everything". He recognizes him from "his image when I was a child" and finds him to be bitter, with "a ringing wealth of old anathemas"; a man for whom the "world around him was a gift of anguish". The speaker does not know what became of him, but believes that "somewhere among men to-day / Those old, unyielding eyes may flash / And flinch—and look the other way."

George Sylvester Viereck and Paul Eldridge wrote a trilogy of novels My First Two Thousand Years: an Autobiography of the Wandering Jew (1928), in which Isaac Laquedem is a Roman soldier who, after being told by Jesus that he will "tarry until I return", goes on to influence many of the great events of history. He frequently encounters Solome (described as "The Wandering Jewess"), and travels with a companion, to whom he has passed on his immortality via a blood transfusion (another attempt to do this for a woman he loved ended in her death).

"Ahasver", a cult leader identified with the Wandering Jew, is a central figure in Anthony Boucher's classic mystery novel Nine Times Nine (originally published 1940 under the name H. Holmes).

Written by Isaac Asimov in October 1956, the short story "Does a Bee Care?" features a highly influential character named Kane who is stated to have spawned the legends of the Walking Jew and the Flying Dutchman in his thousands of years maturing on Earth, guiding humanity toward the creation of technology which would allow it to return to its far-distant home in another solar system. The story originally appeared in the June 1957 edition of If: Worlds of Science Fiction magazine and is collected in the anthology Buy Jupiter and Other Stories (Isaac Asimov, Doubleday Science Fiction, 1975).

A Jewish Wanderer appears in A Canticle for Leibowitz, a post-apocalyptic science fiction novel by Walter M. Miller, Jr. first published in 1960; some children are heard saying of the old man, "What Jesus raises up STAYS raised up", and introduces himself in Hebrew as Lazarus, implying that he is Lazarus of Bethany, whom Christ raised from the dead. Another possibility hinted at in the novel is that this character is also Isaac Edward Leibowitz, founder of the (fictional) Albertian Order of St. Leibowitz (and who was martyred for trying to preserve books from burning by a savage mob). The character speaks and writes in Hebrew and English, and wanders around the desert, though he has a tent on a mesa overlooking the abbey founded by Leibowitz, which is the setting for almost all the novel's action. The character appears again in three subsequent novellas which take place hundreds of years apart, and in Miller's 1997 follow-up novel, Saint Leibowitz and the Wild Horse Woman.

Ahasuerus must remain on Earth after space travel is developed in Lester del Rey's "Earthbound" (1963). The Wandering Jew also appears in Mary Elizabeth Counselman's story "A Handful of Silver" (1967). Barry Sadler has written a series of books featuring a character called Casca Rufio Longinus who is a combination of two characters from Christian folklore, Saint Longinus and the Wandering Jew. Jack L. Chalker wrote a five-book series called The Well World Saga in which it is mentioned many times that the creator of the universe, a man named Nathan Brazil, is known as the Wandering Jew. The 10th issue of DC Comics' Secret Origins (January 1987) gave The Phantom Stranger four possible origins. In one of these explanations, the Stranger confirms to a priest that he is the Wandering Jew. Angela Hunt's novel The Immortal (2000) features the Wandering Jew under the name of Asher Genzano.

Although he does not appear in Robert A. Heinlein's novel Time Enough for Love (1973), the central character, Lazarus Long, claims to have encountered the Wandering Jew at least once, possibly multiple times, over the course of his long life. According to Lazarus, he was then using the name Sandy Macdougal and was operating as a con man. He is described as having red hair and being, in Lazarus's words, a "crashing bore".

The Wandering Jew is revealed to be Judas Iscariot in George R. R. Martin's distant-future science fiction parable of Christianity, the 1979 short story "The Way of Cross and Dragon".

In the first two novels of science fiction author Dan Simmons' Hyperion Cantos (1989–1997), a central character is referred to as the Wandering Jew as he roams the galaxy in search of a cure for his daughter's illness. In his later novel Ilium (2003), a woman who is addressed as the Wandering Jew also plays a pivotal role, acting as witness and last remaining Jew during a period where all other Jewish people have been locked away.

The Wandering Jew encounters a returned Christ in Deborah Grabien's 1990 novel Plainsong.

=== 21st century ===
==== Ireland ====
Local history and legends have made reference to The Wandering Jew having haunted an abandoned watermill on the edge of Dunleer town.

==== United Kingdom ====
English writer Stephen Gallagher uses the Wandering Jew as a theme in his 2007 novel The Kingdom of Bones. The Wandering Jew is a character, a theater manager and actor, who turned away from God and toward depravity in exchange for long life and prosperity. He must find another person to take on the persona of the wanderer before his life ends or risk eternal damnation. He eventually does find a substitute in his protégé, Louise. The novel revolves around another character's quest to find her and save her from her assumed damnation.

Sarah Perry's 2018 novel Melmoth is part-inspired by the Wandering Jew and makes several references to the legend in discussing the origin of its titular character.

J. G. Ballard's short story "The Lost Leonardo" features the Wandering Jew as a mysterious art thief.

The fate of Maglor, the last surviving son of Fëanor, in J.R.R. Tolkien's The Silmarillion, has been inspired by the legend of the Wandering Jew: as Maglor is an elf and hence immortal, and banned ever returning to the Undying Lands, he is doomed to wander the Earth until Dagor Dagorath comes.

==== United States ====
- In Glen Berger's play Underneath the Lintel, the main character suspects a 113-year overdue library book was checked out and returned by the Wandering Jew.
- The Wandering Jew appears in "An Arkham Halloween" in the 30 October 2017, issue of Bewildering Stories, as a volunteer to help Miskatonic University prepare a new translation of the Necronomicon, particularly qualified because he knew the author.
- The Wandering Jew appears in Angela Hunt's inspirational novel The Immortal (2000) and is named Asher Genzano.
- Kenneth Johnson's novel The Man of Legend is a retelling of the story of the Wandering Jew, who is in fact a Roman soldier and head of Pilate's personal guard.
- In the novella The Wandering Christian by Eugene Byrne and Kim Newman an alternate history is narrated by the Wandering Jew, in which Constantine is defeated at the Battle of the Milvian Bridge.

==== Uzbekistan ====
Uzbek writer Isajon Sulton published his novel The Wandering Jew in 2011. In this novel, the Jew does not characterize a symbol of curse, but instead appears as a human being who is aware of God's presence after being cursed by him. Moreover, the novel captures the wealth of present-day wandering Jews, as generated by modern high technology and its widespread usage.

== In art ==
=== 19th century ===
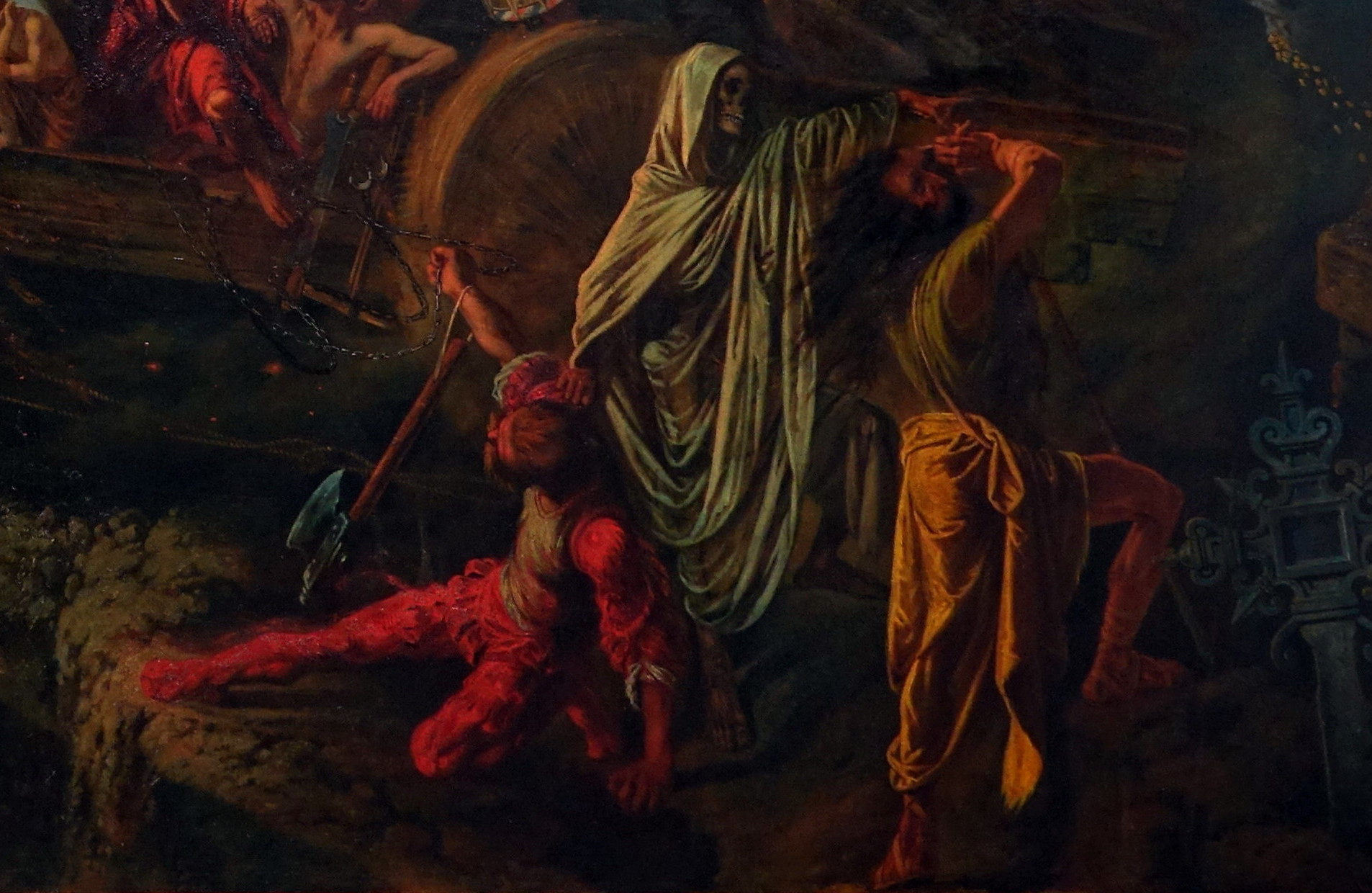
Death grabs an executioner while sending the Wandering Jew away. Detail from The Chariot of Death (1848–1851), painting by Théophile Schuler.

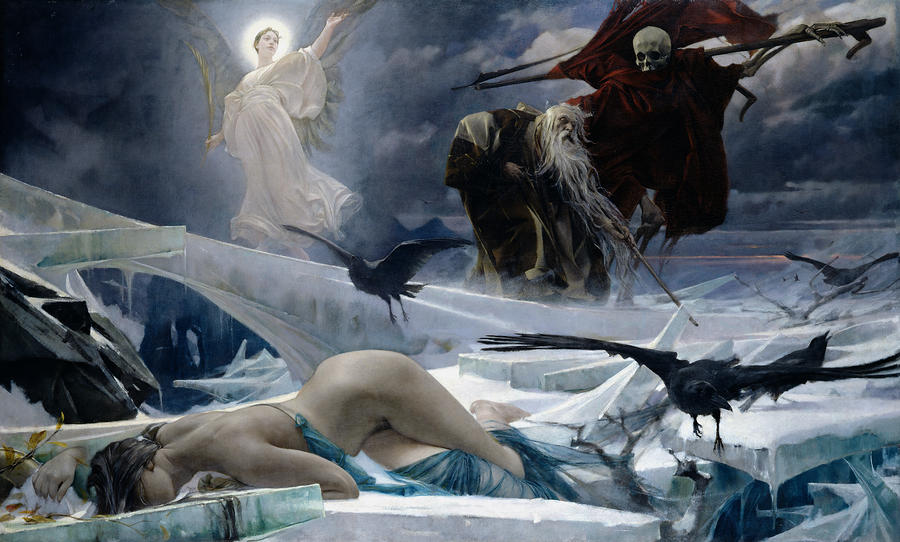
Ahasuerus at the End of the World, by Adolf Hirémy-Hirschl, 1888.

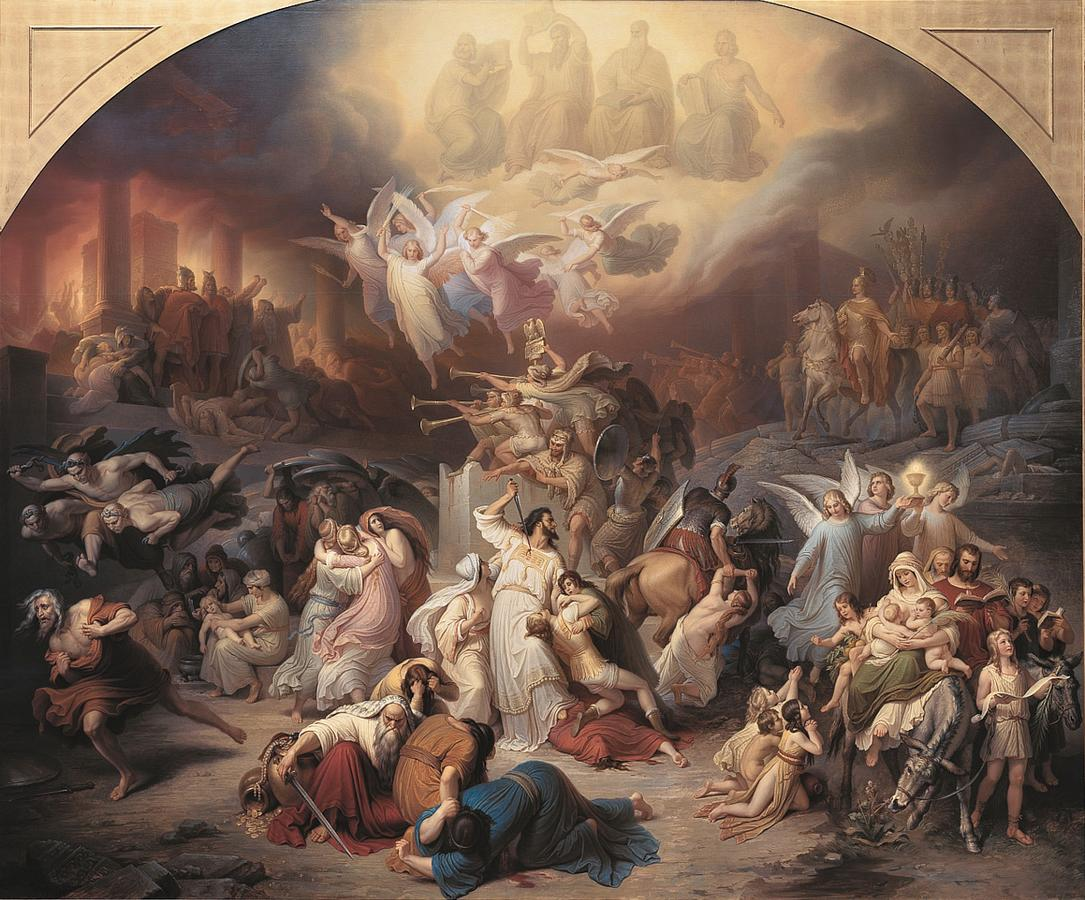
Titus destroying Jerusalem, Kaulbach.

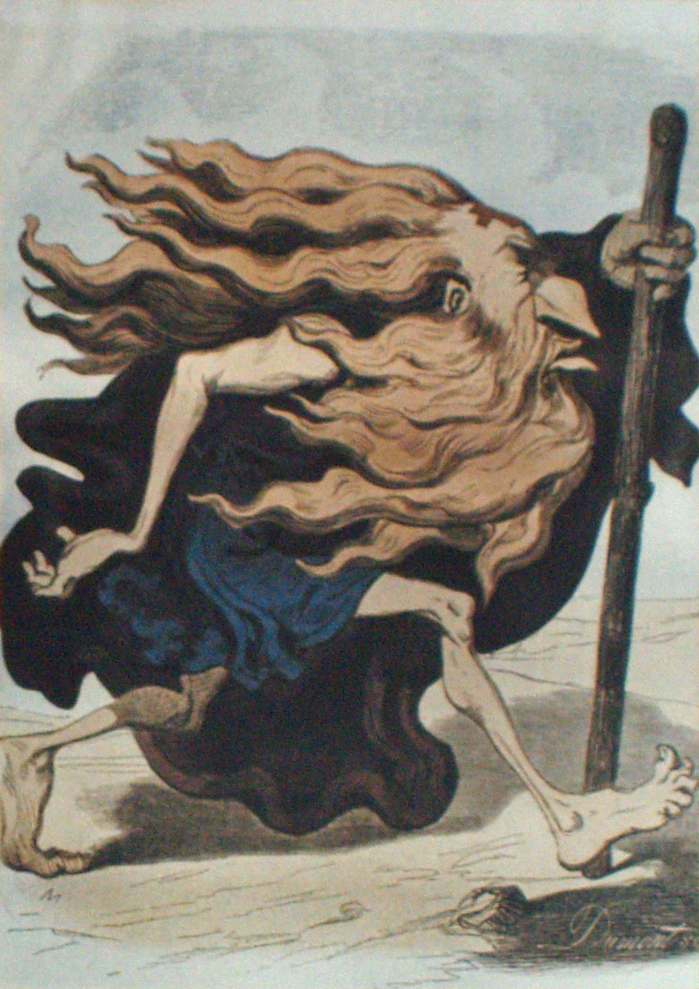
The Wandering Eternal Jew (Le Juif Eternel), coloured wood engraving by S. C. Dumont, 1852, reproduced at the Nazi exhibition Der ewige Jude in Germany and Austria 1937–1938. Reproduction exhibited at Yad Vashem

Nineteenth-century works depicting the legendary figure as the Wandering (or Eternal) Jew or as Ahasuerus (Ahasver) include:

- 1846, Wilhelm von Kaulbach, Titus destroying Jerusalem. Neue Pinakothek Munich. Commissioned from Kaulbach in 1842 and completed in 1866, it was destroyed by war damage during World War II.
  - 1836 Kaulbach's work initially commissioned by Countess Angelina Radzwill.
  - 1840 Kaulbach published a booklet of Explanations identifying the main figures. (Note: Kaulbach's booklet had quotations from Old and New Testament prophecies and references to Josephus Flavius's Jewish War as his principal literary source.)
  - 1846 finished work purchased by King Ludwig I of Bavaria for the royal collections; 1853 installed in Neue Pinakothek, Munich.
  - 1842 Kaulbach's replica for the stairway murals of the Neues Museum, Berlin commissioned by King Frederick William IV of Prussia.
  - 1866 completed.
  - 1943 destroyed by war damage. (Note: Replica for the stairway murals of the New Museum in Berlin (see fig.5 "The New Museum, Berlin"))
- 1848–1851, Théophile Schuler's monumental painting The Chariot of Death features a prominent depiction of the Wandering Jew (who is driven away by Death).
- 1852, a coloured caricature was used as a cover design for the June number of the satirical Journal pour rire, published by Charles Philipon. (Note: Attribution to Doré uncertain.)
- 1854, Gustave Courbet, The Meeting.
- 1856, Gustave Doré, twelve folio-size illustrations produced for a short poem by Pierre-Jean de Béranger, The Legend of the Wandering Jew, derived from a novel by Eugène Sue (1845)
- 1876, Maurycy Gottlieb, Ahasver. National Museum, Kraków.
- 1888, Adolf Hirémy-Hirschl, Ahasuerus at the End of the World. Private Collection.
- 1899, Samuel Hirszenberg, The Eternal Jew. Exhibited in Łódź, Warsaw and Paris in 1899, now in the Israel Museum, Jerusalem.

=== 20th century ===
In another artwork, exhibited at Basel in 1901, the legendary figure with the name Der ewige Jude, The Eternal Jew, was shown redemptively bringing the Torah back to the Promised Land.

Among the paintings of Marc Chagall having a connection with the legend, one has the explicit title Le Juif Errant (1923–1925). (Note: For works of some other artists with 'Wandering Jew' titles, and connected with the theme of the continuing social and political predicament of Jews or the Jewish people see: Brichetto (2006): figs. 24 (1968), 26 (1983), 27 (1996), 28 (2002))

In his painting The Wandering Jew (1983) Michael Sgan-Cohen depicts a man with bird's head wearing a Jewish hat, with the Hand of God pointing down from the heaven to the man. The empty chair in the foreground of the painting is a symbol of how the figure cannot settle down and is forced to keep wandering.

== In ideology (19th century and after) ==
By the beginning of the eighteenth century, the figure of the "Wandering Jew" as a legendary individual had begun to be identified with the fate of the Jewish people as a whole. After the ascendancy of Napoleon Bonaparte at the end of the century and the emancipating reforms in European countries connected with the policy of Napoleon and the Jews, the "Eternal Jew" became an increasingly "symbolic ... and universal character" as the continuing struggle for Jewish emancipation in Prussia and elsewhere in Europe in the course of the nineteenth century gave rise to what came to be referred to as "the Jewish Question".

Before Kaulbach's mural replica of his painting Titus destroying Jerusalem had been commissioned by the King of Prussia in 1842 for the projected Neues Museum, Berlin, Gabriel Riesser's essay "Stellung der Bekenner des mosaischen Glaubens in Deutschland" ("On the Position of Confessors of the Mosaic Faith in Germany") had been published in 1831 and the journal Der Jude, periodische Blätter für Religions und Gewissensfreiheit (The Jew, Periodical for Freedom of Religion and Thought) had been founded in 1832. In 1840 Kaulbach himself had published a booklet of Explanations identifying the main figures for his projected painting, including that of the Eternal Jew in flight as an outcast for having rejected Christ.

In 1843 Bruno Bauer's book The Jewish Question was published, where Bauer argued that religious allegiance must be renounced by both Jews and Christians as a precondition of juridical equality and political and social freedom. to which Karl Marx responded with an article by the title "On the Jewish Question".

A caricature which had first appeared in a French publication in 1852, depicting the legendary figure with "a red cross on his forehead, spindly legs and arms, huge nose and blowing hair, and staff in hand", was co-opted by anti-Semites. It was shown at the Nazi exhibition Der ewige Jude in Germany and Austria in 1937–1938. A reproduction of it was exhibited at Yad Vashem in 2007 (shown here).

The exhibition had been held at the Library of the German Museum in Munich from 8 November 1937 to 31 January 1938 showing works that the Nazis considered to be "degenerate art". A book containing images of these works was published under the title The Eternal Jew. It had been preceded by other such exhibitions in Mannheim, Karlsruhe, Dresden, Berlin and Vienna. The works of art displayed at these exhibitions were generally executed by avant-garde artists who had become recognized and esteemed in the 1920s, but the objective of the exhibitions was not to present the works as worthy of admiration but to deride and condemn them.

== Portrayal in popular media ==
=== Stage ===
Fromental Halévy's opera Le Juif errant, based on the novel by Sue, was premiered at the Paris Opera (Salle Le Peletier) on 23 April 1852, and had 48 further performances over two seasons. The music was sufficiently popular to generate a Wandering Jew Mazurka, a Wandering Jew Waltz, and a Wandering Jew Polka.

A Hebrew-language play titled The Eternal Jew premiered at the Moscow Habimah Theatre in 1919 and was performed at the Habima Theatre in New York in 1926.

Donald Wolfit made his debut as the Wandering Jew in a stage adaptation in London in 1924. The play Spikenard (1930) by C. E. Lawrence, has the Jew wander an uninhabited Earth along with Judas and the Impenitent thief. Glen Berger's 2001 play Underneath the Lintel is a monologue by a Dutch librarian who delves into the history of a book that is returned 113 years overdue and becomes convinced that the borrower was the Wandering Jew.

=== Books ===
Walter M. Miller Jr.'s 1959 post-apocalyptic novel A Canticle for Leibowitz features the Wandering Jew as a recurring character, most prominently in the novel’s middle third, where he appears as a hermit known as Benjamin. He also appears in the Miller's 1997 follow-up novel Saint Leibowitz and the Wild Horse Woman.

The 1964 short story ‘’The Lost Leonardo’’ by science fiction author and novelist J.G. Ballard imagines what The Wandering Jew would do with his depiction in art through the ages.

Stefan Heym's 1981 novel "Ahasver", where the Wandering Jew is an incarnation of a fallen angel Ahasver who seeks to find if humanity can be saved through revolutionary change, or whether all revolutions are doomed to repeat the previous status quo.

=== Film ===
There have been several films on the topic of The Wandering Jew:

- 1904 silent film called Le Juif Errant by Georges Méliès
- 1920, in the silent film The Golem, Rabbi Loew conjures an image of Ahasuerus, the Wandering Jew, at the emperor's court.
- 1923 saw The Wandering Jew, a British silent film by Maurice Elvey from the basis of E. Temple Thurston's play, starring Matheson Lang. The play had been produced both in Twickenham, London and on Broadway in 1921, the latter co-produced by David Belasco. The play, as well as the two films based upon it, attempts to tell the legend literally, taking the Jew from Biblical times to the Spanish Inquisition.
- Elvey also directed the sound remake The Wandering Jew (1933), with Conrad Veidt in the title role; the film was so popular it broke box office records at the time.
- In 1933, the Jewish Talking Picture Company released a Yiddish-language film entitled The Eternal Jew.
- In 1940, a propaganda pseudo-documentary film was made in Nazi Germany entitled Der ewige Jude (The Eternal Jew), reflecting Nazism's antisemitism, linking the legend with alleged Jewish malpractices over the ages.
- Another film version of the story, made in Italy in 1948, starred Vittorio Gassman.
- In 1986 film Prison Ship: Star Slammer - The Escape - Adventures of Taura, Part 1, it begins with the wandering priest Zaal, obviously appearing like the Wandering Jew who gets killed by fascist bounty hunters.
- In 1988 film The Seventh Sign the Wandering Jew appears as Father Lucci, who identifies himself as the centuries-old Cartaphilus, Pilate's porter, who took part in the scourging of Jesus before his crucifixion.
- The 1993 film Needful Things, based on the 1991 novel of the same name by Stephen King, has elements of the Wandering Jew legend.
- The 2000 horror film Dracula 2000 and its sequels equate the Wandering Jew with Judas Iscariot.
- A 2007 science fiction film The Man from Earth is similar to the Wandering Jew story in many aspects.
- The 2009 film An Education described both Graham and David Goldman this way, though Lynn Barber's original memoirs it was based on did not.

=== Television ===
- In the third episode of the first season of The Librarians, the character Jenkins mentions the Wandering Jew as an "immortal creature that can be injured, but never killed".
- In the third season of the FX series Fargo, a character named Paul Murrane (played by Ray Wise) appears to three major characters. He acts as a source of counsel to two of them (one of whom he provides a chance at redemption), while forcing the third to confront his past involvement in numerous killings. Though the character is widely believed to represent the Wandering Jew, the name is associated with a historical mistake: it is an anglicized version of Paolo Marana (Giovanni Paolo Marana allegedly authored Letters Writ by a Turkish Spy whose second volume features the Wandering Jew), rather than a known alias of the legendary figure.
- In the Japanese manga and accompanying anime series The Ancient Magus' Bride, the Wandering Jew is represented in the antagonist of Cartaphilus. In his search to end his eternal suffering, Cartaphilus serves as a nuisance to the progression of Chise's training.
- In the television series Peaky Blinders, Jewish gangster Alfie Solomons (played by Tom Hardy), described himself as "The Wandering Jew".
- In "Lagrimas", an episode of the second season of Witchblade, he is portrayed by Jeffrey Donovan as a mysterious drifter who develops a romantic relationship with protagonist Sara Pezzini. His true identity is later revealed to be the cursed Roman soldier Cartaphilus, who hopes the Witchblade can finally bring an end to his suffering.
- In the television series Rawhide the Wandering Jew features in the episode "Incident of the Wanderer" (Season 6, episode 21).
- In the television adaptation of The Sandman, in reference to a meeting of the characters Morpheus and Hob Gadling, Johanna Constantine remarks on a rumor that the Devil (Morpheus) and the Wandering Jew (Hob) meet once every hundred years in a tavern.

=== Comics ===
In Arak: Son of Thunder issue 8, the titular character encounters the Wandering Jew. Arak intervenes on behalf of a mysterious Jewish man who is about to be stoned by the people of a village. Later on, that same individual serves as a guide through the Catacombs of Rome as they seek out the lair of the Black Pope, who holds Arak's allies hostage. His name is given as Josephus and he tells Arak that he is condemned to wander the Earth after mocking Christ en route to the crucifixion.

The DC Comics character Phantom Stranger, a mysterious hero with paranormal abilities, was given four possible origins in an issue of Secret Origins with one of them identifying him as the Wandering Jew. He now dedicates his time to helping mankind, even declining a later offer from God to release him from his penance.

In Deitch's A Shroud for Waldo, serialized in weekly papers such as New York Press and released in book form by Fantagraphics, the hospital attendant who revives Waldo as a hulking demon so he can destroy the AntiChrist, is none other than the Wandering Jew. For carrying out this mission, he is awarded a normal life and, it is implied, marries the woman he just rescued. Waldo, having reverted to cartoon cat form, is also rewarded, finding it in a freight car.

In Neil Gaiman's The Sandman comic series, the character Hob Gadling represents the archetypal Wandering Jew.

In Kore Yamazaki's manga The Ancient Magus' Bride, the character Cartaphilus, also known as Joseph, is a mysterious being that looks like a young boy, but is much older. He is dubbed "The Wandering Jew" and is said to have been cursed with immortality for throwing a rock at the Son of God. It is later revealed that Joseph and Cartaphilus used to be two different people until Joseph fused with Cartaphilus in an attempt to remove his curse, only to become cursed himself.

In chapter 24 (titled "Immortality") of Katsuhisa Kigitsu's manga "Franken Fran", the main character Fran discovers a man who can't die. Once the man is allowed to write he reveals he is in fact The Wandering Jew.

In "Raqiya: The New Book of Revelation Series" by Masao Yajima and Boichi, the main character has multiple encounters with a man who is seeking to die but unable to. Initially called Mr Snow, he later reveals his identity as The Wandering Jew.

In the Wildstorm comic book universe, a man named Manny Weiss is revealed to be The Wandering Jew. He is one of a handful of sentient beings still alive billions of years in the future to witness the heat death of the universe.

== Plants ==
Various types of plants are called by the common name "wandering Jew", apparently because of these plants' ability to resist gardener's attempt to prevent them from "wandering over the earth until the second coming of Christ" (see Wandering Jew (disambiguation) § Plants). In 2016, to avoid anti-Semitism, the name "wandering dude" to describe Tradescantia has been proposed in an online plant community by Pedram Navid, instead of "Wandering Jew" and "silver inch plant".

== See also ==
Title page of Cassell, Petter & Galpin's edition of Doré's designs

- Hob Gadling
- Prester John
- Spiderwort
- Ashwatthama, a similar legend in Hinduism
- Three Nephites, a similar legend in Mormonism

== Bibliography ==
- Anderson, George K. (1965). "The Beginnings of the Legend". The legend of the Wandering Jew. Hanover, N.H. (U.S.): Brown University Press. pp. 11–37. Collects both literary versions and folk versions.
  - Anderson, George K. (1991). The legend of the Wandering Jew. Hanover, N.H. (U.S.): Brown University Press. ISBN 0-87451-547-5.
- Camilla Rockwood, ed. (2009). Brewer's Dictionary of Phrase and Fable (18th ed.). Edinburgh: Chambers Harrap. p. 1400. ISBN 9780550104113.
- Cohen, Richard I. The "Wandering Jew" from Medieval Legend to Modern Metaphor, in Barbara Kirshenblatt-Gimblett and Jonathan Karp (eds), The Art of Being Jewish in Modern Times (Philadelphia, University of Pennsylvania Press, 2007) (Jewish Culture and Contexts)
- Gaer, Joseph (Fishman) The Legend of the Wandering Jew New American Library, 1961 (Dore illustrations) popular account
- Hasan-Rokem, Galit and Alan Dundes The Wandering Jew: Essays in the Interpretation of a Christian Legend (Bloomington:Indiana University Press) 1986. 20th-century folkloristic renderings.
- Jacobs, Joseph (1911). "Jew, The Wandering" . In Chisholm, Hugh (ed.). Encyclopædia Britannica. Vol. 15 (11th ed.). Cambridge University Press. pp. 362−363.
- Manning, Robert Douglas Wandering Jew and Wandering Jewess ISBN 978-1-895507-90-4
- Sabine Baring-Gould, Curious Myths of the Middle Ages (1894)
