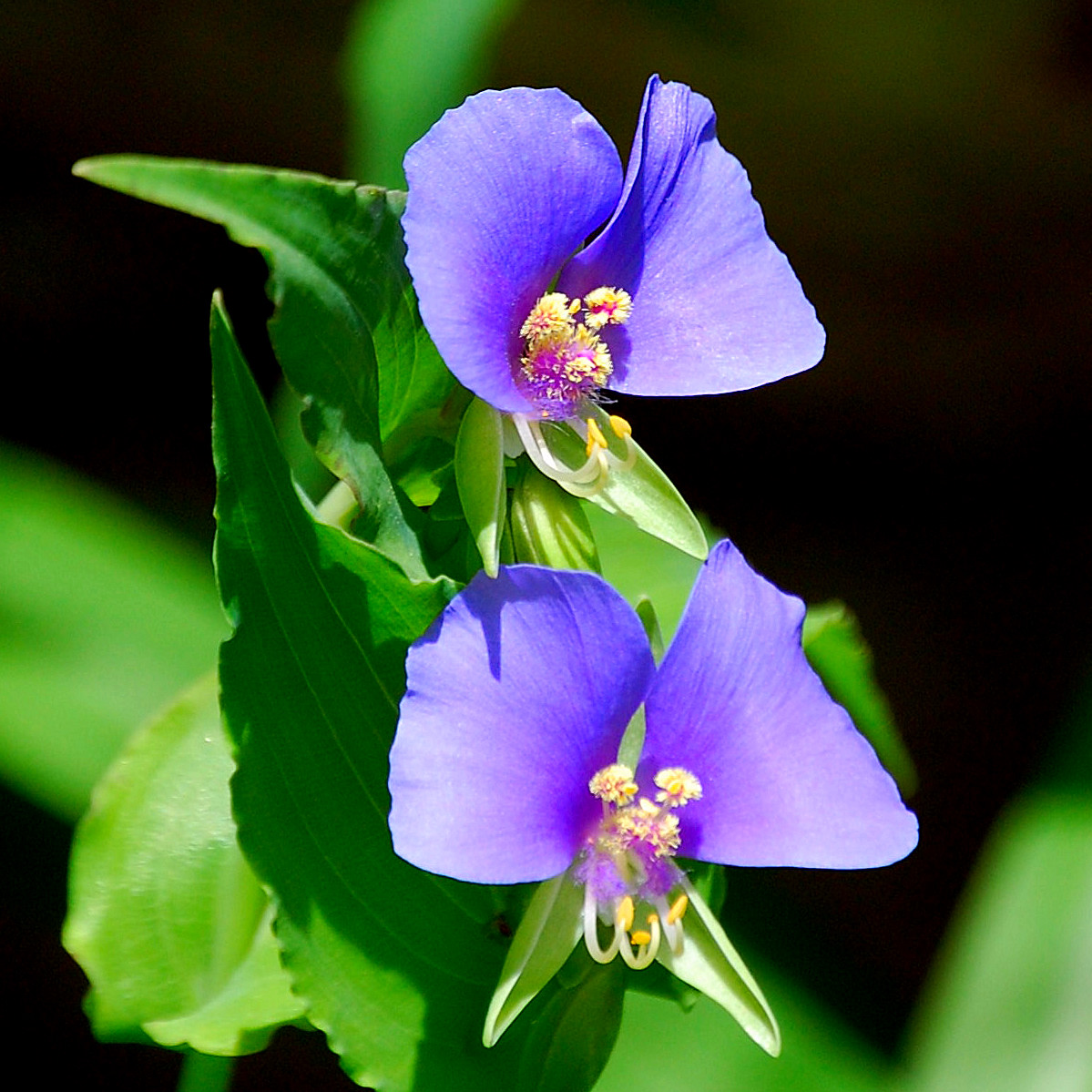
- Tinantia anomala along the Barton Creek Greenbelt in Austin, Texas

Scientific classification
- Kingdom: Plantae
- Clade: Tracheophytes
- Clade: Angiosperms
- Clade: Monocots
- Clade: Commelinids
- Order: Commelinales
- Family: Commelinaceae
- Subfamily: Commelinoideae
- Tribe: Tradescantieae
- Subtribe: Thyrsanthemineae
- Genus: Tinantia; Scheidw.

Type species
- Tinantia erecta (Jacq.) Schltdl.

Synonyms
- Pogomesia Raf.; Commelinantia Tharp

= Tinantia =

Genus of flowering plants

Tinantia is a genus of plants in the Commelinaceae, first described in 1839. They are commonly called widow's tears or false dayflowers due to their resemblance of the closely related true dayflowers of the genus Commelina. Tinantia is native to North and South America from Texas + Hispaniola to Argentina, with a center of diversity from Mexico to Nicaragua. Tinantia pringlei, an alpine native of Mexico, is grown as an ornamental in temperate areas and is also a common greenhouse weed.

The genus was named in honour of François Tinant, a Luxembourger forester.

Species

- Tinantia anomala (Torr.) C.B.Clarke - Texas, Durango
- Tinantia caribaea Urb. - Lesser Antilles, Trinidad & Tobago, Colombia
- Tinantia erecta (Jacq.) Fenzl - widespread from central Mexico to Argentina; naturalized in Azores, Madeira, Java, Angola, northern India
- Tinantia glabra (Standl. & Steyerm.) Rohweder - southern Mexico, Costa Rica, El Salvador, Guatemala, Venezuela
- Tinantia leiocalyx C.B.Clarke ex J.D.Sm. - central + southern Mexico, Central America, Colombia, Venezuela
- Tinantia longipedunculata Standl. & Steyerm. - central + southern Mexico, Central America
- Tinantia macrophylla S.Wats. - Chihuahua, Sonora, Sinaloa, Durango, Jalisco
- Tinantia parviflora Rohweder - central + southern Mexico, Central America, Colombia
- Tinantia pringlei (S.Watson) Rohweder - Tamaulipas, Nuevo León
- Tinantia sprucei C.B.Clarke - Trinidad & Tobago, Venezuela, Brazil
- Tinantia standleyi Steyerm. - central + southern Mexico, Central America, Colombia, Ecuador, Peru, southern Brazil
- Tinantia umbellata (Vahl) Urb. - Guyana, Venezuela
- Tinantia violacea Rohweder - southern Mexico, Central America
