= Adolf Hirémy-Hirschl =

Hungarian-Jewish artist

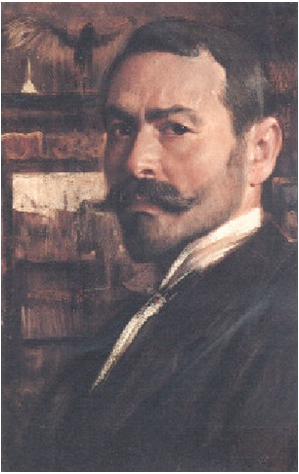
Self-portrait

Adolf Hirémy-Hirschl (1860–1933) was a Hungarian artist known for historical and mythological painting, particularly of subjects pertaining to ancient Rome. Some of his major history paintings have been lost, and many of his smaller works were retained by his heirs until the early 1980s. Although he was one of the most successful artists of fin-de-siècle Vienna, these circumstances, along with the rise of Gustav Klimt and the Vienna Secessionists, put his reputation in eclipse.

== Education and career ==
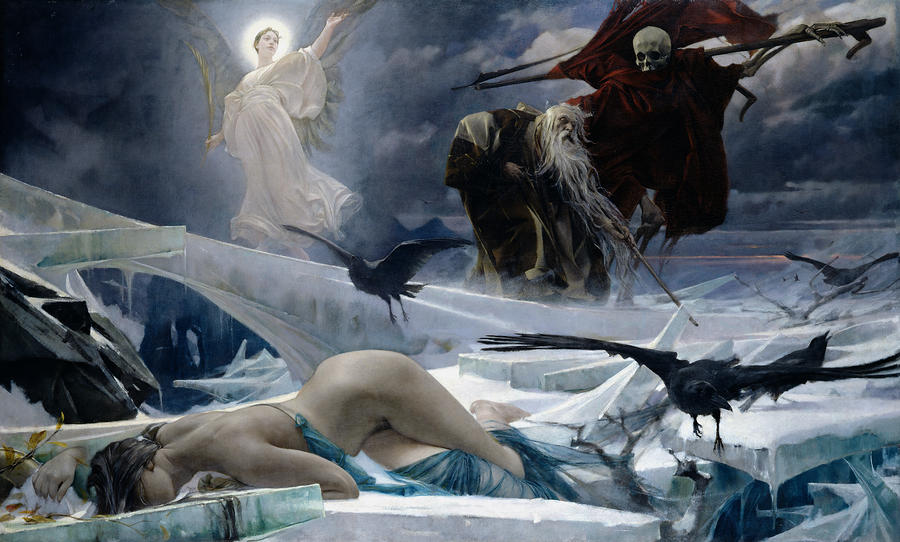
Ahasuerus at the End of the World, 1888 (referring to the myth of the Wandering Jew)

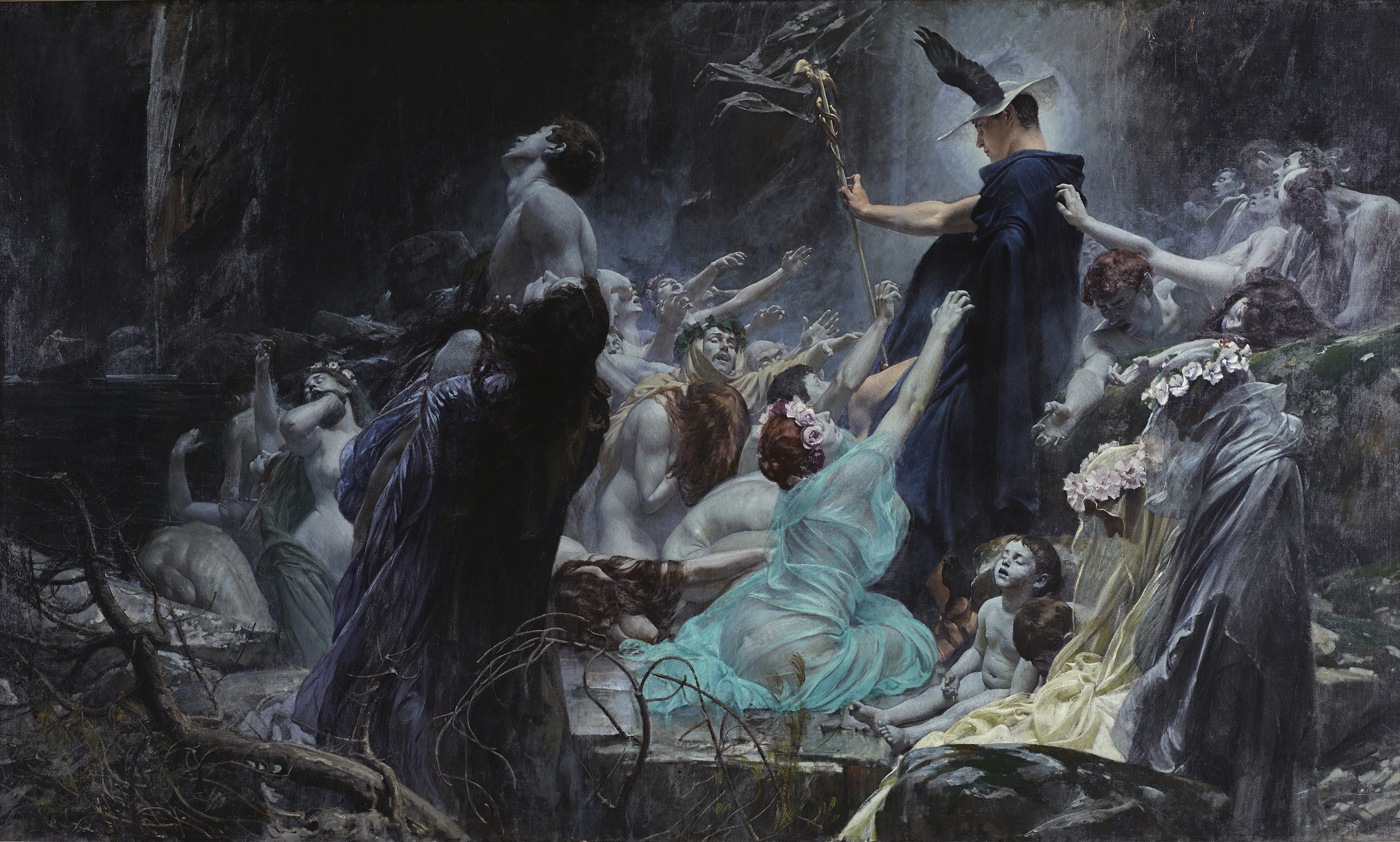
The Souls of Acheron (1898), from the Österreichische Galerie Belvedere

Hirémy-Hirschl was born 31 January 1860 to a Jewish family in Temesvár, then a part of Hungary. At an early age he went to Vienna to study. He received a scholarship to attend the Akademie der bildenden Künste in 1878. He won his first prize two years later with Farewell: Scene from Hannibal Crossing the Alps, followed in 1882 by a prize that allowed him to travel to Rome.

His time in Rome was a major influence on his choice of subject matter. After returning to Vienna, he produced the acclaimed large-scale canvas The Plague in Rome (1884), a work that is now lost. He enjoyed a successful career with numerous commissions and high praise for his historical and allegorical works, culminating in the Imperial Prize in 1891. During the rise of Klimt and the Vienna Secession movement, he began using the name Adolf Hirémy and moved to Rome, where he spent the last 35 years of his life as an eminent member of the expatriate art community. In 1904, seventy of his works were exhibited at a retrospective. He was admitted to the Accademia di San Luca in 1911.

One of his last works was Sic Transit … (1912), an immense allegorical polyptych on the fall of the Roman Empire and the rise of Christianity. His heirs retained possession of his studio for decades following his death. A large number of his drawings, watercolors, pastels, and oil sketches became public only in the early 1980s.

He died in Rome on 7 April in 1933 and was buried in the Protestant Cemetery, Rome. Gravestone: S647 TOMB NUMBER - 393, Zone 1, Row 15, Plot 54.

== As an artist ==
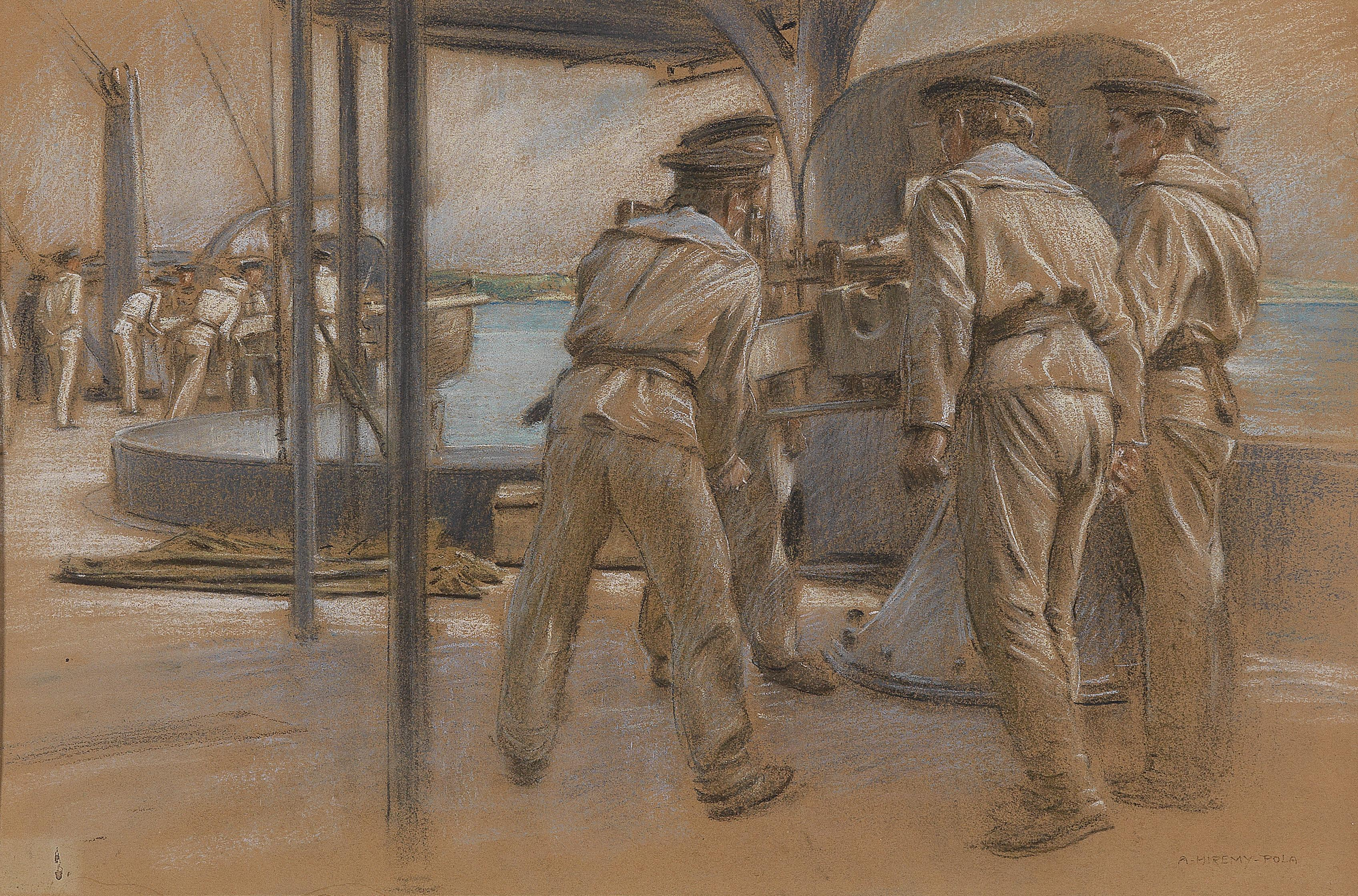
Sailors in the Harbor of Pola, pastel on paper, c. 1916

Hirémy-Hirschl is regarded as an accomplished draughtsman. His numerous figure and drapery studies in charcoal or chalk were mostly intended to be preparatory studies for paintings. His studies for Souls on the Banks of the Acheron and Sic Transit … were often executed on blue, lavender, or orange paper that enhanced the play of light in relation to the forms he drew. His female nudes are known for their "directness and overt sexuality". He also produced landscape studies in pastel, watercolor and gouache. Fragmentation is characteristic of his drawings, "the sustained attempt to perfect the single part" which at the same time represented a "means of escape from completion and synthesis".

Some of his paintings are considered Symbolist. Ahasuerus at the End of the World (1888) is executed in a restricted palette of blue, gray, black, white, with touches of gold and lingering warmth in the flesh of the foregrounded female nude. The title figure "is the last man in the polar wilderness, caught between the angel of hope and the specter of death. Before him lies a fallen female figure, the personification of dead humanity, as crows circle ominously. … The primary light appears to radiate from the distant angel, who hovers before a stormy sky."

== Works ==
Paintings by Hirémy-Hirschl include:

- Farewell: Scene from Hannibal Crossing the Alps (1880)
- The Plague of Rome (1884, lost)
- Saint Cecilia
- Prometheus
- The Vandals Entering Rome
- Ahasuerus at the End of the World (1888)
- Souls on the Banks of the Acheron (1898)
- The Tomb of Achilles
- Sic Transit … (1912)
- Between Scylla and Charybdis (1910)
