= The Wandering Jew's Chronicle =

Song

- Genre: Broadside ballad
- Meter: Ballad Meter
- Published: 17th Century: England

The Wandering Jew's Chronicle is an English broadside ballad dating back to the 17th century, with The Wandering Jew as its narrator. From the point of view of the titular character, this ballad tells the history of the English monarchs, beginning with William the Conqueror, and continuing through King Charles II in early versions, and King George II in later versions. The ballad, according to Giles Bergel, dates back to an initial publication of 1634. Copies of the ballad can be found at the British Library and Magdalene College. Online facsimiles of the text are also available for public consumption.

== Synopsis ==
The ballad, often printed with woodcut illustrations of all the monarchs named, begins with the narrator, the Wandering Jew, declaring that he was fifteen years old when William the Conqueror came to England, and that he can recall and recount with accuracy all that has happened since. He goes on to spend one stanza (sometimes less, sometimes more) telling the story of each subsequent English monarch until the time from which he is narrating. In the case of a few monarchs (Edward I, Henry VII, and Henry VIII, for example) he indicates a more personal knowledge, claiming either to have served in their armies, or as their servants at court. In addition to the monarchs, he names several other figures important to Medieval and Early Modern British monarchical history (see below for examples). The ballad is written in a variation of traditional Ballad Meter, alternating couplets of Iambic tetrameter with single lines of Iambic trimeter, resulting in six-line stanzas with an A-A-B-C-C-B rhyme scheme.

=== Differences between earlier and later versions of the text ===
- Earlier versions (dated to the last quarter of the 17th century) ends with the restoration of King Charles II, and a final stanza mentioning Catherine of Braganza, Charles' wife, and offering a blessing of peace and fecundity to them. Later versions, on the other hand (dated to the mid-18th century), eliminates the stanza mentioning Catherine, and continues through the line of English succession up to King George II and his wife, Caroline of Ansbach, concluding with a prayer for the duration of George's rule.
- Earlier versions of the ballad are headed with a list (often illustrated) of all the monarchs cataloged. Later versions contain the same list (and illustrations), but the list on these versions also contains the coronation date and length of rule of each monarch.
- Earlier versions of the ballad have an alternate title, composed of nine rhyming lines of iambic trimeter. Later versions have a shorter, prose alternate title.
- Earlier versions of the ballad describe it as being sung to the title of "Our Prince is welcome out of Spain," another ballad. However, later versions attribute to the song the tune of "The Wandering Jew's Chronicle," suggesting some degree of the ballad's popularity.

=== Kings and Queens Listed in the Ballad ===
- William the Conqueror
- William II
- Henry I
- Stephen
- Henry II
- Eleanor of Aquitaine
- Richard I
- John
- Henry III
- Edward I
- Edward II, referred to as Carnarven
- Edward III
- Richard II
- Henry IV
- Henry V
- Henry VI
- Edward IV
- Richard III
- Henry VII
- Henry VIII
- Edward VI
- Mary I
- Elizabeth I
- James I
- Charles I
- Henrietta Maria, referred to as Mary
- Charles II
- Catherine of Braganza (earlier versions only)
- James II (later versions only)
- William III (later versions only)
- Mary II (later versions only)
- Anne (later versions only)
- George I (later versions only)
- George II (later versions only)
- Caroline of Ansbach (later versions only)

=== Other Important Figures Named ===
- Simon de Montfort, 6th Earl of Leicester
- Roger Mortimer, 1st Earl of March
- Edward the Black Prince
- Wat Tyler
- Jack Straw
- Henry Percy (Hotspur)
- Jane Shore
