= Deborah Grabien =

American novelist

- Born: June 28, 1954 (age 72)
- Occupation: Author; editor; essayist; musician
- Citizenship: United States
- Genres: Murder Mysteries, Supernatural Thrillers, others

Website
- www.deborahgrabien.com

Deborah Grabien (born June 28, 1954) is an American novelist and essayist. Her works cross several genres, including murder mysteries, supernatural thrillers, utopian fantasies, etc. Her novel Plainsong is a religious fantasy featuring the Wandering Jew and a female Messiah. Grabien is currently a reviewer and guest editor for Green Man Review.

== Personal life ==
She was diagnosed with multiple sclerosis in 2002. She has used her own experiences in dealing with the disease to illuminate character traits in her characters; particularly J.P. Kinkaid, the protagonist in the Kinkaid Chronicles mystery series.

== Works ==
=== Supernatural thrillers ===
- Still Life With Devils (2007)
- Woman of Fire (1988/UK)
  - also released as Eyes in the Fire (1989/US)

=== Mysteries ===
- The Kinkaid Chronicles
  - Rock and Roll Never Forgets (2008)
  - While My Guitar Gently Weeps (2009)
  - London Calling (2010)
  - Graceland (2011)
  - Book of Days (2011)
  - Uncle John's Band (2012)
  - Dead Flowers (2012)
  - Comfortably Numb (2013)
- The Haunted Ballads
  - The Weaver and the Factory Maid (2003)
  - Famous Flower of Serving Men (2004)
  - Matty Groves (2005)
  - Cruel Sister (2006)
  - New Slain Knight (2007)

=== Historical romance ===
- Fire Queen (1990)

=== Utopian fantasy ===
- Plainsong (1990)

=== Young adult ===
- Dark's Tale (2010)
  - also released as Dark e i fantasmi del parco (2010/Italy)

=== Magic realism ===
- And Then Put Out the Light (1993/UK, 2009/US)

=== Anthologies ===
- Tales From the House Band (editor; 2011)

=== Short stories, essays and reviews ===
- Chuck Leavell: Back To The Woods: A tribute to the pioneers of blues piano (2012; appeared on Sleeping Hedgehog)
- The Thing About Movements… (2011; appeared on Harlot's Sauce)
- Goodnight, dazzling stranger (2011; appeared on Sleeping Hedgehog)
- The Rolling Stones Rock and Roll Circus (2011; appeared on Sleeping Hedgehog)
- Nicky Hopkins (2011; appeared on Sleeping Hedgehog)
- Ladies and Gentlemen: the Rolling Stones (2010; appeared on Sleeping Hedgehog)
- Rolling Stones: Exile on Main Street (2010; appeared on Sleeping Hedgehog)
- Ronnie Penque: Only Road Home (2010; appeared on Sleeping Hedgehog)
- Comfort and the Unexpected: In Conversation with Maddy Prior (2010; appeared on Green Man Review)
- An Unkindness of Authors (conversation with Peter S. Beagle, August 2008; appeared on Green Man Review)
- Ghost, in the Key of B (2008; appeared on Membra Disjecta)
- Dear Richard, Please Will You Play...? Three shows, three settings, one happy woman (2008; appeared on Green Man Review)
- Truth, in the Middle (2008; appeared in For Keeps)
- The Boys in the Barroom (2008; appeared on Green Man Review)
- Sunrise (2008; appeared on Membra Disjecta)
- Love and Crit and the Whole Damned Thing—Finding the Fulcrum point between heart and head (2008; appeared on Green Man Review)
- Talkin' About that Unbroken Circle—Deborah Grabien on Music in 2007 (2008; appeared on Green Man Review)
- Edge (2005; appeared in Dogtown Review, Issue One)
- I Am the Lion (2002; appeared in The Best Of Parisalon4665 Anthology))
