= Ahasuerus at the End of the World =

1888 oil painting by Adolf Hirémy-Hirschl

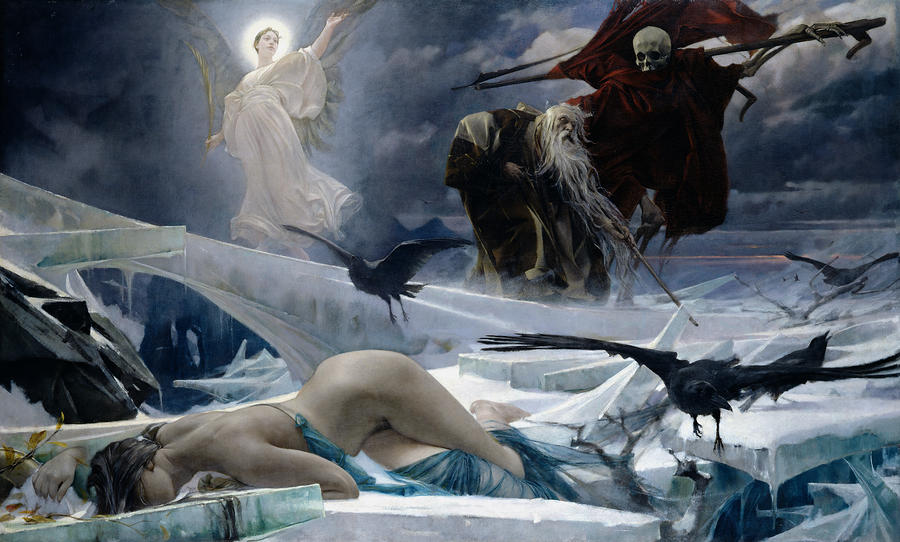
- Artist: Adolf Hirémy-Hirschl
- Year: 1888
- Medium: Oil on canvas

Ahasuerus at the End of the World is a late 19th-century oil painting by Hungarian artist Adolf Hirémy-Hirschl. Done in oil on canvas, the work depicts the Wandering Jew, called "Ahasuerus" in legends since at least the 17th century, witnessing the end of the world, as he was cursed to do for laughing at Christ during his crucifixion. The exceedingly dark symbolism used in the work has been used to cite Hirschl as a Symbolist.
