= The Eternal Jew (play) =

- Original language: Yiddish
- Written by: David Pinski
- Subject: a messianic tragedy
- Genre: Drama
- Setting: Judea at the time of the Fall of the Second Temple

Premiere
- Date: 1906
- Official website

Der Eibiger Yied (Yiddish: דער אייביגער איד; The Eternal Jew, 1906) is a one-act play written by David Pinski. It was the first play ever performed in 1919 by the Habima Theater in Moscow. It is now a part of the repertory of the Habima Theater, the national theater of Israel.

== Plot ==
The play is a messianic tragedy set at the time of the destruction of the Second Temple. The setting is Birath Arba, a town which is a few days' journey from Jerusalem. The time is shortly after the siege of Jerusalem by the Romans. Amidst rumors that Jerusalem has fallen to the Romans, a stranger arrives telling a strange story of his quest to find a child that was born in the same hour that temple fell because this child is destined to be the Messiah. The elders of the town refuse to believe his story; in fact, they are not even willing to believe that Jerusalem has really been taken by the Romans. The stranger is almost stoned to death by the town's inhabitants but he manages to escape. At this point, a young woman arrives and states that she has fled from the destruction and massacre in Jerusalem. Other messengers arrive with reports of others who are also fleeing the Romans. The woman laments that her newborn child is accursed because he was born at the same hour that the temple was destroyed. The elders of the town are now convinced of the stranger's tale and his quest to find the child. Tragically, at this very moment, a servant cries out that the child has vanished in a whirlwind. As the people of the town express their astonishment at these events, the stranger departs to continue his search for the Messiah.

== Notable productions ==
Although the play was originally written in Yiddish, it was translated into Hebrew for its 1919 production by the Habima Theater in Moscow.
