= Giovanni Paolo Marana =

Italian writer and politician

- Born: 1642; Genoa, Republic of Genoa
- Died: 1693 (aged 50–51); Northern Italy, probably Genoa
- Other name: Jean-Paul Marana
- Notable work: Letters Writ by a Turkish Spy

Giovanni Paolo Marana or sometimes Jean-Paul Marana (1642 – 1693) was a Genoese writer of both fiction and non-fiction, best remembered for his conviction for failing to reveal a conspiracy to cede the Genoese town of Savona to the Duchy of Savoy.

== Biography ==
Marana was born in Genoa to a wealthy family. In 1672, Carlo Emanuele II, Duke of Savoy, sought to expand his domains by occupying the town of Savona. For this purpose, he enlisted Raffaele Della Torre, a condottiere (a mercenary military leader), who hired men of doubtful reputation to betray the town from within. Marana apparently knew of the plot, but failed to inform the authorities, causing his imprisonment for four years. In prison, he worked on the translation of the complete works of Seneca, as well as an encoded system of writing.

Once released, he moved to France, where he was pensioned by King Louis XIV, an ally of Savoy. He returned to Italy in 1689. He published in 1682 a chronicle of the Congiura de Rafaello della Torre.

== Letters Writ by a Turkish Spy ==
Marana is the author of Letters Writ by a Turkish Spy, an epistolary novel that judges the history and manners of Europe, especially of France, of his time from an Oriental perspective. This book was published in Italian in 1684 and in French in 1686. They were translated by William Bradshaw (writer) into English in 1687 under the supervision of Robert Midgley.

The French writer and philosopher Montesquieu also drew on this book in his Persian Letters, an epistolary novel published in 1721 criticising the existing absolute monarchy in France in his own time.

== Works ==
- Letters Writ by a Turkish Spy
- La Congiura di Raffaello della Torre con le mosse della Savoia contro la Republica di Genova, In Lione : Alla spese dell'auctore, 1682. OCLC 320756854 (in Italian)
- Lettre d'un Sicilien à un de ses amis (Letter of a Sicilian to one of his friends), Paris, A. Quantin, 1883. OCLC 20872384 - Read online (in French)
- L'espion du Grand-Seigneur, et ses relations secrètes envoyées au divan de Constantinople, et découvertes à Paris, pendant le règne de Louis le Grand: contenant les événements les plus considérables arrivés pendant la vie de Louis le Grand, Amsterdam: H. Wetstein and H. Des Bordes, 1684. OCLC 69044670 (in French)
- Dialogo fra Genova, et Algieri, città fulminate dal Giove Gallico, Amsterdamo : Desbordes, 1685. OCLC 257937505 - Read online (in Italian)
- Dialogue De Genes et d'Algers Villes foudroyées, Par les Armes Invincibles de Louis Le Grand L'Année 1684 : Avec plusieurs particularitez historiques touchant le juste ressentiment de ce Monarque, et ses prétensions sur la Ville de Genes, avec les réponces des Genois, Amsterdam: Desbordes, 1685. OCLC 258639502 (the previous book in French)

== Notes and references ==
- French Wikipedia page for Giovanni Paolo Marana

== Bibliography ==
- Isabelle Billaud and Marie-Catherine Laperrière, Représentations du corps sous l'Ancien Régime: discours et pratiques, Presses Université Laval, 2007. ISBN 9782763785264
- Giovanni Paolo Marana, Rosalind Ballaster, Fables of the East: selected tales, 1662-1785, Oxford University Press, 2005. ISBN 9780199267354
- Roland Mortier et Hervé Hasquin, Etudes sur le XVIIIe siècle, Editions de l'Université de Bruxelles, 1974. ISBN 9782800407685, p. 27 ss.
- Gian Carlo Roscioni, Sulle tracce dell'esploratore turco, Milano, Rizzoli, 1992 ISBN 88-17-33748-X
