= The Wandering Jew (ballad) =

English broadside ballad

Song
- Written: late 17th century
- Genre: Broadside ballad

The Wandering Jew is an English broadside ballad dating back to the late 17th century. The ballad, subtitled "The Shoemaker of JERUSALEM. Who lived Jesus Christ was Crucified, and by him appointed to Wander till his Coming Again," tells the story of the legendary figure of the Wandering Jew, his interaction with Jesus Christ, and his subsequent eternal wanderings. Variations in the text reveal a stronger sense of antisemitism in the ballad.

== Synopsis ==
The ballad, accompanied by a two variant woodcut illustrations of male figures, begins in Jerusalem on the day of the Crucifixion of Jesus. Exhausted on his way to the crucifixion, Christ tries to stop and rest at a particular stone, but a "churl" pushes him away from his attempted rest, mocking him as King of the Jews, and pointing him towards the site of his execution. Before continuing on, Christ curses the man, telling him, "I sure will rest, but thou shalt walk, And have no journey staid." Immediately following Christ's death, the man leaves his wife and children and becomes the Wandering Jew of the title (and of legend). The Wandering Jew, the ballad tells us, is unable to find rest or solace anywhere, and perpetually wanders the world. At one point, desiring to see his home once more, he returns to Jerusalem. Dismayed to find it destroyed (presumably, in the author's opinion, by the Roman and Arab possession of the city), he hears Christ's curse upon him confirmed. He continues his wanderings, proselytizing, and converting pagans to Christianity. The Wandering Jew, says the ballad, looks neither old nor young, but just as he did on the day of the crucifixion, and will not be granted by God the rest of death. He has traveled to "Arabia, Africa, Grecia (Greece), Syria, and Great Thrace, and through all Hungaria." In all of these places, he, like the apostles Paul and Peter, shares Christ's words. He is, of the time of the composition of the ballad, said to be in Germany or Flanders, where he is said to converse with scholars, telling them his story. The ballad goes on to tell that the Wandering Jew will accept no more charity than a groat at a time, and even those he donates to the poor. The ballad concludes by telling us that the Wandering Jew continues to live his days in solemnity and guilt, castigating blasphemers and swearers, and constantly wandering.

The third and sixth stanzas of the ballad are a repeating refrain, urging the citizens of England to repent, and to be cautioned by the example of the Wandering Jew, and not refuse God's grace.

== Meter and Music ==
The ballad is written in standard ballad meter, and is set to the tune of "The Lady's Fall," a tune also known as "In Peascod Time."

== Antisemitism ==
The antisemitism of the ballad is apparent in the ballad's very subject matter, as the Wandering Jew is a legendary figure often meant, in Medieval and Early Modern occurrences, to represent the incurable wickedness of the Jews. The fact that the title character is continually considered to be a Jew, despite his apparent acceptance of Christ as savior also seems to suggest a degree of anti-semitism, as the character, despite holding and espousing beliefs that are more in line with Christianity than with mainstream Judaism, can never be separated from his identity as a "Jew." Two small variations in the text contribute to even greater degrees of Anti-Semitism:

- In some versions of the text, the refrain cautions readers, "Do not (like this wicked Jew) despise God's proffered grace." Other versions, however, broaden this warning, and, in the same line, warn readers, "Do not like the wicked Jews despite God's proffered grace." This change from the particular example of the Wandering Jew to the Jewish population as a whole as an example of how not to behave increases the ballad's anti-semitism.
- Some versions of the ballad describe the wanderings of the title character as beginning after he has seen Christ's blood shed, and his body nailed to the cross; other versions, however, assert that the Wandering Jew himself both shed Christ's blood and nailed his body to the cross. These changes reflect the anti-semitic belief that the Jews were the perpetrators of the crucifixion.
