= William Bradshaw (writer) =

British hack writer

William Bradshaw (fl. 1700) was a British hack writer.

Bradshaw was originally educated for the church. The eccentric bookseller John Dunton, from whom our only knowledge of him is derived, has left a flattering account of his abilities. Dunton wrote "His genius was quite above the common order, and his style was incomparably fine. … He wrote for me the parable of the magpies, and many thousands of them sold".

Bradshaw lived in poverty and debt, and under the additional burden of a melancholy temperament. Dunton's last experience of him was in connection with a literary project for which he furnished certain material equipments; possessed of these, Bradshaw disappeared. The passage in which Dunton records this transaction has all his characteristic naïveté, though it may be doubted whether, if Bradshaw lived to read it, he derived much satisfaction from the plenary dispensation which was granted him — "If Mr. Bradshaw be yet alive, I here declare to the world and to him that I freely forgive him what he owes both in money and books if he will only be so kind as to make me a visit". Dunton believed Bradshaw to be the author of the Letters Writ by a Turkish Spy , but this conjecture is negatived by counter claims supported on better authority.
