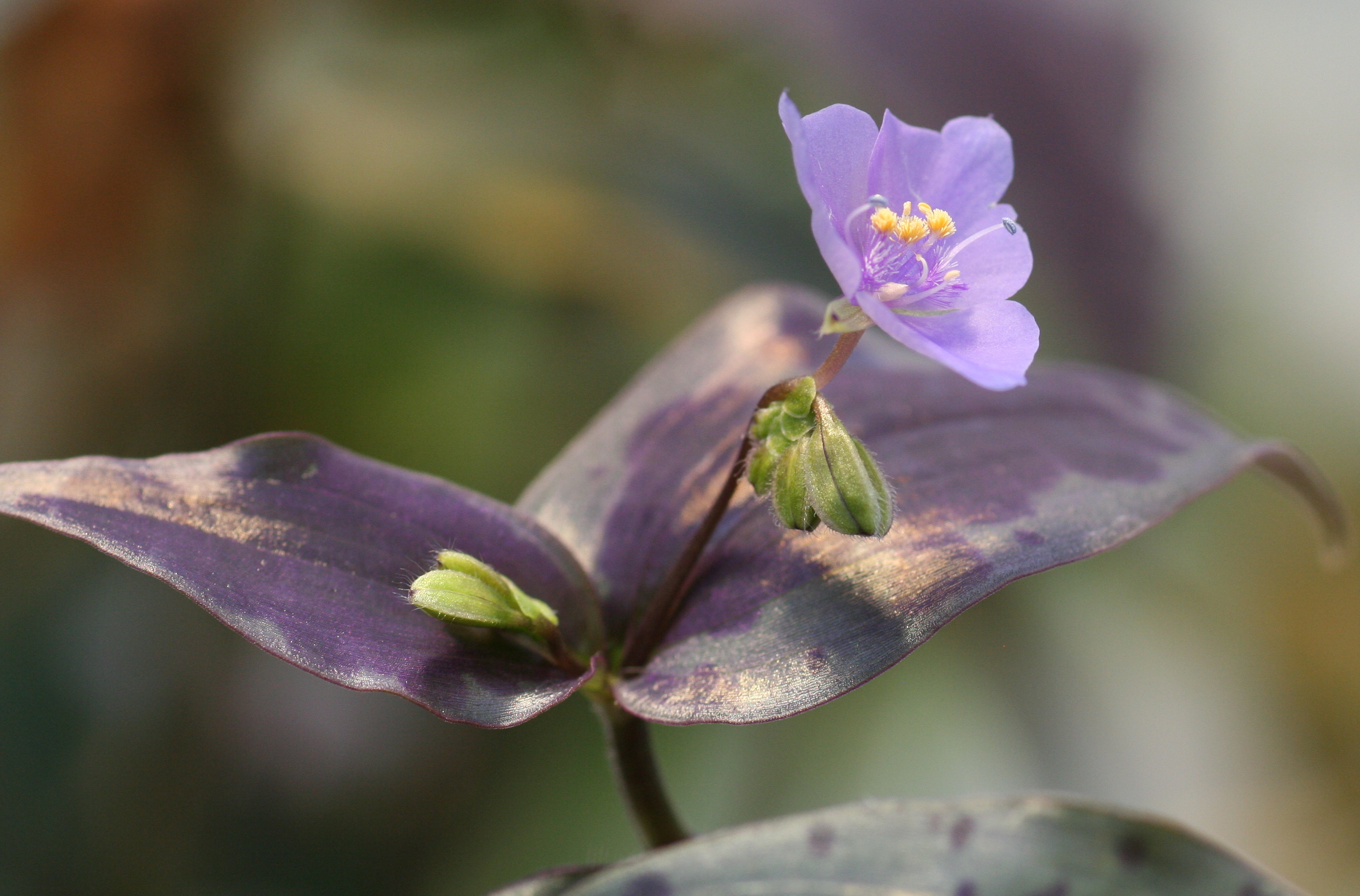
- Tinantia pringlei propagated from a collection from Sierra Chiquita Mountain in Mexico at 1150 meters in altitude

Scientific classification
- Kingdom: Plantae
- Clade: Tracheophytes
- Clade: Angiosperms
- Clade: Monocots
- Clade: Commelinids
- Order: Commelinales
- Family: Commelinaceae
- Genus: Tinantia
- Species: T. pringlei

Binomial name
- Tinantia pringlei (S. Watson) Rohweder

Synonyms
- Tradescantia pringlei S.Watson; Commelinantia pringlei (S.Watson) Tharp

= Tinantia pringlei =

Species of flowering plant

Tinantia pringlei, sometimes known as the Mexican inchplant or spotted widow's tears, is a perennial alpine plant in the dayflower family native to northeastern Mexico. The species is grown as an ornamental plant in temperate areas for its attractive spotted purple foliage and lavender flowers. It is also a common weed of greenhouses. The plants reproduce primarily or exclusively through self-pollination.
