= Letters Writ by a Turkish Spy =

Letters Writ by a Turkish Spy (French: L'Espion Turc) is an eight-volume collection of fictional letters claiming to have been written by an Ottoman spy named "Mahmut", in the French court of Louis XIV.

== Authorship and publication ==
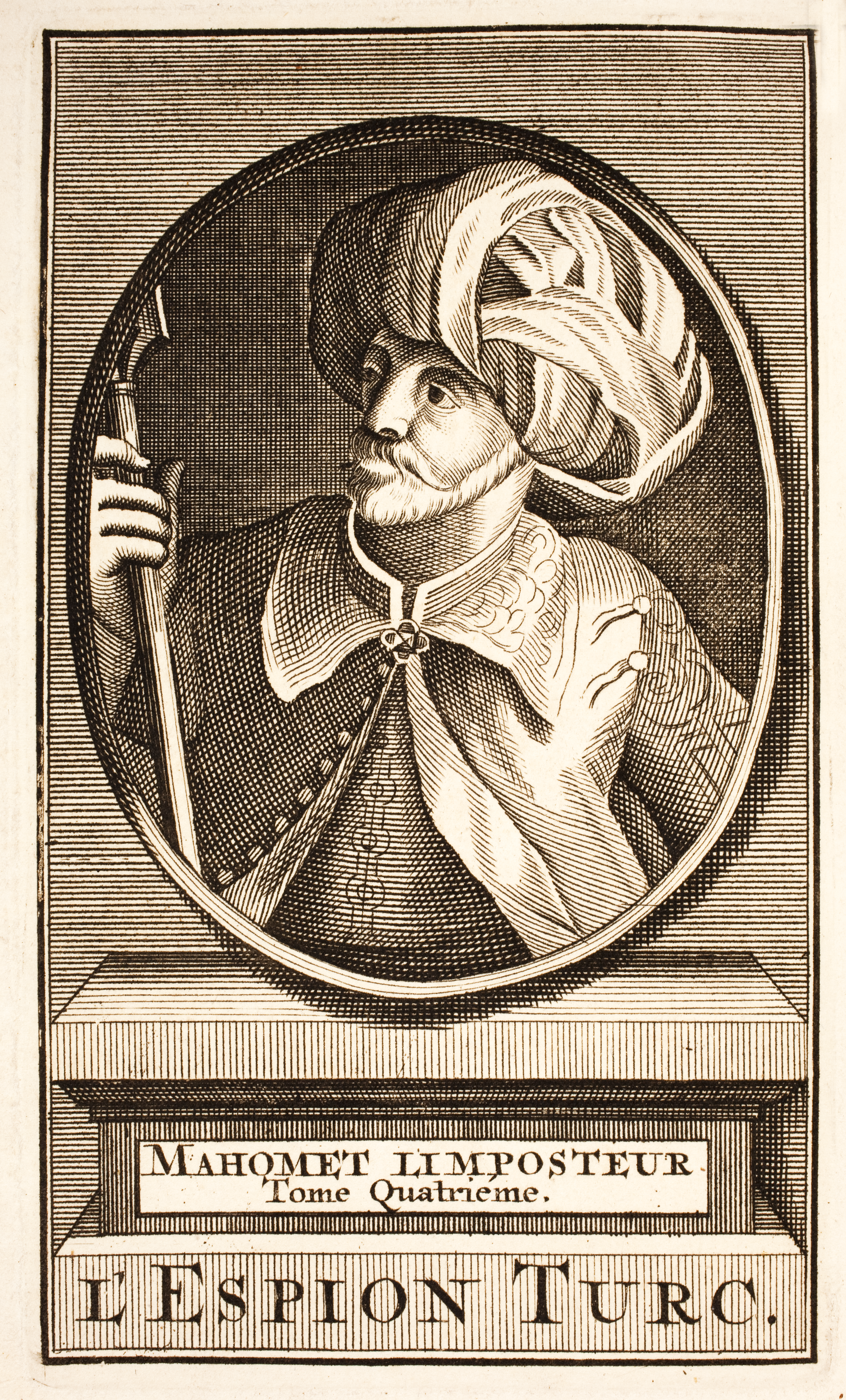
Tome 4. Portrait of Mahomet "The impostor"

It is agreed that the first volume of this work was written by Giovanni Paolo Marana (1642–1693), a Genoese political refugee to the French court of Louis XIV. The first volume (102 letters) was published in several parts between 1684 and 1686 in both Italian and in a French translation. They were translated by William Bradshaw into English in 1687 under the supervision of Robert Midgley, who owned the copyright of the work. The remaining seven volumes appeared first in English between 1691 and 1694, prefaced with a letter claiming that they were translated from a discovered Italian manuscript. A French edition of the last seven volumes (with the first) was published in 1696–7 and asserting that it was a translation from the English. The eight volumes contain 644 letters.

There has long been a controversy as to the authorship of the volumes subsequent to Marana's first. They have been attributed to many writers, most notably Robert Midgley and William Bradshaw, who produced the English translation. However, given the similarities between the letters, and the stylistic coherence of the whole series, the likeliest author is Marana himself. Marana may have had difficulty in getting the later volumes published in France and turned to England to secure their continuing appearance.

The work was popular throughout the 18th century and went through fifteen complete editions by 1801. Daniel Defoe was attracted to the deist rationalist sympathies of the purported spy; his Continuation of Turkish Letters Writ by a Turkish Spy in Paris (1718) extended the narrator's account from 1687 to 1693.

== Content ==
The volumes contain fictional letters written by one "Mahmut the Arabian." The letters cover the period of 1637 to 1682 in France, from the last years of the Regency of Anne of Austria and Cardinal Richelieu through the long reign of Louis XIV and his minister Cardinal Mazarin. The Letters form a rambling journal of gossip on current politics and satire on society. Mahmut sends reports from Paris to Constantinople on politics and current events in France, but corresponds privately on other subjects including religion, and adds stories and anecdotes for diversion. His observations range from those on political figures such as Richelieu and Mazarin to speculations on the status of women, advice about state policy, and major interventions in controversies about religious doctrine and their consequences. His political position in the letters changes from that of liberal Catholic to that of a rationalistic Deist.
