= Mariano d'Ayala =

Sicilian soldier and politician (1808–1877)

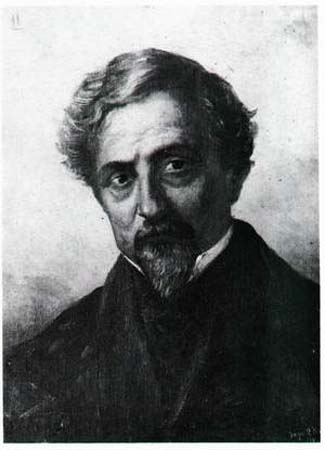
- Born: 14 June 1808; Messina, Sicily
- Died: 26 March 1877 (aged 68); Naples, Italy
- Education: Nunziatella Military School, Naples
- Occupations: Soldier; Writer; Risorgimento activist Teacher; Politician; Member of the Italian Chamber of Deputies; Senator
- Spouse: Giulia Costa
- Children: Alfredo; Elvira; Michelangelo
- Parents: Lt. Col. Raimondo d'Ayala (father); Rosaria Ragusi (mother)

Mariano d'Ayala (14 June 1808 – 26 March 1877) was a Sicilian-born soldier, writer and, after 1848, an activist-politician and member of parliament.

== Biography ==
=== Provenance and early years ===
Mariano d'Ayala was born at Messina at the height of the Napoleonic Wars, and only 25 years after the earthquake which had destroyed the city. Lt. Col. Raimondo d'Ayala, his father, was an Artillery Officer, originally from Spain, who served the Bourbon army loyally. His mother, born Rosaria Ragusi, was from a Sicilian family. He grew up in Messina, where his father became commander at the fort, but was only nine when his father died. He and his mother were both keen that he should follow his father into a military career, and he was still not yet a teenager when his mother took him to Naples and enrolled him at the prestigious Nunziatella Military School. As the orphaned son of a “worthy officer”, he was able to enrol without payment being required.

=== Military academy ===
He graduated in 1828 with the rank of an ensign/ensign and was sent to join a regiment a short distance up the coast at Gaeta. There were no significant wars to be fought in the immediate term, and d'Ayala was given the opportunity to travel in Italy and further abroad, and to build some important friendships, within and beyond the military community, notably with Francesco Ricciardi, Florestano Pepe and Carlo Troya. He was recalled to Naples, where alongside his military duties he accepted a teaching position back at the Nunziatella as a “teacher of artillery”. In 1836 he was appointed to teach Ballistics and Descriptive geometry. To support his teaching he produced translations of works on physics and on analytical and physical geometry by Jean-Baptiste Biot and Charles-François-Antoine Leroy, but the college authorities rejected his use of these, insisting that he should instead teach using the traditional and well respected texts of another French scholar, Sylvestre François Lacroix. A couple of years later he was the only representative from the south to take part in the preparatory work for the Congress of Italian Scientists held under the presidency of Ranieri Gerbi in 1839 and Pisa (Tuscany). At the congress he was entrusted with oversight of the physical sciences and mathematics sections.

In 1840 Mariano d'Ayala married Giulia Costa, the daughter of a survivor from Murat’s army and of the 1820 insurrection. The family connections indicated and reinforced through the marriage indicate that as the so-called Kingdom of the Two Sicilies grew ever more entrenched in conservative tradition, leading to growing tensions between the government in Naples and growing numbers from the educated middle class, inspired by ideas disseminated by the French Revolution and under the First French Empire to favour a transition towards liberalism and even a measure of democracy, Mariano d'Ayala was on the liberal side of the debate. That was also apparent, by 1840, from the company he kept. In addition to those already mentioned above, his Naples friends included his bride’s father, Gaetano Costa, Alessandro Begani, and Emanuele Taddei.

During the early 1840s d'Ayala raised his public profile in Naples with the publication of some of his written work, including a “Military Franco-Italian Dictionary” (1841), a “Lexicon of Artillery” (subsequently reworked and republished in 1854 as a 450-page “Bibliography of Artillery”) and a “Proposal for a College for Artillery Mechanics and Constructors” (‘’” Disegno di una scuola per macchinisti e costruttori per l'artiglieria”’’, 1841). On account of the company he kept and, perhaps, some of his overheard comments, d'Ayala was already coming under government suspicion: there was a concern that he might be turning into a liberal. The king, despite having been viewed as a potential champion of constitutional liberalism during the early years of his reign, was by the 1840s inclined to see liberalism, as threatening to his own position (Liberalism was increasingly becoming intertwined, for a new generation of influential and mainly northern risorgimento nationalists such as Giuseppe Mazzini, with the dream of a united Italy). An article of d'Ayala’s was published during 1843 in a compilation volume, inspired by an inspection visit he had undertaken to a metal-based manufactory in Calabria. He had taken the opportunity to visit places associated with the former king, Murat, who had been executed for treason in 1815 following abrupt regime change. Murat was feted in Italy during his lifetime, and even more so after his execution, as a champion of liberal and nationalist ideals. Through his wife, d'Ayala already had family connections with Murat’s final army, and the eulogistic tone of his article on Murat’s final journey to military defeat and execution on the orders of the king’s father was, at best, tactless. During 1843 d'Ayala was obliged to resign his army commission and leave his post at the Nunziatella Military School. Suspected and on occasion accused of “plotting against the state” he found himself subjected to sometimes intrusive police surveillance. He was arrested on at least two occasions. During 1844, in the aftermath of major riots at Cosenza which greatly alarmed the government, he was imprisoned for several months. In 1846, returning from an academic conference in Genoa, he was stopped and searched by police, who found that he was carrying publications by d'Azeglio, Balbo and Gioberti, men who might be viewed as moderate progressives in Turin, but they were men from the north, and their ideas alarmed the authorities in Naples. D’Ayala was back in prison in September 1847, following serious rioting in Messina and Reggio. On his release three months later, it was apparent that further incarceration had not tamed his political opinions. Indeed, throughout the middle 1840s, when not in prison, d'Ayala continued to share his insights and beliefs with friends and, on occasion, in print: he did not trouble to conceal his risorgimento aspirations.

=== 1848 ===
By some criteria, the 1848 revolutions which spread across Europe were ignited in Sicily. It is also possible to see the Sicilian uprising of 1848 as a continuation and intensification of the rioting that had led to d'Ayala's imprisonment during the last four months of 1847. During December 1847, following his release, it was D’Ayala who, together with Francesco Paolo Bozzelli and Carlo Poerio, took a lead in focusing the continuing street protests to persuade the king to accept a written constitution. A constitution for Sicily, heavily influenced by British ideas of the time, had originally been accepted by a previous king as far back as 1812, and then revoked by the current king's grandfather following the restoration of 1815. The idea was now returned to the table in response to serious continuing street unrest: a constitution was accepted by the king at the end of January 1848 and then promulgated on 10 February 1848. As introduced it owed much to the so-called Charter of 1830 implemented in France under the relatively “constitutional” July Monarchy of 1830–1848. Implementation in Sicily proved far from straightforward, and by the end of the year the document drafted by Bozzoli had been superseded by subsequent events. In retrospect the short-lived Sicilian Constitution of 1848 (sometimes identified in sources as the “Fundamental Law”) attracted criticism both from those who felt it left the king with too much power and from those who said that by emasculating the king's powers it threatened to generate further social and economic dislocation and impoverishment. Nevertheless, its acceptance by the king in February 1848 represented at that time a significant achievement for d'Ayala and those who shared his vision for the future development of Italy. Revolutions of 1848 in the Italian states would come to be seen after 1860 as an important milestone along the path to unification.

Following the promulgation of the constitution there followed three months during which the king ruled – at least in theory – subject to a democratic constitution. Three presidents of the council of ministers (i.e. prime ministers) served in quick succession. The third of these, and probably the most effective, was the historian-politician Carlo Troya, a medievalist with a strong personal commitment to the cause of Italian unification. Troya led the government for seven weeks between 3 April 1848 and 15 May 1848. It was Troya who sent d'Ayala to Aquila as "Intendant" (loosely "regional governor") for the province of Abruzzo Ultra ("Further Abruzzi"), in the far north of the kingdom. This kept him far away from Naples and the continuing political ferment there, an arrangement which evidently suited his temperament well enough. His governance was reportedly both wise and firm. He devised and enforced an end to a long-standing dispute between the Jesuits and the school authorities in Aquila, thereby ensuring that a locally important secondary school could re-open. But his governorship was short-lived.

Parliamentary elections were held on 18 April 1848 and 2 May 1848, resulting in an overwhelmingly liberal parliament being scheduled to open on 15 May 1848. There was a widespread belief that the king's conversion to democracy earlier in the year had been less than whole-hearted. The king knew already that his ministers, under the leadership of Carlo Troya, were believers in Italian unification. Rumours were already circulating. A couple of days before 15 May 1848 the government journal announced the creation of 50 new peers who would sit in the non-elected upper house of the new bicameral parliament. On the eve of 15 May 1848 there was still a heated disagreement under way over the wording of the oath to be sworn by the king and by the members of his parliament. Naples itself was the scene of vicious street fighting on 15 May 1848. With opinion polarised at the time and ever since, it is hard to know exactly what happened. Apparently reasonable estimates range between 200 and 2,000 killed. Several public buildings were stormed by rioters and some were then destroyed. The king's National Guard and (mercenary) Swiss Guard came out to crush the emerging rebellion. The mood spread to the newly elected lower house of parliament, where there were demands from one member, Giovanni La Cecilia, for the non-elected upper house to be abolished and the castles housing the National Guard to be “handed over”. But power did not rest with the parliament. By the end of the day the liberal rebellion had been crushed and a captain of the Swiss guard had appeared before the deputies of the newly elected parliament and ordered them to disband. Pausing only long enough to issue a short but powerful statement of what had happened, and undertaking to reconvene when the situation made it possible, the parliament suspended their session “only because forced to do so by brutal violence”. The next day the king dismissed Carlo Troya and his government. A new head of government, Gennaro Spinelli, was appointed with instructions from the top to create a conservative government committed to opposing the growing threat of liberalism and republicanism. In Aquila Mariano d'Ayala did not wait to see what would happen next. D'Ayala denounced the king's coup against the democratic constitution to which he had himself agreed less than half a year earlier. He condemned Bozzelli for accepting a ministerial position in the Spinelli government (from which Bozzelli, having failed to rein in the new government's oppressive propensities, resigned a few months later). He correctly foresaw the three years of unconstrained political and social repression that a frightened King Ferdinand would inflict on the country during the final three years of his reign. D'Ayala was no longer able to feel safe in his own country and he believed – with good reason - that if he returned to Naples he would be arrested. Instead, during or before June 1848, he fled over the mountains to Rieti, from where he made his way to Florence: the revolution in Tuscany was less polarised and his belief in risorgimento liberalism, seen by many in northern and central Italy as the desirable alternative to the Grand Duchy's existing status as a semi-detached quasi-colonial territory of the Austrian empire, resonated with a widely shared sense of Italian identity.

=== Exile in Tuscany and Piedmont ===
On 25 October 1848, as political developments in Tuscany continued to progress, d'Ayala accepted a position as Minister for War in the Tuscan government being formed under the leadership of the author-politician Francesco Domenico Guerrazzi, who is believed to have been trying to place himself between the Grand Duke Leopold and the more radical street protestors on the streets of Pisa and Florence. Compared to Guerrazzi, whose taste for revolutionary solutions seems to have grown as the political temperature rose, d'Ayala turned out to be something of a moderate. As Minister for War, he founded a military academy (‘’” liceo militare,’’) and drafted a military code (‘’”codice militare”’’). He also undertook a number of military reforms, reflecting the evolving political backdrop[ in Tuscany. Despite some political differences with Guerrazzi, the two men were nevertheless in agreement on the desirability of resuming the war against Austria sooner rather than later. After the proclamation of the short-lived Tuscan Republic and the flight to Gaeta of the Grand Duke, d'Ayala resigned from the Guerrazzi government which was rapidly replaced by a so-called triumvirate followed, in March 1849, by the fifteen day “Guerrazzi dictatorship”. The long-awaited overwhelming military intervention by Austria followed soon afterwards. Following his resignation from government service d'Ayala continued to live a more private life in Florence till 1852. His essay “Degli eserciti nazionale”, which sought to address the perceived intrinsic tensions for maintaining armed forces in a state ruled under a constitution, was published in 1850. The following year he produced a substantial pamphlet on military art. In 1852 he was persuaded to relocate to Turin where he remained till 1860, focusing on study and scholarship.

=== Unification War ===
The Unification War of 1860/61 drew d'Ayala back to political engagement and public service, though this time round his involvement was generally restricted to background roles. On 23 July 1860 he returned to the political chaos of Naples, taking advantage of a general amnesty proclaimed by the new king there. He had acquired from his experiences in 1848 the conviction that the key to achieving liberation from monarchical despotism for the south (and Austrian despotism in the north) lay in winning round members of the armies engaged. He tried to encourage contacts in the military to abandon the discredited Bourbon monarchs and throw in their lot with Garibaldi's still growing volunteer army approaching across Sicily. D'Ayala had already issued a pamphlet from Florence before his arrival in the south, robustly addressing the same pro-Garibaldi message to members of the Neapolitan army. Garibaldi arrived in the city with his large volunteer army on 6 September 1860 and d'Ayala was appointed to the position commander of the National Guard. However, he was very soon relieved of this commend by ”Pro-dictator” Giorgio Pallavicino. There are some indications that following his return to Naples in 1860, d'Ayala encountered dome difficulty in gaining the confidence of fellow risorgimento believers. During his long exile between 1848 and 1860 he had not sustained contacts with fellow exiles, and there was uncertainty over precisely where his true loyalties might lie in the rapidly shifting political and military context of 1860/61.

=== Parliament: lower house (Chamber of Deputies) ===
The Kingdom of Italy was proclaimed, formally, on 17 March 1861. Elections for the lower house of parliament, the Chamber of Deputies, had already taken place on 27 January 1861 and 3 February 1861. Mariano d'Ayala was elected a member of parliament, representing the Avezzano (Abruzzi) electoral district on behalf of the minority Centrist-left parliamentary grouping of Urbano Rattazzi. He was re-elected in each of the next three elections, in 1865, 1867 and 1870, by which time he was representing “Napoli V”, one of the Naples electoral districts. He supported the Rattazzi governments in 1862 and 1867. In 1864 he voted in favour of the transfer of government (and of parliament) from Turin to Florence. When the opportunity arose, as on several occasions it did, he voted in favour of amnesties for Giuseppe Mazzini who had collected a couple of death sentences, and through most of the 1860s remained in exile in Switzerland or England in order to minimize the risk of execution. Otherwise d'Ayala intervened only rarely in parliamentary debates, though in May 1870 he became prominently engaged in the discussions that year of navy and war budgets. In 1870 most of Rome was annexed to the rest of Italy by military force; and on 3 February 1871 the city acquired the status and role of a capital in place of Florence. (The status of the residual city quarter separately administered as the Holy See was not agreed till 1929.) For d'Ayala the virtual completion of the risorgimento project invited a rethink on progress to date and next steps.. In 1870 he was a leading mover in the creation and operation of a new political association based in Naples, the “Plebiscito” which drew up a political action plan. Some of the proposals were as follows: • King Victor Emmanuel II, who had already been the king of Piedmont-Sardinia since 1849, should be invited to mark the near-completion of the new state by resetting the legislative calendar to Year 1 of a new reign, and by using a new name, as “King Victor I”. • Government should operate independently of political parties. • There were proposals for administrative decentralisation • Electoral law should be “partially expanded” • Regulation of party candidate lists should include scrutiny in order to discourage and undermine habits if “clientelism” – the corrupt peddling of political influence by members of parliament, whereby wealthy and powerful minority groups might obtain political or material benefits at the expense of the wider public interest. • Reimbursement of reasonable expenses incurred for members of parliament The “Plebiscito” proposals gained little traction nationally, and indeed in the General Election of 1874 d'Ayala failed to secure re-election. They nevertheless give an intriguing insight into his ideas on how the recently established system of parliamentary democracy in Italy should be improved. Some of them subsequently became mainstream: others sank with little trace.

=== Parliament: upper house (Senate) ===
By 1874 d'Ayala's army career was also over. Appointed “General of the Volunteers” ("… Corpo dei volontari italiani") in July 1861 he had been welcomed into the king's army in March 1862, with his rank of a Major general, which he had held since 15 October 1860 (five months before the completion of the Liberation War and the Proclamation of the Kingdom) confirmed. A succession of further leadership roles within the army followed till his retirement from it, at his own request, with effect from 13 August 1867. Like most of the Risorgimento true believers, Mariano d'Ayala was a freemason and in the aftermath of unification following his return from Turin he became well networked in Naples. Whether through brother masons at the “Bandiera e Moro” lodge, or some combination of his army and political contacts, he was drawn into local politics, serving as a Naples city councillor between June 1861 and 1876. He even served a term as deputy mayor of the city in 1868.

On 15 May 1876 Mariano d'Ayala was nominated to membership of the senate (upper house of the bicameral Italian parliament). Appointment to the senate came from the king, who would receive appropriate advice from his ministers. In addition, there were various sets of criteria that had to be considered before a nomination could progress. D'Ayala was eligible for nomination both because he had served three terms as a member of the Chamber of Deputies and because he had served at least six years in the army. His nomination was validated by the senate on 6 June 1876 and he was sworn in on 19 June 1876.

After ten months as a senator, Mariano d'Ayala died at Naples on 26 March 1877.

== Recognition (selection) ==
- Commander of the Order of Saints Maurice and Lazarus
- Commander of the Order of the Crown of Italy

== Published output (selection) ==
- Memorie storico-militari dal 1734 al 1815, Napoli: tip. di F. Fernandes, 1835
- Le vite de più celebri capitani e soldati napoletani dalla giornata di Bitonto fino a' dì nostri, di Mariano d'Ayala. Napoli: Stamperia dell'Iride, 1843 (Google libri)
- Napoli militare, Napoli: Stamperia dell'Iride, 1847 (Google libri)
- Biografia di Giuseppe barone Rosaroll, maresciallo di campo napolitano, Napoli: Tipografia G. Cannavacciuoli, 1848
- Degli eserciti nazionali, Firenze: Tipografia Italiana, 1850
- I piemontesi in Crimea, Firenze: Società editrice (Firenze: Barbera, Bianchi e C.), 1858
- Vite degl italiani benemeriti della libertà e della patria, Firenze: Coi tipi di M. Cellini, 1868. Edizione postuma a cura dei figli: Vite degl'italiani benemeriti della libertà e della patria, uccisi dal carnefice, Roma ecc.: Fratelli Bocca, 1883
- I Liberi Muratori di Napoli nel secolo XVIII, in Archivio storico per le Provincie napoletane, XXIII, 1898, pp. 84 e succ..

Reference was also made, following his death, to a large body of written work by d'Ayala which at that time remained unpublished.
