= Giustino Fortunato (1777–1862) =

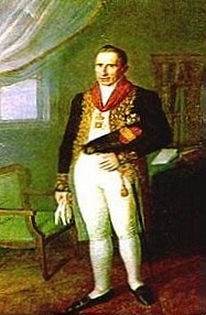
Giustino Fortunato

Giustino Fortunato, also known as Giustino Fortunato senior (20 August 1777 – 22 August 1862) was an Italian magistrate and politician. His nephew was the Italian historian and politician Giustino Fortunato (1848-1932).

== Biography ==
Born in Rionero in Vulture, little town in Basilicata, to a middle-class family, he moved to Naples to study jurisprudence. Follower of the Jacobin ideas, he was a student of Carlo Lauberg and met other intellectuals such as Francesco Mario Pagano, Ettore Carafa, Emanuele De Deo and Ignazio Ciaia. He taught math at the Nunziatella military academy for a short time.

With the rise of the Parthenopean Republic in 1799, he was nominated Judge of the Peace. After the arrival of the anti-republican troops of the cardinal Fabrizio Ruffo, Fortunato fought them in a desperate battle at the "Ponte della Maddalena". Defeated, he was imprisoned in the Sant'Elmo castle but, with the help of Vincenzo Parisi, he fled and hid in his house in Moliterno. After the Bourbon restoration, he exercised the lawyer profession.

Under the government of Joachim Murat, he covered judicial duties and, along with Vincenzo Cuoco and Pietro Napoli Signorelli, had a great role in the rebirth of the Accademia Pontaniana (1808); Fortunato's house was a meeting place of intellectuals like Melchiorre Delfico, Vincenzo Monti, David Winspeare, Michele Tenore and Teodoro Monticelli. In 1814, Murat nominated him intendant of Chieti. After the Treaty of Casalanza, Fortunato remained in the rank of bureaucracy under Ferdinand I but was fired for having supported the Carbonari riots in 1820. He was reinstated by his nephew Ferdinand II, who gave him the mansion of minister without portfolio (1841) and finance minister (1847).

In 1849, he became President of the Council of Ministers, also known as prime minister, and Minister of Foreign Affairs of the Kingdom of the Two Sicilies until 1852. His government, because of the revolution of 1848 against the monarchy, was absolute and conservative. Accused of servility to the king, he was strongly criticized by Giuseppe Ricciardi, Giacomo Racioppi, Pier Silvestro Leopardi and, in particular, Luigi Settembrini, who considered him an insatiable and fierce hyena. However, Fortunato seconded the sovereign in the convictions against the liberals.

He was dismissed by Ferdinand II for not having informed him about the William Gladstone's letters, sent from Naples to the Parliament of London, defining the Kingdom as a negation of God erected to a system of government. Paolo Ruffo, the ambassador in London, had informed Fortunato about the content of the letters, but he did not inform the king. The king was cognizant of Fortunato's past liberal leanings, and suspected Fortunato didn't inform him voluntarily to facilitate the spread of the letters. After the discharge, Fortunato was elected president of the "Royal Academy of Sciences" from 1855 to 1857. He died in Naples in 1862.

== Honours ==
- Sacred Military Constantinian Order of Saint George, Knight Grand Cross
- Royal Order of Francis I, Knight Grand Cross
- Order of Saint George and Reunion, Knight Grand Cross
- Order of the White Eagle (Russia), Knight
- Order of Saint Stephen of Hungary, Knight Grand Cross
- Order of Leopold (Austria), Knight Grand Cross
- Order of Pius IX, Knight Grand Cross
- Order of the Red Eagle, Knight, First Class
- Legion of Honour, Knight Grand Cross
- Order of Saints Maurice and Lazarus, Knight Grand Cross
- Order of Saint Joseph, Knight Grand Cross
- Order of the Dannebrog, Knight Grand Cross
- Order of Leopold (Belgium), Grand Cordon
- Order of the Oak Crown, Grand Cross

== Bibliography ==
- Gerardo Raffaele Zitarosa, Giustino Fortunato storico, Pellegrini, 1970
- Raffaele De Cesare, La fine di un regno (Napoli e Sicilia), S. Lapi, 1900
- Harold Acton, Gli ultimi Borboni di Napoli (1825–1861), Giunti, 1997
