= Giuseppe Ricciardi =

Italian politician

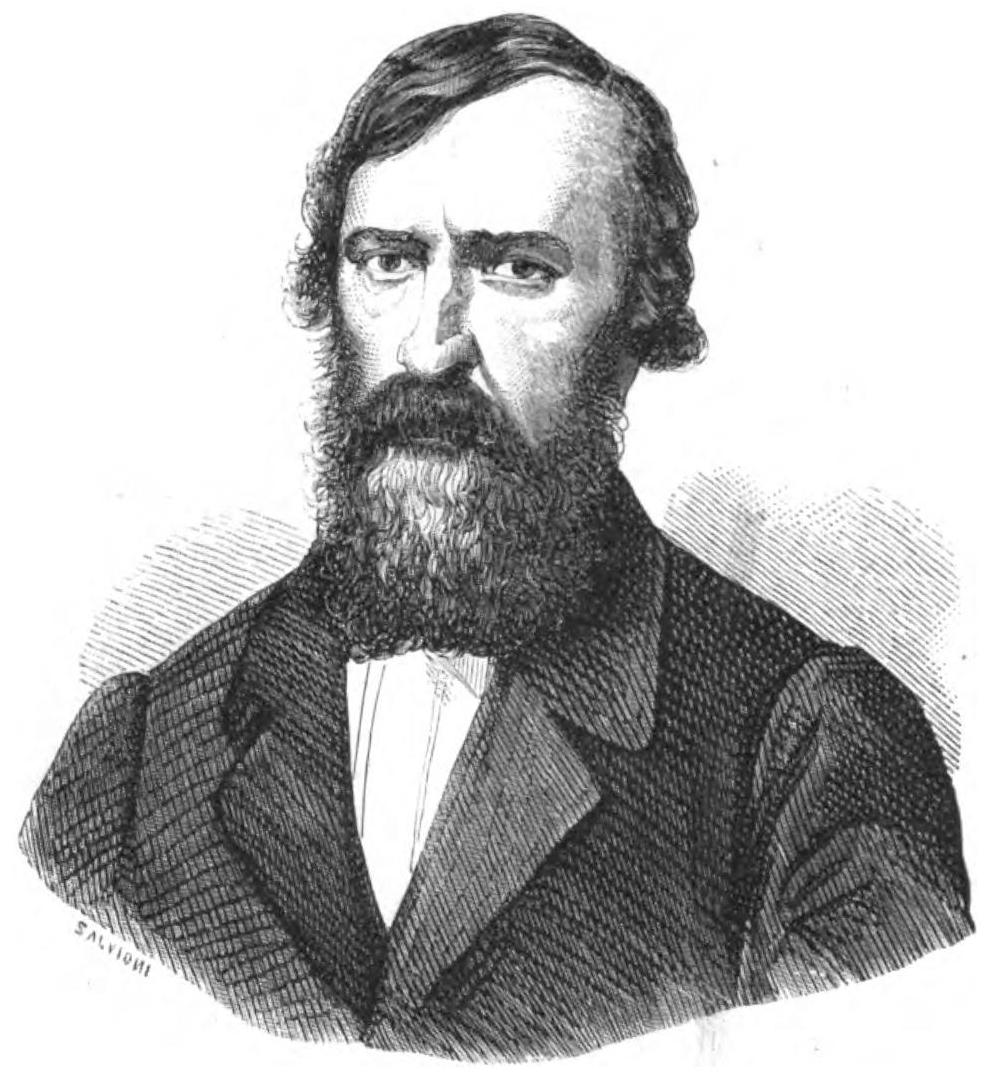

Deputy of the Kingdom of Italy
- In office 18 February 1861 – 2 November 1870
- Monarch: Victor Emmanuel II

Personal details
- Born: July 19, 1808 Naples, Kingdom of the two Sicilies
- Died: 1 June 1882 (aged 73) Naples, Kingdom of Italy
- Spouse: Clorinda Not
- Children: Luisa (1840) and Elisabetta (1846)
- Parent(s): Francesco Ricciardi (1758–1842) and Luisa Granito (1769–1832)
- Profession: Politician and publisher

Count Giuseppe Napoleone Ricciardi of Camaldoli (Naples, 19 July 1808 – Naples, 1 June 1882) was an Italian man of letters, patriot, politician and publisher, exponents of romantic ideals and political radicalism during the period of unification of Italy.

== Biography ==
The second son of jurist Francesco Ricciardi (Minister of Justice of the Napoleonic Kingdom of Naples of Joachim Murat), and Marchioness Luisa Granito (poet), Giuseppe Ricciardi grew up in a cosmopolitan family environment, with intense social and intellectually stimulating relations.

He studied extensively the works of Henri de Saint-Simon, Robert Owen, Charles Fourier, and, above all, François-Noël Babeuf.

In 1832, he began publishing the journal The Progress in Naples, modeled after Vieusseux's Florentine Anthology, which had been closed by Austrian censorship. With a liberal-radical orientation, the journal frequently addressed economic and political topics, and had numerous contributors, among others, Saverio Baldacchini, Paolo Emilio Imbriani, Luca de Samuele Cagnazzi, Luigi Blanch, Lodovico Bianchini, Matteo De Augustinis. Thus it quickly achieved great renown in Italy, and became a sort of "organ of Neapolitan Romanticism".

Defined as a «worldly and salon-loving rebel» by Carlo Dionisotti, Ricciardi was initiated into Mazzini's "Young Italy" in 1832, and participated in some of his attempted insurrections. For this reason, he was arrested in September 1834, and released after a period of detention, he was forced into exile on October 15, 1836.

From then on, he resided primarily in France, where for a time he frequented utopians, groups of social reformers, and Saint-Simonians, but he remained opposed to communism and the destruction of private property. He also carried out intense propaganda activities along Mazzinian-democratic lines in favour of Italian unification, in his works. He had contacts in London with Mazzini, in Geneva with Sismondi, in Paris with David Levi and Cristina Belgiojoso. Among other activities, he supported the Bandiera brothers' attempt in June 1844, providing them with information on the Cosenza uprisings that had already occurred on March 15, 1844.

Returning to Naples in April 1848, during the Revolutions that led to the constitutional government of Carlo Troya, Ricciardi was elected to the Neapolitan parliament. After Ferdinand II's coup on May 15, 1848, which dissolved the democratic parliament and replaced the liberal Troya with the reactionary Gennaro Spinelli, Prince of Cariati, Ricciardi descended into Calabria, where the protest against king Ferdinand II had taken the form of an armed rebellion, and presided over the Committee of Public Safety, the Calabrian revolutionary executive. After the defeat of the Domenico Mauro's troops by the Bourbon general Ferdinando Lanza at Campotenese (June 30, 1848), Ricciardi, along with other patriots, managed to escape to Corfu.

In 1849, he fled to Malta, Tuscany, again in France, and then in Piemonte. In the 1850s, after becoming anti-Mazzinian, Ricciardi contributed to Ausonio Franchi's republican and anticlerical newspaper, The Reason, arguing, among other things, that one of the duties of the state was to ensure that no one died of hunger. Due to illness, he was unable to participate in Garibaldi's Expedition of the Thousand in 1860.

After the unification of Italy, he served as a member of parliament from 1861 to 1870, aligning himself with the left-wing coalition, but he was now disillusioned with the way national unity had come about. He also unsuccessfully attempted to have Naples made the provisional capital of the Kingdom, as it was the most populous city in Italy.

In 1869, coinciding with the opening of the First Vatican Council, he organized an anti-council in Naples: this attempt was supported by figures such as Garibaldi and Victor Hugo, but due to the indifference of many of his friends and the italian Freemasonry, of which he had become a member, it proved unsuccessful.

Ricciardi was a prolific writer, and published his major works in eight volumes at his own expense until 1870 (Selected Works). He died almost forgotten by the political world.

== Works ==
- Discorso intorno alle norme da seguitarsi dagl'Italiani nel procacciare l'indipendenza, l'unità e la libertà della patria, Paris 1843;
- Alla santa memoria di Attilio ed Emilio Bandiera, Domenico Moro, Nicolo Ricciotti, Anacarsi Nardi, Francesco Berti, Jacopo Venerucci, Jacopo Rocca e Domenico Lupatelli, morti per la libertà italiana in Cosenza a 25 luglio del 1844. Epicedio di G. R., Paris 1844;
- Conforti all'Italia, ovvero preparamenti all'insurrezione, Paris 1846;
- Gloria e sventura. Canti repubblicani, Paris 1839;
- Poesie di G. R., per la prima volta riunite, con aggiunta di varie inedite, Paris 1844;
- Lettera di G. R. agli elettori di Capitanata, Bastia 1848;
- Agli abitanti del Napoletano. Discorso d'un repubblicano, Paris 1848;
- Histoire de la Révolution d'Italie en 1848, suivie d'un aperçu sur les évènements des six premiers mois de 1849, Paris 1849;
- Drammi storici, Paris 1855;
- Profili biografici di contemporanei, Nizza 1859;
- Martirologio italiano dal 1792 al 1847. Libri dieci di G. R., Florence 1860;
- Discorsi profferiti nel Parlamento italiano nel primo periodo della sessione del 1861, Naples 1861;
- Histoire de l'Italie et de ses rapports avec l'Autriche depuis 1815 jusqu'à nos jours, illustrations of C. Mettais, Paris 1861;
- Napoli capitale. Pensieri, Naples 1864;
- L'Anticoncilio di Napoli, promosso e descritto da G. R., Naples 1870;
- Schizzi fotografici dei deputati del 1. 2. e 3. Parlamento italiano, Naples 1870;
- Opere scelte di Giuseppe Ricciardi (Selected Works), Naples 1870;
- La Repubblica di S. Marino e l'Italia, studio storico-critico, Naples 1871;
- Una pagina del 1848, ovvero Storia documentata della sollevazione delle Calabrie, Naples 1873;
- Memorie autografe d'un ribelle, Naples 1873;
- Da Quarto a Caprera, dai 5 maggio ai 9 novembre del 1860. Storia dei mille narrata al popolo da G. R., susseguita da documenti, e da una scena lirica sullo stesso argomento, Naples 1875;
- Guerra alla povertà. Cenni sulla quistione sociale, Naples 1877;
- Uno sguardo al futuro, ovvero testamento politico di G. R., già deputato al Parlamento italiano, Naples 1879.

== Bibliography ==
- Joseph McCabe (1920). "RICCIARDI, Count Giuseppe Napoleone". A Biographical dictionary of modern rationalists. London: Watts & Co.
- Mazzoni, Guido (1936). "RICCIARDI, Giuseppe". Enciclopedia Italiana. Rome: Istituto dell'Enciclopedia Italiana.
- di Mauro, Luca (2016). "RICCIARDI, Giuseppe". Dizionario Biografico degli Italiani (in Italian). Vol. 87: Renzi–Robortello. Rome: Istituto dell'Enciclopedia Italiana. ISBN 978-88-12-00032-6.
