= Maria Teresa di San Clemente =

Maria Teresa, Duchess di San Clemente (also Maria Teresa Arezzo) (1760-1822 CE) was an Italian courtier, a confidant and adviser of the de facto ruler and queen of Naples, Maria Carolina of Austria. She was also a known natural scientist and participated in politics several times during the reign of the queen and during the Parthenopean Republic.

== Life ==
She was born to the Sicilian marquis Orazio Arezzo and Maria FitsGerald from Ireland, and married in 1775 to Simeone Vincenzo Velluti Zati, baron di Galluccio and duke di San Clemente. The marriage was unhappy and she left her spouse because of spousal abuse and returned to Naples.

In Naples, she became known for her intellectual qualities and interest in natural science, and regarded as an ideal of a female scholar. She corresponded with intellectuals such as Alberto Fortis and Saverio Scròfani.

She was appointed lady-in-waiting to queen Maria Carolina and became her personal confidante and favorite. They were both members of the Freemason adoptive lodge Saint Jean du Secret et de la Parfaite Amitié and used to visit it together.

San Clemente weas known to be an intimate adviser of the queen. She was an influential figure at court, and participated in state affairs in several occasions. In 1786, she advised against the contemplated arrest of the Spanish ambassador despite the great support for it at court at the time. In 1794, she appealed in favor of Annibale Giordano, who was in danger of being sentenced to death accused of republican conspiracy, and managed to have him saved from death penalty. She also defended Luigi de' Medici when he was accused of opposition activities. Reportedly, she and Caterina de San Marco were the favorites of the queen prior to Lady Emma Hamilton and resented Hamilton's rise to favor.

Being a supporter of the Enlightenment, she resented the conservative politics adopted by the queen after the French Revolution. When the royal family fled to Sicily and the Parthenopean Republic was declared in Naples in 1799, she became an active supporter and financed several of its projects.

When the Parthenopean Republic fell in 1800, San Clemente was arrested for her support to the republic. She pretended to be pregnant and had her trial postponed several months because of this. When her deception was discovered, she appealed to be exiled instead of executed. Her appeal was accepted, and she left Naples and settled in Rome.
