= Saverio Baldacchini =

Italian poet and politician

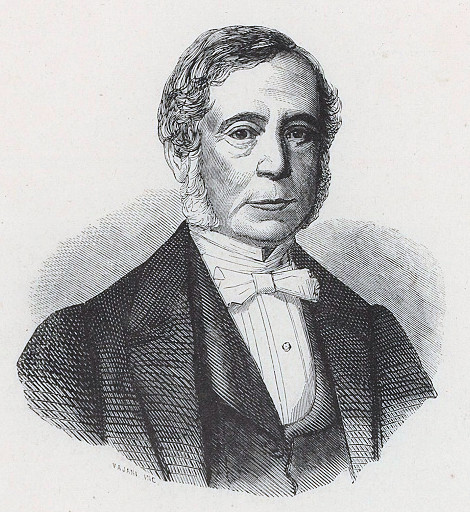
Baldacchini

Saverio Baldacchini (born Francesco Saverio Baldacchini Gargano; 24 April 1800, Barletta - 13 March 1879, Naples) was an Italian politician, writer and poet.

== Life ==
Born into an aristocratic family originating in Amantea, he was the son of Giuseppe Baldacchini and Giovanna Vecchioni. His father died when he and his brother Michele were still very young and so the family moved to Naples, where he studied under the historian Carlo Troya, published political essays whilst still a student and finally ended up in exile after the failure of the 1820-1821 Revolution. He travelled extensively in Italy, Paris and Britain, reaching as far as London and becoming friends with politicians and intellectuals such as Carlo and Alessandro Poerio. He also took part in the debate between classicism and romanticism.

He returned to Italy in 1837, where he backed Basilio Puoti's moves for purism in Italian literature. He wrote an essay in Puoti's honour, in which he sought to refute accusations of pedantry against Puoti, perhaps arising from a misunderstanding of Ultimo dei puristi by Francesco De Sanctis. In 1840 Baldacchini married the widowed mother of Ruggero Bonghi, who was greatly influenced by his new step-father. He became more and more involved in moderate liberal politics, founding several daily newspapers and in 1848 becoming a deputy to the Neapolitan Parliament for the college of Bari. There he headed a movement to put the constitution into immediate effect and became president of the Commission for Public Education. After Ferdinand II's coup and the replacement of Carlo Troya's government with that of Gennaro Spinelli di Cariati on 15 May 1848, Baldacchini left politics to devote himself to writing.

After Italian unification he returned to politics, taking an active interest in reforming the school system of the former Kingdom of the Two Sicilies and strengthening Naples University and the Accademia Pontaniana. He was elected as a deputy in the Kingdom of Italy's parliament for the Barletta college and was President of the Chamber's Library Commission from 1863 to 1865, but he was defeated by Pasquale Petrone in the repeat of the cancelled 1865 elections. His nomination as a senator in 1868 was not confirmed and a few days later had a stroke, leaving him paralysed for the rest of his life.

== Opera ==
Purist and classicist, Baldacchini was sensitive to romantic influences in art literature, and after the release of the poem Ugo da Cortona (1839) he found himself at the center of the classic-romantic controversies, as for some he was romantic, for others an exemplary classicist. Come sintetizzò Guido Mazzoni, Saverio Baldacchini «romanticheggiò classicamente». He also wrote a novel in verse Claudio Vannini or The Artist (1835),

== Works ==
=== Poems ===
- Ugo da Cortona : canti di Saverio Baldacchini. Napoli: Off. Tipografica, 1839
- L'Ideale : versi alla primavera del 1857. Napoli: Stamperia del Fibreno, 1857
- Riposi ed ombre : versi. Napoli: Stamperia del Fibreno, 1858
- Polinnia : versi raccolti nell'inverno del 1859. Napoli: stamperia del Fibreno, 1859 (on-line)
- Espero, Inedite di Saverio Baldacchini : 1850-1860. Napoli: F. Giannini, 1867
- Claudio Vannini o l'artista : canto. Napoli: De Stefano e soci, 1836 (on-line)
- Nuovi canti e traduzioni. Napoli: Stab. tip. Ghio, 1869
- Rime scelte

=== Prose ===
- Prose. 3 voll. Napoli: Stamperia del vaglio, 1873
- Purismo e romanticismo, a cura di Edmondo Cione. Bari: G. Laterza, 1936

== Bibliography (in Italian) ==
- Leonardo Ambrosini, Saverio Baldacchini: l'uomo e il patriotta, lo scrittore e il poeta. Bari: Società tipografica pugliese, 1924
- Mario Quattrucci, Baldacchini Gargano, Francesco Saverio, in «Dizionario biografico degli Italiani», vol. V, Istituto dell'Enciclopedia Italiana, Roma 1963.
- Treccani
