= Melchiorre Delfico =

Melchiorre Delfico may refer to:

- Melchiorre Delfico (caricaturist) (1825–1895), Italian artist, composer and master of the Neapolitan art of caricature
- Melchiorre Delfico (economist) (1744–1835), Italian economist
