= Poerio =

Poerio is a surname. Notable people with the surname include:

- Alessandro Poerio (1802–1848), Italian poet and patriot
- Bonaventura Poerio (1648–1722), Italian Roman Catholic archbishop
- Carlo Poerio (1803–1867), Italian poet, Risorgimento and 1848 Revolution activist, and politician
- Raimondo Poerio, Italian Roman Catholic bishop
