= Strummolo =

Neapolitan name for a spinning top

The strummolo ([strummolo]; in Neapolitan: "strùmmolo", pronounced ['strummələ]) is the Neapolitan name for a spinning top. The game has Mexican origins. The top is made up of a spindle, which is usually wooden, and ends in a metal point and a cord used to toss it.

== Origins and use ==
The term, strummolo, likely comes from the Greek word, strombos (στρόμβος) or strobilos (στρόβιλος), which means "swirl" (mulinello) or "object able to turn."

In the Domestic Neapolitan and Tuscan Vocabulary, compiled by Basilio Puoti, in 1841, the top is defined as a "wooden object shaped like a cone, with a metal point on top, that children use to play, making it turn with a string attached around it."

The top is ribbed horizontally, to make it easier to wind the string around it. Once the string is wound around the top, the child holds the end and puts the top in the palm of their hand. Then, with a quick movement of the wrist, he or she opens his or her hand and throws the top to the ground, still holding onto the string. This makes the top spin quickly on its metal handle. The point is clearly to make the top spin for the longest amount of time possible, and the game can be played alone or as a competition between more children.

Besides the classic spinning top game illustrated above, Puoti also described the aliossi, ferri, naibi or coderone variations.

When the throw wouldn't be successful and the top would fall sideways and wouldn't spin, they would use the expression, "to do a cappellaccio." This literally means a 'large hat' or figuratively, having made 'a big mistake.'

== Use in the Neapolitan language ==
The strummolo or spinning top, entered into the figurative Neapolitan language, giving rise to a series of idiomatic sayings.

One common Neapolitan expression, typically said with exasperation, is o spavo è curto e 'o strummolo è a tiriteppola: which literally means the twine is short and the spinning top swerves from all sides, said to illustrate an entangled and irreparable combination of things that don't work. Another is "vedimmo si è 'o strummolo o 'a funicella" (let's see if it's the spinning top or the string), meaning let's try to understand what it is exactly that doesn't work. The expression "paré 'nu strummolo" (to be like a spinning top, a silly person) can be a friendly or joking way to tease someone. It can also be used as a homophony with and in the place of strùnz, a vulgar term to insult someone, meaning bastard.

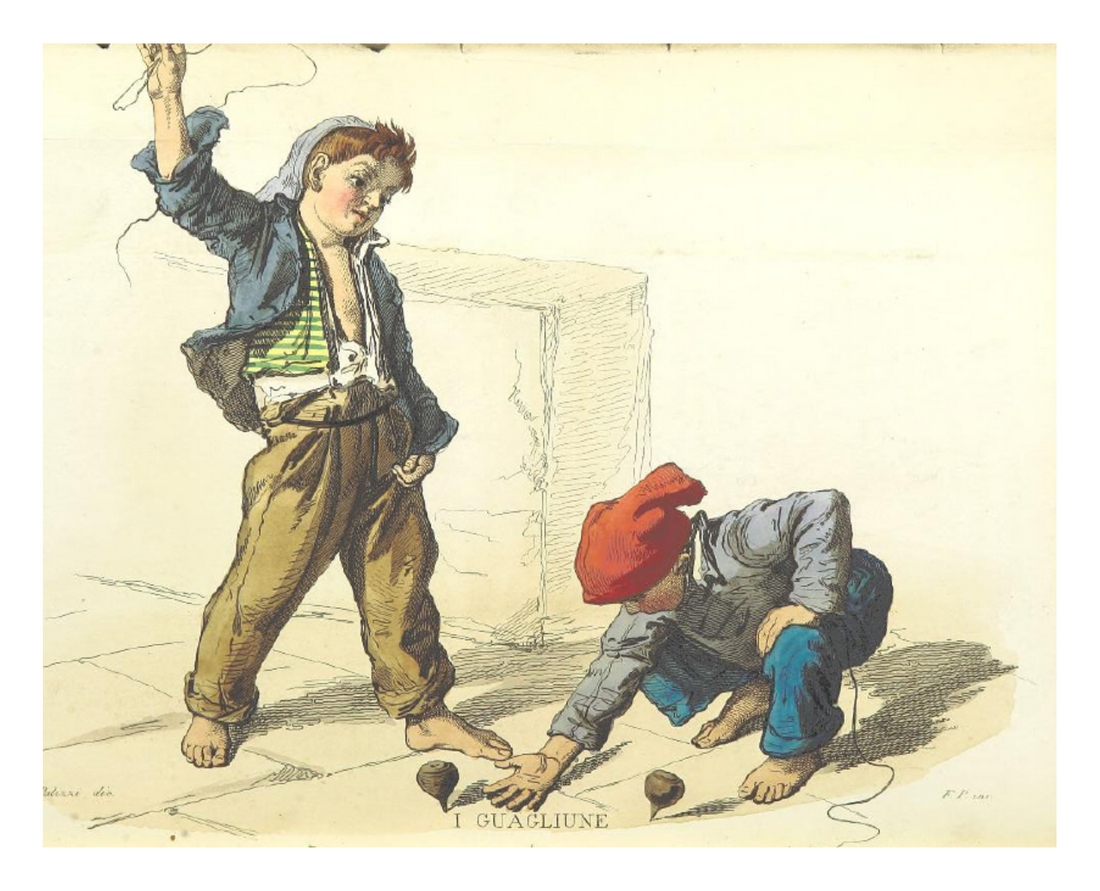
1853, The boys, Fil.Palizzi Illustration, F.P. Engraver, Neapolitan Uses and Customs and Described and Painted Sketches vol.1, p.418

== The name in other regions ==
In Western Sicily, strummolo takes the name of strùmmula, strùmmalu , or strùmmulu , while in Eastern Sicily it is called tuppéttu . There are even many other less commonly used names, like paloggiu, which comes from the dialect from Messina. In Taranto, it takes the name of 'u currùchələ, which is derived from curru + rutulu or from the Latin, carruca. Similar terms, curutulu e curuddhu are used in Lecce. In Lizzano, however, it is called pirrùculu , while in Scorrano it is called fìtu .

== Bibliography ==
- Paolo Izzo (2003). Historical Neapolitan Games: The games of our grandparents in seven centuries of Neapolitan Literature. Printed by Valentino.

== External Attachments ==
- YouTube video on the spinning top game
