= Larghi =

Larghi is an Italian surname. Notable people with the surname include:

- Bernardino Larghi (1812–1877), Italian surgeon
- Thiago Larghi (born 1980), Brazilian football manager
