= Domenico Caracciolo =

Italian diplomat and politician (1715-1789)

Domenico Caracciolo FRS
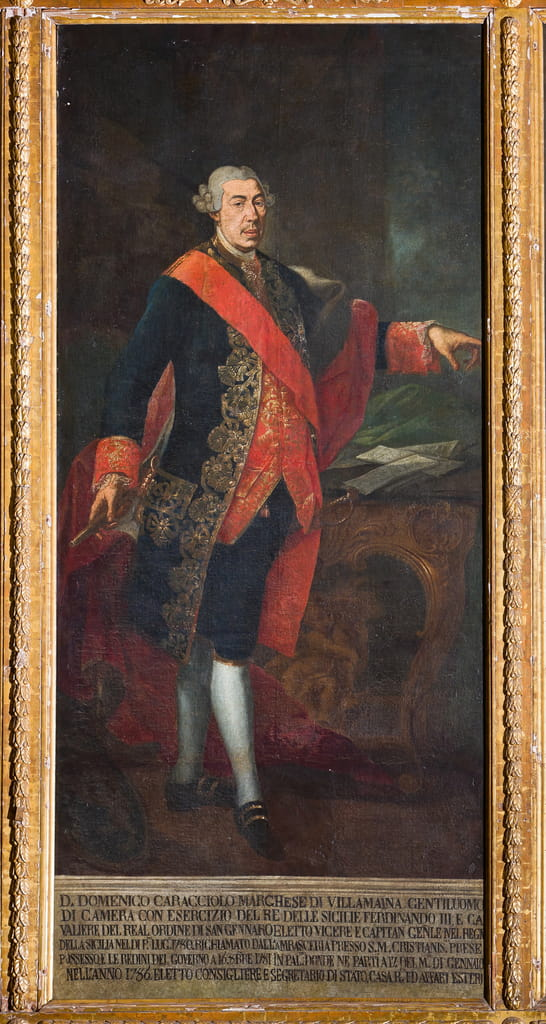
- Portrait of Domenico Caracciolo by Gaetano Mangano

Prime Minister
- In office 18 January 1786 – 16 July 1789
- Monarch: Ferdinand IV of Naples
- Preceded by: Giuseppe Beccadelli di Bologna
- Succeeded by: Sir John Acton, 6th Baronet

Personal details
- Born: 2 October 1715 Malpartida de la Serena, Spain
- Died: 16 July 1789 (aged 73) Naples, Kingdom of Naples

Domenico Caracciolo, marquess of Villamaina FRS (2 October 1715 – 16 July 1789) was diplomat and politician in the Kingdom of Naples.

== Life ==
=== Family origins and education ===
Domenico Caracciolo was the son of Tommaso, Marquess of Villamaina and Capriglia, two small towns in what is now the province of Avellino (then known as the 'Principato Ultra'). He was born in Spain, where his father was a lieutenant colonel in the service of Philip V of Spain. Educated in Naples, he began his career in the magistracy with a post as a judge in the Gran Corte della Vicaria, but he and that field proved mutually unsuited to one another, thus forcing him to broaden his horizons and begin a diplomatic career.

=== Diplomatic career ===
Between 1752 and 1753, during the reign of Charles III of Spain and at the height of Bernardo Tanucci's power, he held two short consecutive posts. After this he spent decades as the Kingdom of Naples' diplomatic representative across Europe – he was envoy extraordinary to Turin from 1754 to 1764, and then to London from 1764 to 1771, where he became a close friend with Vittorio Alfieri, who became a father-figure to him, "a man of high wisdom and droll wit" and "more than a father in love". He was also elected a Fellow of the Royal Society in 1765.

After Britain, Caracciolo moved to France for a diplomatic post, remaining there between 1771 and 1781. There he came into close contact with the more advanced circles of the French Enlightenment. He was remarkably successful, so much so that his friendship was sought by figures as notable as Jacques Necker, Paul Henri Thiry d'Holbach, Claude-Adrien Helvétius and Jean Baptiste d'Alembert. Some of his success was down to his ability to organise parties and his undoubted ability to be assertive in Parisian circles as a "delightful conversationalist".

=== Politician and reformer ===
After his time as a diplomat, Caracciolo had a high political career, spending five years as viceroy of Sicily. He was appointed to the post in May 1780 but only took it up in 1781, since he was reluctant to leave Paris for Sicily. His experience of the French Enlightenment led him a policy of opening up reforms as viceroy. This brought him into open and sometimes successful conflict with the privileges of the aristocracy and clergy, in which he was supported by some of the middle class, who were more inclined to support the monarchy's moderate reform policy. For example, he had the collaboration of Sicily' Inquisitor General, the reforming bishop Ventimiglia, in abolishing the Holy Office in Sicily. He managed to establish new rules for the administration of justice and feudal common lands. For various reasons, including the terrible earthquakes that devastated Messina in 1783, he had to give up on what he considered the most important reform – the creation of a class in which at first sight seemed to be described and designated property by its borders, cultures and annuities, a basic and essential preliminary to a taxation feudal and ecclesiastical estates

His next and final post was as Secretary of state (effectively prime minister) to Ferdinand I of the Two Sicilies from 1786 until his death in 1789, succeeding Giuseppe Beccadelli della Sambuca, in the post that had once belonged to his mentor Tanucci, but his reforming policy came into conflict with Sir John Acton's political ascendancy in Naples.

== Works ==
In 1785, at Palermo, he anonymously published Riflessioni su l'economia e l'estrazione dei frumenti della Sicilia fatte in occasione della carestia dell'Indizione terza 1784 e 1785 (Reflections on the economy and the extraction of wheat from Sicily during the famine of the third Convocation in 1784 and 1785), inspired by a moderate 'vincolismo' (interventionism). Earlier, during his stay in London, Caracciolo published a pamphlet on water shortages in Sicily – published in Westminster in 1763, it was sold on the London market at a lower price than in Lombardy and is now very rare.

== Bibliography ==
- Ernesto Pontieri, Lettere del marchese Caracciolo, viceré di Sicilia, al Ministro Acton (1782–1786), con appendice, Archivio Storico per le Province Napoletane, 1929–1932 (searchable online version)
  - republished in 1932 as Il marchese Caracciolo viceré di Sicilia ed il Ministro Acton. Lettere inedite sul governo di Sicilia (1782–1786)
- Schipa, Michelangelo (1897). Un ministro napoletano del secolo XVIII. Domenico Caracciolo. Naples: Pierro.
- Scibilia, Antonello (1976). "Caracciolo, Domenico". Dizionario Biografico degli Italiani (in Italian). Vol. 19: Cappi–Cardona. Rome: Institute of the Italian Encyclopaedia. ISBN 978-88-12-00032-6.
- Hamel, Pasquale (1995). Il sogno di un illuminista. Domenico Caracciolo viceré di Sicilia. Palermo: La Zisa. ISBN 978-8881280063.
- Renda, Francesco (2010). La grande impresa. Domenico Caracciolo viceré e primo ministro tra Palermo e Napoli. Palermo: Sellerio. ISBN 978-88-389-2491-0.
- Moureau, François (1995). "Exilé dans sa patrie: Caracciolo, vice-roi de Sicile (d'après une correspondence inédite)". In Emanuele Kanceff; Roberta Rampone (eds.). Viaggio nel Sud. Vol. III: Il profondo Sud: Calabria e dintorni. Genève: Slatkine. pp. 211–231.
- Campbell, Angus (2016). Sicily and the Enlightenment: The World of Domenico Carraciolo. London: I.B. Tauris. ISBN 978-1784535759.
