= Basilio Puoti =

Italian literary critic, lexicographer and grammarian

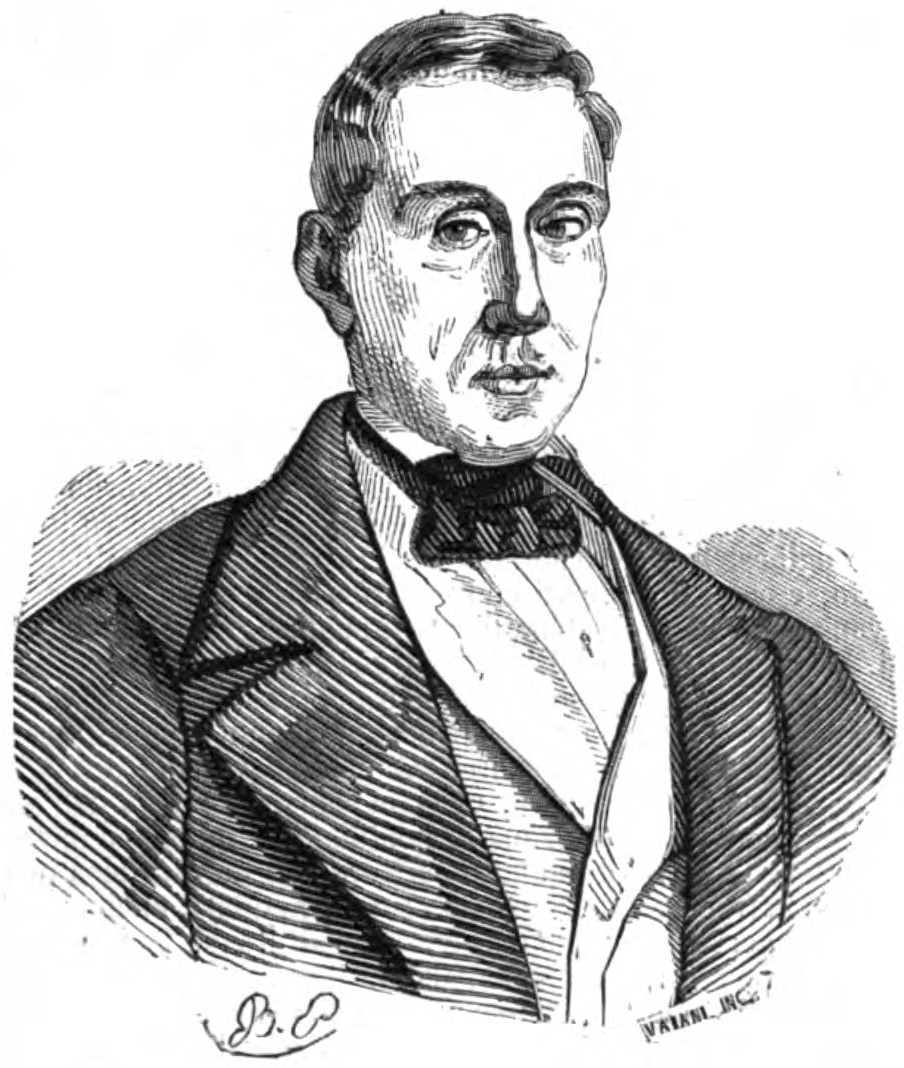
- Engraving of Basilio Puoti
- Born: 27 July 1782; Naples, Kingdom of Naples
- Died: 19 July 1847 (aged 64); Naples, Kingdom of the Two Sicilies
- Occupations: Literary critic; Lexicographer; Grammarian
- Parent(s): Nicola Puoti and Maria Arcangela Puoti (née Palmieri)
- Writing career
- Language: Italian
- Genre: Treatise
- Literary movement: Linguistic purism

Basilio Puoti (27 July 1782, Naples – 19 July 1847, Naples) was an Italian literary critic, lexicographer and grammarian.

== Life ==
Basilio Puoti was born into an old noble family which claimed descent from Adelchi, son of Desiderius. He graduated in jurisprudence in 1809. He became the inspector general of public education for the Kingdom of Two Sicilies and then left that post to set up and teach in an Italian-language school in one of the palazzi in Naples in 1825. Its students included Giacinto de' Sivo, Luigi Settembrini and Francesco De Sanctis.

He opposed all the "barbari" (barbarians) or Romantic poets except Alessandro Manzoni, whose nationalist sentiments he shared. Puoti was instead a purist, more open regarding the Italian lexicon but advocating strict imitation of 15th and 16th century models when it came to style. He translated Greek and Latin and was a member of the Accademia della Crusca.

== Selected works ==
- Regole elementari della lingua italiana (1 ed.). Naples. 1833.
- Dello studio delle scienze e delle lettere. Naples: Stamperia del Fibreno. 1833.
- Della maniera di studiare la lingua e l'eloquenza italiana. Libri due. Naples: da Raffaele de Stefano e socii. 1837.
- Vocabolario domestico napoletano-toscano. Naples: Libreria e tipografia simoniana. 1841.
- L'arte di scrivere in prosa per esempii e per teoriche. Naples: Tipografia all'insegna di Diogene. 1843–1845.
- Dizionario dei francesismi. Naples: Tipografia all'insegna di Diogene. 1845.

== Bibliography ==
- La giovinezza di Francesco De Sanctis, autobiographical fragment published by Pasquale Villari, Morano, Napoli 1924.
- Baldacchini, S. (1866). "Di Basilio Puoti e della lingua italiana". Rendiconti dell'Accademia di Archeologia, Lettere e Belle Arti. II: 89–148.

== External links (in Italian) ==
- Scheda (online) del Sistema Bibliotecario Nazionale
- Covino, Sandra (2016). "PUOTI, Basilio". Dizionario Biografico degli Italiani (in Italian). Vol. 85: Ponzone–Quercia. Rome: Istituto dell'Enciclopedia Italiana. ISBN 978-88-12-00032-6.
- "Basilio Puoti e il Purismo dal web del Comune di Napoli". Archived from the original on 23 February 2005.
- "Il purismo e Puoti" (in Italian). Archived from the original on 20 January 2005.
