= Secretary of State of the Kingdoms of Naples and Sicily =

Head of government

- Kingdom of Naples and Kingdom of Sicily
- Seat: Naples
- Appointer: King of Naples and Sicily
- Formation: 1734
- First holder: Manuel de Benavides
- Final holder: John Acton
- Abolished: 1804
- Superseded by: President of the Council of Ministers of the Kingdom of the Two Sicilies (from 1816)

The Secretary of State of the Kingdoms of Naples and Sicily was the Prime Minister of these two Kingdoms from 1734 to 1804, when both were under Spanish Bourbon rule in a personal union.

== Role ==
The office of Secretary of State involved the exercise of executive power for the Kingdoms of Naples and Sicily (two autonomous kingdoms in personal union). Formally, the Secretary of State was appointed by the King, who, concentrating all the powers of an absolute monarch, had the right to replace him whenever he deemed it appropriate.

The Secretariat of State of Naples and Sicily was modeled on the Spanish "Secretaría del Despacho Universal" and, therefore, usually consisted of four ministers:

- Secretary of State;
- Secretary of Finance;
- Secretary of Justice;
- Secretary of War and Navy.

In Sicily, there were also the executive offices of:

- Viceroy of Sicily;
- President of the Kingdom, who presided over the Sicilian Parliament.

The post of Secretary of State was abolished under pressure of France, shortly before Naples was conquered in 1806, and the Napoleonic Kingdom of Naples was established. After the end of the Napoleonic Wars, a new function, similar to that held by the Secretaries of State, was created in 1816 called President of the Council of Ministers of the Kingdom of the Two Sicilies. .

== List of secretaries ==
The following is a list of the seven Secretaries of State of the Kingdoms of Naples and Sicily :

No.	Secretary of state	Term		King of Naples King of Sicily
No.	Secretary of state	Start	End	King of Naples King of Sicily
1	Manuel de Benavides y Aragón (1682–1748)	29 April 1734	24 August 1738	Charles VII of Naples; 1716–1788
2	José Joaquín Guzmán de Montealegre (1698–1771)	25 August 1738	29 April 1746	Charles VII of Naples; 1716–1788
3	Giovanni Fogliani Sforza d'Aragona (1697–1780)	17 June 1746	6 October 1755	Charles VII of Naples; 1716–1788
4	Bernardo Tanucci (1698–1783)	6 October 1755	6 October 1759	Charles VII of Naples; 1716–1788
4	Bernardo Tanucci (1698–1783)	6 October 1759	29 October 1776	Ferdinand IV of Naples; 1751–1825
5	Giuseppe Beccadelli di Bologna (1726–1813)	29 October 1776	18 January 1786	Ferdinand IV of Naples; 1751–1825
6	Domenico Caracciolo (1715–1789)	18 January 1786	16 July 1789 †	Ferdinand IV of Naples; 1751–1825
7	John Acton (1736–1811)	16 July 1789	10 May 1804	Ferdinand IV of Naples; 1751–1825
