= Caterina de San Marco =

Italian courtier and advisor (1747–1824)

Caterina de San Marco (1747–1824) was an Italian courtier, a confidant and adviser of the de facto ruler and queen of Naples, Maria Carolina of Austria. She was also a known natural scientist and participated in politics several times during the reign of the queen and during the Parthenopean Republic.

== Early life ==
She was born to Prince Michele Ottaiano de Medici and Carmela Filomarino, sister of Giuseppe de' Medici and Luigi de' Medici, and married Troiano Onero Caviniglia, Duke di Dan Giovanni Rotondo and Marquis di San Marco (1707-1780), in 1767.

== Lady-in-waiting ==
Caterina de San Marco was appointed lady-in-waiting to Queen Maria Carolina. From 1770, she had a relationship with the Austrian envoy Ernst Christoph von Kaunitz-Rietberg, and was at one point one of the lovers of the king.

She was a personal confidante and influential favorite of the queen. They were both members of the Freemason adoptive lodge Saint Jean du Secret et de la Parfaite Amitié and used to visit it and participate in their ceremonies together.

She was known to have influence in state affairs, and used her influence in several occasions. In 1776, she successfully intervened in the Affaire Pallante in favor of Sir John Acton, 6th Baronet and her brother Luigi de' Medici. When her brother Luigi lost his office and was trialed as a republican in 1795, she again intervened in his behalf: reportedly, it was here influence as a favorite of the queen which resulted in his relatively light sentence.

Being a sympathizer of the Enlightenment, she had contacts with reformers and Annibale Giordano was her teacher in mathematics - she became known as a supporter of the aristocratic liberal republicans in the 1790s, and used her influence at court to defend them from persecution. Her sympathies did not endanger her position with the queen: in 1797, she was promoted to Cameriera Maggiore (Mistress of the Robes) and head of the queen's court.

She was the anonymous author of the Histoire - Jouis saint depuis long temps douceurs de l'amitié si rarement senties pres du throne.
