= Bernardino Larghi =

Italian surgeon

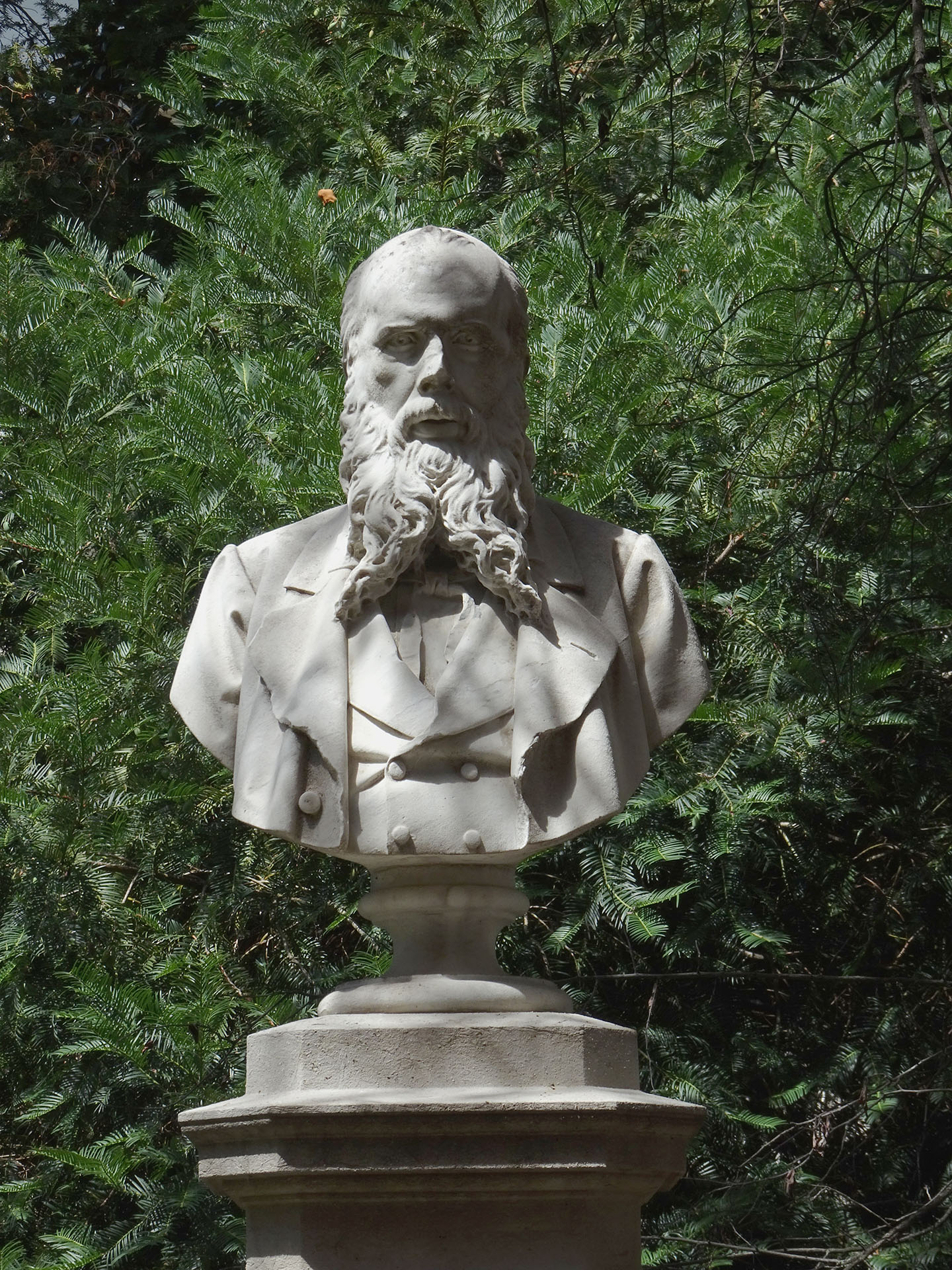

Eusebio Bernardino Larghi (27 February 1812 – 2 January 1877) was an Italian surgeon who was a pioneer of bone surgeries. He developed techniques for the removal of fragments of bone, so as to allow regeneration, and the use of silver nitrate to cauterize infected tissue. He also designed surgical instruments for sectioning bones in-situ.

== Biography ==
Larghi was born in Vercelli to Francesco and Maria Giudice. After studies in medicine at the Universities of Turin and Genoa, he began practice in his home. He joined the Maggiore hospital in 1838 and was made chief surgeon in 1844, serving there until 1860. He examined the writings of surgeon Michele Troja, who noted the regeneration of bone tissue at site. In 1852, Larghi was able to prevent necrosis to the lower jaw of a patient by the removal of tissue using specially designed surgical instruments.

When he retired from work, he was reduced to poverty after being involved in a legal case after a brother died in debt.
