= Ruggero Bonghi =

Italian politician (1826–1895)

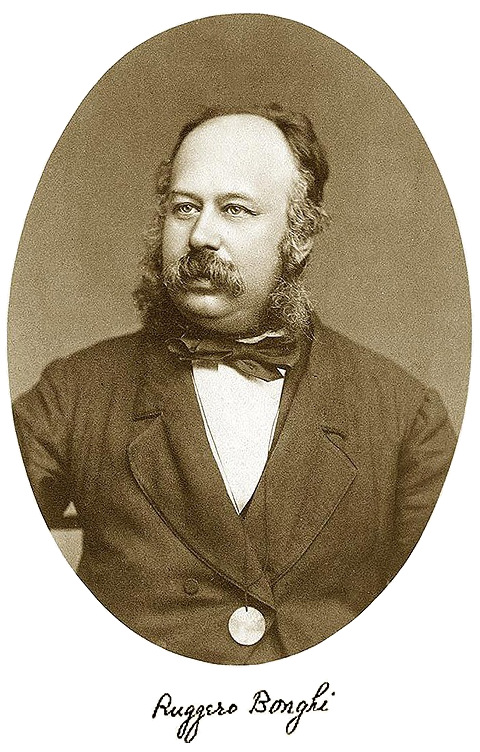
Ruggero Bonghi, ca. 1875

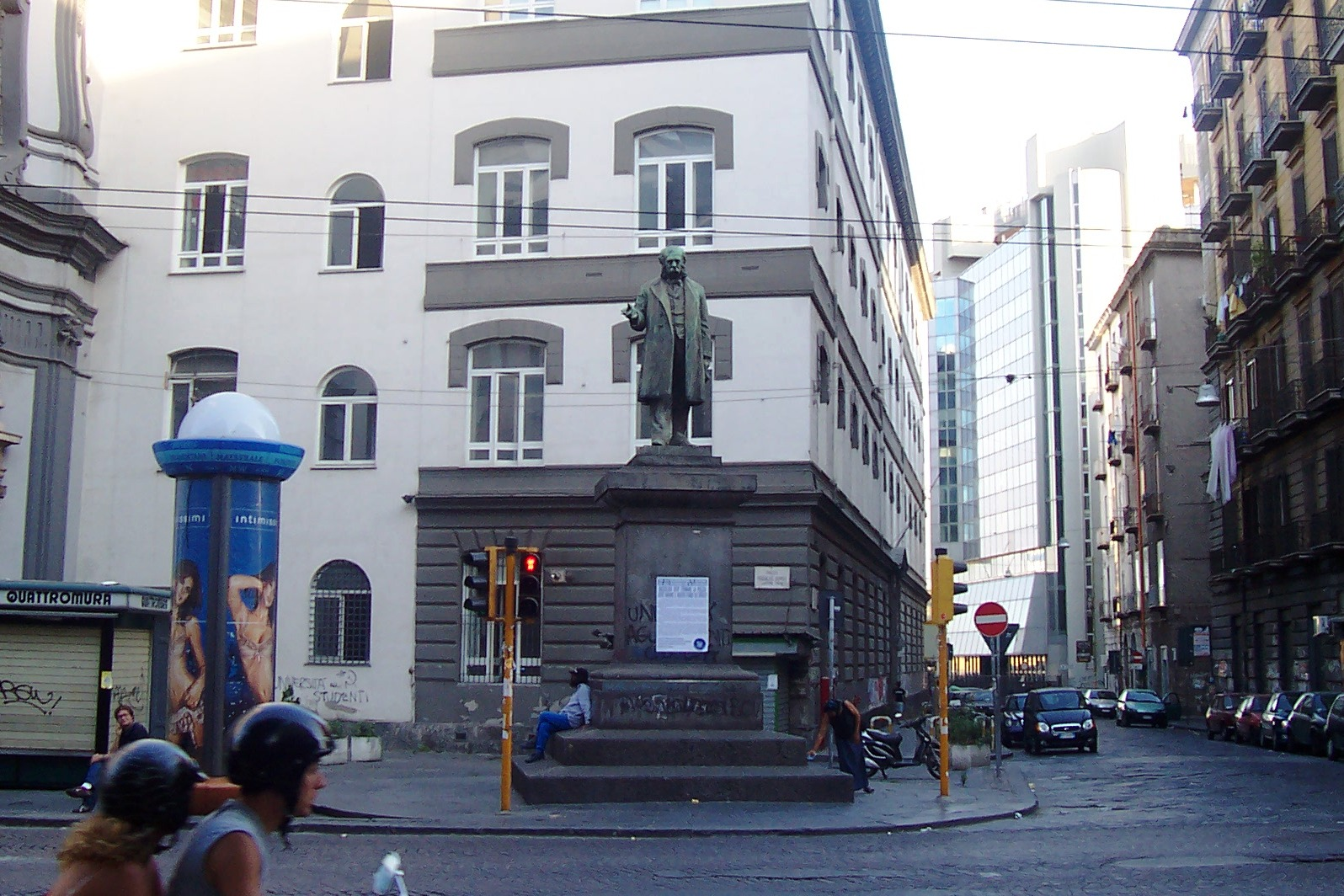
Bronze statue of Bonghi (1900), at Corso Umberto I and Via Porto di Massa, in front of San Pietro Martire, Naples

Ruggero Bonghi (20 March 1826 – 22 October 1895) was an Italian scholar, writer and politician.

Ruggero Bonghi was born in Naples and after being widowed his mother remarried in 1840 to Saverio Baldacchini, a major influence on Bonghi. Exiled from his native city in consequence of the movement of 1848, he took refuge in Tuscany, whence he was compelled to flee to Turin on account of a pungent article against the Bourbons. At Turin he resumed his philosophic studies and his translation of Plato, but in 1858 refused a professorship of Greek at Pavia, under the Austrian government, only to accept it in 1859 from the Italian government after the liberation of Lombardy.

In 1860, with the Cavour party, he opposed the work of Giuseppe Garibaldi, Francesco Crispi and Agostino Bertani at Naples. He became secretary of Luigi Carlo Farini, during the latter's lieutenancy, but in 1865 assumed contemporaneously the editorship of the Perseveranza of Milan and the chair of Latin literature at Florence. Elected deputy in 1860 he became celebrated by the biting wit of his speeches, while, as journalist, the acrimony of his polemical writings made him a redoubtable adversary. Though an ardent supporter of the historic right, and, as such, entrusted by the Lanza cabinet with the defence of the Law of Guarantees in 1870; his caustic tongue did not spare friend nor foe.

Appointed minister for public instruction in 1873, he feverishly reformed the Italian educational system, suppressed the privileges of the University of Naples, founded the Vittorio Emanuele library in Rome, and prevented the establishment of a Catholic university in the capital. Upon the fall of the Right from power, in 1876 he joined the opposition, and, with characteristic vivacity, protracted during two months the debate on Baccellis University Reform Bill, single-handedly securing its rejection. A bitter critic of King Humbert, both in the Perseveranza and in the Nuova Antologia, he was, in 1893, excluded from court, only securing readmission shortly before his death.

In foreign policy a Francophile, he opposed the Triple Alliance, and took considerable part in the organization of the inter-parliamentary peace conference.
