= President of the Council of Ministers of the Kingdom of the Two Sicilies =

Head of government

- Kingdom of the Two Sicilies
- Seat: Naples
- Appointer: King of the Two Sicilies
- Precursor: Secretary of State of the Kingdoms of Naples and Sicily
- Formation: 1816
- First holder: Luigi de' Medici
- Final holder: Pietro Calà Ulloa
- Abolished: 1861
- Superseded by: President of the Council of Ministers of the Kingdom of Italy

The Presidents of the Council of Ministers of the Kingdom of the Two Sicilies, served successively from 1816 to 1861 and were 16 individuals who presided over a total of 20 governments; a 21st government, the provisional junta, was not led by any President.

== History ==
Officially the first president was Luigi de' Medici, in office when in December 1816 the Kingdom of Naples and the Kingdom of Sicily were formally unified into the Kingdom of the Two Sicilies.

== List of presidents ==
Party or placement

Moderate Party
Murat
Military

No.	President of the Council	Term		Party	King of the Two Sicilies
No.	President of the Council	Start	End	Party	King of the Two Sicilies
1	Donato Tommasi (1761–1831)	January 1815	4 June 1815	–	Ferdinand I 1759–1825
2	Tommaso di Somma (1737–1826)	4 June 1815	27 June 1816	–	Ferdinand I 1759–1825
3	Luigi de' Medici (1759–1830)	27 June 1816	9 July 1820	–	Ferdinand I 1759–1825
-	Vacant	13 July 1820	March 1821	–	Ferdinand I 1759–1825
(2)	Tommaso di Somma (1737–1826)	March 1821	June 1822	–	Ferdinand I 1759–1825
(3)	Luigi de' Medici (1759–1830)	June 1822	25 January 1830 †	–	Ferdinand I 1759–1825
(1)	Donato Tommasi (1761–1831)	25 January 1830	11 March 1831	–	Francis I 1825–1830
4	Carlo Avarna (1757–1836)	19 March 1831	18 May 1836 †	–	Ferdinand II; 1830–1859
5	Girolamo Ruffo (1771–1839)	18 May 1836	29 November 1839 †	–	Ferdinand II; 1830–1859
6	Giuseppe Ceva Grimaldi (1777–1862)	14 January 1840	27 January 1848	–	Ferdinand II; 1830–1859
7	Nicola Maresca Donnorso di Serracapriola (1790–1870)	27 January 1848	3 April 1848	–	Ferdinand II; 1830–1859
8	Carlo Troya (1784–1858)	3 April 1848	15 May 1848	Moderate	Ferdinand II; 1830–1859
9	Gennaro Spinelli (1780–1851)	15 May 1848	7 August 1849	Murat (conservative)	Ferdinand II; 1830–1859
10	Giustino Fortunato (1777–1862)	8 August 1849	18 January 1852	Murat (conservative)	Ferdinand II; 1830–1859
11	Ferdinando Troya (1786–1861)	18 January 1852	7 June 1859	–	Ferdinand II; 1830–1859
12	Carlo Filangieri (1784–1867)	7 June 1859	16 March 1860	Murat	Francis II; 1859–1861
13	Antonio Statella di Cassaro (1785–1864)	16 March 1860	25 June 1860	–	Francis II; 1859–1861
14	Antonio Spinelli di Scalea (1795–1884)	25 June 1860	7 September 1860	–	Francis II; 1859–1861
15	Francesco Angelo Casella (1819–1894)	7 September 1860	November 1860	Military	Francis II; 1859–1861
16	Pietro Calà Ulloa (1801–1879)	November 1860	13 February 1861	–	Francis II; 1859–1861
16	Pietro Calà Ulloa (1801–1879)	13 February 1861	20 September 1870	–	Francis II; 1859–1861
