= Sicilian Constitution of 1848 =

The Sicilian Constitution of 1848 was the constitution adopted during the Sicilian revolution of 1848 by the newly proclaimed Kingdom of Sicily.

Inspired by the British constitution, it was considered a very liberal constitution for its time with Article 87 prescribing that in cases of illegal detention “Every one has the right to resist a public officer who may wish to arrest him or to commit violence upon him by deeds or threats.” Its duration, however, was limited: the constitution's effect ended with the reconquering of Sicily by the army of Ferdinand II of the Two Sicilies in May 1849.

== The promulgation ==
King Ferdinand, in an attempt to curb the Sicilian Revolution of 1848, on 10 February promulgated the statute of 1812, which he himself repealed.

But a new constitution, which only resumed in part that of 1812, was issued on July 10, 1848 by the general parliament of Sicily, presided over by Vincenzo Fardella di Torrearsa under the name of Fundamental Statute of the Kingdom of Sicily, was therefore voted and not obtuse (i.e. It " laid the foundations for making Sicily a sovereign, free and independent state"

== Principles ==
For the first time, both chambers become elective (of deputies and senators).

These are the most important principles:

- The king of the Sicilians will not be able to rule or rule over any other country.
- All citizens who have turned 21 and who can read and write are voters.
- For each municipality of 6,000 inhabitants, a deputy will be chosen while the senators will be 120.
- The law made by parliament will be in the space of thirty days promulgated by the king, or with special observations sent back to parliament.
- Executive power will be exercised by the king through the ministers responsible for his appointment. No act of the king shall be valid unless countersigned by at least one minister.
- The word and the press are free.
- Teaching is free. The public teaching will be free of charge and regulated by a special law.
- No rule of the Statute may be amended without the assistance of two thirds of the votes present in each Chamber.
- A special title of the Constitution lists citizens' rights.
