= Melchiorre Delfico (caricaturist) =

Italian artist and musician

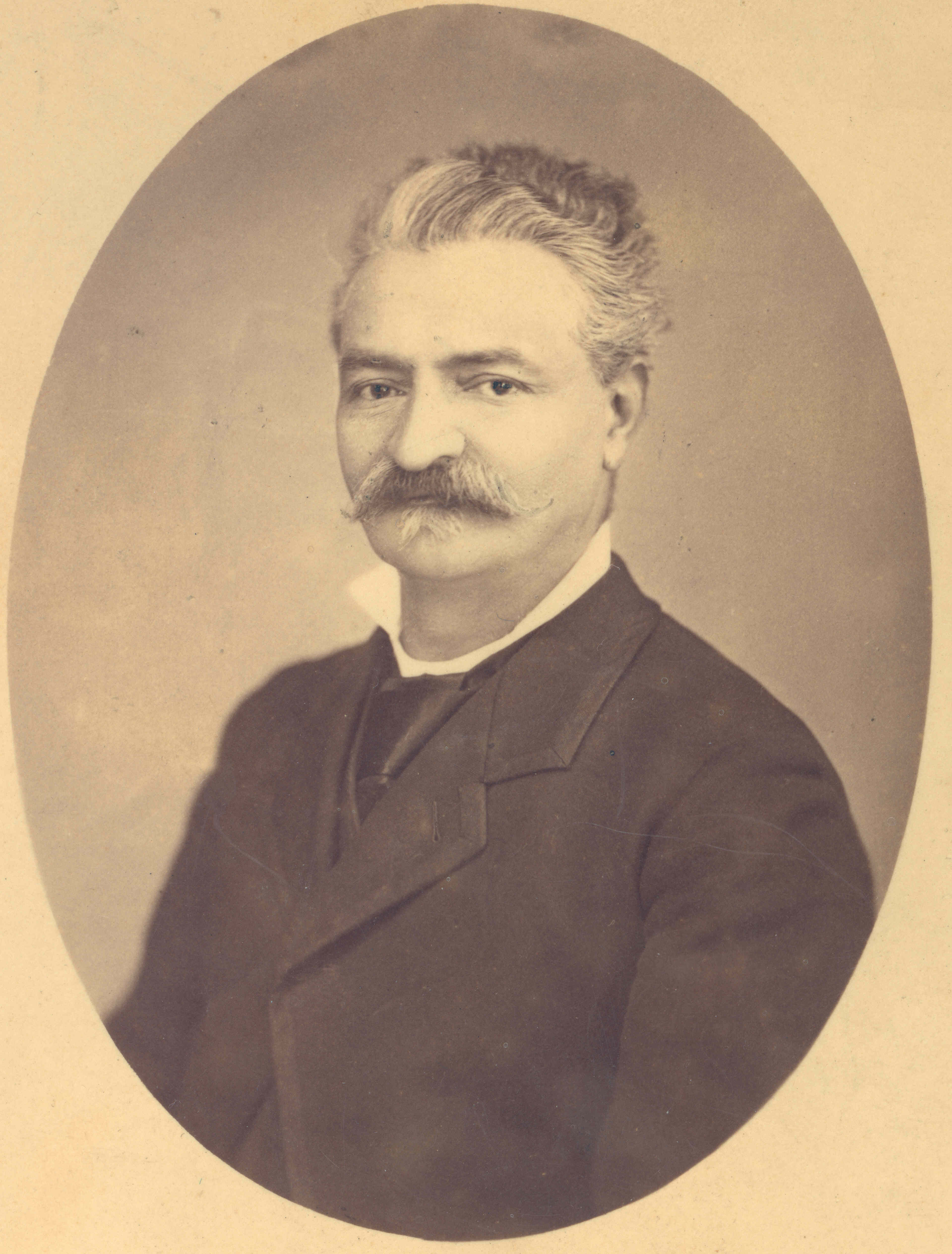
Melchiorre Delfico

Baron Melchiorre De Filippis Delfico (1825 – 22 December 1895) was an Italian artist, composer, singer, conductor, writer, librettist and a master of the Neapolitan art of caricature who inspired, among others, Carlo Pellegrini.

Melchiorre Delfico, the 'Prince of Caricaturists', is best remembered today for his caricatures of notable personalities, both in his native Italy and later in England, where he worked under the name 'Delfico' for Vanity Fair, a society magazine. Among the many characters portrayed by Delfico's agile and ironic pen were emperors, nobles and prelates, artists and critics from the world of opera and theatre, and above all his great friend Giuseppe Verdi, who knew him as a musician but who also enjoyed his caricatures.

== Biography ==
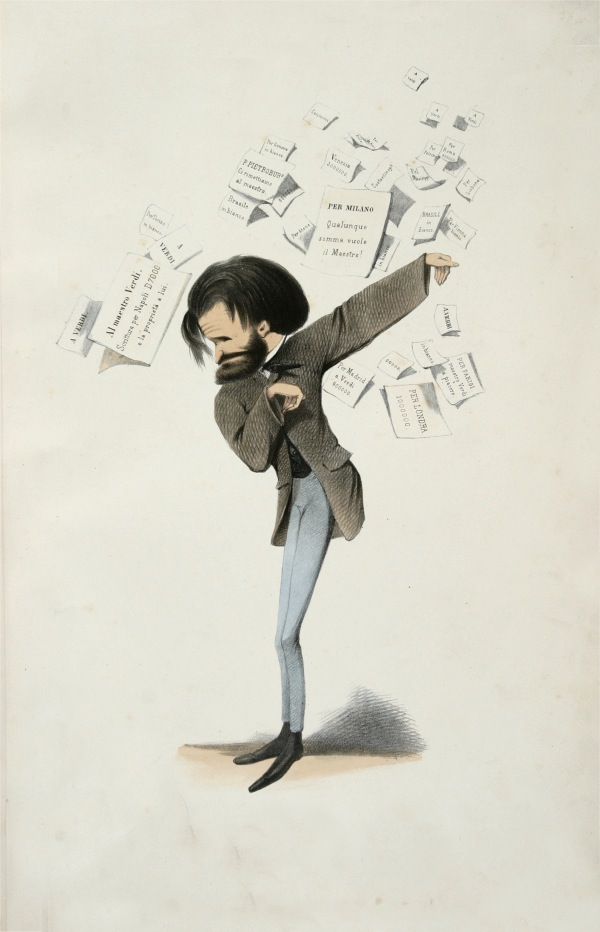
Giuseppe Verdi caricatured by Delfico (1860)

One of nine children born to Gregorio and Marina De Filippis Delfico, the Delficos were an aristocratic family from Teramo in Italy. In his autobiography, Delfico says that as a child he was taught the liberal arts, learning music from the age of seven. Also according to the autobiography, in 1835, then 10 years, he discovered a "penchant for caricature." In 1839, at age 14, he commenced the formal study of Art in Teramo under Pasquale Della Monica.

In 1841, aged 16, Delfico moved to Naples to commence his studies in the Humanities under the guidance of the renowned professor and Latin poet Antonio Mirabelli. At this time the young Delfico began writing poetry and painting, but his great love was music. In 1844 he composed his first musical work, The Jailer of 1793, to a libretto by Domenico Bolognese. In the summer of 1845 this was staged at the Teatro Nuovo. In 1847 Delfico's father died.

According to his autobiography, from 1847 Delfico had already begun to sell his cartoons, often receiving a request from a client who wished to be caricatured. But at this time caricature was still a hobby for Delfico, and probably the idea of turning it into an opportunity to earn a living pulled against his aristocratic upbringing, despite the fact that he actually needed the money to support himself. He published his first printed caricature in 1855 in an Italian pictorial publication named Omnibus, founded by the journalist and critic Vincenzo Torelli. Delfico composed and staged two further plays at this time, The Husband of One Hour in 1850, and The Board of Recruiters of 1853.

Delfico first met the composer Giuseppe Verdi in 1857 when he visited Naples for the staging of Simon Boccanegra. Delfico's uncle, Baron Genovese, was a passionate music lover, a good singer and a great friend of Verdi's, and he presented his nephew to the composer; from that meeting onwards Delfico became a close friend of Verdi's, immortalising him in cartoons and caricatures. The 1860s and 1870s were a period of great artistic creativity for Delfico, who published many caricatures and albums of caricatures. It is claimed that in the 1860s he moved to London and worked for Punch magazine, but no evidence has been found to support this claim.

Delfico produced caricatures for Vanity Fair, a British society magazine, in the early 1870s. However, later in the 1870s his interest in caricature decreased, and he returned to a professional career in music as a conductor, and at one time appeared as a tenor to save a musical season that had been threatened with ruin. During this period he wrote the libretto and score for two comic operas, The Master Bombardone (1870) and The Return to Paris After the War (1872), as well as two musicals, The Fair and The Lightning (1876), his last musical work.

Delfico's biographers tell us that during his later years his life was marked by a deep melancholy and infinite sadness following the death in September 1884 of his eldest son John in his early twenties, and his daughter Bianca aged just eight years, both to the cholera which scourged Naples at that time. In December 1889 his young wife Concetta Sposito also died, leaving him with a brood of children, some of whom were still quite young. A document of the Royal Confraternity of the Immaculate Conception in Portsmouth dated 22 November 1891 shows that Melchiorre Delfico contributed £150 to the cost of the construction of niches in the chapel for the future burial of himself and his family.

Melchiorre Delfico died on 22 December 1895 in Portsmouth, England.

His uncle was the economist Melchiorre Delfico.

== Gallery ==
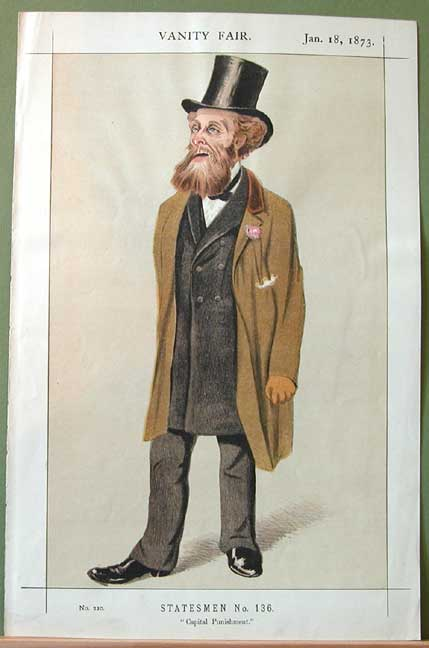
Charles Gilpin (politician)

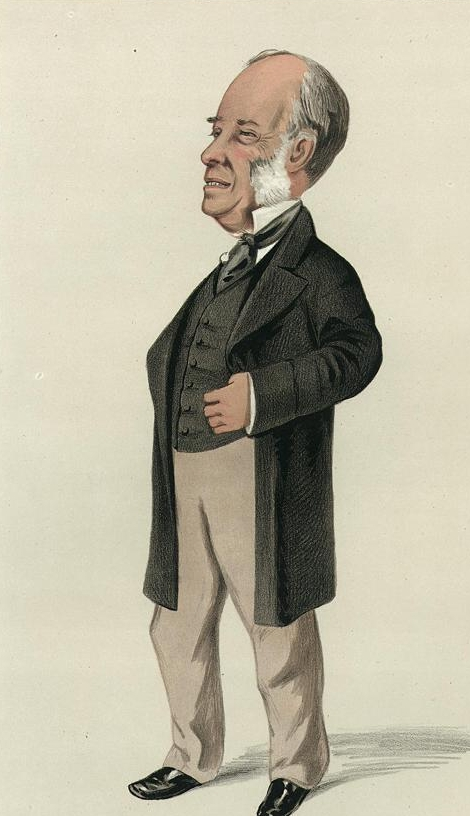
Sir Gabriel Goldney, 1st Baronet

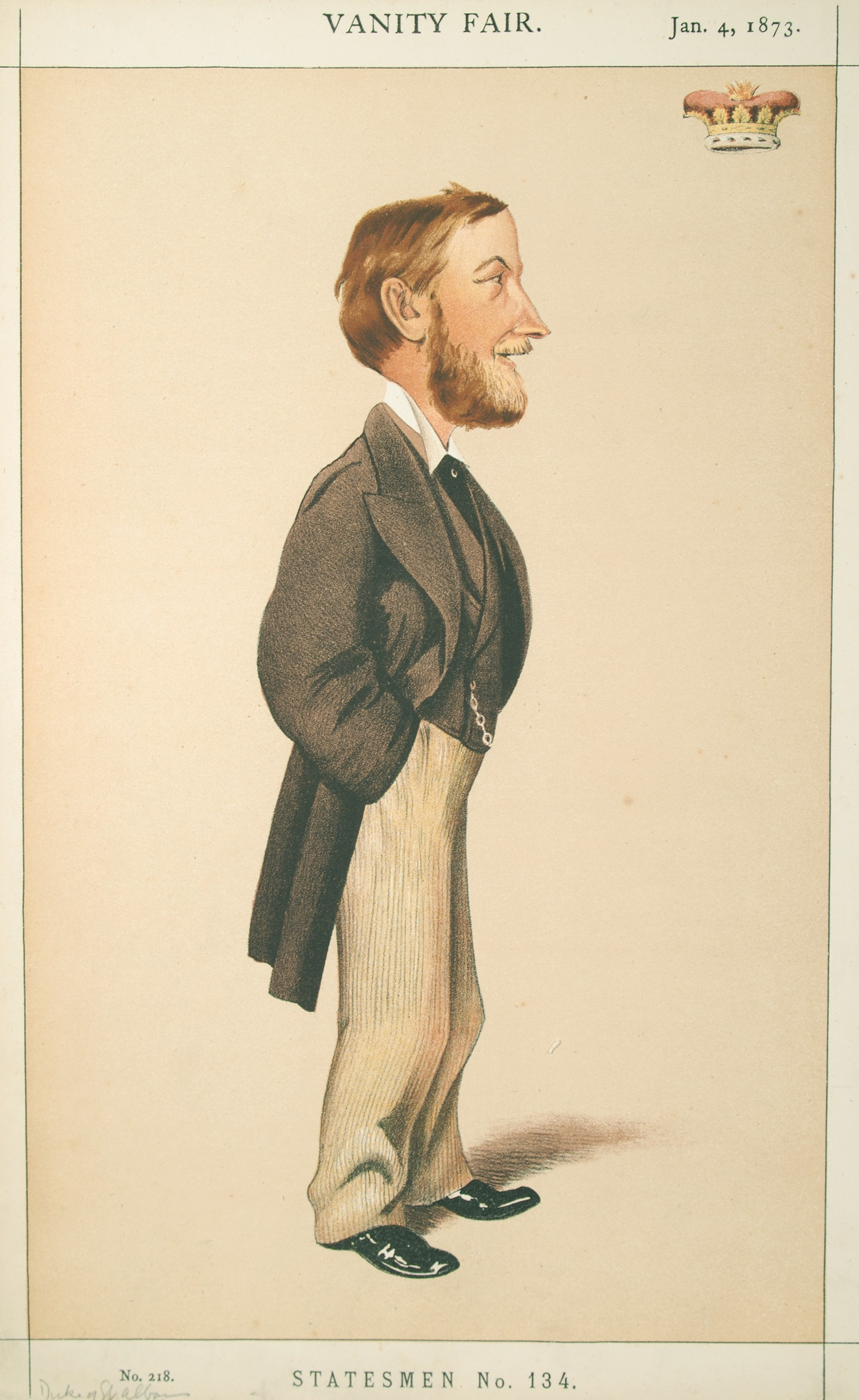
William Beauclerk, 10th Duke of St Albans

== Albums of caricatures ==
- Il Carnevale del 1861
- Mondo vecchio. Mondo nuovo, Album di caricature in 24 tavole, litografie a colori, 1861
- Album Per Ridere, 1869
- Strenna dello Stenterello, 1874
- Pompei, 1891

== Bibliography ==
- Andrea Sessa, Il Melodramma Italiano 1861-1900. Dizionario bio-bibliografico dei compositori, Firenze, Olschki, 2003, p. 158 - ISBN 88-222-5213-6
- Raffaele Aurini, De Filippis Dèlfico Melchiorre, in Dizionario bibliografico della gente d'Abruzzo, vol.I, Teramo, Ars et Labor, 1952 e Nuova edizione ampliata, Colledara, Teramo, Andromeda editrice, 2002, vol.II, pp. 282–286;
- Fabia Borroni, Melchiorre Dèlfico Caricaturista, Milano, Sansoni antiquariato, 1957;
- Mostra Retrospettiva del Caricaturista e Musicista Melchiorre De Filippis Dèlfico (1825-1895), Teramo, Edigrafital, 1971;
- C. Garzya Romano e M. Bucarelli, De Filippis Dèlfico Melchiorre, in Dizionario biografico degli italiani, Roma, Treccani, vol. 33, 1987, pp. 761–762;
- Fernando Aurini, Melchiorre De Filippis Dèlfico. Grande maestro della caricatura ed originale caricatura di musicista al di fuori di ogni schematismo, in "Notizie dell'economia teramana", Teramo, a. XLV, settembre-dicembre 1993, pp. 81–88;
- E. Panetta, Melchiorre De Filippis Dèlfico e la Caricatura Napoletana del XIX secolo nella collezione Lucchesi Palli di Napoli, Tesi di laurea, Facoltà di lettere. Conservazione dei beni culturali, Istituto Universitario Suor Orsola Benincasa di Napoli, 12 marzo 2003.
