= Bernardo Tanucci =

Italian statesman (1698–1783)

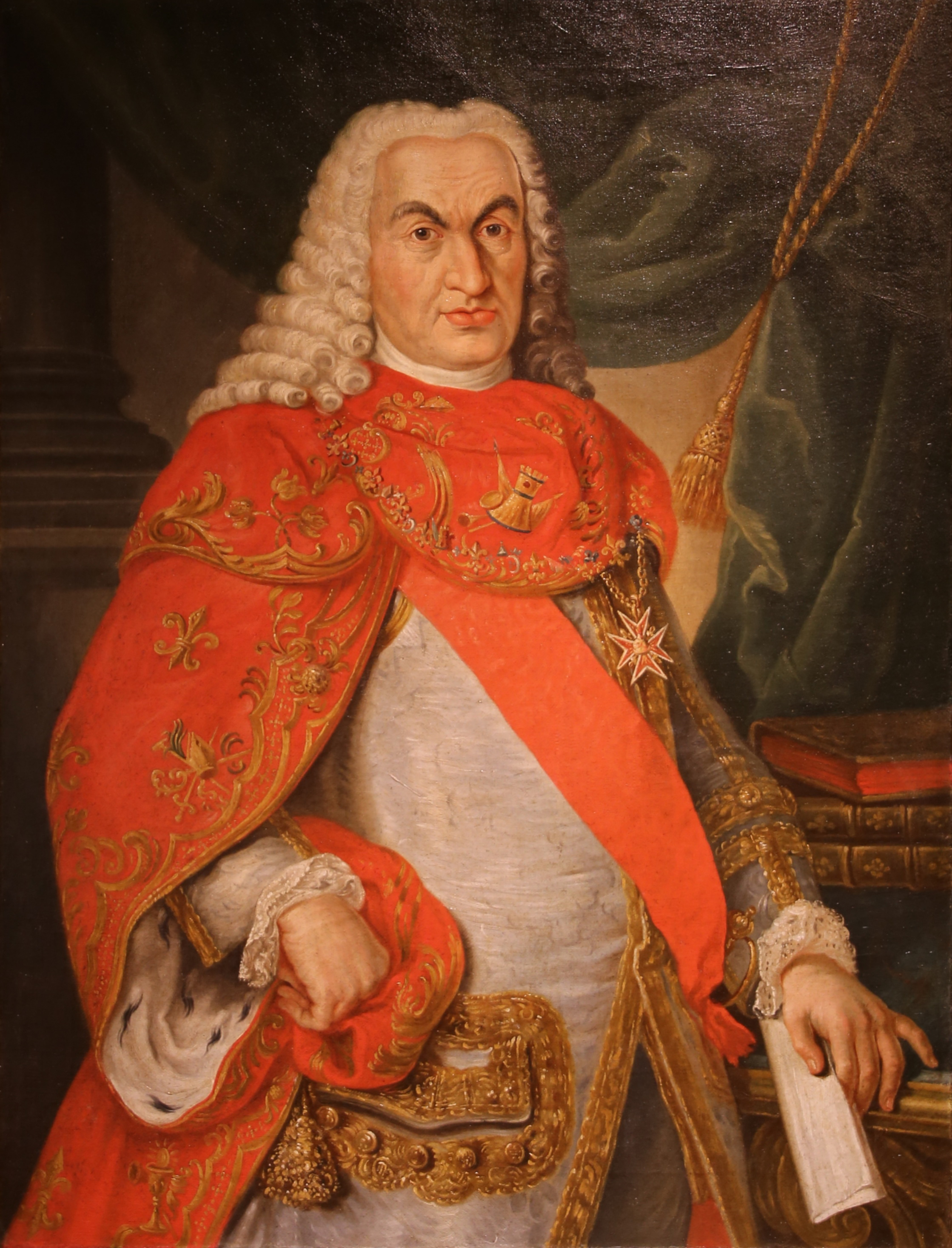
- Portrait of Bernardo Tanucci by Nicola Matraini, 1738 (Palazzo alla Giornata, Pisa)

Prime Minister
- In office 6 October 1754 – 29 October 1776
- Monarchs: Charles VII of Naples; Ferdinand IV of Naples
- Preceded by: Giovanni Fogliani Sforza d'Aragona
- Succeeded by: Giuseppe Beccadelli di Bologna

Personal details
- Born: 20 February 1698 Stia, near Arezzo Grand Duchy of Tuscany
- Died: 29 April 1783 (aged 85) Naples, Kingdom of Naples
- Spouse: Ricciarda Catanti
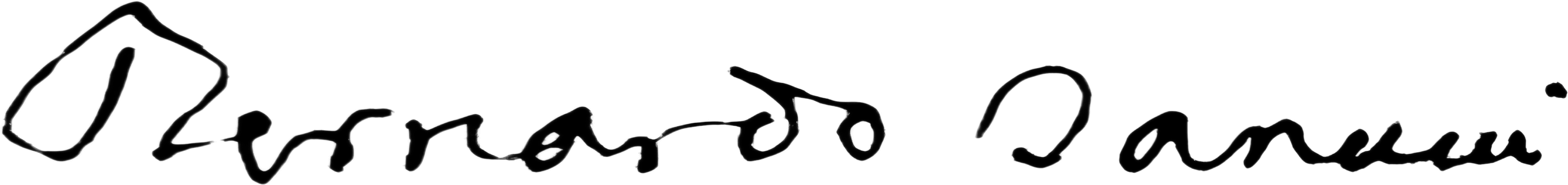
- Signature

Academic background
- Education: University of Pisa

Academic work
- Discipline: Roman Law
- Institutions: University of Pisa

Bernardo Tanucci (20 February 1698 – 29 April 1783) was an Italian jurist and statesman, who brought an enlightened absolutism style of government to the Kingdom of Naples (later Kingdom of the Two Sicilies) for Charles III and his son Ferdinand IV.

== Biography ==
=== Early years ===
Bernardo Tanucci, son of Giuliano Tanucci (who was the son of Bernardo, son of Giuliano Tanucci senior), from Stia in Casentino, and of Lucrezia di Andrea Tommasi, from Strada in Casentino was born on 20 February 1698 in Stia, near Arezzo (Tuscany). Tanucci was not from a wealthy family and thus was educated, thanks to a patron, at the University of Pisa. Tanucci was appointed a professor of law there in 1725 and attracted attention by his defence of the authenticity of the Codex Pisanus of the Pandects of Justinian. When Charles, Duke of Parma, son of Philip V of Spain, who succeeded him as monarch and became Charles III, passed through Tuscany on his way to conquer the Kingdom of Naples, Cosimo III de' Medici, Grand Duke of Tuscany, encouraged him to take Tanucci with him.

Tanucci married Donna Ricciarda, daughter of Conte Giovanni Catanti, a Pisan nobleman. The marriage took place in Pisa, in the church of Santa Cecilia, the bride's parish, on 18 April 1740. The wedding was celebrated by proxy, since Tanucci had been, at the time and for a long time, in Naples, in the service of the Bourbons.

He and his wife had two children: Giulio Tanucci (died 17 April 1744 aged 3 months) and Marianna Tanucci (died 20 August 1781), wife of Giuseppe Rossi, a Pisan not of noble ancestry.

In Naples, Charles appointed Tanucci councilor of state, then superintendent of posts, minister of justice in 1752, foreign minister in 1754 and finally prime minister and a marquis.

=== Prime Minister ===
As Secretary of State (Prime minister), Tanucci was most zealous regalist in establishing the supremacy of a modernized State over the Catholic Church, and in abolishing the feudal privileges of Papacy and the nobility in the Kingdom of the Two Sicilies. Governing under the principles of enlightened absolutism, he restricted the jurisdiction of the bishops, eliminated medieval privilege, and closed convents and monasteries, and reduced the taxes to be forwarded to the pontifical Curia. These reforms were sanctioned in a Concordat signed with the Papacy in 1741, the application of which, however, went far beyond the intentions of the Holy See.

For the reform of the laws Tanucci instituted a commission of learned jurists with instructions to create a new legal code, the Codice Carolino, which was, however, not put into force. When Charles of Naples became Charles III of Spain in 1759, Tanucci was made president of the council of regency instituted for the nine-year-old Ferdinand IV, who even when he reached his majority preferred to leave the government in Tanucci's hands, constantly overseen from Spain by Charles III.

In foreign affairs, Tanucci kept Naples out of wars and entanglements, though in 1742 an English fleet off the coast helped ensure Neapolitan neutrality in the war between Spain and Austria. Following the discovery of the Herculaneum papyri in 1752, per the advice from Bernardo, King Charles VII of Naples established a commission to study them.

Tanucci worked at establishing for Bourbon Naples the kind of controls over the church that were effected by the Gallican church in Bourbon France: revenues of vacant bishoprics and abbeys went to the crown, superfluous convents were suppressed, tithes abolished and the acquisition of new Church property by mortmain was forbidden. Royal assent was required for the publication in Naples of papal bulls and concessions were no longer considered eternal. The status of Naples as a papal fief, dating from the time of the Hohenstaufen, was denied: the king of Naples served at the pleasure of God only. Appeals to Rome were forbidden without the royal permission. Marriage was declared a civil contract. And by the order of Charles III the Jesuits were suppressed and expelled from the Kingdom of Naples in 1767, a move in which Tanucci was in general sympathy with other ministers at the Bourbon courts, as Aranda in Spain, Choiseul in France, du Tillot in Parma, and also with Pombal in Portugal.

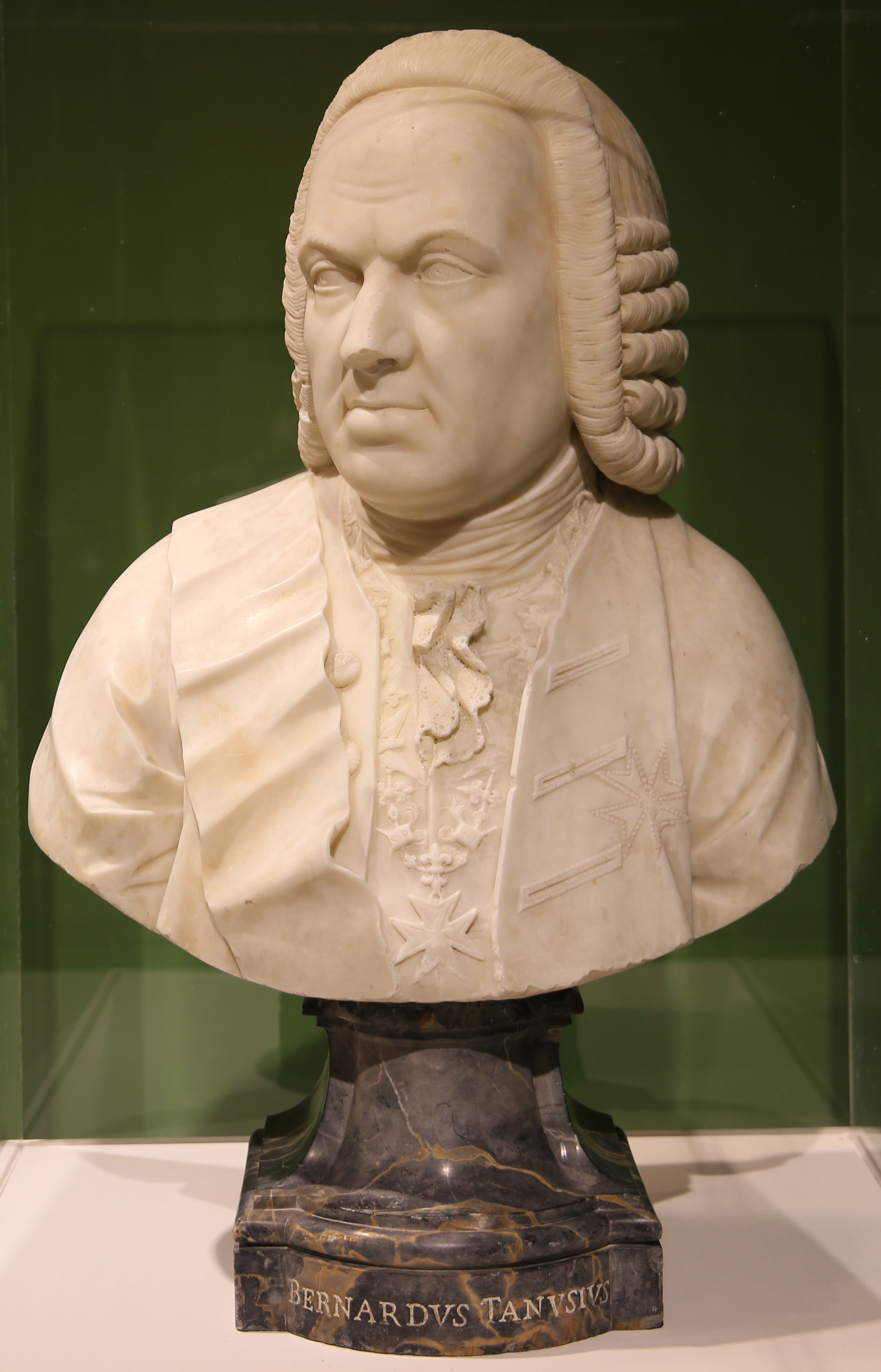
Bust of Bernardo Tanucci by Giovanni Antonio Cybei, 1776 (Royal Palace of Caserta)

Pope Clement XIII responded with excommunication, whereupon Tanucci occupied the cities of Benevento and Pontecorvo (enclaves of the Papal States in the Kingdom of Naples), which were not returned to the Roman Church until after the pope's general order of dissolution of the Society of Jesus in 1773. The protests of the bishops against many of the new teachings in the schools after the expulsion of the Jesuits were dismissed as invalid. His policy in finance and in regard to the food taxes provoked popular revolutions on several occasions.

=== Decline and later years ===
When, in 1774, Maria Carolina of Austria, the Habsburg queen of Ferdinand IV, joined the Council of State, the power of Tanucci began to decline. In vain he endeavored to neutralize the queen's influence, but in 1777 he was dismissed and retired. He died in Naples on the 29th of April 1783 and was buried in the Basilica of San Giovanni Battista dei Fiorentini.

On April 26, 1783, Tanucci made his will. In 1779, he had lost his only sister, Maddalena. Since his only surviving daughter, Marianna, had died in 1781, his legatees were his wife Donna Ricciarda Catanti (who inherited the Neapolitan assets), Pasquale Ciarpaglini, son of Maddalena (who received the Pisan properties), his great-nephew Vittorio Poltri, son of Ciarpaglini's sister (who received the Casentino assets), and his son-in-law Giuseppe Rossi (who inherited thirteen thousand Neapolitan ducats and an annual income of three hundred and fifty Florentine scudi).

== Works ==
- Epistola in qua nonnulla refutantur ex Epistola Grandi de Pandectis ad Averanium. Lucca: typis D. Ciuffetti. 1728.
- Difesa seconda dell’uso antico delle Pandette [...] contro le Vindiciae del P.D. G. Grandi. Florence: appresso Bernardo Paperini. 1729.
- Epistola de Pandectis Pisanis. Florence: typis Bernardi Paperini. 1731.
- Bernardo Tanucci (1758). "Del dominio antico pisano sulla Corsica". Saggi di dissertazioni accademiche. VII. Cortona: 173–198.
- Brieve dissertazione sul sagro militar ordine costantiniano di S. Giorgio. Naples. 1760.
- Diritto della Corona di Napoli sopra Piombino (1738), Naples 1760.
- Istruzioni di S. M. il Re delle due Sicilie per lo sfratto dei gesuiti e sequestro dei loro beni. Venice. 1767.
- Bernardo Tanucci (1769). "Epistola ad J.B. Nerium". Variorum opuscula. 2. Pisa: 3–6.
- Per la vedova Fortunata de Martino madre dei minori Antonio e Caterina Mescovischi, Da esaminarsi nella Suprema Giunta degli Abusi. s.l. 1772.
- Diritto del re delle Sicilie sul Ducato di Castro e Ronciglione. Naples. 1773.

== Bibliography ==
- Rao, Anna Maria (1986). "Bernardo Tanucci e il Settecento meridionale". Quaderni storici. 21 (61): 323–326. JSTOR 43777967.
- Morelli Timpanaro, Maria Augusta (2012). "Su Bernardo Tanucci". Seicento e Settecento: rivista di letteratura italiana. VII: 2012.
- Copeland, R. F. (2003). "Tanucci, Bernardo". New Catholic Encyclopedia (2 ed.). Detroit: Thomson Gale. pp. 754–755.
- Cernigliaro, Aurelio (2012). "Tanucci, Bernardo". Il Contributo italiano alla storia del Pensiero: Diritto. Rome: Istituto dell'Enciclopedia Italiana.
- Moore, John E. (2013). ""To the Catholic King" and Others: Bernardo Tanucci's Correspondence and the Herculaneum Project". Studies in the History of Art. 79: 89–122. JSTOR 42622745.
- Imbruglia, Girolamo (2019). "TANUCCI, Bernardo". Dizionario Biografico degli Italiani (in Italian). Vol. 94: Stampa–Tarantelli. Rome: Istituto dell'Enciclopedia Italiana. ISBN 978-88-12-00032-6.
