= Michele Troja =

Italian physician

- Born: 23 June 1747; Andria (Kingdom of Naples)
- Died: 12 April 1827 (aged 79); Naples (Kingdom of Two Sicilies)
- Other name: Michele Troya
- Citizenship: Kingdom of the Two Sicilies
- Education: University of Naples
- Spouse: Anna Maria Marpacher
- Children: Carlo Troya and Ferdinando Troya (it)
- Scientific career
- Fields: Medicine
- Workplaces: Naples (Italy)

Michele Troja or Michele Troya (23 June 1747 – 12 April 1827) was an Italian physician.

== Biography ==
Troja was born in Andria. His family had intended him to become a clergyman. But since early childhood, he was highly interested in anything that resembled natural sciences.

Thence he studied medicine in Naples where he received his doctorate. In 1774, he received a scholarship to follow postgraduate formation in Paris where he carried on the research of Henri-Louis Duhamel du Monceau on the growth of bones catching the interest of Lazzaro Spallanzani.

Corresponding member of the French Academy of Sciences, he wrote five articles for the Diderot and d’Alembert Encyclopédie supplement. Back in Naples in 1779, he was appointed Head Surgeon of Neapolitan Hospital for Incurables then ophthalmology professor at the University of Naples.

In 1780, he became First Surgeon of Ferdinand I of the Two Sicilies, member of the King's Chamber, and he accompanied the king during his hunting journeys. There Troja performed dissections and worked on botany.

He became closely associated with many famous men of his time: Felice Fontana, Albrecht von Haller, Joseph Lieutaud, Louis-Jean-Marie Daubenton, Félix Vicq-d'Azyr, Giovanni Alessandro Brambilla...

He worked with Fontana on vipers and with Giuseppe Saverio Poli on mollusca.

Troja was the inventor of the natural rubber catheter and the author of several important works on the bone remodeling: the first edition was published in Paris in 1775. He wrote a treatise on eyes diseases, and another on urinary tract diseases.

In 1801, after a violent smallpox outbreak in Palermo, he planned the introduction of Jenner’s smallpox vaccination in Kingdom of the Two Sicilies.

In 1799 and 1807, he lost twice his manuscripts and his library because of Naples lootings.

He died suddenly in 1827 in Naples. He was the father of Carlo Troya and Ferdinando Troya (it), both Prime Ministers of Kingdom of the Two Sicilies.

== Sources ==
- Modestino Del Gaizo (1898). Della vita e delle opere di Michele Troja: memoria prima (in Italian). Tocco.
- Albrecht von Schönberg (1828). Biographie des Dr. and Prof. Michel Troja (in German). J.J. Palm und E. Enke. pp. 22–.
- (in Italian) Gianni Randelli (1964) Ripetizione degli esperimenti di Michele Troja sulla rigenerazione delle ossa, Physis. Leo S. Olschki. 1964.
- Michele Troja (1890). Expériences sur la régénération des os qui ont été... détruits par des maladies, et où... on traite aussi... des fractures et de la force que la nature emploie pour allonger les os pendant leur croissance... par Michel Troja,... Traduction d'après le texte latin par A. Védrènes,... (in French). F. Alcan.
- Grigorij V. Orlov; Amaury Pineu Duval (1821). Mémoires historiques, politiques et littéraires sur le royaume de Naples (in French). Chasseriau et Hécart. pp. 40–.
- Paolo Santoni-Rugiu; Philip J. Sykes (17 August 2007). A History of Plastic Surgery. Springer. pp. 145–. ISBN 978-3-540-46240-8.
