= Alessandro Poerio =

Alessandro Poerio (1802 – 3 November 1848), Italian poet and patriot, The son of Baron Giuseppe Poerio, and uncle of the Neapolitan author Vittorio Imbriani (1840-1886) and his brother the radical politician Matteo Renato Imbriani (1843-1901).

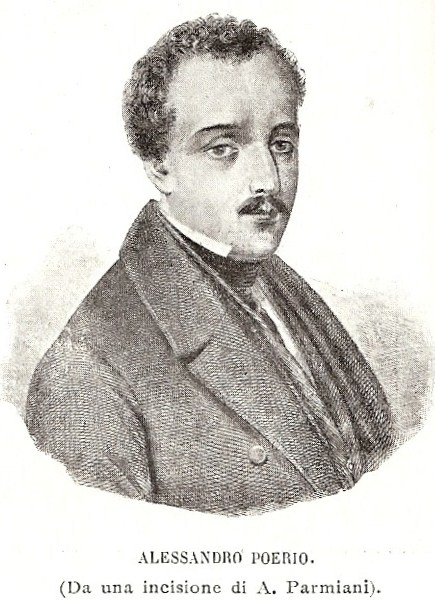
Alessandro Poerio

== Life ==
Descended from an old Calabrian family, he was the son of Baron Giuseppe Poerio (1775-1843) who was born in the town of Belcastro, now in the province of Catanzaro in southern Italy. A noted lawyer of Naples who had attached himself to the cause of Joachim Murat. the Baron was obliged to flee in 1815, taking his sons Alessandro and Carlo with him. They settled for a time in Florence, but in 1818 were allowed to return to Naples. There, on the proclamation of the constitution in 1820, the Poerios were among the stoutest defenders of the newly won freedom.

Alessandro fought as a volunteer under General Guglielmo Pepe against the Austrians in 1821, but when the latter reoccupied Naples and the king abolished the constitution, the family was again exiled and settled at Graz.

A Freemason, he became a close friend of the Italian poet Giacomo Leopardi when the latter and Antonio Ranieri came in Naples in 1833.

Alessandro devoted himself to study in various German universities, and at Weimar he became friendly with the aged Goethe. In 1835, the Poerios again returned to Naples, and Alessandro, while practising law with his father, published a number of lyrics.

== Last years and Death ==
In 1848, he accompanied Guglielmo Pepe, this time as a volunteer to fight the Austrians in northern Italy. When the Neapolitan contingent was recalled, Alessancho followed Pepe to Venice. There he displayed great bravery during the siege. Severely wounded in the fighting at Mestre, he had a leg amputated but died of his injuries within a few days. He is interred at the San Michele cemetery on the Isola di San Michele.

== Poetry ==
As a poet, his work has been thought to reveal the idealism of a tender and delicate mind which was diligent in storing up sensations and images that for others would have been at most the transient impressions of a moment. But he could also sound the clarion note of patriotism, as in his stirring poem Il Risorgimento.

== Legacy ==
There exist streets named after Alessandro Poerio in various Italian cities, including Novara, Milan and Venice. In Mestre, it is located adjacent to the spot where he was fatally wounded, and in Rome, where it forms part of the quarter which extends from the monuments erected on the heights of the Janiculum in commemoration of the Risorgimento to Monteverde Vecchio, it is one of numerous contiguous streets there which bear the name of patriotic figures of the era.

A ship of the Italian Navy named the Alessandro Poerio was built in Liguria, Italy, at the shipyards of the firm Gio. Ansaldo & C. and entered into service on 4 August 1914. Her sister ships were the Guglielmo Pepe and the Cesare Rossarol, initially classed as cruisers. The latter was sunk in 1918, but the other two were re-rated as destroyers in 1921. The Alessandro Poerio served Italy until 1938, when she passed to Spain and from then until decommissioning in 1949 went under the name of Huesca.

In the aftermath of the annexation of the Kingdom of Two Sicilies to the Kingdom of Sardinia in 1860, a Societa letteraria Alessandro Poerio was founded in Catanzaro and published various books.

== See also ==
- Carlo Poerio

== Sources ==
- Erasmo G. Gerato, A Critical Study of the Life and Works of Alessandro Poerio, Parma: C.E.M., 1975.
