= Gennaro Spinelli, Prince of Cariati =

Italian politician (1780–1851)

Gennaro Spinelli, prince of Cariati (14 August 1780, Naples - 3 June 1851, Naples) was an Italian politician and diplomat. He served as President of the Council of Ministers (i.e. Prime Minister) of the Kingdom of the Two Sicilies. He belonged to an aristocratic family from the Kingdom of the Two Sicilies and was also marquess of Fuscaldo, prince of Sant'Arcangelo, duke of Caivano and of Marianella.

== Life ==
He fought for the Parthenopean Republic and served as a naval officer alongside admiral Francesco Caracciolo. He later served as an officer during the French occupation of Naples and then took part in Napoleon's invasion of Russia under the orders of Joachim Murat, fighting at Borodino in 1812. He also served as a diplomat during Naples' Napoleonic period, becoming master of ceremonies to Joseph Bonaparte in 1808 and taking part in the Congress of Vienna on Murat's behalf in 1815. During Luigi de' Medici's constitutional Neapolitan government following the restoration of the Kingdom of the Two Sicilies, Spinelli was sent to Paris on a diplomatic mission of Louis XVIII and to Vienna on one to Francis II (both in 1820).

Carlo Troya, a Neo-Guelphic historian and liberal, had a constitutional government from 3 April 1848, but he was replaced with Spinelli after the coup d'état by Ferdinand II of the Two Sicilies which had dissolved the democratic parliament on 15 May 1848 and

== Bibliography ==
- "Spinèlli, Gennaro, principe di Cariati", Enciclopedia Biografica Universale, (on-line)
