= Carlo Troya =

Italian historian and politician

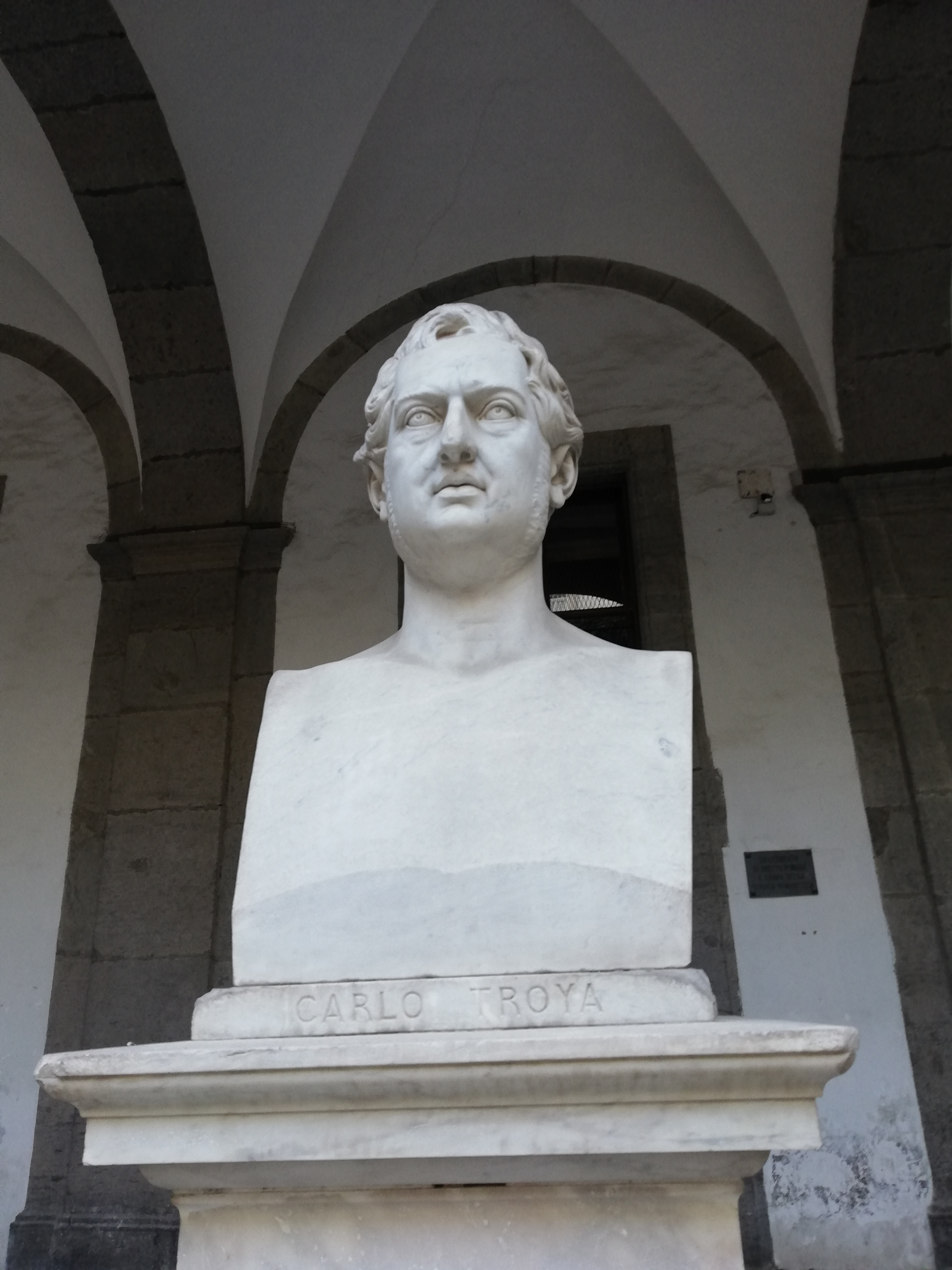
- Bust of Carlo Troya in the courtyard of the statues in Naples
- Born: 7 June 1784; Naples, Italy
- Died: 28 July 1858 (aged 74); Naples, Italy
- Citizenship: Kingdom of the Two Sicilies
- Occupations: Master of Law, historian
- Known for: Ferdinand II Prime Minister
- Movement: Neo-Guelph
- Relatives: Son of Michele Troja and brother of Ferdinando Troya (it)

Carlo Troya (also spelled Troja; 7 June 1784 – 28 July 1858) was a historian and politician who served as Prime Minister of the Two Sicilies from 3 April 1848 until 15 May 1848. Politically, he was a liberal Neo-Guelph who supported Italian unification. His primary historical interest was the study of the Early Middle Ages, to which he made lasting contributions.

== Biography ==
Born in Naples, Troya was the son of Michele Troja and the brother of Ferdinando Troya (it).

Master of Law, he was involved in 1820–1821 Neapolitan insurrections: holding the position of Basilicata Intendant, he worked for the liberal review “Minerva napolitana”, reason why he was sent into exile from 1824 to 1826. Back in Naples, without completely abandoning his political activity, he devoted his time to historical research in particular on the Middle Ages and Dante biography (Del Veltro allegorico di Dante). (Note: Veltro is an Italian Middle Ages word for Greyhound)

As historian he was the first who wrote about Jordanes confusion between Goths and Getae (a Getic people from Carpathian area).

In 1844, he was one of the founders and president until 1847 of the Neapolitan Historic Society. He was also one of the contributors of the newspaper Il Tempo founded with Saverio Baldacchini (it).

Representative of the Neo-Guelph movement, he was appointed prime minister on 3 April 1848 by Ferdinand II according to the Constitution granted on 11 February 1848.

During the First Italian War of Independence, the Troya Government sent an expeditionary force of 15,000 men in Lombardia, commanded by Guglielmo Pepe.

On 15 May 1848, with a coup d'état, Ferdinand II dissolved the democratic Parliament, dismissed Carlo Troja and replaced his Ministry with one composed exclusively of conservative elements and led by Gennaro Spinelli di Cariati.

His brother Ferdinando Troya was Ferdinand II Prime Minister from 1852 to 1859.

On 29 August 1854, Carlo Troya was elected Accademia della Crusca corresponding member.

He died while living in Naples.

== Carlo Troya Ministry ==
- Carlo Troya, President of the Council
- Marquess Luigi Dragonetti, External Affairs Minister
- Giovanni Vignali, Justice and Pardons Minister
- Count Pietro Ferretti, Minister of Finance
- Colonel Vincenzo degli Uberti, Public Work Minister
- Brigadier general Raffaele del Giudice, War and Military Marine Minister
- Nobile Advocate Giovanni d'Avossa, Home Affairs Minister (then, because of disease, Advocate Raffaele Conforti)
- Antonio Scialoia (it), Agriculture and Commerce Minister
- Paolo Emilio Imbriani (it), Education Minister
- Advocate Francesco Paolo Ruggiero (it), Minister for Ecclesiastical Affairs.

== Bibliography ==
- Memoria sulla divisione fisica e politica delle Calabrie, Naples, Ed. A.Trani, 1816.
- Gondebaldo re de' Borgognoni e santo avito vescovo di Vienna sul Rodano, Naples, 1826.
- C. Troya (1857). Delle Donne Fiorentine di Dante Alighieri e del suo lungo soggiorno in Pisa ed in Lucca: (Estratto dall'Antologia Contemporanea, Anno I. N. 3) (in Italian)..
- Carlo Troya (1842). Storia d'Italia del medio-evo (in Italian). Tip. del Tasso stamp. reale. pp. 1331–..
- Conte Carlo Troya (1844). Della condizione de' romani vinti da' Longobardi: e della vera lezione d'alcune parole di Paolo Diacono intorno a tale argomento (in Italian). dalla Società tipografica de' classici italiani..
- Discorso intorno ad Everardo figliuolo del re Desiderio ed al vescovo Attone di Vercelli, Naples, 1845.
- De'viaggi di Dante in Parigi e dell'anno in cui fu pubblicata la cantica dell'Inferno (in Italian). s.n. 1845. pp. 3–..
- Codice diplomatico longobardo (1852). Codice diplomatico longobardo dal DLXVIII al DCCLXXIV, con note storiche, osservazioni e dissertazioni di C. Troya. 5 tom. [and] Indice (in Italian). pp. 1–..
- Carlo Troya (conte) (1854). Leggi sui maestri Comacini promulgate dal re Liutprando con altri documenti tratti dal quarto volume del Codice diplomatico longobardo (in Italian). Stamperia reale..
