= Carlo Poerio =

Italian poet (1803–1867)

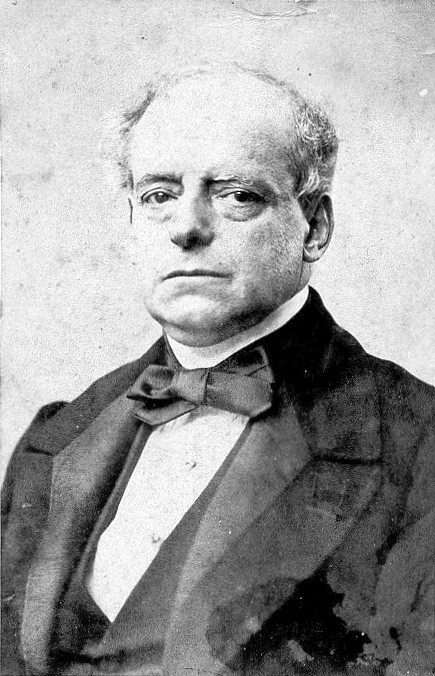
- Born: 13 October 1803; Naples
- Died: 27 April 1867 (aged 63); Firenze

Carlo Poerio (13 October 1803 - 28 April – 27 April 1867) was an Italian poet, Risorgimento and 1848 Revolution activist, politician, and brother of Alessandro Poerio.

== Early life ==
Descended from an old Calabrian family, Carlo Poerio was born on 13 October 1803 in Naples. He was the son of Baron Giuseppe Poerio, a lawyer of Naples who had attached himself to the cause of the King of Naples Joachim Murat. Consequently, the Baron was obliged to flee in 1815, taking his sons Alessandro and Carlo with him. They settled for a time in Florence, but in 1818 were allowed to return to Naples.

== 1848 revolution ==
He returned to Naples and practised as a lawyer, and from 1837 to 1848 was frequently arrested and imprisoned, helping among others to prepare the insurrection of 1847; but, when Ferdinand II, moved by the demonstration on 27 January of the latter year, promulgated a constitution, he was made minister of education. Discovering that the monarch maintained a will to collaborate with the Austrian Empire, he resigned office in April 1849, and returned to Naples to take his seat in parliament, where he led the constitutional opposition.

== Imprisonment, refuge, and return ==
After the battle of Novara, the king was free to dissolve parliament and renounce the constitution; in the month of July 1849 Poerio was arrested, tried, and sentenced to nineteen years in prison. Chained in pairs, he and other political prisoners were confined in one small room in the labor camp on Nisida (the Phlegraean Islands).

William Ewart Gladstone's report on the inhumane conditions in Neapolitan detention facilities (1851), emphasizing the case of Poerio, provoked an international uproar; nonetheless, Poerio was set free only in 1858. He and other exiles were then placed on board a ship bound for the Argentina, but the son of Luigi Settembrini (both of them on board the ship) compelled the crew to land them at Cork, in the United Kingdom, after which Poerio made his way to London.

In the following year he returned to Italy, and, in 1860 he was elected deputy to the parliament of Piedmont-Sardinia in Turin (the original seat of the House of Savoy government), and was chosen the body's vice-president in 1861, when the Kingdom of Italy was proclaimed.
