= Luigi de' Medici =

Italian nobleman, legal scholar, diplomat and statesman

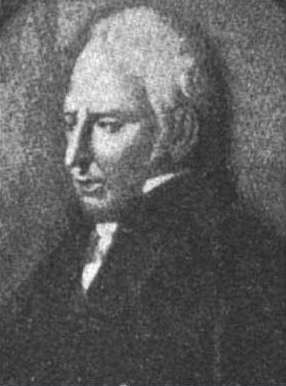

Prime Minister of Kingdom of the Two Sicilies
- In office 27 June 1816 – 9 July 1820
- Preceded by: Tommaso di Somma
- Succeeded by: Tommaso di Somma
- In office June 1822 – 25 January 1830
- Preceded by: Tommaso di Somma
- Succeeded by: Donato Tommasi

Personal details
- Born: 21 April 1759 Naples, Campania, Italy
- Died: January 25, 1830 (aged 70) Madrid, Spain
- Parent(s): Michele de' Medici and Carmela de' Medici (née Filomarino)
- Education: University of Naples Federico II

Luigi de' Medici (21 April 1759 – 25 January 1830) was an Italian nobleman, legal scholar, diplomat and statesman, who served as Prime minister of the Kingdom of the Two Sicilies and the legal representative at the Congress of Vienna.

Luigi de' Medici lived and worked through some of the most tumultuous periods of the Kingdom of Naples: straddling the final stages of the reactionary reforms of Sir John Acton; the short-lived Parthenopean Republic proclaimed in Naples by Napoleon in 1799; the Sanfedismo (its fall); the retreat of the Bourbon court to Palermo under English protection after Napoleon took Naples a second time (1806); their restoration; and the eventual suppression of the Sicilian constitution and autonomy when the Kingdoms of Naples and Sicily were unified into the Kingdom of the Two Sicilies (1816).

== Biography ==
=== Early life ===
He belonged to the Neapolitan branch of the princely Florentine House of Medici, a cadet branch founded in 1567 by Bernadetto de' Medici after he acquired the vast fief of Ottaviano. Luigi was born as a younger son of Michele de' Medici (fifth Prince of Ottajano and fifth Duke of Sarno) and his wife Carmela Filomarino.

He took a degree in law in 1780 and in the early years of the reign of Ferdinand IV of Naples, he practiced law in Naples. He attended progressive circles and befriended Annibale Giordano, Gaetano Filangieri, Melchiorre Delfico and Mario Pagano. In 1783 he became Regent of the Grand Court of the Vicaria, the highest tribunal in the kingdom. In 1787 he was awarded the grand cross of the he Sacred Military Constantinian Order of Saint George. He became “Protector” of the academy of chemistry and mathematics founded in 1790 by Annibale Giordano and Carlo Lauberg.

=== Arrest ===
In 1794, under extreme pressure from Maria Carolina and the prime minister Sir John Acton, the King created a Giunta di Stato, a tribunal consisting of seven judges set up to investigate all those suspected of having contacts with freemasons and Jacobins. The Giunta was used by Acton as a personal instrument through which to rid himself of his rivals. As a favorite of Ferdinand and Maria Carolina, Medici enjoyed a relationship with them that aroused the envy of the Englishman. Moreover, Medici's sympathies toward the Neapolitan Jacobins were well known. Medici was betrayed to Sir John Acton by one of his closest friends, the mathematician Annibale Giordano. Acton, who rewarded Giordano for his "meritorious action," apprized the King and Queen of the incriminating disclosure.

When Luigi de' Medici learned from the Court that he was persona non grata, he decided to give himself up to its custody. He sent a memorandum through Sir John Acton himself, asking to be suspended from his ministerial duties, and to be incarcerated until his innocence could be proven. On February 25, 1795, he was summoned by the sovereigns to the Royal Palace of Caserta to be questioned by the Council of State concerning his alleged role in a Jacobin conspiracy. Acton produced what are reputed to be forged documents that implicated de' Medici. Although a monarchist, he was found guilty of conspiracy on February 28, was arrested and imprisoned in the castle at Gaeta.

In 1798, at the end of the long trial, Medici was released and cleared of all charges.

=== Napoleonic period ===
In April 1799, after the proclamation of the Parthenopean Republic (1799), Medici was arrested as a suspected royalist, but was freed from prison during the Bourbon Restoration.

In 1803 he was appointed minister of finance by the king, and, in April 1804, he was made secretary of state. Medici enjoyed the trust of the capital's financial oligarchy and was considered essential to the health of the kingdom's economy. After the occupation of Naples by the French (1806), he fled with the king to Sicily. In 1815 he returned with the Bourbons to Naples. He was Minister of Police when Joachim Murat attempted the invasion of Calabria. Medici ordered the coasts to be watched, and Murat was captured, sentenced to death, and shot by firing squad in Pizzo Calabro on 13 October 1815.

=== Bourbon Restoration ===
On 27 June 1816 Medici was appointed prime minister by the king. The revolutionary and Napoleonic experiences had definitively influenced the thought of Italian conservatives, divided into those who were in favour of an opening up towards new times, and those who favoured a blind return to the ancien régime. Medici came into conflict with the reactionary members of the Neapolitan government, especially the minister of police Antonio Capece Minutolo. While Medici favoured a policy of reconciliation with those who had collaborated with the French (the so-called “amalgam politics”), Canosa was determined to root out any revolutionary threat by purging the justice system, the army, the civil service and the educational system of all those who had compromised themselves with Murat's government. He endeavoured to unleash a massive repression against the Carbonari and Freemasons, and proposed to arm and support the Calderari, a secret society formed early in the century in opposition to the Carbonari. The Austrian and Russian ambassadors in Naples opposed Canosa, and gave their sympathies to Medici, with the result that Ferdinand I was persuaded to dismiss Canosa in June 1816. Under Medici's influence, the restoration in Naples kept in place most of the reforms enacted during the Napoleonic era.

In 1818 Medici concluded a Concordat with the pope. The Concordat restored ecclesiastical courts to deal with offences by priests, placed censorship in the hands of the bishops, and re-established many monasteries that were suppressed during the Napoleonic period. Medici's administration, particularly the ban on secret societies, the re-establishment of convents and the administrative unification of the kingdoms of Naples and Sicily, met with great opposition in liberal circles. The Carbonari, a secret society of republican, anti-papal forces, started to grow at an alarming rate and soon affected a large part of the army. In July 1820, a military revolt broke out under General Guglielmo Pepe, and the king was forced to concede a constitution.

After the outbreak of the revolution Medici resigned his office and retired to Rome, where he remained for some time after the return of the king of Naples. But when the new minister of police Antonio Capece Minutolo proved unable of restoring order, the king, on the advice of Metternich, resolved to form a new government, and Medici was appointed minister of finances. Until his death in 1830, Medici remained in control of the Kingdom's finances and its commercial policies. Milder measures were now adopted, and to cover the deficit in the revenue a loan had to be contracted with the house of Rothschild. When the king went to the congress of Verona, and afterwards to Vienna, Medici was appointed prime minister. He found himself obliged to contract a new loan with the house of Rothschild for two millions and a half pounds sterling, for which customs and other indirect taxes were imposed. Under the reign of Francis I, Medici retained his post. He followed the king to Madrid and is said to have been consulted respecting the regulation of the embarrassed finances of Spain. He died in Madrid on 25 January 1830.

== Works ==
- I. Del Bagno, ed. (1998). Memorie dei miei tempi, messe per iscritto nel 1810. Naples: Edizioni Scientifiche Italiane. ISBN 8881144840.

== Bibliography ==
- Gatti, Serafino (1830). Elogio funebre del cavaliere D. Luigi de' Medici. Naples: dalla Tipografia Trani.
- Capece Minutolo, Antonio (1832). Vita politica del cavaliere Luigi de' Medici. Paris.
- Nicolini, Nicola (1935). Luigi de' Medici e il giacobinismo napoletano. Florence: Le Monnier.
- Blanch, Luigi (1945). "Luigi de' Medici come uomo di Stato e amministratore". In Benedetto Croce (ed.). Scritti storici. Vol. II. Bari: Laterza. pp. 3–118.
- Nicolini, Niccola (1976). "Il «costituto» di Luigi de' Medici (1797)". Studi in memoria di Nino Cortese. Roma: Istituto per la storia del Risorgimento italiano. pp. 361–380.
- Vanga, Mauro (2009). "MEDICI, Luigi de'". Dizionario Biografico degli Italiani (in Italian). Vol. 73: Meda–Messadaglia. Rome: Istituto dell'Enciclopedia Italiana. ISBN 978-88-12-00032-6.
- Renda, Francesco (2011). Maria Carolina e Lord Bentinck nel diario di Luigi de' Medici. Palermo: Sellerio. ISBN 978-8838925573.
