= Melchiorre Delfico (economist) =

Italian economist

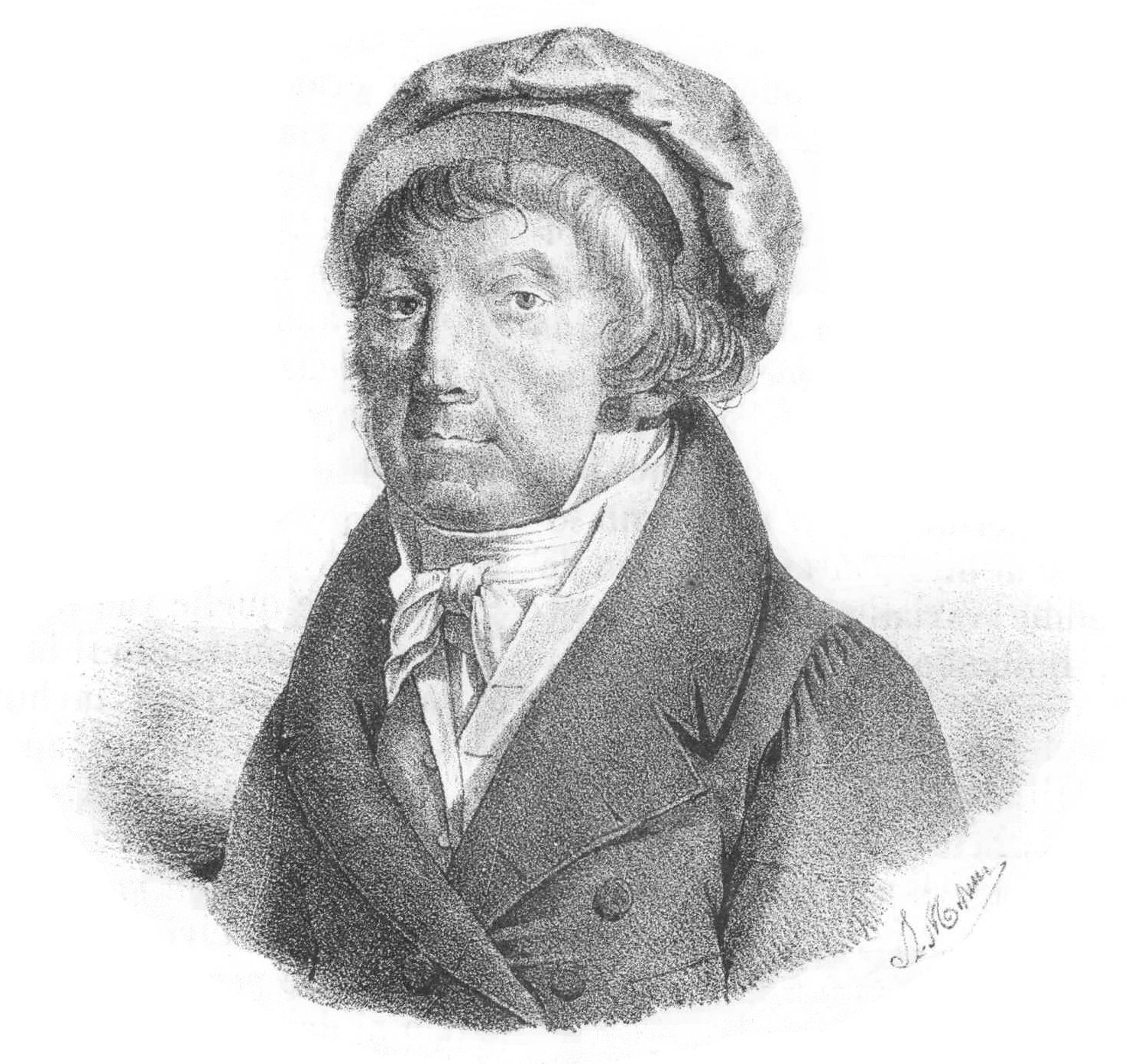
- Portrait by an unknown artist, 1835
- Born: 1 August 1744 Teramo, Abruzzo, Kingdom of Naples
- Died: 22 June 1835 (aged 90) Teramo, Abruzzo, Kingdom of the Two Sicilies
- Occupation: Economist
- Subject: Jurisprudence; Political economy
- Relatives: Melchiorre Delfico (nephew)

Melchiorre Delfico (1 August 1744 – 22 June 1835) was an Italian economist.

== Biography ==
Delfico was born at Teramo, in the Abruzzo (then in the Kingdom of Naples) and was educated at Naples. He devoted himself specially to the study of jurisprudence and political economy, and his numerous publications exercised great practical influence in the correction and extinction of many abuses. Under Joseph Bonaparte Delfico was made a councillor of state, an office which he held until the restoration of Ferdinand IV, when he was appointed president of the commission of archives, from which he retired in 1825.

Melchiorre Delfico died at Teramo in 1835. His nephew was the caricaturist Melchiorre Delfico.

== Works ==
His most important works include:

- Saggio filosofico sul matrimonio (1774)
- Memoria sul Tribunale della Grascia e sulle leggi economiche nelle provincie confinanti del regno (1785), which led to the abolition in Naples of the most vexatious and absurd restrictions on the sale and exportation of agricultural produce.
- Riflessioni su la vendita dei feudi (1790) and Lettera a Sua Ecc. sig. Duca di Cantalupo which brought about the abolition of feudal rights over landed property and their sale
- Ricerche sul vero carattere della giurisprudenza Romana e dei suoi cultori (1791) and Pensieri sulla Istoria e su l'incertezza ed inutilità della medesima (1806), both on the early history of Rome.
