= Luigi Settembrini =

Italian politician (1813–1877)

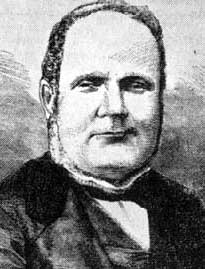
Luigi Settembrini

Luigi Settembrini (17 April 1813, Naples – 3 November 1877, Florence) was an Italian man of letters and politician.

== Biography ==
Born in Naples, his paternal grandfather was an immigrant from Bollita (the actual Nova Siri), in the province of Matera. Aged 22, he was appointed professor of eloquence at Catanzaro, and married Raffaela Luigia Faucitano (1835). While still a young man he had been affected by the wave of liberalism then spreading all over Italy, and soon after his marriage he began to conspire mildly against the Bourbon government.

Betrayed by a priest, he was arrested in 1839 and imprisoned at Naples; although liberated three years later, he lost his professorship and had to maintain himself by private lessons. Nevertheless, he continued to conspire, and in 1847, he published anonymously the Protest of the People of the Two Sicilies, a scathing indictment of the Bourbon government.

On the advice of his friends, he went to Malta on a British warship, but although when King Ferdinand II granted a constitution (February 16, 1848), he returned to Naples and was given an appointment at the ministry of education, he soon resigned on account of the prevailing chaos, and retired to a farm at Posillipo.

When reaction set in, once more, Settembrini was arrested as a suspect (June 1849) and imprisoned. After trial, he and two other "politicals" were condemned to death, and nineteen others to varying terms of imprisonment (February 1851). The death sentences were, however, commuted to imprisonment for life, and Settembrini was sent to the dungeons of Santo Stefano. There, he remained for eight years. His friends, including Antonio Panizzi, then in England, made various unsuccessful attempts to liberate him, and at last, he was deported with sixty-five other political prisoners.

The exiles received an enthusiastic welcome in London, but Settembrini, after a short stay in England, joined his family at Florence in 1860.

On the formation of the Italian kingdom, he was appointed professor of Italian literature at the university of Naples, and devoted the rest of his life to literary pursuits. In 1875, he was nominated senator.

His chief work is his Lezioni di letteratura italiana, of which the dominant note is the conviction that Italian literature "is as the very soul of the nation, seeking, in opposition to medieval mysticism, reality, freedom, independence of reason, truth and beauty" (P. Villari).

Settembrini's homosexuality was first mentioned in 1977, the year of the publication of The Neoplatonics, a homoerotic fantasy written while in prison soon after completing his translation of Lucian (1858–1859). Left among his papers at his death, the manuscript was afterwards read by Benedetto Croce, who advised against publication.
