= Alessandro Manzoni =

Italian poet and novelist (1785–1873)

Signore di Moncucco di Mirasole Alessandro Manzoni OCI, OSG, OSML, PM
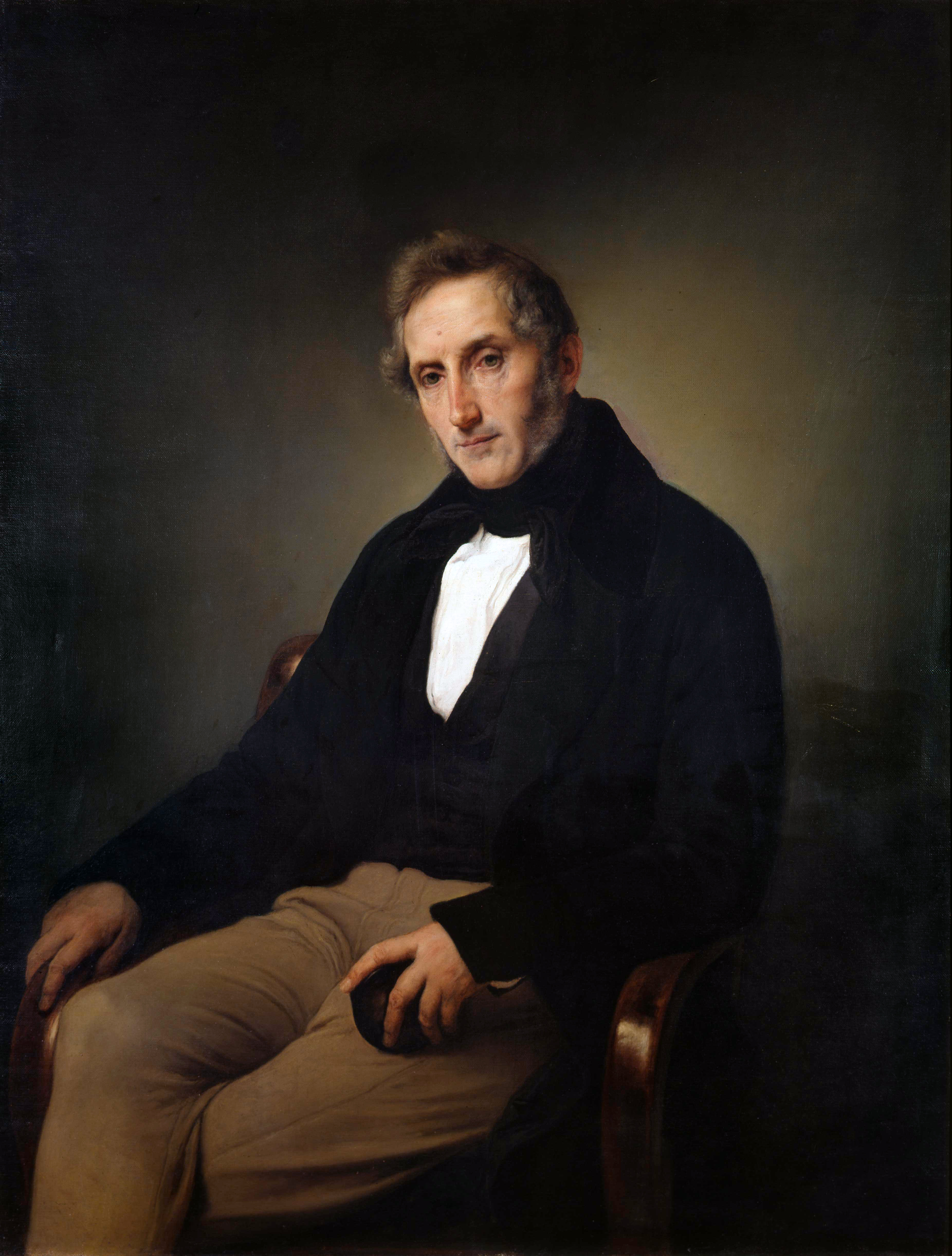
- Portrait of Alessandro Manzoni by Francesco Hayez (Pinacoteca di Brera, Milan, 1841)

Senator of the Kingdom of Italy
- In office 29 February 1860 – 22 May 1873
- Monarch: Victor Emmanuel II

Deputy of the Kingdom of Sardinia
- In office 17 October 1848 – 21 October 1848

Personal details
- Born: Alessandro Francesco Tommaso Manzoni; 7 March 1785 Milan, Duchy of Milan
- Died: 22 May 1873 (aged 88) Milan, Kingdom of Italy
- Resting place: Monumental Cemetery, Milan
- Party: Historical Right
- Spouse(s): Enrichetta Blondel (m. 1808; died 1833) Teresa Borri (m. 1837; died 1861)
- Children: Giulia Claudia (1808–1834); Pietro Luigi (1813–1873); Cristina (1815–1841); Sofia (1817–1845); Enrico (1819–1881); Clara (1821–1823); Vittoria (1822–1892); Filippo (1826–1868); Matilde (1830–1856)
- Parents: Pietro Manzoni (father); Giulia Beccaria (mother)
- Relatives: Cesare Beccaria (grandfather); Massimo d'Azeglio (son-in-law)
- Occupation: Writer; poet; dramatist
- Writing career
- Years active: 1801–1873
- Period: 19th century
- Genres: Historical fiction; tragedy; poetry
- Subjects: Religion; politics; history
- Notable works: Il cinque maggio (1821); Adelchi (1822); The Betrothed (1823, 1827, and 1842)
- Movements: Enlightenment; Romanticism

Alessandro Francesco Tommaso Antonio Manzoni (UK: /mænˈzoʊni/, US: /mɑːn(d)ˈzoʊni/, Italian: [alesˈsandro manˈdzoːni]; 7 March 1785 – 22 May 1873) was an Italian philosopher, poet, playwright, and novelist. He is best known for the novel The Betrothed (Italian: I promessi sposi), generally ranked among the masterpieces of world literature. The novel, published in 1827, is a symbol of the Italian Risorgimento for its patriotic message, and also because it was a fundamental milestone in the development of the modern and unified Italian language.

Manzoni contributed to the stabilization of the modern Italian language and helped to ensure linguistic unity throughout Italy. He was an influential proponent of Liberal Catholicism in Italy. He is also considered one of the three crowns of Romanticism in Italy, along with Ugo Foscolo and Giacomo Leopardi, despite their differences. He is often associated as the moral and cultural leader of the Italian unification with his younger contemporary Leopardi, although his work and thinking often contrast with the latter.

== Early life ==
Manzoni was born in Milan, Italy, on 7 March 1785. Pietro, his father, aged about fifty, belonged to an old family of Lecco, originally feudal lords of Barzio, in the Valsassina. His biological father was likely Giovanni Verri, brother of the influential Enlightenment thinkers Pietro and Alessandro Verri, and a habitué, along with his brothers and Giulia Beccaria, of the dazzling liberal Società del Caffè. Manzoni's maternal grandfather, Cesare Beccaria, was a well-known author and philosopher, and his mother Giulia had literary talent as well. The young Manzoni spent his first two years in cascina Costa in Galbiate and he was wet-nursed by Caterina Panzeri, as attested by a memorial tablet affixed in the place. In 1792, his parents broke their marriage and his mother began a relationship with the writer Carlo Imbonati, moving to England and later to Paris.

As a boy, the young Manzoni rarely saw his mother. He seems to have had a cool and distant relationship with his father. At the age of six, he was sent away from home to begin his schooling in a variety of religious boarding schools operated by the Somaschi and Barnabite fathers. From an early age, Manzoni was drawn to literature, to poetry in particular, and to the ideals of liberty, reason, and atheism. Among his first poems was one from this period entitled The Triumph of Liberty (1801), a poem of considerable merit in praise of the French Revolution. In 1804, Manzoni began to frequent the circle of Neoclassical poets gathered around Vincenzo Monti, whom he had already known and admired for some time before; Monti's influence is especially apparent in the poems of Manzoni's classicist period, most notably Adda (1803), and Urania (1807). His friendship with the scholars Francesco Lomonaco and Vincenzo Cuoco, who had fled Bourbon Naples after the fall of the Parthenopean Republic, further contributed to his revolutionary leanings and introduced him to historical studies and the philosophical ideas of Giambattista Vico. In 1804, Cuoco entrusted the nineteen year old Manzoni with the editing of his novel Platone in Italia.

Manzoni sojourned in Venice from the fall of 1803 to the spring of the following year. Here he attended salon hosted by Isabella Teotochi Albrizzi and made the acquaintance of Ippolito Pindemonte and Ugo Foscolo. Upon the death of his father in 1807, he joined the freethinking household of his mother at Auteuil, and came into contact with the group of philosophers known as the Idéologues, among whom he made many friends, notably Claude Charles Fauriel. He established close ties with the intellectual leader of the Idéologues, Antoine Destutt de Tracy, whose daughter he was at a certain point supposed to marry.

Through Fauriel and Madame de Condorcet, Manzoni met some of the leading intellectual figures of Paris, among them Augustin Thierry, François Guizot, Pierre Jean Georges Cabanis, and Benjamin Constant. He became a close friend of Victor Cousin, Marcellin de Fresne and Marquis Jean-Baptiste de Montgrand, who later translated into French Manzoni's Inni Sacri and The Betrothed. In 1806–1807, while at Auteuil, Manzoni published his first works, the neoclassical poem Urania, inspired by Monti's Musogonia, and an elegy in blank verse, on the death of Count Carlo Imbonati. In the notes to his Sepolcri, Foscolo highly praised Manzoni's ode In morte di Carlo Imbonati as the "poetry of a young talent born for literature and warm with love of country".

== 1808–1821 ==
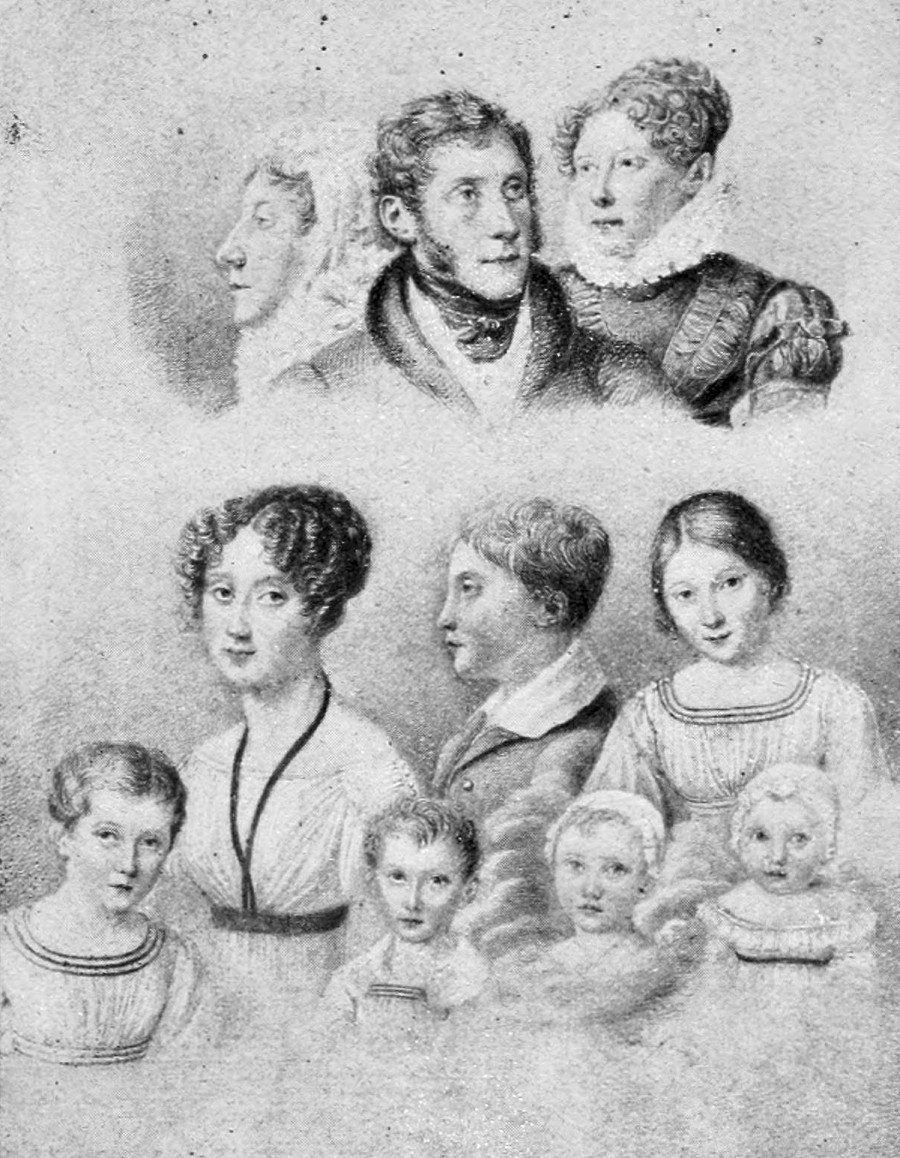
Manzoni's family in a drawing by Ernesta Legnani Bisi

In 1808, Manzoni married Henriette Blondel, daughter of a Genevese banker. She came from a Calvinist family, but in 1810 she became a Roman Catholic. Her conversion profoundly influenced her husband. That same year he experienced a religious crisis which led him from agnosticism to an austere form of Catholicism. The Manzoni family returned to Milan in June 1810. On his return to Milan, Manzoni fell in with the circle of progressive young artists and intellectuals gathered around the poet Carlo Porta, the Cameretta Portiana. In honor of Porta, Manzoni wrote his only poem in the Lombard language.

In 1814, Manzoni settled with his wife in the house in Via Morone, Milan, where he continued to live until his death. The family divided its time between Milan and the country estate that Carlo Imbonati had left to his mother Giulia at Brusuglio, some six miles west of Milan. Manzoni's marriage proved a happy one, and he led for many years a retired domestic life, divided between literature and the picturesque husbandry of Lombardy. Earlier in 1812, Manzoni began a collection of lyrics known as the Sacred Hymns (in Italian: Inni Sacri), which were published along with other of his religious poems in 1815. This sequence of hymns was supposed to cover the major festivals of the ecclesiastical year, a sort of Catholic Fasti, and were to number at least twelve, but Manzoni ultimately only completed five of them. The collection was received warmly by Goethe, who saw the young Italian poet restoring vitality to jejune religious topics, and by Stendhal, who claimed to see in Manzoni a talent to rival Lord Byron.

His intellectual energy in this period of his life was also devoted to the composition of a scholarly treatise on Catholic morality, Osservazioni sulla morale cattolica, written in response to Jean Charles Léonard de Sismondi, who "attributed the moral corruption of the Italians to the papacy". Two patriotic lyrics, celebrating the Milanese insurrection of 1814 and the Rimini Proclamation of 1815, belong to the same epoch. In 1818, he had to sell his paternal inheritance, as his money had been lost to a dishonest agent. His characteristic generosity was shown at this time in his dealings with his peasants, who were heavily indebted to him. He not only cancelled on the spot the record of all sums owed to him, but bade them keep for themselves the whole of the coming maize harvest. While he shared many of the cultural and political aims of the Milanese Romantic circles, Manzoni was always cautious in his overt pronouncements. He declined invitations to contribute to the most prominent of the Italian Romantic literary magazine, the influential though short-lived Il Conciliatore (1 September 1818 – 10 October 1819). In his only public statement on the subject, Lettera sul Romanticismo, published in 1823, he expressed agreement with the Romantics' condemnation of the use of classical mythology, slavish imitation of ancient authors, and normative rules such as the classical unities, but he rejected the excesses of northern European Romantics.

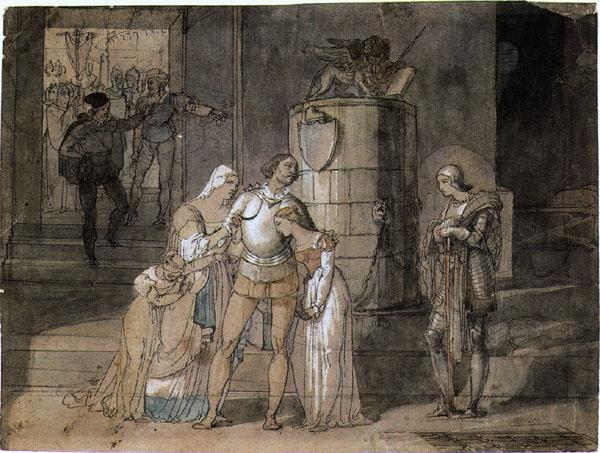
Illustration for the tragedy Il Conte di Carmagnola by Francesco Hayez

In 1819, Manzoni published his first tragedy, Il Conte di Carmagnola, which, boldly violating all classical conventions, excited a lively controversy. The protagonist of the play is the Renaissance condottiero Francesco Bussone, falsely accused of betrayal by the Venetian Senate, condemned to death, and executed. Although it was written in verse, the tragedy follows Romantic canons, disregarding the pseudo-Aristotelian unities of time and place and including choruses with the function of commenting on the action, as had been theorized by the German Romantic poet Schlegel. Manzoni's theatrical reform caused a great stir both in Italy and abroad; it is worth mentioning that his attacks on the dramatic unities in Prefazione al Carmagnola (1820) and Lettre à M. Chauvet (1823), published in the French edition of the tragedy, antedate Hugo's Préface à Cromwell (1827) by at least seven years. The tragedy was severely criticized in a Quarterly Review article to which Goethe replied in its defence, "one genius," as Angelo de Gubernatis remarks, "having divined the other."

Manzoni was enthused by the Piedmontese revolution of March 1821. On this occasion he wrote one of his most famous poems, the ode March 1821. First published only in 1848, the ode expresses Manzoni's enthusiasm over the news of the Turin insurrection an enthusiasm that led him to imagine the triumphal entry of the Piedmontese into Lombardy. The death of Napoleon in 1821 inspired Manzoni's powerful stanzas Il Cinque maggio (The Fifth of May), one of the most popular lyrics in the Italian language. The ode is a poetic meditation on destiny, and on the mystery of the great figures that from time to time burst onto the stage of history. The poetry is pervaded with a profound Christian spirit, perhaps even purer and intenser than the spirit of his more definitely religious works. The poem was immensely successful throughout Europe and was translated into German by Goethe.

== The Betrothed ==
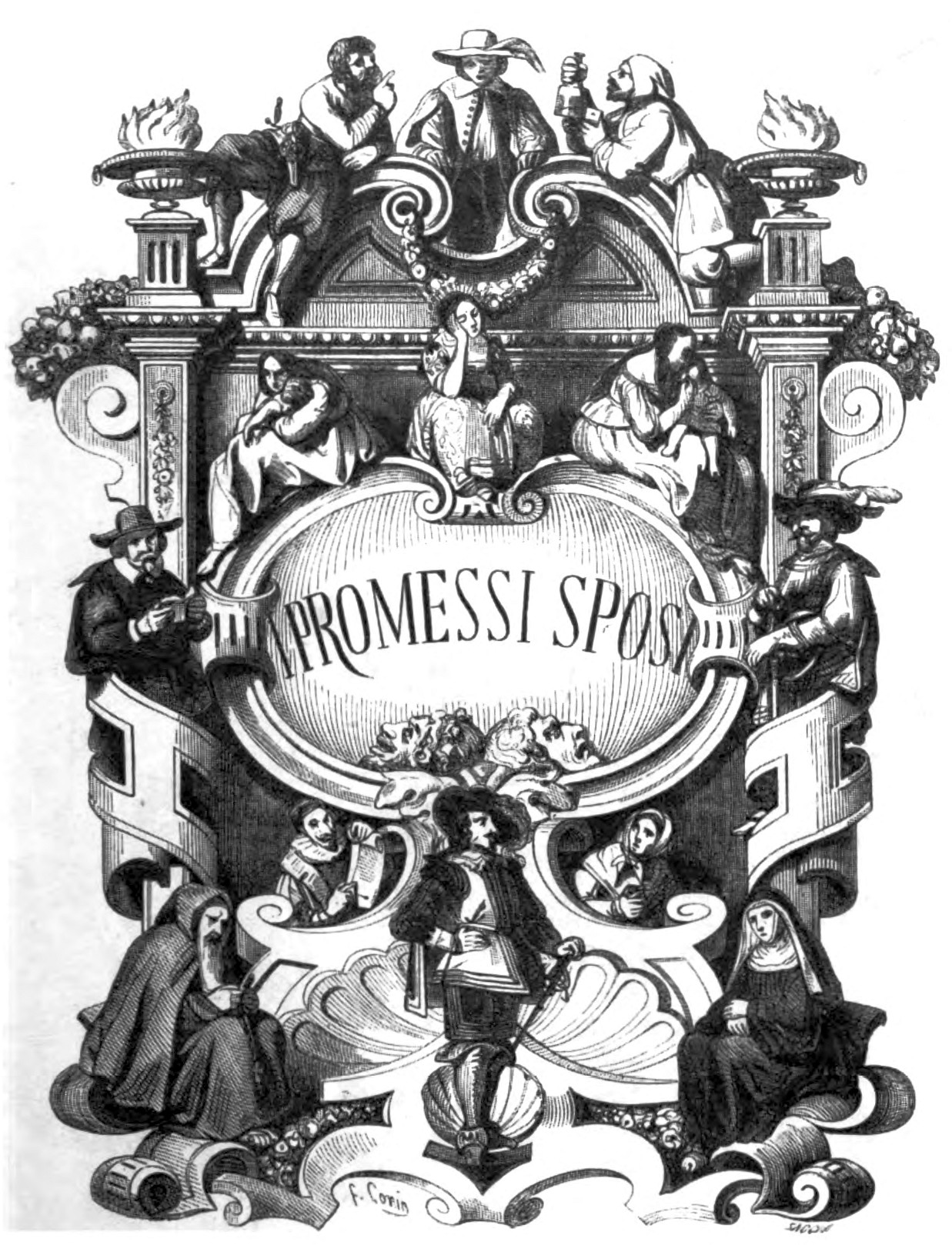
Frontispiece of The Betrothed in the second definitive edition of 1840–1842

Manzoni started work on the novel in 1821. The political events of that year, and the imprisonment of many of his friends, weighed much on Manzoni's mind, and the historical studies in which he sought distraction during his subsequent retirement at Brusuglio suggested his great work. He began the actual composition of Fermo e Lucia on 24 April 1821 after reading the novels of Walter Scott, mainly in French translations.

Round the episode of the Innominato, historically identified with Francesco Bernardino Visconti, the first manuscript of the novel The Betrothed (in Italian: I promessi sposi) began to grow into shape, and was completed in September 1823. The work was published, after being deeply reshaped by the author and revised by friends in 1825–1827, at the rate of a volume a year; it at once raised its author to the first rank of literary fame. It is generally agreed to be his greatest work, and the paradigm of modern Italian language. Set in Lombardy under Spanish rule in the 17th century, the novel narrates the story of two fiancés, Renzo Tramaglino and Lucia Mondella, who endure famine, war, and plague as well as corruption in Church and State before they are finally united. The Betrothed is very much a realist novel: the two protagonists are ordinary people, the style and the language are plain and everyday, and the narrative situations are drawn from everyday life. The novel is particularly notable for its strong characterization: Manzoni is able to unfold a character in all particulars, to display it in all its aspects, to follow it through its different phases.

The story of Renzo and Lucia is interwoven with the great historic events of the 17th century (the Thirty Years' War, the famine of 1628, and the plague of 1630) in a vast social panorama whose protagonists are at the same time Cardinal Federico Borromeo, the most noble religious figure of the time, the Unnamed (Francesco Bernardino Visconti), the most feared outlaw of his day, and many other individuals both named or left anonymous in the novel. Immediately hailed as a work of genius, the novel went through 68 editions and sold over 60,000 copies in the next fourteen years. It was soon translated into French, German and English. Such international writers as Goethe, Edgar Allan Poe and Stendhal, and the influential Italian critics Niccolò Tommaseo, Silvio Pellico, Pietro Giordani and Francesco de Sanctis praised the work. In an enthusiastic review published in 1838 on The Monthly Chronicle, Mary Shelley called Manzoni "a man of first-rate genius".

The Penguin Companion to European Literature notes that 'the book's real greatness lies in its delineation of character...in the heroine, Lucia, in Padre Cristoforo, the Capuchin friar, and the saintly cardinal (Borromeo) of Milan, he has created three living examples of that pure and wholehearted Christianity which is his ideal. But his psychological penetration extends also to those who fall short of this standard, whether through weakness or perversity, and the novel is rich in pictures of ordinary men and women, seen with a delightful irony and disenchantment which always stops short of cynicism, and which provides a perfect balance for the evangelical fervour of his ideal'. According to Peter Brooks, "The Betrothed is the most original and powerful of European historical novels in the tradition of Walter Scott ... It ranks with The Charterhouse of Parma and War and Peace as a drama of life lived within the dynamics of history."

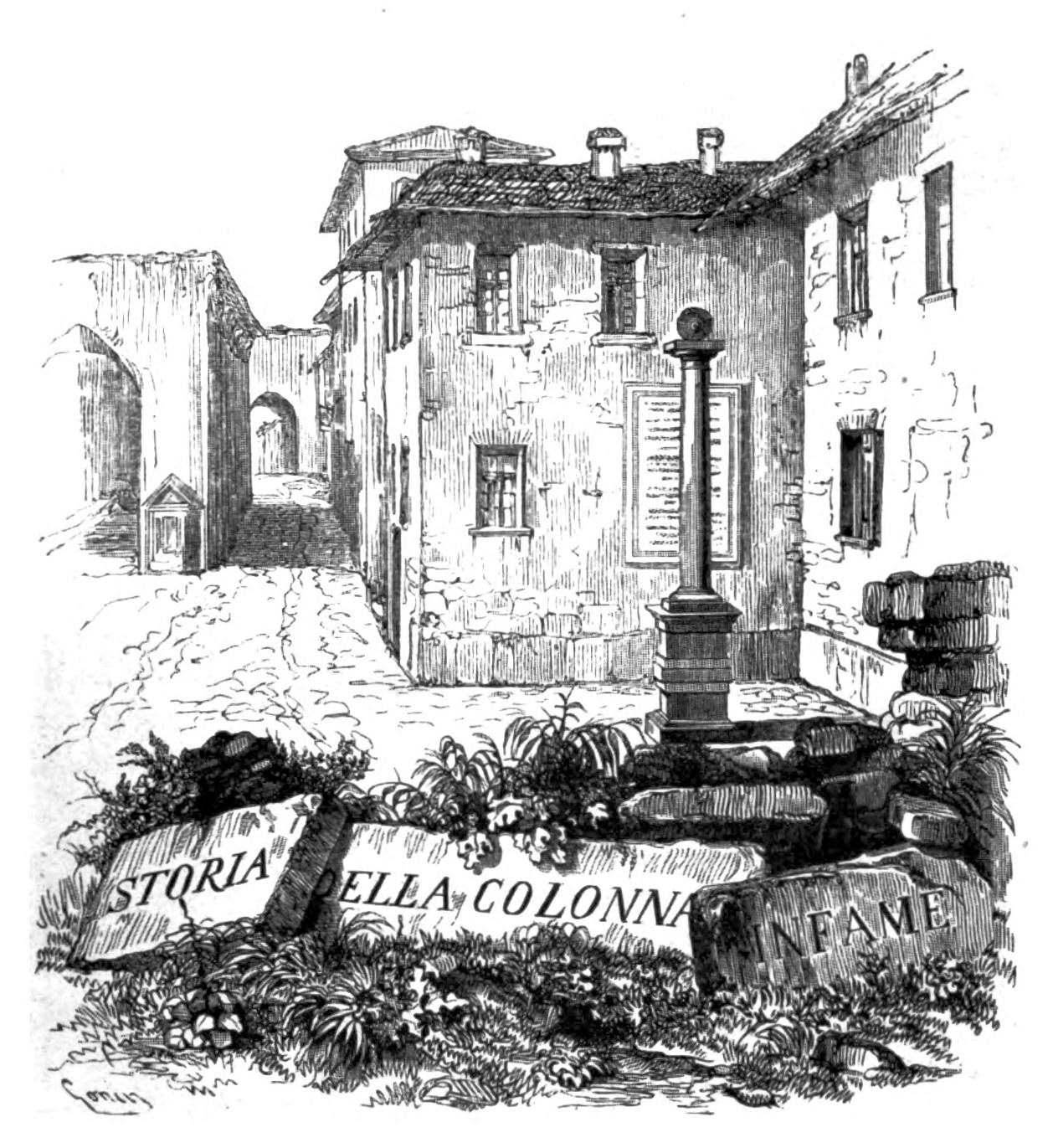
Frontispiece of the Storia della colonna infame, 1842

Following a stay in Florence in 1827 Manzoni began a thorough linguistic revision of The Betrothed. His aim was to bring the novel's language closer to the kind of Florentine dialect spoken by the educated classes. He enlisted the help of two Florentine friends, Gaetano Cioni and Giovanni Battista Niccolini, to whom he gave copies of his novel, asking them to make corrections in the margin wherever the language was not in conformity with modern, cultured Florentine. The revised edition of his masterpiece was published in serialised from 1840 to 1842. It was integrated by 450 pictures by the famous illustrator Francesco Gonin.

As an appendix to the second edition of The Betrothed, Manzoni published in 1842 the Storia della colonna infame (History of the infamous column). The essay recounts the trial of Health Commissioner Guglielmo Piazza and barber Gian Giacomo Mora during the plague of 1630. Both men were sentenced to death as "untori" (people suspected of spreading the plague by smearing a poisonous substance on walls). The essay denounces the torture used, and the absurdity of the time's criminal legislation, as well as superstition and ignorance. Manzoni took its inspiration from Pietro Verri's Notes on torture, and Cesare Beccaria's more extensive and more famous On Crimes and Punishments. The essay's intention was to underscore the individual responsibilities and the perverse passions of those magistrates who knew very well they were sentencing innocent persons to death. The Storia della colonna infame was highly regarded by French writers Alphonse de Lamartine and Augustin Thierry. It provided the source of inspiration for Leonardo Sciascia's novel Morte dell'Inquisitore.

== Adelchi and later works ==
In 1822, Manzoni had published his second tragedy, Adelchi, turning on the overthrow by Charlemagne of the Lombard domination in Italy, and containing many veiled allusions to the existing Austrian rule. Manzoni published together with the Adelchi his Discourse on a few items of Longobard history in Italy, the best of his historical essays. Both the Adelchi and Il Conte di Carmagnola were quickly translated and circulated in France, Germany, and England, and won Manzoni the praise of György Lukács, who considered him "the most important exponent of historical drama at the time in Western Europe".

In 1826, Manzoni befriended the Catholic philosopher Antonio Rosmini. The novelist maintained constant contact with the philosopher through correspondence and visits. Rosmini played the same role of confidant and critic in Manzoni's later life, that Fauriel had played during Manzoni's youth. His ties with Rosmini prompted Manzoni to devote himself to philosophical studies. After 1827, Manzoni wrote mainly essays on philosophy, history, politics and economics, literature, and above all language – most notably Sentir messa (1836), and the unfinished treatises Saggio comparativo sulla rivoluzione francese del 1789 e la rivoluzione italiana del 1859, begun in 1862, and Della lingua italiana, which were published posthumously.

== Politics and economics ==
Manzoni favored the Italian unification and on February 1860 was made a senator by the King of Italy Victor Emmanuel II. Before and after his embracing an austere Catholicism upon marrying Henriette Blondel, Manzoni's politics can be broadly described as progressive liberal. Since his French trip, Manzoni's liberalism included a profound understanding of economics. He was well acquainted with authors such as Jean-Baptiste Say and Adam Smith, and left numerous notes on the economic treatises and essays he was reading. His understanding of economics came to surface in his grand historical novel The Betrothed, particularly in Chapter 12, where he deals with the famine in Lombardy. Economist and future Italian President Luigi Einaudi praised the chapter and the whole of The Betrothed as "one of the best treatises on political economy ever written". Economic historian Deirdre N. McCloskey likewise described it as "a lecture in Economics 101".

== Family, death, and legacy ==
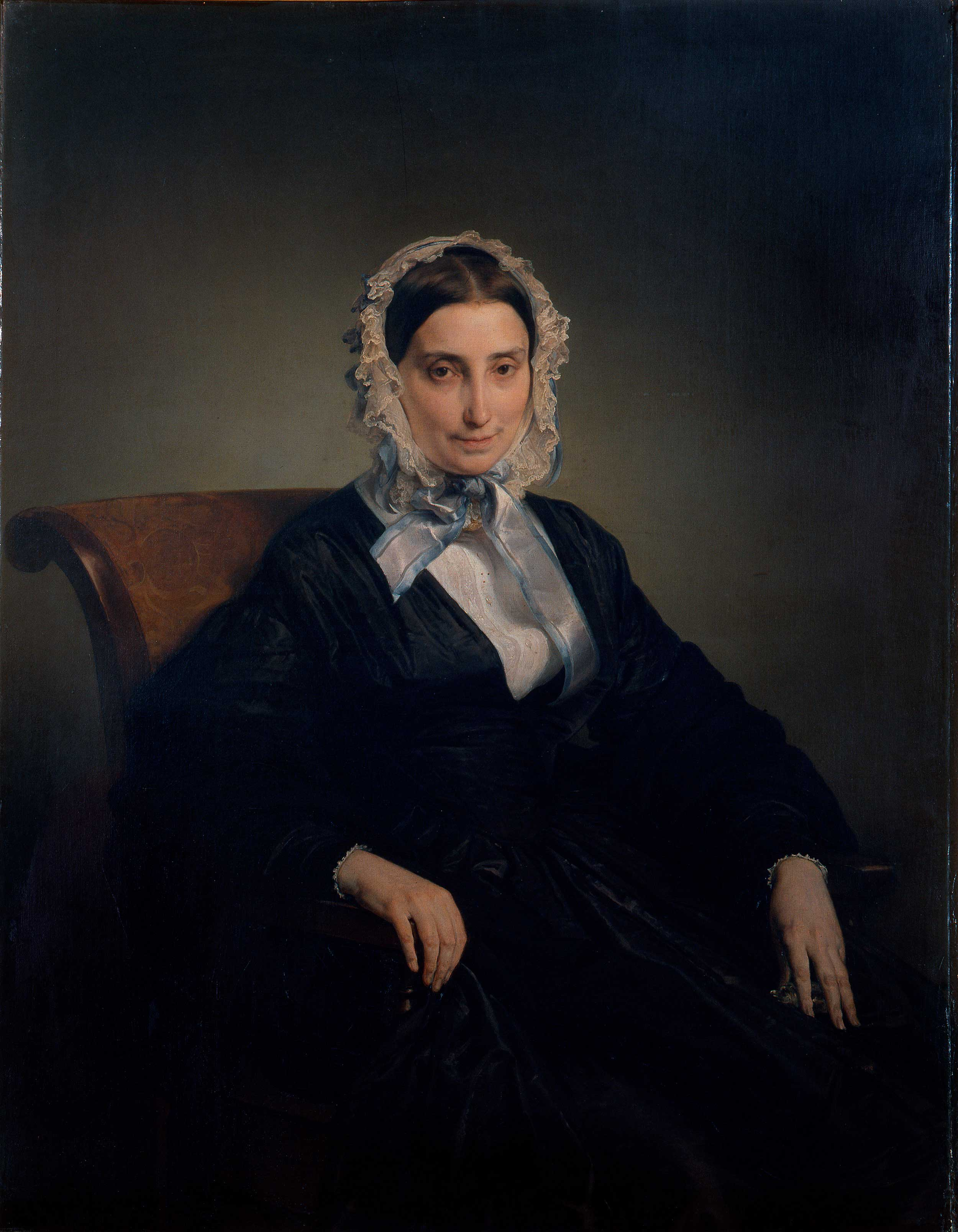
Portrait of Teresa Borri by Francesco Hayez

On 25 December 1833, Manzoni's wife Henriette died, a loss which was followed nine months later by the death of his eldest daughter, Giulietta, wife of Massimo d'Azeglio. In the mid-1830s, he attended the "Salotto Maffei", a salon in Milan hosted by Clara Maffei, and in 1837 married again, this time to Teresa Borri, widow of Count Decio Stampa. The new Mrs. Manzoni's nature was not the docile and conciliating one of Henriette, and she didn't get along very well either with her mother-in-law nor with step-children. In 1845, Teresa bore twins, one of whom was stillborn, and the other of whom lived only a few hours. In 1860, King Victor Emmanuel II named Manzoni a senator. Owing to his prestige in the field of studies on the problem of language, which had engaged his attention while he was writing the novel on up to his Lettera a Giacinto Carena sulla lingua italiana (Letter to Giacinto Carena on the Italian Language, 1846), Manzoni was appointed chairman of a commission dealing with this subject by the minister of public education, Emilio Broglio. In this capacity, he wrote the report Dell'unità della lingua e dei mezzi per diffonderla (On the Unity of the Language and on the Means for Achieving It, 1868), in which he proposed that Florentine should be taught in schools, and a modern Florentine dictionary published.

The death record of Manzoni

The report was published the same year in the March issue of the Nuova Antologia and in La Perseveranza of 5 March. The Minister of Education decided to adopt Manzoni's recommendations and under his auspices the Nuovo Vocabolario della lingua italiana was begun in accordance with Manzoni's criterion, namely the acceptance of the living usage of Florence. The last years of the writer's life were marred by the death of his mother (1841), his second wife (1861), six of his children, and his closest friends, Charles Fauriel (1844), Tommaso Grossi (1853), and Antonio Rosmini (1855). The death of his eldest son, Pier Luigi, on 28 April 1873, was the final blow which hastened his end. He was already weakened as he had fallen on 6 January while exiting the San Fedele church, hitting his head on the steps, and he died after 5 months of cerebral meningitis, a complication of the trauma. His funeral was celebrated in the Milan Cathedral with almost royal pomp. Manzoni's remains, after they lay in state for some days, were followed to the Monumental Cemetery of Milan by a vast cortege, including the royal princes and all the great officers of state.

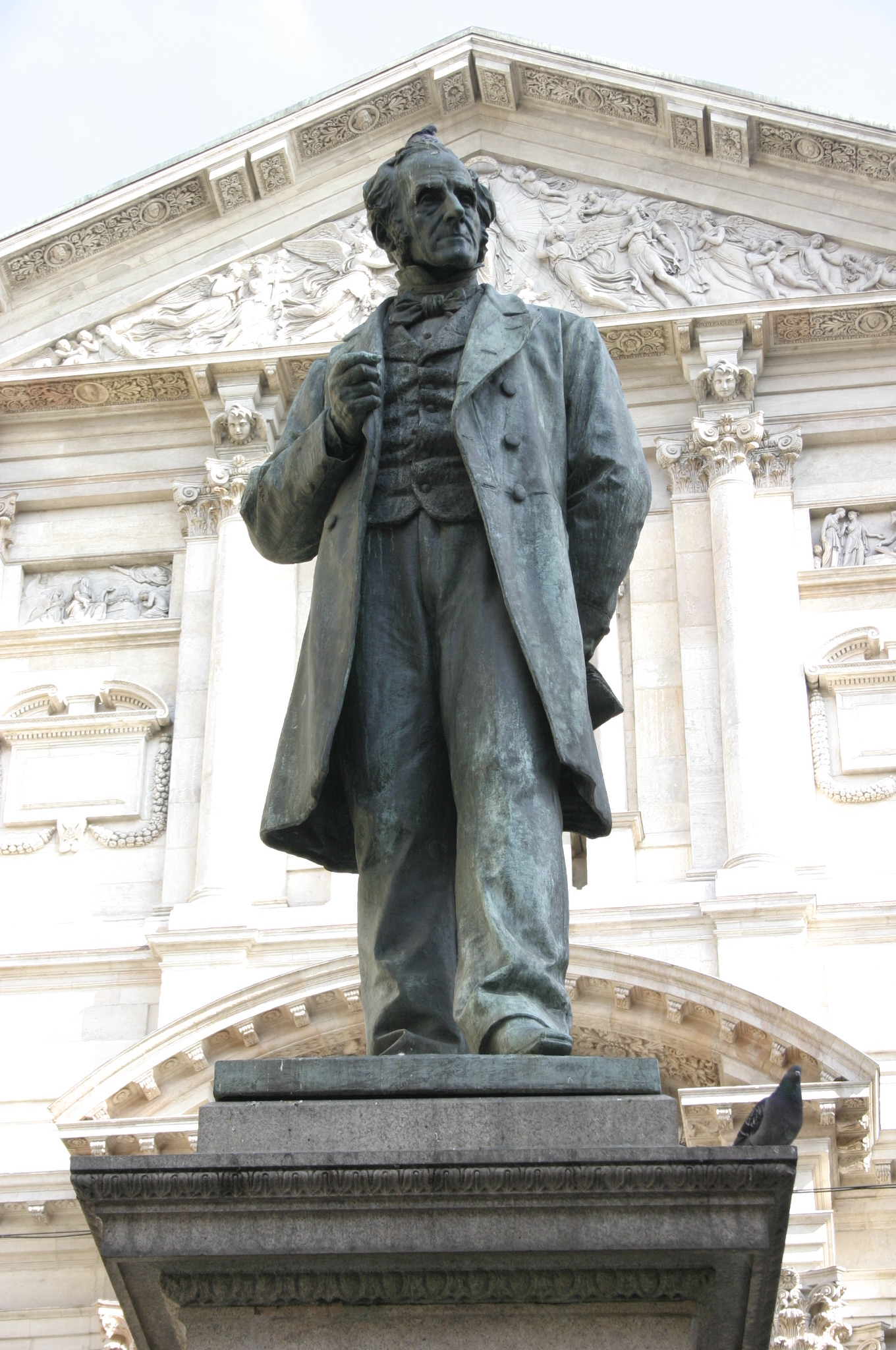
Monument to Manzoni in Piazza San Fedele, Milan

A monument to Manzoni by Francesco Barzaghi, was erected in the Piazza San Fedele in 1883; however, his noblest monument was Giuseppe Verdi's Requiem, written in 1874 to honour his memory. Natalia Ginzburg wrote a biographical study of Manzoni and his family based on Manzoni family letters (in Italian: La famiglia Manzoni, 1983; in English: The Manzoni Family, 1987). Manzoni was at first misunderstood by Catholic integralists due to his liberal leanings. In the wake of his death, such conservative publications as La Civiltà Cattolica, Scuola cattolica, and Osservatore cattolico ignored or criticized what was then regarded as his liberal ideology. Typical was the position of Davide Albertario, who in the Scuola cattolica of 29 May 1873 remarked that Manzoni had two faiths and two loves: "one in God and in the Church, the other in the revolution, enemy of God and the Church". Manzoni has since been revered as one of the most important modern Catholic authors. His treatise Osservazioni sulla morale cattolica was quoted by Pope Pius XI in his encyclical on Christian Education Divini illius Magistri:

"20. It is worthy of note how a layman, an excellent writer and at the same time a profound and conscientious thinker, has been able to understand well and express exactly this fundamental Catholic doctrine: 'The Church does not say that morality belongs purely, in the sense of exclusively, to her; but that it belongs wholly to her. She has never maintained that outside her fold and apart from her teaching, man cannot arrive at any moral truth; she has on the contrary more than once condemned this opinion because it has appeared under more forms than one. She does however say, has said, and will ever say, that because of her institution by Jesus Christ, because of the Holy Ghost sent her in His name by the Father, she alone possesses what she has had immediately from God and can never lose, the whole of moral truth, omnem veritatem, in which all individual moral truths are included, as well those which man may learn by the help of reason, as those which form part of revelation or which may be deduced from it.'"

Pope Francis loved Manzoni's masterpiece The Betrothed. First introduced to him by his grandmother, he stated to have read it at least three times during his life and asked engaged couples to read the novel for edification before marriage. Manzoni's works have exerted enormous influence on Italian culture. Giovanni Rosini and Cletto Arrighi borrowed his characters; Cesare Cantù, Cesare Balbo, Niccolò Tommaseo, and Massimo D'Azeglio adopted his Christian and conciliatory ideology, D'Azeglio's Ettore Fieramosca (1833) proving a best-seller. Numerous writers, among them Grossi, Rovani, Nievo, Verga, Fogazzaro, and subsequently Bacchelli, followed in his footsteps. Amilcare Ponchielli's first opera (1856) is based on Manzoni's novel The Betrothed. For literate Italians, Manzoni is a cultural titan akin to Dante Alighieri, Leopardi, Giuseppe Ungaretti and Giuseppe Verdi whose admiration of Manzoni led him to compose The Messa da Requiem in memorial. The language employed in his masterpiece, The Betrothed has shaped the language which, after the unification of Italy (1861), became the chief model of standard educated Italian. The Betrothed forms an indispensable part of the curriculum in Italian high schools, and has shaped Italians' ways of thinking, often in unconscious ways, more than any other novel. Verbal borrowings from it have become embedded in everyday language, as well as constantly resurfacing in films, books, and journalism.

== Nobility ==
On 23 February 1691, Pietro Antonio Manzoni, Alessandro's great-grandfather, purchased Moncucco, at that time an autonomous municipality, as a fief (created on that occasion and dependent on Mirasole, a farmstead-castle near Caltignaga), ensuring the noble title to his family of Signore di Moncucco di Mirasole (Lord of Moncucco of Mirasole). In 1753, the fief passed to his son Alessandro Valeriano and in 1773 to the latter's second-born son, Pietro (presumed father of Alessandro).

== See also ==
- Alessandro Manzoni's thought and poetics
- The Nun of Monza

== Bibliography ==
- One or more of the preceding sentences incorporates text from a publication now in the public domain: Chisholm, Hugh, ed. (1911). "Manzoni, Alessandro Francesco Tommaso Antonio". Encyclopædia Britannica. Vol. 17 (11th ed.). Cambridge University Press. pp. 626–627.
- Herbermann, Charles, ed. (1913). "Alessandro Manzoni" . Catholic Encyclopedia. New York: Robert Appleton Company.
- Pane, Remigio U. (1940). "The One Hundredth Anniversary of Alessandro Manzoni's I Promessi Sposi". Italica. 17 (4): 167–169. doi:10.2307/476496. JSTOR 476496.
- Orne, Jerrold (1941). "The Sources of "I Promessi Sposi"". Modern Philology. 38 (4): 405–420. doi:10.1086/388493. JSTOR 434119.
- De Simone, Joseph Francis (1946). Alessandro Manzoni. Esthetics and Literary Criticism. New York: S.F. Vanni.
- Reynolds, Barbara (1948). "Verdi and Manzoni: An Attempted Explanation". Music & Letters. 29 (1): 31–43. doi:10.1093/ml/29.1.31 (inactive 3 September 2025). JSTOR 730150.
- Wall, Bernard (1954). Alessandro Manzoni. Cambridge: Bowes & Bowes.
- Colquhoun, Archibald (1954). Manzoni and His Times. London: J. M. Dent & Sons Ltd.
- Zimmermann, Eléonore M. (1962). "Structural Patterns in Manzoni's I Promessi Sposi". Italica. 39 (3): 159–72. doi:10.2307/477067. JSTOR 477067.
- Peer, Larry H. (1972). "Schlegel, Christianity, and History: Manzoni's Theory of the Novel". Comparative Literature Studies. 9 (3): 266–82. JSTOR 40246018.
- Caserta, Ernesto G. (1973). "Manzoni's Aesthetic Theory". Comparative Literature Studies. 10 (3): 229–51. JSTOR 40468008.
- Chandler, S. B. (1973). "Passion, Reason and Evil in the Works of Alessandro Manzoni". Italica. 50 (4): 551–65. doi:10.2307/478372. JSTOR 478372.
- Chandler, S. B. (1974). Alessandro Manzoni: The Story of a Spiritual Quest. Edinburgh: Edinburgh University Press.
- Barricelli, Jean-Pierre (1976). Alessandro Manzoni. Boston: Twayne Publishers.
- Triolo, Franco (1978). "Manzoni and the dramatic aesthetics of European Romanticism". The Comparatist. 2: 23–52. JSTOR 44367142.
- Dombroski, Robert S. (1981). "The Ideological Question in Manzoni". Studies in Romanticism. 20 (4): 497–524. doi:10.2307/25600324. JSTOR 25600324.
- Alessandro Manzoni (1984). On the historical novel. Translated by Sandra Bermann. Lincoln: University of Nebraska Press. ISBN 0-8032-3084-2. OCLC 9575018.
- Lucente, Gregory L. (1986). "The Uses and the Ends of Discourse in I Promessi Sposi: Manzoni's Narrator, His Characters, and Their Author". Modern Language Notes. 101 (1): 51–77. doi:10.2307/2905516. JSTOR 2905516.
- Sante Matteo; Larry H. Peer, eds. (1986). The Reasonable Romantic: Essays on Alessandro Manzoni. New York: P. Lang.
- Illiano, Antonio (1990). "On Manzonis Disillusionment with Literature". Forum Italicum. 24 (1): 111–115. doi:10.1177/001458589002400112.
- Hilary, Richard B. (1991). "Manzoni's plague: bibliographic resources for a literary device". Romance Notes. 31 (3): 251–56. JSTOR 43802650.
- Citati, Pietro (1991). Manzoni. Milan: Mondadori. ISBN 978-8804346067.
- Davie, Mark (1992). "Manzoni after 1848: An 'Irresolute Utopian'?". Modern Language Review. 87 (4): 847–57. doi:10.2307/3731423. JSTOR 3731423.
- Gladfelder, Hal (1993). "Seeing Black: Alessandro Manzoni between Fiction and History". Modern Language Notes. 108 (1): 59–86. doi:10.2307/2904689. JSTOR 2904689.
- Macchia, Giovanni (1994). Manzoni e la via del romanzo. Milan: Adelphi. ISBN 9788845910524.
- Pierce, Glenn Palen (1998). Manzoni and the Aesthetics of the Lombard Seicento: Art Assimilated Into the Narrative of I Promessi Sposi. Lewisburg: Bucknell University Press. ISBN 9780838753675.
- Godt, Clareece (1998). The Mobile Spectacle: Variable Perspective in Manzoni's "I Promessi Sposi. New York: Peter Lang. ISBN 978-0820421346.
- Jones, Verina (2002). "Manzoni, Alessandro". The Oxford Companion to Italian Literature. Oxford: Oxford University Press.
- Alessandro Manzoni (2004). "Letter on Romanticism". Publications of the Modern Language Association of America. 119 (2). Translated by Joseph Luzzi: 299–316. doi:10.1632/003081204X22747.
- Boylan, Amy (2005). "The Betrothed". In Joyce Moss (ed.). World Literature and Its Times. Vol. 7: Italian Literature and Its Times. Detroit, MI: Thomson Gale. pp. 61–69.
- Codebò, Marco (2006). "Records, Fiction, and Power in Alessandro Manzoni's 'I Promessi Sposi' and 'Storia Della Colonna Infame". Modern Language Notes. 121 (1): 187–206. JSTOR 3840728.
- Floriani, Piero (2007). "MANZONI, Alessandro". Dizionario Biografico degli Italiani (in Italian). Vol. 69: Mangiabotti–Marconi. Rome: Istituto dell'Enciclopedia Italiana. ISBN 978-88-12-00032-6.
- Parisi, Luciano (2008). "Alessandro Manzoni's 'I Promessi Sposi': A Chaste Novel and an Erotic Palimpsest". Modern Language Review. 103 (2): 424–37. doi:10.1353/mlr.2008.0016. JSTOR 20467782.
- Nigro, Salvatore Silvano (2012). "Manzoni, Alessandro". Il Contributo italiano alla storia del Pensiero: Filosofia. Rome: Istituto dell'Enciclopedia Italiana.
- Giordano, Mario Gabriele (2013). "Manzoni, Alessandro". Il Contributo italiano alla storia del Pensiero - Storia e Politica. Rome: Istituto dell'Enciclopedia Italiana.
- Vettore, Enrico (2014). "Leonardo Sciascia and Alessandro Manzoni: Shared Morality, Shared Literary Destiny". Italica. 91 (3): 367–81. JSTOR 24368901.
- Trocchi, Denise (2015). ""Conquistato Conquistatore". I variegati rapporti tra Manzoni e il mondo anglosassone". Bibliomanie. Letterature, Storiografie, Semiotiche. 38 (7).
- Miller, Cecilia (2016). "The Betrothed (1825-1827, 1840-1842), Revolution, and the Perfectibility of the Human Mind". Enlightenment and Political Fiction: The Everyday Intellectual. New York and London: Routledge. pp. 206–259. doi:10.4324/9781315667072-6. ISBN 978-1-315-66707-2.
- Bloom, Harold (2020). The Bright Book of Life: Novels to Read and Reread. New York: Alfred A. Knopf. pp. 61–5.
- Pearce, Joseph (24 March 2022). "The Betrothed in a Nutshell". Crisis Magazine.
- Acocella, Joan (10 October 2022). "Italy's Great Historical Novel". The New Yorker.
- Camilletti, Fabio (2017). "Toward an Archeology of Italian Modernity". In Gabriella Romani, Jennifer Burns (ed.). The Formation of a National Audience in Italy, 1750–1890 (in Italian). Lanham: Fairleigh Dickinson University Press. ISBN 9781611478013.
