= Alessandro Manzoni's thought and poetics =

Thought and poetics of Alessandro Manzoni

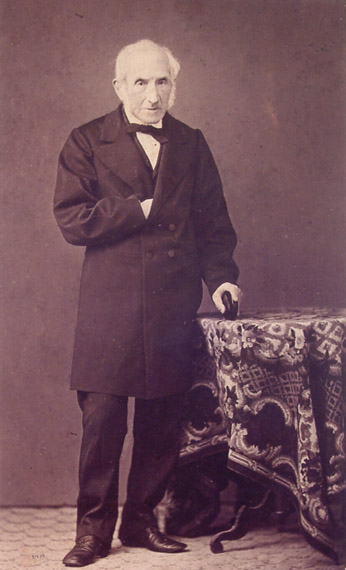
Image of Alessandro Manzoni

The thought and poetics of the Italian poet, novelist and philosopher Alessandro Manzoni encompass the entirety of the writer's poetic, stylistic, linguistic ideas and ideological convictions as they evolved from his Jacobin and neoclassical beginnings until his death. After the neoclassical period, which saw Manzoni engage in odes and other poetic production until 1810, he joined the Romantic movement from that year, becoming one of its leading exponents. During the so-called Quindicennio creativo ("Creative Fifteen Years", 1812–1827), Manzoni produced literary, poetic, theatrical, and nonfiction works that profoundly changed the genetics of Italian literature and his own literary language, imposing himself as a milestone in the history of Italian literature. Between 1827 and his death in 1873, Manzoni continued his research, writing historical-literary essays in contrast to his early ones and, at the same time, reflecting on the nature of the "living" Italian language in the context of the new Kingdom of Italy.

== Enlightenment and neoclassical beginnings ==
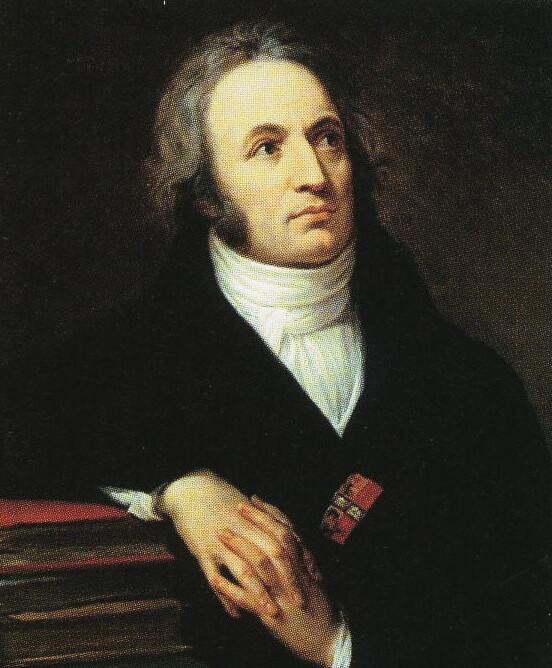
Andrea Appiani, Vincenzo Monti, oil on canvas, 1809, Pinacoteca di Brera, Milan

At the schools of the Somaschi and Barnabite priests, Manzoni received a classical education, based on the study of the great Latin and Italian classics: Virgil, Horace, Petrarch and Dante were among the most studied authors, and the neoclassicism then prevailing in Italian literary culture fostered its rooting in the students' souls. The young Manzoni admired the two greatest exponents of neoclassical culture: Giuseppe Parini, whose death he was greatly affected by, and Vincenzo Monti, who visited the students at the Longone boarding school, absorbing from them the poetic stylistic features that would distinguish his poetry throughout the early 1800s, from Trionfo della Libertà to Urania. The relationship with Monti, from a human and poetic point of view, is fully seen in a letter dated September 15, 1803, in which the young Manzoni submits literary material to him:

You [Monti] have repeatedly reproached me as lazy, and praised me as a good poet. To show you that I am neither one nor the other, I send you these verses. But the main purpose of them is to remind you of my high esteem for you, your promise, and the desire with which I am waiting for you [...] At the very least I dare to beg you to tell me your opinion of them, and to note their greatest vices. That if you judge them not wholly incorrigible, I shall see to employ within them the file, from which they are nevertheless untouched.

— Epistolario, 1, p. 9)

Despite these encounters with Monti, little of neoclassicism remains in Manzoni's poetics. Strongly imbued with the tradition of the Lombard Enlightenment (Manzoni was a nephew, on Giulia Beccaria's side, of the well-known jurisconsult Cesare), Manzoni, following the formation of Jacobin circles in Milan and contact with the more radical Enlightenment tradition, (Note: Caretti, p. 15) reports in relation to the Lombard Enlightenment atmosphere of the 1890s: Having waned, in fact, the primitive Enlightenment optimism... Lombard intellectuality, towards the end of the eighteenth century, had suddenly found itself in crisis: on the one hand, yielding to a kind of disarmed perplexity, of bewildered paralysis; on the other hand, exploding, especially as regards the younger Lombards (including Manzoni himself), into sudden libertarian flames.) adhered until the last years of the first decade of the nineteenth century to an Enlightenment skepticism in the field of religion (associated with the negative existential experience he received at boarding school), in which the value for freedom advocated by revolutionary ideals predominated. Decisive for this turning point was his meeting in Milan with the Neapolitan exiles Vincenzo Cuoco (who introduced him to Vico's philosophical thought) and Francesco Lomonaco; in Paris, from 1805 onward, with the group of Idéologues headed by Pierre de Cabanis and Claude Fauriel, intellectuals who were spokesmen for the Enlightenment sensist heritage and headed by Helvétius, Condillac, Voltaire and Rousseau and attentive to certain social demands.

== Between Enlightenment and Romanticism ==
=== After the conversion ===
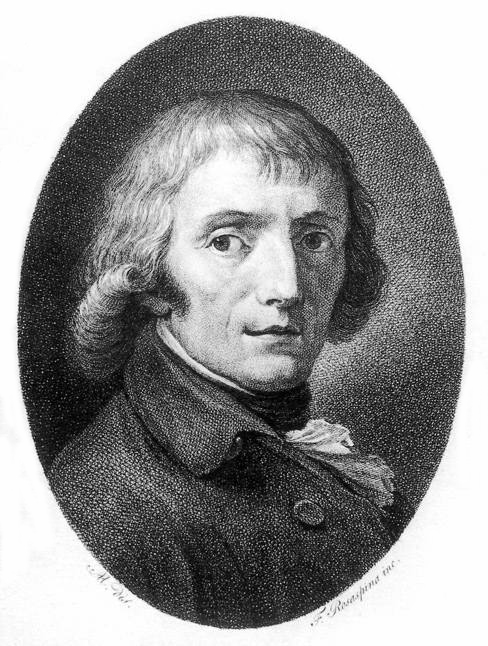
Francesco Rosaspina, Giuseppe Parini, 18th-century lithograph. Parini, along with the Lombard Enlightenment tradition, were fundamental to the development of Manzoni's civil literature, a contribution that did not cease (but was accentuated) after Manzoni's conversion to Romanticism.

Following his conversion in 1810, Manzoni broke with part of the secular culture heir to the Enlightenment, while maintaining its more moderate aspects. Manzoni's poetic-literary parabola, as with other Italian Romantics, did not lean toward a total break with the 18th-century Enlightenment tradition. On the contrary, after his contact with Fauriel and the other idéologues, Manzoni did indeed absorb those characteristic traits proper to the nascent Romanticism (attention to nature, the world of the "small," emotional spontaneity), but he filtered them with the paideutic-educational contributions proper to the teachings of Parini, his grandfather Cesare Beccaria and Pietro Verri. To all this was added the rediscovery of Christian ethics, entailing the poetic chorality and divine omnipresence in the soul of Creation that does not nullify, but strengthens in Manzoni the bond between Enlightenment reason (which failed, after the revolutionary and Napoleonic experiences) and the believer's need to rely on the One who rules the world.

=== Manzonian Enlightenment: from Jacobin beginnings to the Letter on Romanticism ===
Following from his youth canons of the Milanese Enlightenment and the Accademia dei Trasformati, (Note: Parini's influence on Manzoni's early production is reflected in the ode In morte di Carlo Imbonati, in which similarities echo with the moral exhortation expounded by Parini in the ode Sull'educazione, dedicated precisely to Imbonati, who was a pupil of the Brianza poet. Cf. Langella, pp. 41–53).) Manzoni also became a spokesman for the figure of the civically engaged intellectual, emphasizing the ethical aspect that the scholar can take on within the civil community: the latter must collaborate with government on the path of reform to improve the condition of the people, as Parini had done forty years earlier. (Note: Caretti, p. 13): Rather, I would call attention to the constant fervor with which those ideas were felt by Lombard intellectuals, the active energy with which they sought to translate them into well-defined works of militant literature (didactic and educational), into legal and political institutions informed by the new principles, into administrative reforms, into school curricula; in short, I would say to look, in particular, at the eminently ethical-pragmatic nature of eighteenth-century Milanese culture...) This kind of morally committed literature can be seen in a letter sent to Fauriel in 1806, where a very young Manzoni complains about the state of decadence of Italian society, something for which "Writers cannot produce the effect that they (I mean the good ones) propose, that is, to educate the multitude, to make them enamored of what is beautiful and useful, and to make things in this way a little more as they should be." This civil and moral conception of literature, in addition to the poetic evidence of the Civil Odes of 1814 and 1821, is revived in the more mature Letter on Romanticism sent to Marquis Cesare d'Azeglio (1823), in which Manzoni reiterates the social value that a work of literary art must have as its main purpose:

...I shall confine myself to expounding to you what seems to me the general principle to which all particular sentiments on the positive romantic can be reduced. The principle of necessity all the more indeterminate as it is extended, seems to me to be this: that poetry, and literature in general should propose to itself usefulness for its purpose, truth for its subject, and interestingness for its means.

— A. Manzoni, Lettera al marchese d'Azeglio

=== Romantic influence ===
The Romantic element in Manzoni's poetic production emerges, for the first time, in the Sacred Hymns, where the poet's ego eclipses in favor of a choral universality that raises his cry of hope and trust to God. The Romantic conversion, as critic Ezio Raimondi points out, stems from his conversion to Catholicism, a factor that "obliges Manzoni to make a radical choice even with regard to poetry," bringing about a change of course from the neoclassicism of Urania.

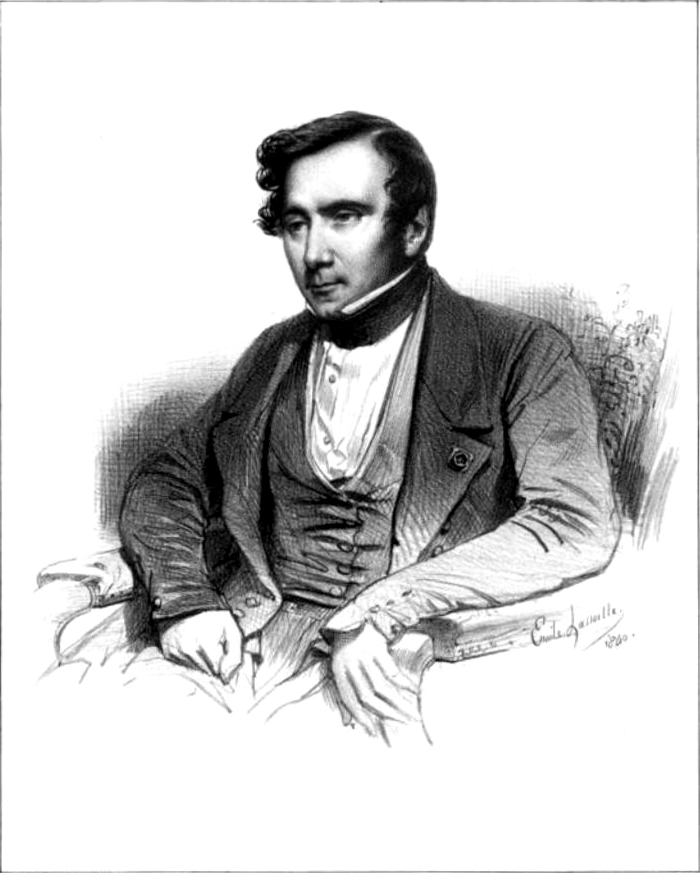
Émile Lassalle, portrait of Augustin Thierry (1795-1856), 1840

==== History ====
In addition to the "ecclesial" dimension of Manzoni's religiosity, one cannot forget the fundamental contribution of the French historiography of Fauriel and other ideologues. Indeed, these advocated a history no longer centered on the great men of history, but rather on the humble, the small ones who are lost in the oblivion of time because they are not the object of interest by their contemporary chroniclers and are the object of violence by the decisions of the powerful. The same is true, accordingly, for historical facts: the acquaintance with Augustin Thierry, which took place in Paris between 1819 and 1820, "represents for Manzoni the sample of documentary and philological research, for the most part destined to the discovery of the social history that was set to be a fascinating intellectual novelty." The same is true for the historical facts. Such "social history," investigated through the historical-philological method of the ideologues and expressed in the Discorso sulla storia longobardica in Italia, the real historical basis for the drama of Adelchi, will later find its highest expression in Fermo e Lucia and then in The Betrothed.

For Manzoni, history has a sacred value: it must not be altered on the basis of the necessity of poetic ingenuity, but must coexist with the latter without altering the proper turn of events. As he would declare in his Letter to Monsieur Chauvet:

...The essence of poetry does not consist in inventing facts. This kind of invention is as easy and as insignificant as the work of the mind, and requires very little reflection and even very little imagination. Therefore creations of this kind are multiplying more than ever: while all the great poetic monuments have as their basis events taken from history, or... from what was once regarded as history.

— Manzoni, scritti di teoria letteraria, p. 109)

==== The poetic object: the poetic truth and the historical truth ====
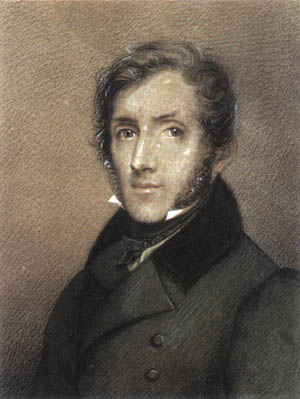
Carlo Gerosa, Portrait of Alessandro Manzoni, 1835

At the same time, however, Manzoni's poetic statement is not intended to diminish the value of poetic ingenuity. In fact, a little later in the discussion, Manzoni poses the hypothetical question of what might be left for the poet if the inventio of creating the substrate of the story is taken away from him, giving as his answer his definition of what poetry was:

...the poetry: yes, the poetry. For, in the end, what does history give us? It gives us events that, so to speak, are known only in their externals: it gives us what men did. But what they thought, the feelings that accompanied their decisions and their plans, their successes and their setbacks; the speeches by which they made their passions and their wills prevail, or tried to make them prevail, over other passions or other wills, by which they expressed their anger, gave vent to their sadness, by which, in a word, they revealed their personalities: all this, or almost all of it, history overlooks in silence; and all this is instead the domain of poetry.

— Manzoni, scritti di teoria letteraria, pp. 111–112)

With such a declaration of poetics, Manzoni definitively delineates the boundary separating the two areas that the poet must deal with and that will be the basis of the novel: the poetic truth and the historical truth. The former "must inquire into the feelings with which men experience events and into those aspects of history which escape true and proper historiography." The latter, is the historical material, objectively true and historically investigable, the "truth by subject" recalled in the Letter on Romanticism.

If the subject, then, must be the truth, there can be no room for the mythology hitherto used in the field of poetry. (Note: Manzoni, shortly before, had recalled that the Greeks, whose use of mythology by today's poets was condemned as a falsification of history according to the tools of modern research, regarded myths (whose Greek word, mythos, means precisely "true") as true history: The Greek poets drew their topics, with all the most important episodes of them, from national traditions. They did not invent events; they accepted them as contemporaries had transmitted them; they accepted, respected history as individuals, peoples, times, had made it. — Manzoni, scritti di teoria letteraria, p. 109)) Not only because this would contradict the principles just before expressed about historical truth, but the very ethical-religious basis of one who professes to be a Christian, as Cesare Goffis notes regarding the young Manzoni's change of opinion toward Urania.

Anne Louise Germaine de Staël, On the Method and Utility of Translations, in "Biblioteca Italiana", January 1816

=== Manzoni and Italian Romanticism ===
==== The dispute between Romantics and Classicists ====
The years following the conversion were very significant for the Italian literary and cultural landscape. Italy, still anchored in a firm classicist tradition thanks to the past teachings of authors such as Parini and Alfieri, and contemporary ones such as Monti's, was forced to confront the new European Romantic temperament. In January 1816, the French intellectual Madame de Staël published, translated by Pietro Giordani in the first issue of the literary journal the Biblioteca Italiana, an article entitled Sulla maniera e la utilità delle traduzioni, in which she attacked the Italians' stubborn adherence to vacuous rhetoric, ignoring instead the literary novelties coming from Germany and England. In the subsequent dispute between classicists (led by Pietro Giordani) and romantics (including Ludovico di Breme and Giovanni Berchet), Manzoni did not actively participate. Although he was openly on the side of the Romantics (the ode L'ira di Apollo testifies, in an ironic key, to the wrath of the pagan god of poetry for being excluded from the poetic texts) and participated in the Cameretta letteraria organized by Ermes Visconti, Gaetano Cattaneo, Tommaso Grossi and, above all, the dialectal poet Carlo Porta, Manzoni refused to collaborate openly with both the Biblioteca Italiana and the successor to the first magazine, Il Conciliatore. In addition to his ever-growing interest in formulating a Christian poetics and the beginning of investigations into the theatrical genre, the depressive neurosis that struck Manzoni, for the first time, in 1810 (on the occasion of the loss of Enrichetta) and, in an increasingly debilitating way, in the following years, were also decisive: agoraphobic disorders, panic attacks, fainting spells and difficulty speaking in public had undermined his interpersonal relationships, forcing him to a quiet and withdrawn life in his estates in Brusuglio or in the quiet of his Milanese palace.

==== Relationships with Porta and the Cameretta ====
Throughout the 1810s, until Porta's sudden death, Manzoni was thus not the only exponent of Italian Romanticism. The popularizing and critical dynamism of Ludovico di Breme and the prolixity with which Porta expressed the heart of the Milanese people in his dialect, without forgetting the theorist of the Romantic group revolving around the Conciliatore, Ermes Visconti, were alongside Manzoni's creative laboratory.

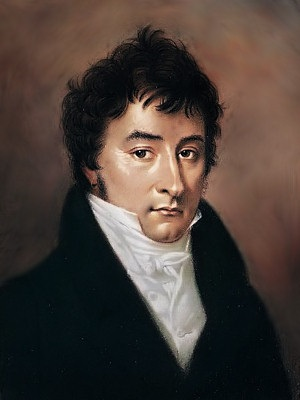
Portrait of the Milanese poet Carlo Porta (1774-1821), in a pastel by Bruni (1821), reported in Raffaello Barbiera, Carlo Porta e la sua Milano, G. Barbera, Florence 1921

The latter had, despite the health problems outlined earlier, bonds of esteem with Lombard Romantics, especially those intellectuals who used to frequent Carlo Porta at his home: Gaetano Cattaneo, Giovanni Torti, Tommaso Grossi, Luigi Rossari and the painter and writer Giuseppe Bossi. It was Bossi who introduced Manzoni to these intellectuals, but the author of the Sacred Hymns, although maintaining friendly relations with them, never officially joined the group, especially because of the linguistic-literary project pursued by Porta, antithetical to Manzoni's linguistic research and never appreciated by Manzoni. The most explanatory judgment on Porta can be found in his letter of January 29, 1821, sent to Fauriel in which, among other things, the departure of the dialect poet and his legacy is also recalled:

You will find a small speech by Mr. Grossi announcing the loss we have just had of Mr. Porta. His admirable talent, which he perfected from day to day, and which he had no shortage of exercising in a language cultivated to please anyone who possesses it as a native speaker, made him mourned by all his fellow-citizens; the memory of his qualities is for all his friends a cause of even more painful sorrow.
Vous trouverez un petit discours de M. Grossi qui vous announcera la perte que nous venons de faire de M. porta. Son talent admirable, et qui se perfectionnait de jour en jour, et à qui il n'a manqué que de l'exercer dans une langue cultivée pour placer celui qui la possède absolument dans les premiers rangs le fait regretter par tous ses concitoyens; le souvenir de ses qualités est pour ses amis une cause de regrets encore plus douloureux.

— Manzoni, lettere, p. 323)

==== The rise of "Manzonian" Romanticism ====
Porta's death was not the only blow that Lombard Romanticism suffered during that period. Il Conciliatore, whose articles increasingly took on a liberal political tone, was closed in the fall of 1819. The deaths of Ludovico di Breme (August 15, 1820), considered the "bridge" between Lombard and European Romanticism, and Porta (January 5, 1821) deprived Lombard Romanticism of two very important literary figures. Finally, the repression of the Carbonari uprisings of 1820-1821 saw some "romantics" involved: Giovanni Berchet, forced into exile to avoid falling into the hands of the Austrian police, and Silvio Pellico, imprisoned in the Spielberg. The vacuum generated left only Manzoni, by now on the road to the novel, and some members of the old chamber, such as Tommaso Grossi, who would become a close friend of Manzoni and whose literary fortunes he would attempt to follow. The exhaustion of the Classical-Romantic polemic and the gradual establishment of Manzonian-style Romanticism in the 1920s would determine an unambiguous course of Lombard literature of that period.

== Manzonian Catholicism ==
=== Religion and existential "pessimism" ===
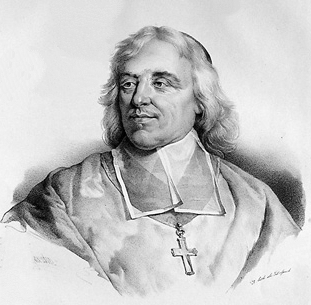
Jacques-Bénigne Bossuet (1627 - 1704) was one of the most important French preachers of the grand siècle, one of the fundamental models for the religiosity of Manzoni.

Having lost, at the beginning of the nineteenth century, hope of attaining serenity by means of reason, life and history seemed to him romantically immersed in a vain, painful, inexplicable disorder: it was necessary to find a redeeming purpose that could help man both to constitute an ethical code to practice in earthly life and to endure the evils of the world in anticipation of heavenly peace. Critic Alessandro Passerin d'Entrèves stresses the importance that Blaise Pascal and the great French moralists of the seventeenth century (Bossuet) had in Manzoni's religious training: from them the author had drawn the ambition to know the human soul and "the conviction that Christianity is the only possible explanation of human nature, that it was the Christian religion that revealed man to man," finding in their teachings the trust in religion as an instrument of enduring human unhappiness. Gino Tellini sums up Manzoni's conception of religiosity in a very explanatory way:

The certainty of a saving grace that postpones to the hereafter the reward for the unjust sufferings endured in the world is not enough for Manzoni. Instead, he senses the need, here and now, for an objective yardstick of judgment, like a handhold of salvation on this earth: hence the need to establish an absolute system of ethical values that serves as a guide and at the same time as a rigorous yardstick for evaluating every human action.

— Tellini, p. 109)

=== Manzoni's and Leopardi's pessimism compared ===
Trust in God is the point of departure from the pessimism advocated by Giacomo Leopardi. Both writers are assertors of the violence that befalls man in the course of his existence, but the difference revolves around the ultimate hope to which man is destined: if for Leopardi, as explicated in Dialogue of Nature and an Icelander, the existential cycle of the world is destined to resolve itself into a mechanical cycle of destruction and death, (Note: Nature, faced with the existential complaints of the Icelander, responds cynically with these words, explicating Leopardi's cosmic pessimism: "You show that you have not borne in mind that the life of this universe is a perpetual circuit of production and destruction, both connected to each other in such a way that each serves continuously to the other, and to the preservation of the world; which always, if either of them ceases, would likewise come to dissolution. Therefore it would result to his detriment if there were in him anything free from affliction.") Manzoni manages not to fall into this "cosmic" pessimism due to the trust he places in divine Providence. Carlo Bo summarizes this pessimism in a few lines:

Another point of possible comparison with Leopardi - for he, yes, is an inventor of recipes on man's unhappiness -: Manzoni is not affirmative, yet where the wave of emotion seems to hold him, here he does not take away the light of our invincible fragility and of the struggle, from the fight that takes place within us between good and evil.

— Bo, pp. 22–23)

Some verses and stylistic choices of All Saints, a Manzonian fragment from 1847 and the last of the Sacred Hymns (albeit unfinished), have been contrasted with the final image of Leopardi's La Ginestra:

Manzoni, Ognissanti, vv. 17-28 He asks, disdainful,
Why on the inhospitable soils,
At the breath of wild breezes,
It makes the trembling flower rise, That unfolds before Him alone
The pomp of the snow-white veil,
That scatters to the deserts of heaven
The odours of the chalice, and dies.
And you who, so long, through blind paths
Of funereal flattery
Running to the abyss,
Fell into the lap of an immense pity [...]

Leopardi, La ginestra o il fiore del deserto, vv. 297-301; 304-317

And you, gentle broom,
who adorn this despoiled countryside
with fragrant thickets,
you too will soon succumb to the cruel power
of the subterranean fire
[...]
And you’ll bow
beneath its mortal flow without a struggle
your innocent head:
but a head not bent in vain
cowardly begging before
a future oppressor; nor raised
with insane pride to the stars,
nor above the desert, where
where your home and birthplace were
not through choice but chance:
far wiser and much less
fallible than man, since you never believed
that your frail species
could, by fate or yourself, become immortal.

Leopardi's flower symbolizes the heroism of living beings without any final hope, while Manzoni's flower, abandoned in the deserts, always hopes, however, for the final intervention of the resolving Grace, in historical events (the providential misfortune) and beyond, so the broom is lost in nothingness while Manzoni's "tremulous flower" is symbolic of those who encounter divine mercy that saves them from the torments of existence.

=== Providence: from the Fifth of May to the Betrothed ===
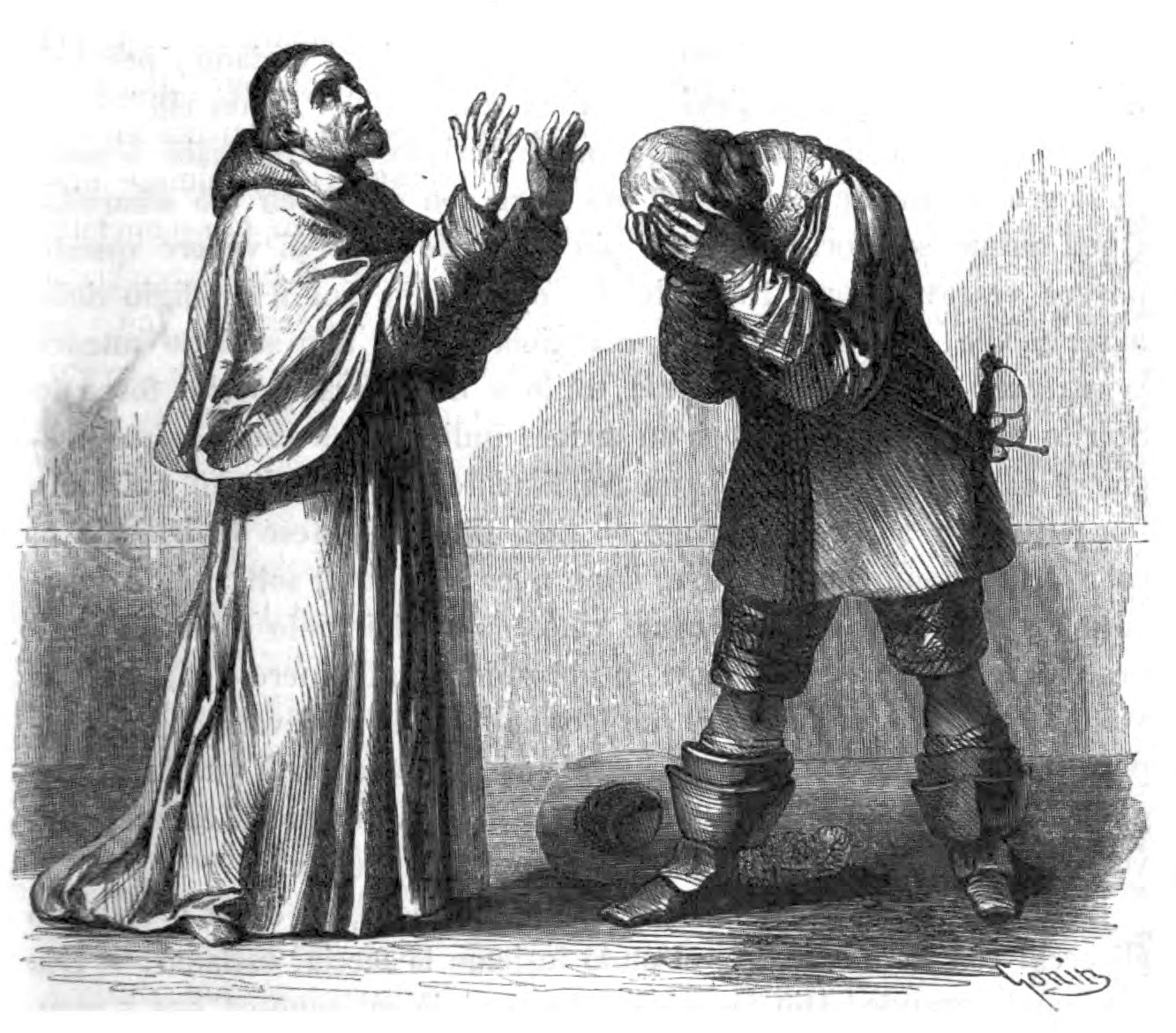
Francesco Gonin, Cardinal Federigo and the Unnamed, chapter XXIII of The Betrothed (1840)

The concept of Providence, i.e., the hand of God regulating history by inducing the hearts of men to conversion and a manifestation of the Divine learned from Bousset, is already openly manifested in the economy of Cinque Maggio. After outlining Napoleon's arrogance, Manzoni abruptly moves on to his downfall (a Magnificat "backwards"), (Note: The Magnificat hymn is in Lc 1,52: "he has overthrown the mighty from their thrones, he has lifted up the lowly." Napoleon's story fits into this Magnificat perspective, but backwards, in that from glory he falls into the dust of poverty.) offering the reader a desolate, afflicted, depressed soul who manages to live only in his Memoirs, which, however, fail to lift him up. Eventually "a valid hand came from Heaven" (vv. 87-88), which rescues Napoleon and brings him to rest in the peace of Paradise. Although some scholars have "criticized" this final intervention of God as a forced testimony of the author's Catholicism, in reality it is also a matter of responding to internal resonances: the weary hand of Napoleon is joined by the "valid hand" of God, "merciful" (v.90). From this it can be concretely inferred what Providential misfortune is: the apparent misfortune that may befall a person's life is not necessarily coming to harm, but may be the means of stimulating someone to conversion (Napoleon) or to the peace of the righteous (Ermengarda). In Napoleon's case, the fall from grace, sorrow and finally death are the fertile ground through which Napoleon understands his mistakes, and can redeem himself in the depths of his consciousness before God.

The mechanism is the same in both the Adelchi and the novel. In the former, the death that overtakes first Ermengarda, and then Adelchi, is a "liberating" death from the pains of this world, so that they can fully relish their thirst for peace and justice after death, freeing themselves from their hostile world and winning the palm of martyrdom as victims. (Note: In the very Choir of Act IV, in vv. 85-120, Manzoni outlines, relating to Ermengarda's death, what the providential misfortune consists of (vv. 103-108): "Thee did providence place / Misfortune in among the oppressed: / Die mournful and placid; / Go down to sleep with them: / To the blamed ashes / None shall insult.") In Fermo e Lucia first, and in The Betrothed later, the mechanism is always the same: Friar Christopher becomes religious and is converted from the sin of pride after the murder of his rival; Sister Gertrude atones for her crimes after suffering the punishments inflicted on her by Cardinal Borromeo. Above all, however, the closeness to Napoleon's experience consists in the tragedy of the Unnamed: he, after a life of false glories, feels death approaching, and his conscience torments him, setting before him the possibility of God's judgment on his crimes. The moral distress, explicated in the terrible night, will later be appeased by the Christian charity of Federigo Borromeo, who will act as God's "valid hand" in a heart torn apart by evil, but already protracted toward conversion.

However, the issue of Providence outlined by Manzoni is quite different from that presented by his characters: none of them (except Friar Christopher and the Cardinal) clearly defines how God works in the story, moving from at least acceptable interpretations (the vow to Our Lady that Lucia makes while imprisoned by the Unnamed, and her liberation glimpsed as a sign of divine benevolence) to the blasphemous ones of Don Abbondio (the plague is seen as a providential "great broom") and Don Gonzalo de Cordoba who, faced with the advance of the plague brought by the Landsknechts, says that Providence will take care of everything. (Note: Parisi also mentions this in Parisi-Provvidenza, pp. 103–104)) Thus there is a plurality of visions, which take away from The Betrothed the epithet Epic of Providence, since the author barely mentions it. It is only at the end of the novel that the true face of divine Providence emerges, (Note: In Chapter XXXIV, when Renzo tells his children how, in order to stay out of trouble, it was necessary not to expose oneself to dangerous situations, Lucia counters that she too, like Renzo, had to endure quite a lot of harassment from the powerful, without having sought it. After a long debate and search together, they concluded that trouble does indeed come often, because one has given cause for it; but that the most cautious and most innocent conduct is not enough to keep it away; and that when it comes, through fault or no fault, trust in God softens it, and makes it useful for a better life — Manzoni, The Betrothed, cap. XXXIV) a discovery that illuminates the reality of God's action in History and prompted Parisi to "redefine" the epithet of Manzoni's work:

It could be said, in this sense, that The Betrothed is the novel of faith in Providence, rather than the novel of Providence...

— Luciano Parisi, Il tema della Provvidenza, cit., p. 100

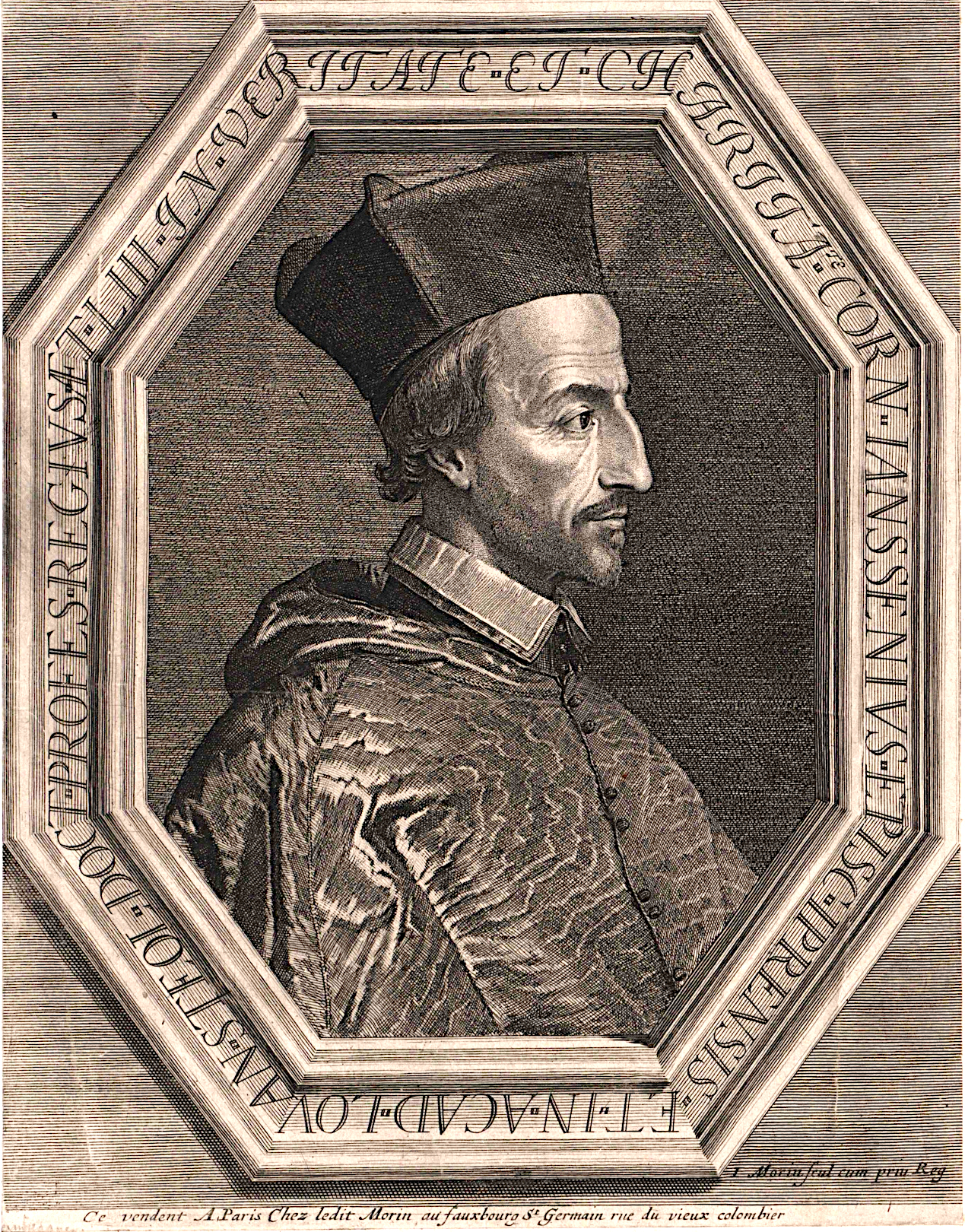
Bishop Cornelius Jansen, in an engraving by Jean Morin (17th century). With his Augustinus (published posthumously in 1640), the Dutch bishop sought a compromise between Catholic faith and Calvinist morality, provoking violent reactions from the Tridentine Catholic hierarchy.

=== Manzoni and Jansenism ===
The influence Degola and Tosi had on Manzoni's conversion to Catholicism was undeniably important: from the two prelates, Alessandro and the rest of the family adopted Jansenist tendencies that led them to the strict interpretation of Catholic religion and morality. In addition to the severity the poet imposed on himself, the constant reference to divine Grace aroused, in most Catholic circles that were his contemporaries, perplexity about his religious orthodoxy. The problem was then re-proposed by Senator Francesco Ruffini in La vita religiosa di Alessandro Manzoni, in which he emphasised that he also adhered to Jansenism in a "theological" and not just an "ethical" way, a conclusion also reached by Adolfo Omodeo and Arturo Carlo Jemolo. Manzoni adopted Jansenist morals, but remained an orthodox Catholic in dogma. As Giuseppe Langella points out, on the fundamental question of Grace, "Manzoni adheres unreservedly to the official teaching of the Church, relies on the apostolic exhortation of Mt 7:7-8 'patite, et dabitur vobis'... No discrimination, then, in the merciful offer of grace. Manzoni is peremptory: divine help is not denied to anyone who asks for it...". The same for Luciano Parisi, who points out Manzoni's fidelity to the hierarchy and the teachings of the Church, such as when he learned of the proclamation of the dogma of Papal Infallibility at the First Vatican Council in 1870. Cesare Cantù reports Manzoni's reflection on the matter:

Who ever doubted that Leo X was infallible in the bull against Luther? Even opponents recognize that the pope is a bishop like any other, but with a few more things. Now this something extra is, and can only be, infallibility. To apply it to all acts and sayings of the pope is an exaggeration, and every exaggeration is doomed to die, because it detaches itself from the truth of the Church...

—

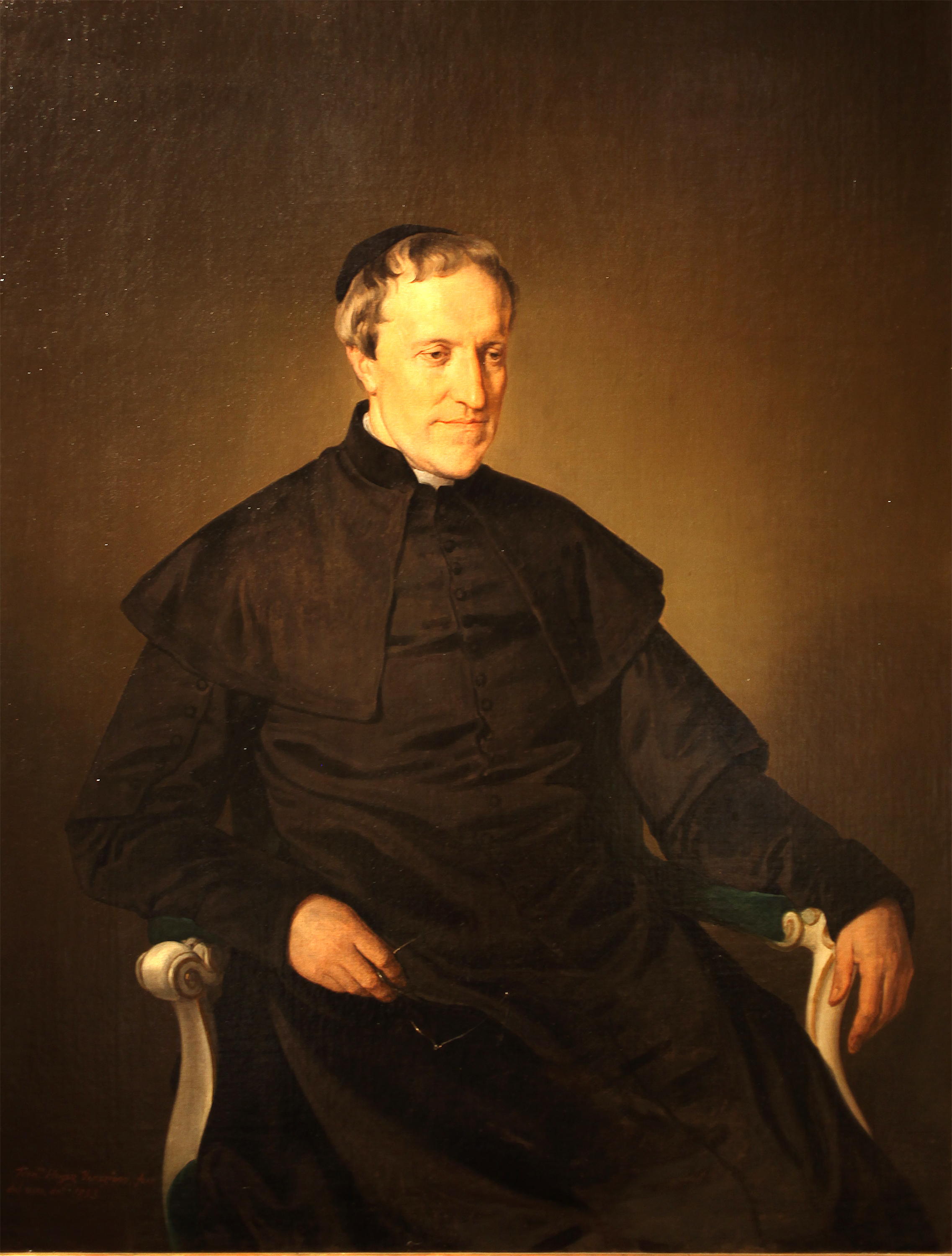
Francesco Hayez, Portrait of Antonio Rosmini, 1853-1856, oil on canvas, Galleria d'Arte Moderna, Milan. Along with Manzoni, of whom he was a friend, Rosmini is the highest representative of liberal Catholicism.

=== Liberal Catholicism ===
Manzoni, while being faithful to the dogmas of the Church even in his Jansenist leanings, always kept himself far from the fringe of reactionary Catholicism that intended to offer total and decisive resistance to the novelties of the modern world and to restore the moral and political supremacy of the clergy, as Joseph de Maistre intended in his Du Pape. On the contrary, Manzoni, who had already shown, in 1817, a strong impatience with the link between the Papacy and the powers of the Conservative Order with a momentary cooling of his faith, could not accept the disavowal of the value of reason and the role of the Holy See in the political field. Therefore, with the development of the Risorgimento movement and the development, even in other European countries, of Catholic currents opposed to the reactionary ideology, (Note: The movement of European liberal Catholicism has its roots, primarily, in France and Italy. The first to "officially" initiate this current within the Church was the former reactionary Félicité de Lamennais (1782-1854) who, with his 1829 Des progrès de la Revolution et de la guerre contre l'Eglise, sponsored its birth: The Breton abbot, in his Des progrès de la Revolution et de la guerre contre l'Eglise of 1829, to be considered in many ways the birth certificate of liberal Catholicism, by accentuating the concept of the Church's independence from the state, had come to argue that the complete restoration of Catholicism had to be implemented by means of freedom, without the support, however risky, of state power. — De Gregorio, pp. 21–22)) Manzoni came to the conclusion that:

...the church was not to stand in opposition to the contemporary historical movement leading peoples to the construction of liberal-constitutional nation-states [...] To them [liberal Catholics] the task of political authority was not only to guarantee religious freedom, but also to protect and foster all expressions of Catholicism in civil life...

— Filoramo-Menozzi, pp. 144–145)

From this it can be understood how a devout man such as Manzoni, by now a symbol of the linguistic unity of United Italy and a senator of the Kingdom, voted in 1864 for the transfer of the capital from Florence to Rome, once it was freed from the temporal power of Pope Pius IX, and accepted in 1872 the honorary citizenship of the Eternal City.

== Manzonian theater ==
=== The Aesthetic Materials and the Purpose of Drama ===
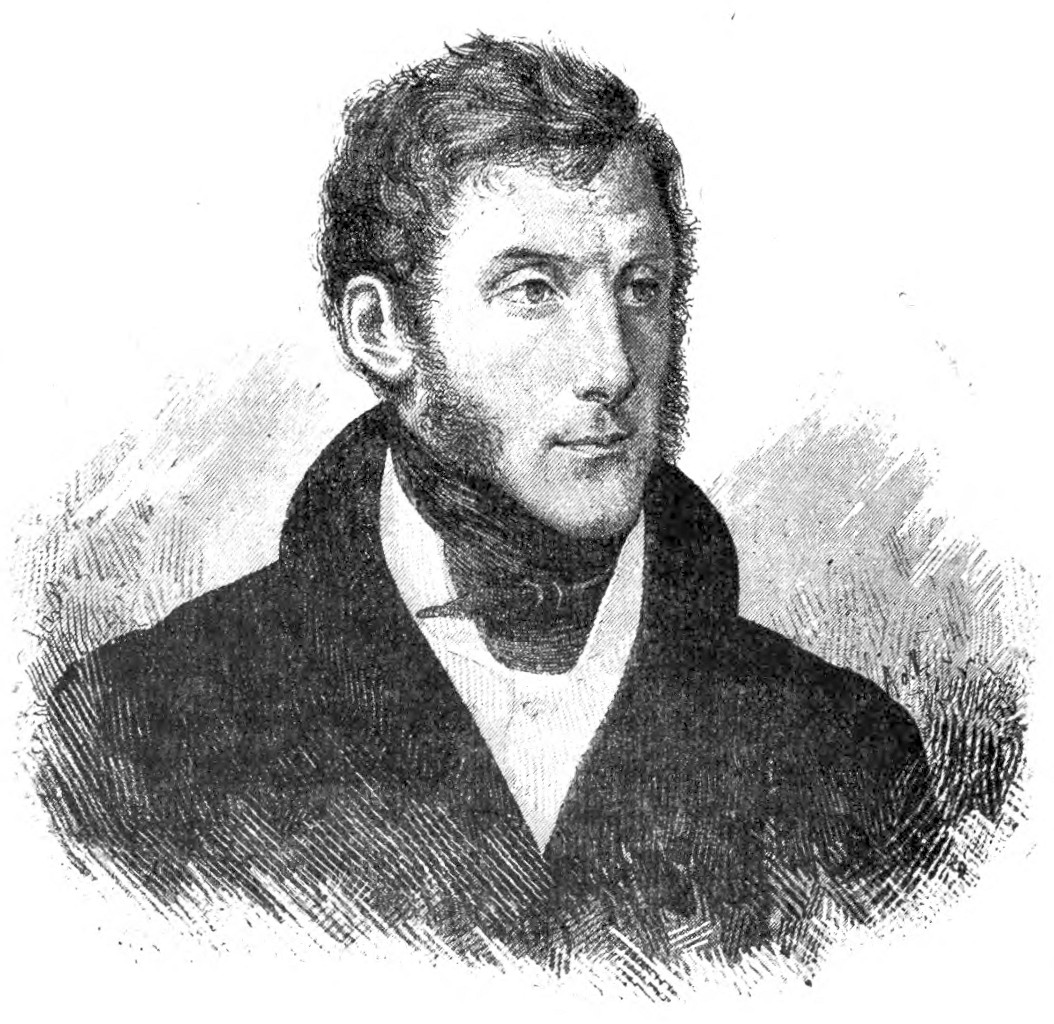
Alessandro Manzoni in 1829, watercolor portrait reproduced in Cantù

The Aesthetic Materials are among the most important and significant documents revealing Manzoni's conception of drama, a kind of notebook in which the poet jotted down his reflections and which in part, together with the Preface to Carmagnola, flowed into the much more famous Letter to Monsieur Chauvet. The stage, according to Manzoni, should not convey passions and strong emotions, in the exasperation of the protagonist's ego, but induce the spectator to meditate on the scenes he witnesses. More specifically, the play must portray "the restlessness connatural to man as long as he remains on this earth where he cannot reach his final end." Manzoni thus disagrees with Nicole and Bossuet's view that plays were immoral. He condemns the Racinian tragédie classique, but praises the work of Goethe and Schiller, and especially that of the "admirable Shakespeare," whose "intellect [...] has been able so much to traverse the ambages of the human heart, so beauties of this sphere become common in your works." The "emotional identification" of Racine and the French theater must be replaced by "thoughtful emotion," as Gino Tellini put it.

Contrary to the tragédie classique, the spectator, in Manzoni, is "outside the action," in the words of the famous Preface to Carmagnola, in which concepts from the Materials and the unfinished essay Della moralità delle opere tragiche (1816-1817) converged. The story and the play must convey a Christian message without, however, presenting an idyllic reality: on the contrary, Manzoni goes in search of characters, who, like Francesco Bussone (the Count of Carmagnola), oppose the evil that dominates human society, even at the cost of their lives. The important thing is that the playwright seeks truth and stays true to historical reality. Truth and poetry coincide, as explained in the postils to the Schlegelian Cours de littérature dramatique and in Aesthetic Materials. "There is no doubt," he writes in the postils, "that the eternally true things are the most praised." And that, as he states in the Materials, "the deeper one goes to discover the truth in the heart of man, the more true poetry is found." Truth, historical and spiritual, the investigation of the human heart constitute the most authentic poetry, the "poetic beauty."

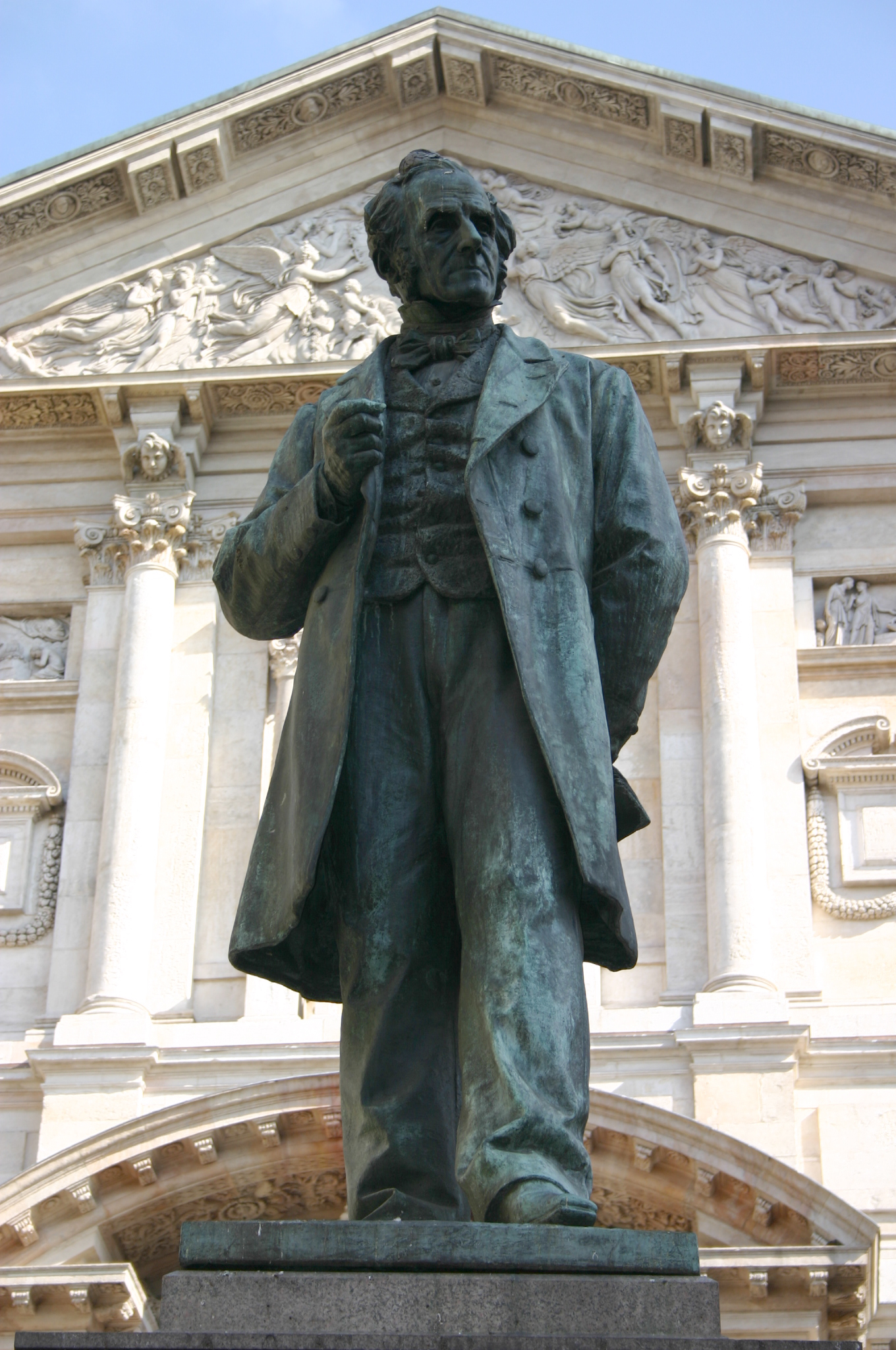
Monument to Alessandro Manzoni, in Piazza San Fedele, Milan. Erected in 1883, the monument, the work of Francesco Barzaghi, was placed in front of the church where the writer suffered a head injury that led to his death within a few months.

== Beyond Romanticism ==
=== Manzonian realism and the rejection of the idyll ===
Although he adhered to the Romantic theme, Manzoni did not borrow for his novel the fantastic vision typical of the transalpine and British Romantic movements. (Note: See the focus on the True and the rejection of mythology set forth in the Letter on Romanticism to Cesare d'Azeglio.) His objective analysis of reality, in which the sublimity of Lecco's landscapes alternates with the bleakness of the plague and violence in general, seeks to frame the story against a real background. The narrative realism and the renunciation of the fairy-tale dimension, however, emerge at the end of the novel, when there is no happy ending, but a resumption of daily life broken by the misadventures of the protagonists: Renzo and Lucia's departure from Lecco and the resumption of daily activities are the result of the author's choice to:

conclude his story in the illusory recovery of original paradises typical of traditional romance schemes and those of a genre widespread in European literature in the late eighteenth and early nineteenth centuries, the idyll. Manzoni's writing denies any idyllic interpretation; it is not meant to be a search for serene happiness in the tranquil setting of a fresh nature, but an ongoing verification of the contradictions always at play in man's individual and historical existence.

— Ferroni, p. 58)

=== Beyond the novel: historical nonfiction ===
In the "silent years," that is, from the end of the Quindicennio creativo (1827) until his death in 1873, Manzoni moved away from the literary positions that drove him to the creation of The Betrothed, a mixture of the poetic truth and the historical truth. Already between 1828 and 1831, Manzoni wrote Del romanzo storico e, in genere, de' componimenti misti di storia e di invenzione (later published in 1850 along with the dialogue Dell'Invenzione) in which he asserted that the absolute truth of historical objectivity could only lie within the field of historiography. The addition, as an appendix to the 1840 edition, of the History of the Infamous Column is an indication of this poetic shift, which would later find full expression in the late and unfinished The French Revolution of 1789 and the Italian Revolution of 1859. Comparative observations.

== Questione della lingua ==
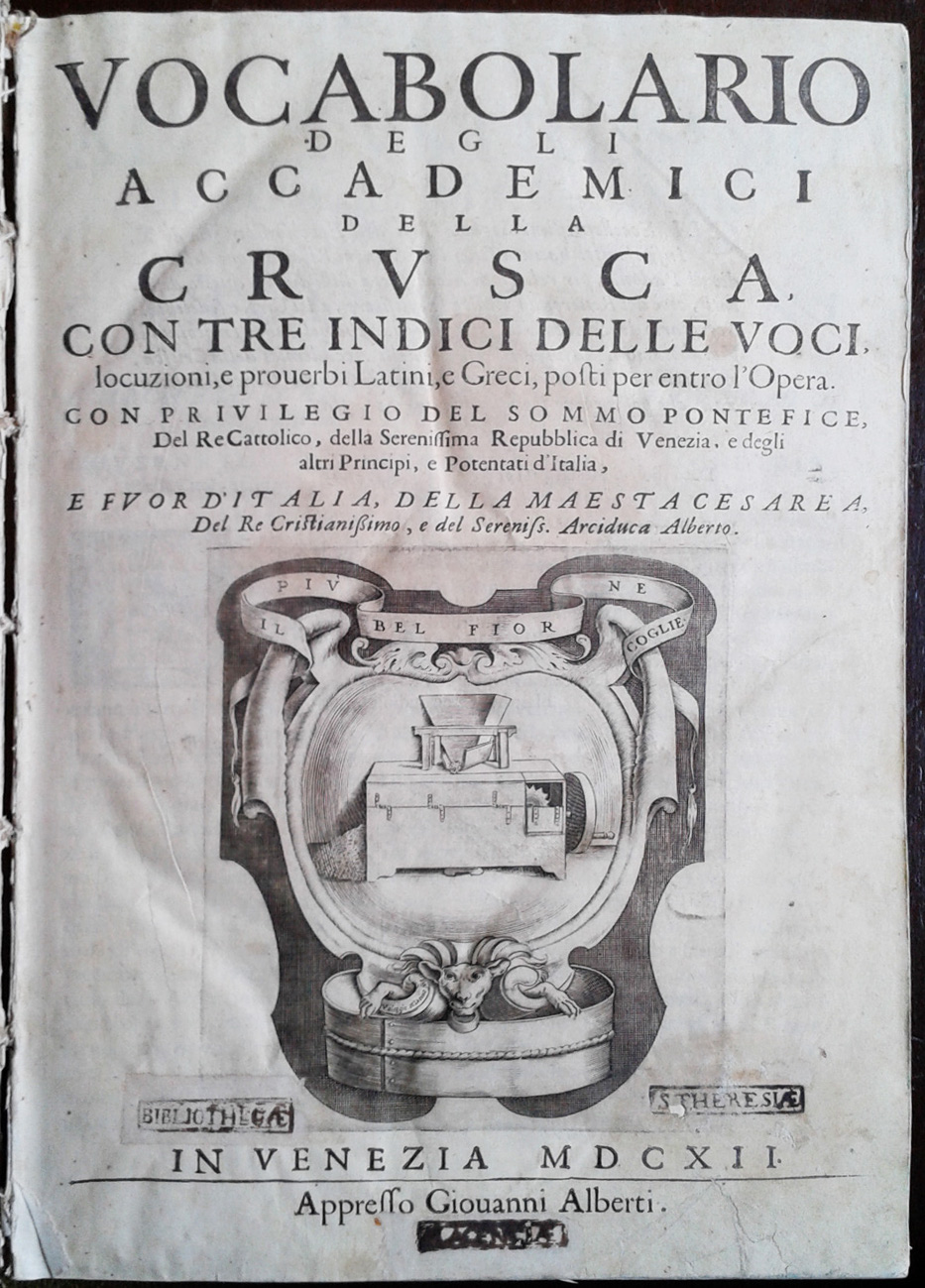
Title page of the Vocabolario della Crusca of 1612, edited by the academy of the same name. Manzoni used, in the preparatory stage of the novel, the only dictionary (which then during the 17th and 18th centuries had several editions) that could help him in the use of the good language.

=== Background: from Dante to the Accademia della Crusca ===
Fundamental to Manzoni's poetic reflections was the search for a common language, or koinè, that could be a vehicle of communication among the inhabitants of the peninsula, since they spoke a variety of local languages and dialects, of Romance and non-Romance origin. The attempt to find a particular vernacular that could fulfill such a "standard" function was initially sought by Dante Alighieri with his De Vulgari Eloquentia, but the real debate arose in the 1500s, when Pietro Bembo, Baldassarre Castiglione, Niccolò Machiavelli and Gian Giorgio Trissino proposed linguistic models chosen on conflicting ideological grounds: from Bembo's proposed imitatio of Francesco Petrarch and Giovanni Boccaccio to Castiglione's good courtly language, and finally to Machiavelli's defense of sixteenth-century Florentine and Trissino's "anti-Classicist" choice. The attempted institutionalization of the Bembo model by Leonardo Salviati of the Accademia della Crusca, and the publication of the first dictionary in 1612, imposed a linguistic "guide" that, however, remained included within the narrow circle of the learned. (Note: See, for further discussion, the book by Marazzini.)

=== Manzonian linguistic evolution ===
==== The letter of November 3, 1821 and "the good language" ====
Manzoni, prompted by Romanticism and its need to establish a dialogue with a wide heterogeneous audience, set himself the goal of finding a language in which there was a lexicon filled with terms related to everyday use and specific areas of knowledge, and where there was no great disparity between spoken and written language. The question of language emerges fully in the letter of November 3, 1821 addressed to Fauriel, where Manzoni compares the French language, united and so rich in expressions concerning concreteness, and a vague, literary, supranational Italian but not corresponding to the need for truth and communication to which Manzoni instead aimed:

When a Frenchman tries to express, as best he can, his ideas, just look at how much abundance and variety of words he finds in that language of his [...] Imagine, on the other hand, an Italian, non-Tuscan, writing in a language which he has hardly ever spoken, and who (even if he was born in the privileged town) writes in a language spoken by a small number of inhabitants of Italy [. ...] this poor writer [Manzoni addresses himself] entirely lacks the feeling, so to speak, of communion with his reader, the certainty of handling an instrument equally known to both [...] For, in that case, what does the word Italian mean? According to some, what is recorded in the Crusca, according to others what is understood throughout Italy or by the educated classes...

— Manzoni, Lettere, pp. 169–170)

Manzoni, "heir" to a dispute that took place three centuries earlier and ended with the establishment of the Italian language into a literary language, wonders at this point "what an Italian should do, who, not knowing how to do anything else, wants to write." If one examines the literary writings from 1812 onward (i.e., from the first Sacred Hymns), Manzoni, while boycotting the neoclassical mentality in favor of the "democratic" principles set forth in the section on Romanticism, failed on the other hand to eliminate the residual linguistic expressions and rhetorical stylistic devices proper to Arcadian Petrarchism: the problem therefore had to be solved. Again in his letter to Fauriel, therefore, Manzoni decided to choose as the language of the novel what he described as "the good one," namely a mixture of classical Italian based on the Vocabolario della Crusca, Milanese and French (Note: In order to approach the courtly Tuscan of the Crusca (in the new edition edited by the Veronese priest Antonio Cesari in 1811), Manzoni used Cherubini's Milanese-Italian dictionary as a linguistic intermediary, partly to check whether certain expressions given in the Crusca were present in the Milanese dialect (Marazzini, p. 380)). As pointed out in the work of Dell'Aquila, p. 40), Manzoni also consulted the Dictionaire of the French Academy, the dictionary of medieval Latin edited by Du Cange. Therefore, as points out Marazzini, p. 381): "In short, Manzoni uses his familiar tools (dialect, French) to deepen his knowledge of Tuscan.") as a compromise in the face of the linguistic marasmus in which Italy was pondering: "thus, with a more painful and more obstinate work the least possible harm will be done here...".

=== From Fermo and Lucia to the "Quarantana" ===
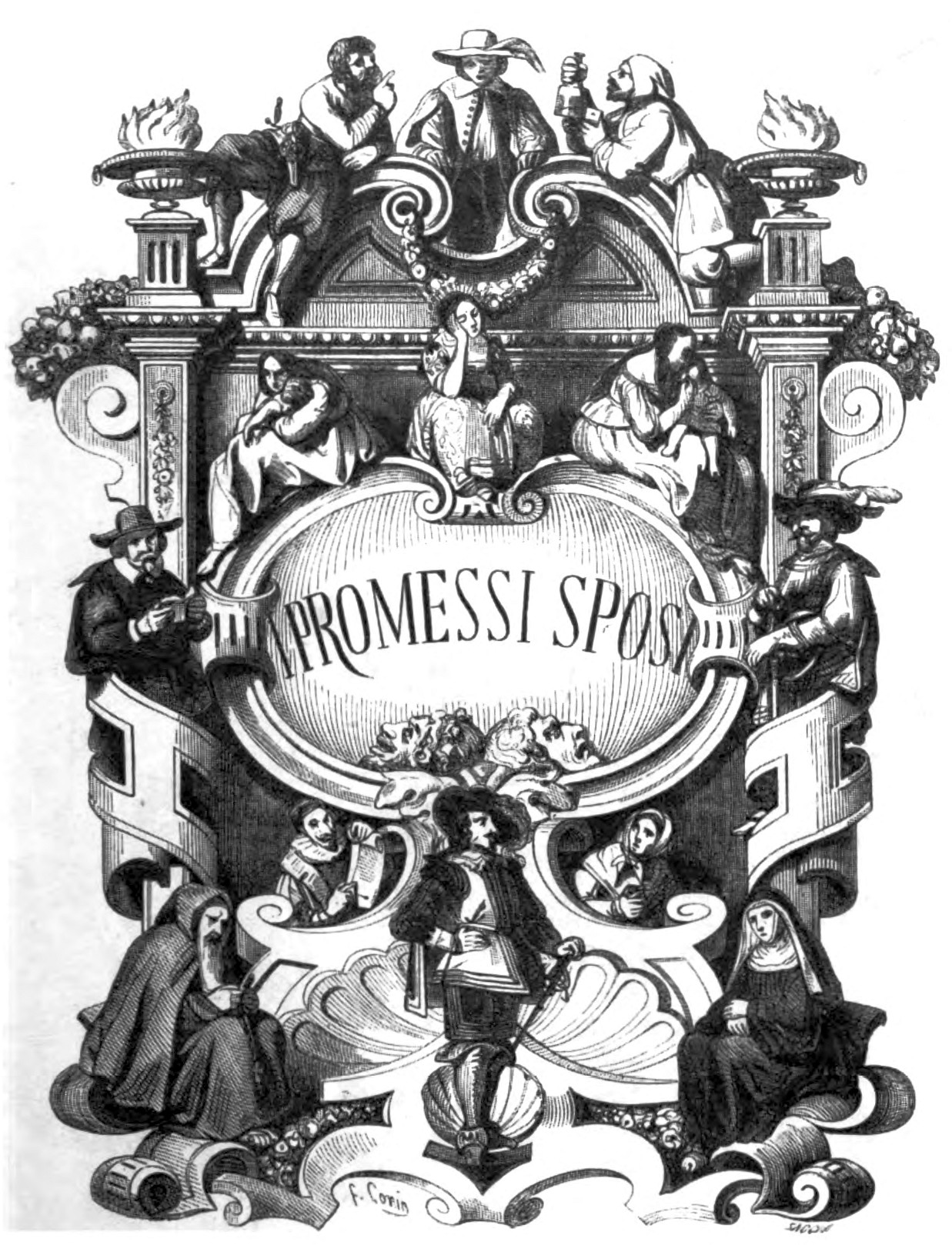
Illustrated frontispiece of the 1840 second edition of The Betrothed (the "Quarantana"), with illustrations by Francesco Gonin

The good language, which finds full expression in Fermo e Lucia, did not satisfy the author: already in the second introduction to the novel, Manzoni asked the reader's forgiveness for not having written well. Thus, in the aftermath of the publication of Fermo, which took place in 1825, Manzoni decided to consult again the dictionaries used for Fermo e Lucia, but looking mainly for the most popular forms. Then, when the "Ventisettana" came out in 1827, Manzoni realized, however, that it was no longer necessary to investigate books to discover the vitality of a language, but that it was necessary instead to listen to it. Therefore, in July 1827, Manzoni and his family left for Florence to listen "by ear" to living Tuscan expressions, where members of the Gabinetto Vieusseux eagerly awaited him and with whom he established contacts of friendship and collaboration in revision. The stay, which lasted until early October, was extremely productive for Manzoni, as he could directly listen to and ask the Florentines about the idioms of everyday life. As expounded in enthusiastic terms in his letter of September 17, 1827 addressed to Grossi, Manzoni noted all the similarities and dissimilarities between Milanese and living Tuscan, aided in this by Giovanni Battista Niccolini and Gaetano Cioni, concluding the missive with the famous rinsing of clothes in the Arno.

The path begun in Florence was concluded after years of linguistic studies (in these facilitated also by the presence of the Florentine housekeeper Emilia Luti), and in 1840 the final edition of I promessi sposi was edited on the model of the cultured Florentine, which presented even more than the Tuscan the unified dimension between the oral and literary dimensions that Manzoni so much sought. Between the 1827 and 1840 editions, all the Tuscan terms that were municipal and distant from the use of current Florentine were eliminated, in addition to the Lombard dialectal remnants and Frenchisms.

== See also ==
- Alessandro Manzoni

== Bibliography ==
- Bellini, Eraldo (2000). Elli, Enrico; Langella, Giuseppe (eds.). Calvino e i classici italiani (Calvino e Manzoni). Milan: Vita e Pensiero. pp. 489–534. ISBN 88-343-0400-4.
- Diego Maria Bertini (1994). "Revisione de 'La lingua di Manzoni. Avviamento alle prose manzoniane'". Aevum. 68 (3). Vita e Pensiero: 812–818. JSTOR 20860448.
- XII Congresso nazionale di Studi Manzoniani: verso il bicentenario del Manzoni. Milano - Lecco - Barzio, 22-25 settembre 1983. Milano: Casa del Manzoni-Centro Nazionale Studi Manzoniani. 1984. Essays by:
  - Carlo Bo. Manzoni: la parola come coscienza. pp. 21–30.
- Aurelia Accame Bobbio (1960). La crisi manzoniana del 1817. Firenze: Le Monnier.
- Alberto Cadioli (1995). Romanticismo italiano. Vol. 6. Milano: Editrice Bibliografica.
- Lanfranco Caretti. Manzoni: ideologia e stile (4 ed.). Torino: Einaudi.
- Giovanni Cereti; Daniele Menozzi; Roberto Morozzo della Rocca e Paolo Ricca (2009). Giovanni Filoramo e Daniele Menozzi (ed.). L'età contemporanea. Vol. 4 (3 ed.). Roma-Bari: Laterza.
- Faustino De Gregorio (2006) [2001]. Per una storia dei rapporti tra Stato e Chiesa: considerazioni generali sul Cattolicesimo liberale dell'Ottocento. Profili storico-giuridici (2 ed.). Roma: Aracne.
- Michele Dell'Aquila (January 1987). "Manzoni e i Vocabolari". Italianistica: Rivista di letteratura italiana. 16 (1). Accademia Editoriale: 39–49. ISSN 0391-3368. JSTOR 23928246.
- De Luca, Giuseppe (1974). Picchi, Mario (ed.). Intorno al Manzoni. Rome: Edizioni di Storia e Letteratura.
- Eurialo De Michelis (1962). Studi sul Manzoni. Milano: Feltrinelli.
- Ferroni, Giulio (2006). Ferroni, Giulio; Cortellessa, Andrea; Pantani, Italo; Tatti, Silvia (eds.). Il Romanticismo e Manzoni: Restaurazione e Risorgimento (1815-1861). Vol. 10. Milan: Mondadori.
- Fiorenzo Forti (1 January 1973). "Manzoni e il rifiuto dell'idillio". Giornale Storico della Letteratura Italiana. 150 (472): 481–514. ISSN 0017-0496.
- Cesare Federico Goffis (1 July 1956). "L'Urania e la crisi poetica del Manzoni". Lettere Italiane. 10 (3): 349–363. ISSN 0024-1334.
- Jemolo, Arturo Carlo (1973). Il dramma di Manzoni (2 ed.). Florence: Le Monnier.
- Langella, Giuseppe (2000). Elli, Enrico; Langella, Giuseppe (eds.). Il mistero della Salvezza. Sul primo abbozzo della "Pentecoste". Milan: Vita e Pensiero. pp. 141–184. ISBN 88-343-0400-4.
- Giuseppe Locorotondo (1972). BREME, Ludovico Pietro Arborio Gattinara dei conti di Sartirana dei marchesi di. Vol. 14. Roma: Istituto dell'Enciclopedia italiana.
- Romano Luperini (4 April 2013). "Il tiranno, l'innominato e la modernità di Manzoni". La Letteratura e Noi. Archived from the original on 14 September 2015.
- Giovanni Macchia (1994). Manzoni e la via del romanzo. Milano: Adelphi.
- Alessandro Manzoni (1881). Angelo de Gubernatis (ed.). Lettere. Milano: Libreria di educazione e di istruzione Paolo Carrara.
- Alessandro Manzoni (1882). Giovanni Sforza (ed.). Epistolario di Alessandro Manzoni. Vol. 1. Milano: Libreria di educazione e di istruzione Paolo Carrara.
- Manzoni, Alessandro (1887). Bonghi, Ruggero (ed.). Opere inedite o rare. Vol. 3. Milan: Rechiedei.
- Alessandro Manzoni (1981). Adelaide Sozzi Casanova (ed.). Scritti di teoria letteraria. Milano: Biblioteca universale Rizzoli.
- Alessandro Manzoni (1985). Giovanni Giuseppe Amoretti (ed.). Lettere sui Promessi Sposi. Milano: Garzanti.
- Claudio Marazzini (2002) [1994]. La lingua italiana. Profilo storico (3 ed.). Bologna: Il Mulino. ISBN 978-88-15-08675-4.
- Claudio Marazzini (2011). Raffaele Simone (ed.). Questione della lingua. Roma: Istituto dell'Enciclopedia Italiana.
- Millefiorini, Pietro (2009). Provando e riprovando: impegno, politica ed etica nella grande letteratura italiana. Milan: Jaca book. ISBN 978-88-16-40874-6.
- Ernst Nef (January 1970). "Caso e Provvidenza nei Promessi Sposi". MLN. 85 (1). The Johns Hopkins University Press: 13–23.
- Luciano Parisi (January 1999). "Il tema della Provvidenza in Manzoni". MLN. 114 (1). The Johns Hopkins University Press: 83–105. JSTOR 3251294.
- Luciano Parisi (January 2003). "Manzoni, il Seicento francese e il giansenismo". Italian Issue. 118 (1): 85–115.
- Alessandro Passerin d'Entrèves (1955). Il "nostro" Manzoni. Torino: Einaudi. pp. 209 e sgg.
- Carlo Porta (1977). Gennaro Barbarisi e Guido Bezzola (ed.). Poesie (2 ed.). Milano: Garzanti.
- Ezio Raimondi (1 October 1967). "Alessandro Manzoni e il Romanticismo". Lettere Italiane. 19 (4): 441–456. ISSN 0024-1334.
- Raimondi, Ezio (1974). Il romanzo senza idillio: saggio sui Promessi sposi (in Italian). G. Einaudi. ISBN 978-88-06-40246-4.
- Francesco Sberlati (2007). "Longobardi e lessicografi: filologia e storia in Manzoni". Italianistica: Rivista di letteratura italiana. 36 (1/2): 35–57. ISSN 0391-3368. JSTOR 23937736.
- Tellini, Gino (2007). Manzoni. Rome: Salerno. ISBN 978-88-8402-572-2.
- Tonelli, Luigi (1984) [1928]. Manzoni. Milan: Dall'Oglio.
- Alessandro Tortoreto (1 May 1971). "Manzoni e Leopardi". Aevum. 45 (3): 322–336.
- Gaetano Trombatore (1 April 1957). "L'esordio del Manzoni". Giornale Storico della Letteratura Italiana. 134 (406): 249–297. ISSN 0017-0496.
- Gaetano Trombatore (1 January 1961). "I sonetti e le odi giovanili di Alessandro Manzoni e l'idillio "Adda"". Giornale Storico della Letteratura Italiana. 138 (422): 196–231.
