= Comparatist =

Comparatist or comparativist may refer to:

- A student or a scholar in the field of comparative literature or comparative law
- The Comparatist, an American comparative-literature journal
