= Il cinque maggio =

1821 ode by Alessandro Manzoni

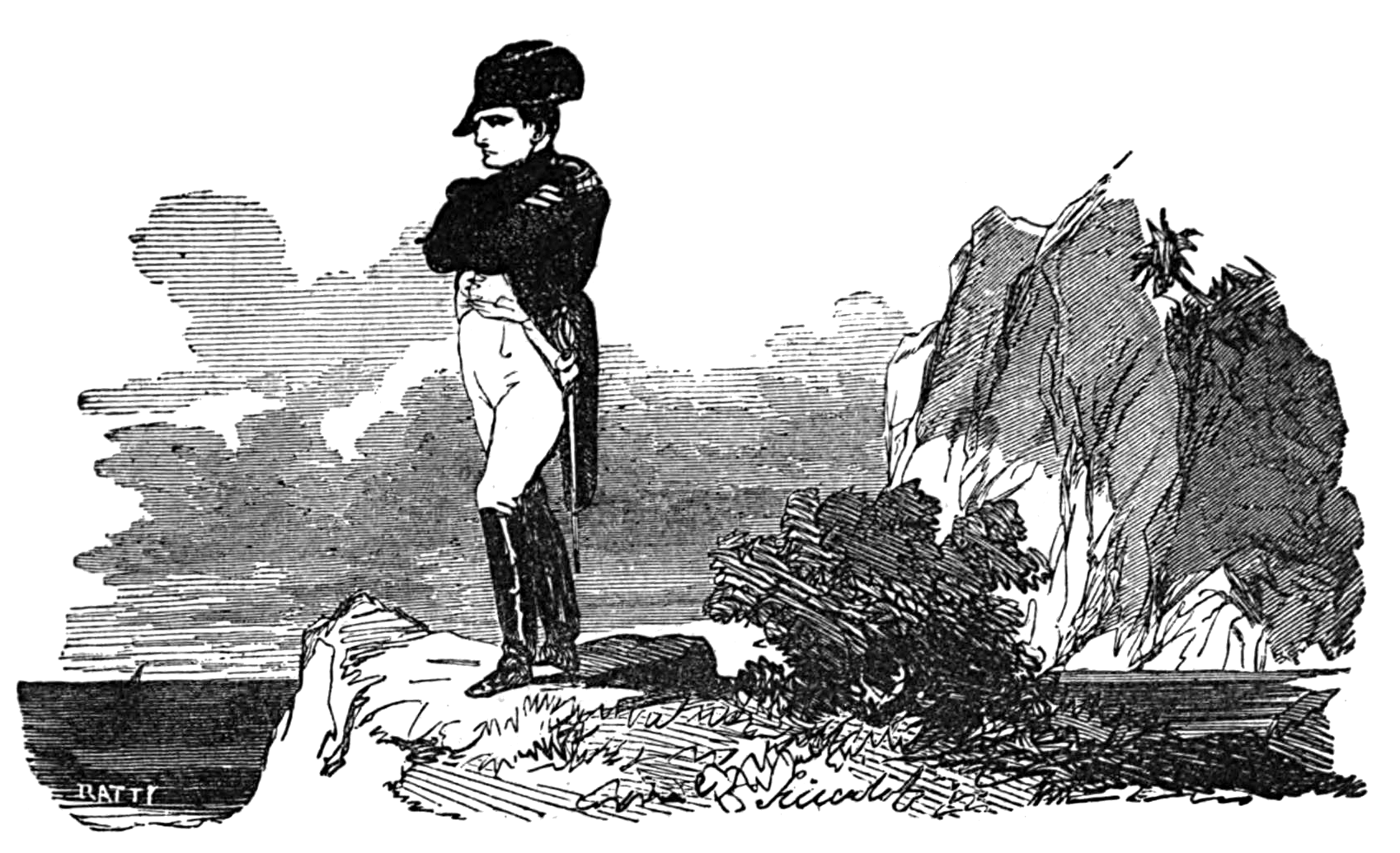
Napoleon on Saint Helena, illustration from an 1881 edition of Manzoni’s works.

Il cinque maggio is an 1821 ode by the Italian poet Alessandro Manzoni, written after the news of Napoleon’s death on 5 May 1821. It opens with the famous line «Ei fu.» (“He is gone.”) and reflects on Napoleon’s rise and fall, the limits of worldly glory, and Providence.

== Background ==
Manzoni read the Gazzetta di Milano of 16 July 1821 at his villa near Milan and, struck by the report of Napoleon’s death, drafted the poem quickly over three days in mid-July. A first autograph draft dated “18 Luglio [1821]” and a clean copy from late July survive in the Biblioteca Nazionale Braidense.

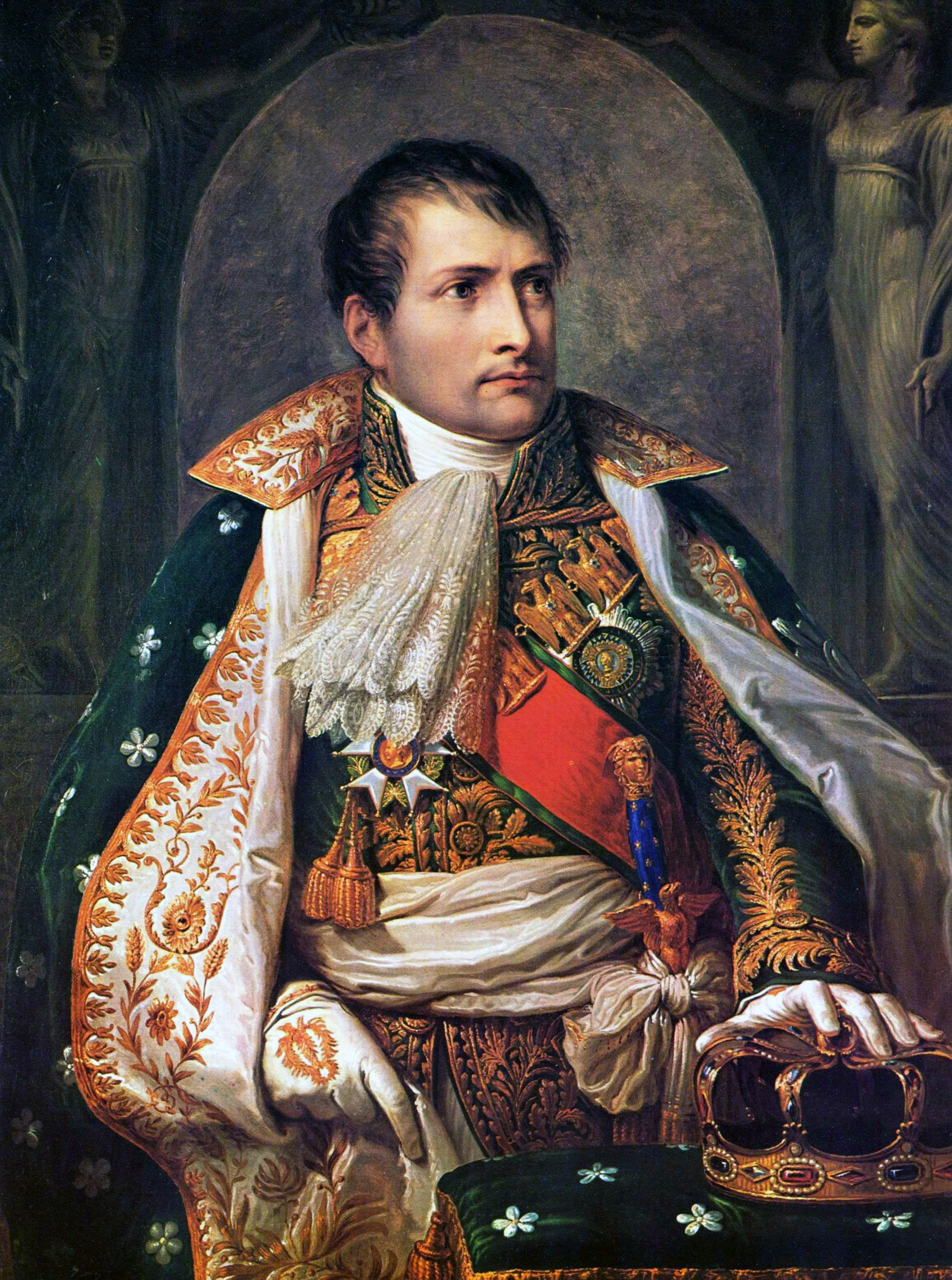
Napoleon by Andrea Appiani (1805).

== Form and themes ==
The ode has 18 six-line stanzas in seven-syllable lines (settenari); the usual rhyme is ABCBDE. The poem moves from the shocked announcement of death («Ei fu.») to a brief survey of triumphs and defeats and ends with a Christian meditation on the vanity of fame and the possibility of grace.

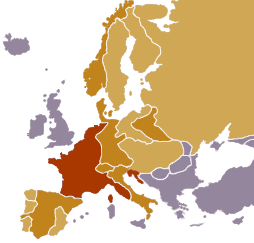
Napoleon’s empire at its height (1811).

== Publication and reception ==
Austrian censorship blocked publication in Milan. The ode circulated in manuscript and was first printed outside Austrian control, then appeared in Italy in 1823 with the Turin publisher Marietti. The poem was soon known across Europe; Johann Wolfgang von Goethe translated it into German and published ‘‘Der fünfte Mai’’ in Über Kunst und Alterthum (1823).
