= Francesco Lomonaco =

Italian writer

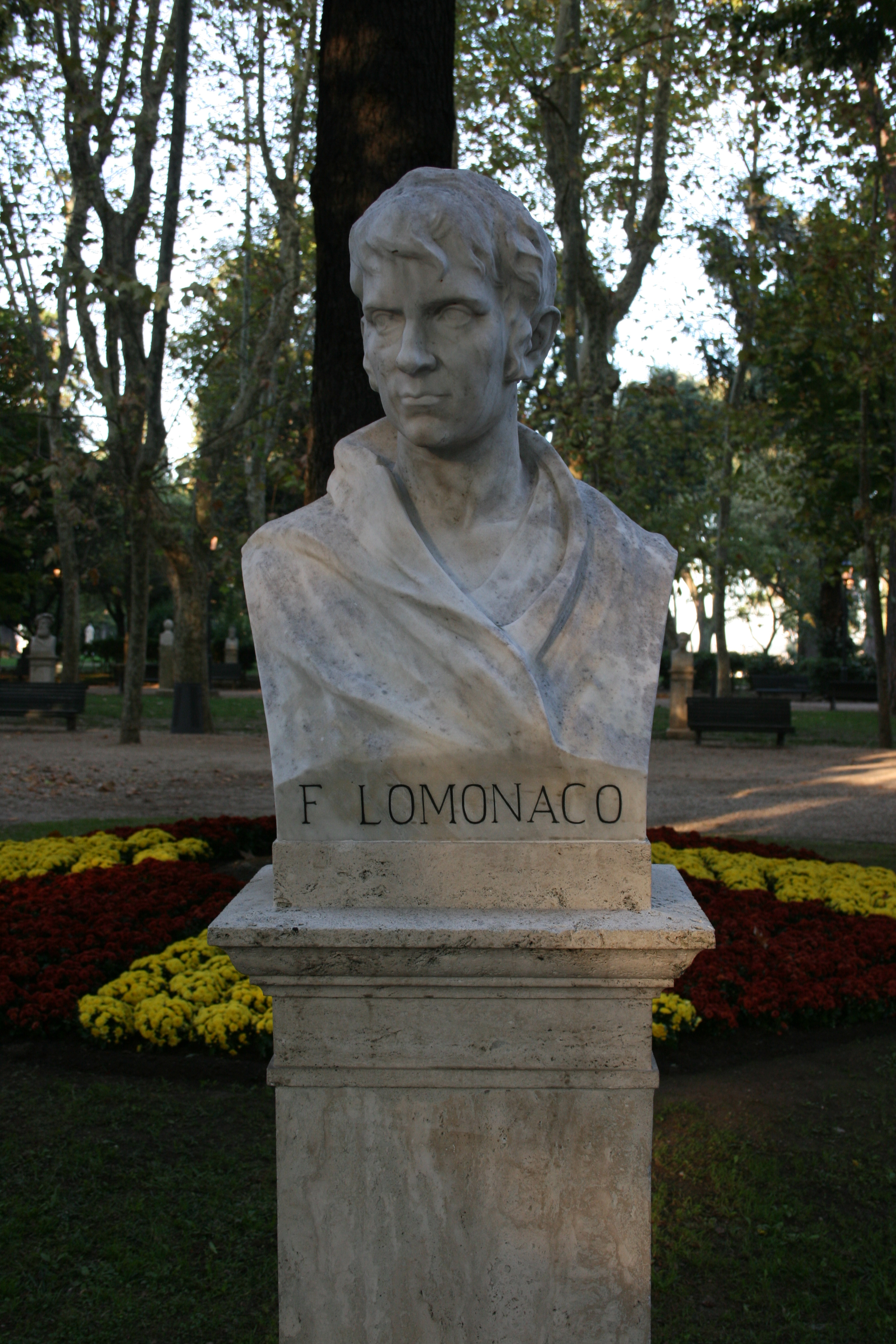
- Bust of Francesco Lomonaco
- Born: 22 November 1772; Montalbano Jonico, Basilicata, Italy
- Died: 1 September 1810 (aged 37); Pavia, Lombardy, Italy
- Education: University of Naples Federico II
- Occupations: Writer; Political Activist
- Writing career
- Period: Age of Enlightenment
- Genre: Essay

Francesco Lomonaco (22 November 1772 – 1 September 1810) was an Italian writer and revolutionary. Known as the "Italian Plutarch", he was a precursor to and a main proponent of the Italian unification.

== Biography ==
Born in Montalbano Jonico, a small village in the province of Matera, Francesco Lomonaco studied law at the University of Naples. When the Neapolitan revolution broke out in January 1799, Lomonaco strongly supported the new Republican government installed by the French. Following the reinstatement of the monarchy in June 1799, he took refuge in France.

In Paris he published the Rapporto al cittadino Carnot (1800), in which he outlined the major reasons for the failure of the Neapolitan Revolution. After the battle of Marengo, Lomonaco moved to Milan, where he befriended Ugo Foscolo and the young Alessandro Manzoni. His biographies of Italian military leaders led to a chair at the Scuola Militare in Pavia in 1805. He drowned himself when his Discorsi letterari e filosofici (1809) were confiscated by the French authorities as overly democratic.

== Selected works ==
- Gabriel Bonnot de Mably (1799). De' diritti e doveri del cittadino. Translated by Francesco Lomonaco. Naples: Stamperia Patriotica.
- Rapporto fatto da Francesco Lomonaco patriota napoletano al cittadino Carnot. Paris. 1800.
- Analisi della sensibilità e delle sue leggi e delle sue diverse modificazioni considerate relativamente alla morale ed alla politica. Milan. 1801.
- Vite degli eccellenti italiani. 3 vols. Lugano. 1802–1803.
- Vite dei famosi capitani d'Italia. Milan: nella Stamperia Nuova. 1804–1805.
- Discorsi letterari e filosofici. Milan. 1809.
