= Forum Italicum =

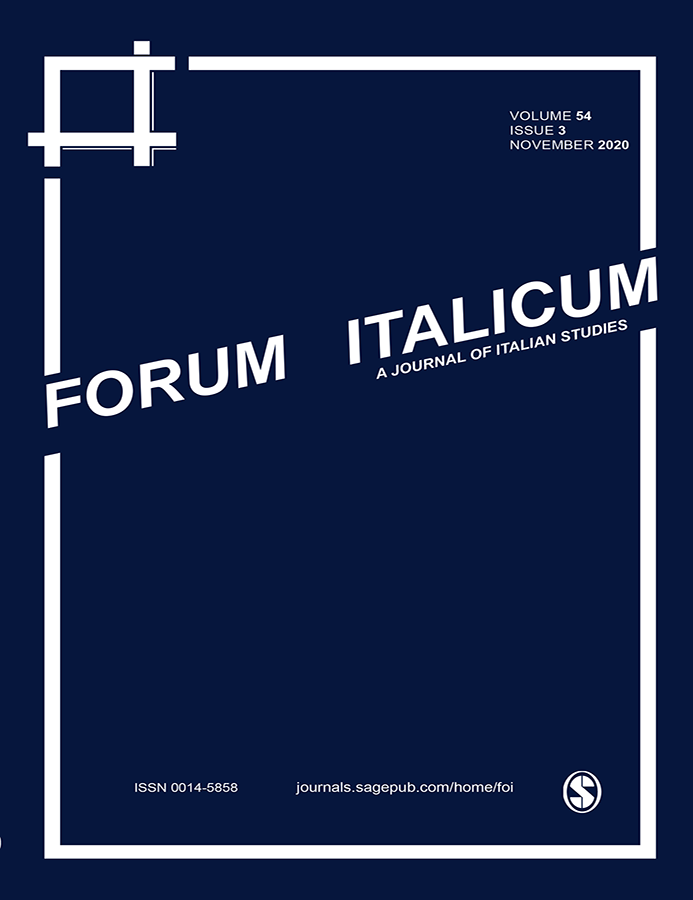
- Discipline: Cultural Studies
- Language: English
- Edited by: Giuseppe Gazzola

Publication details
- History: 1967 -present
- Publisher: SAGE Publications
- Frequency: Triannual

Standard abbreviations
- ISO 4: Forum Ital.

Indexing
- ISSN: 0014-5858 (print); 2168-989X (web)
- LCCN: 86648580
- OCLC no.: 1568702

Links
- Journal homepage; Online access; Online archive

Forum Italicum, subtitled as, 'A Journal of Italian Studies', is a peer-reviewed academic journal that publishes papers twice a year in the field of Cultural Studies and Italian Studies. The journal's Editor is Giuseppe Gazzola (Stony Brook University, New York). It has been in publication since 1967 and is currently published by SAGE Publications in association with The Center for Italian Studies at Stony Brook University, New York.

== Scope ==
Forum Italicum is a journal of Italian Studies, intended as a place where scholars, critics, and teachers can present their views on the literature, language, and culture of Italy and other countries in relation to Italy.

== Abstracting and indexing ==
Forum Italicum is abstracted and indexed in the following databases:

- Scopus
- Arts and Humanities Citation Index (Thomson Reuters)
- MLA International Bibliography (Modern Language Association)
