= The Comparatist =

- Discipline: Comparative literature
- Language: English
- Edited by: Zahi Zalloua

Publication details
- History: 1977-present
- Publisher: University of North Carolina Press (United States)
- Frequency: Annual

Standard abbreviations
- ISO 4: Comparatist

Indexing
- ISSN: 0195-7678 (print); 1559-0887 (web)

Links
- Journal homepage; The Comparatist at Project Muse; The Comparatist information from SCLA

The Comparatist is an American literary journal published annually since 1977 by the Society for Comparative Literature and the Arts that publishes articles on the topic of comparative literature. Its current editor-in-chief is Zahi Zalloua (Whitman College).

The journal focuses on the following topics:

- Comparative study of literary and cultural movements
- Connections between European and other literatures
- Comparative studies of characteristics of literatures from Afro-Caribbean countries, the third world, and Eastern Europe

Standard articles in the journal include critical essays that address the position and function of comparative literature as a field of study, critical essays on writers and works of literature, and comparative readings of works of literature. The journal also publishes review essays, book reviews, and book notes. It is published by the University of North Carolina Press and since 2005 accessible via Project MUSE. The journal is indexed by the Modern Language Association Directory of Periodicals, the American Humanities Index, and others.
