= Nunziatella Military School =

Military educational institution in Naples, Italy

Coordinates: 40.8326°N 14.2444°E

Nunziatella Military Academy
- Reale Accademia Militare
- Motto: Preparo Alla Vita Ed Alle Armi
- Type: Military academy / military preparatory school
- Established: November 18, 1787; 238 years ago
- Students: Future officer corps
- Location: Naples, Italy
- Campus: "Rosso Maniero", e.g. "Red Manor" on Chiatamone cliff facing Chiaia, Mergellina and Posillipo.

The Nunziatella Military School of Naples, Italy, founded November 18, 1787 under the name of Royal Military Academy (it.: Reale Accademia Militare), is the oldest Italian institution of military education among those still operating. Its building, familiarly called "Red Manor" (it.: Rosso Maniero), and the adjacent church of the Santissima Annunziata, is an architectural monument of the city of Naples.

Located in Pizzofalcone in via Generale Parisi, 16, it has been a place of high military and civilian training since its foundation, and had among its teachers and students the likes of Francesco de Sanctis, Mariano d'Ayala, Carlo Pisacane, Guglielmo Pepe, Enrico Cosenz and even a king of Italy, Vittorio Emanuele III, and a Viceroy of Italian East Africa, Prince Amedeo, Duke of Aosta.

Among the many alumni of prestige, high degrees of the Armed Forces, including one Director of the European Union Military Committee, two Chiefs of Defence Staff, five Army Chiefs of Staff, two Navy Chiefs of Staff, one Air Chief of Staff, three Commanders General of the Guardia di Finanza (and three Vicecommanders), three Commanders General of the Carabinieri (and eighteen Vicecommanders) and two Directors-General of the Information Services need to be cited. As for the civilian alumni, three Prime Ministers, 14 Ministers, 13 senators and 11 deputies of the Kingdom of the Two Sicilies, the Kingdom of Italy and the Italian Republic, a President of the Constitutional Court, a five-time candidate for the Nobel Prize for Physics, as well as representatives of absolute importance of the cultural, political and professional Italian and international landscape, including a winner of the prestigious Sonning Prize, awarded to the most important European intellectuals, have to be remembered.

The flag of the school is decorated with a Gold Cross of Merit of the Carabinieri, and a bronze medal for the Valor of the Army. Its former students have earned 38 gold medals, 147 silver medals and 220 bronze medals for military valor; 2 gold medals for civil valor; and numerous other awards for valor. A total of 21 of them are decorated with the Military Order of Italy and 56 of the Order of Merit of the Italian Republic.

For its role in the last three centuries "in the field of higher education, as an academic, social and economic motor for Italy and all the Mediterranean countries linked to it", on February 22, 2012, it was declared "Historical and cultural heritage of the Mediterranean countries" by the Parliamentary Assembly of the Mediterranean. The School is also the winner of the Cypraea Prize for Science (1994) and the Mediterranean Award awarded by the Fondazione Mediterraneo (2012).

The way as youth is here educated has no equal in the whole of Europe. Philosophy, patriotism, and experience would not have been able to conceive or carry more noble institution to form the temperament, reason, heart and all the knowledge required to military.

— Giuseppe Maria Galanti

== History ==
=== The originating military institutes ===
The origins of the Nunziatella Military Academy should be traced back to the work of reorganization of the armed forces of the Kingdom of Naples, advocated by the statesman Bernardo Tanucci and implemented by Charles of Bourbon. Under his guidance was in fact identified for the first time the need to create ad hoc institutions for the training of officers of various specialties: this initiative was necessary to free the Kingdom of the Two Sicilies from subjection to the Kingdom of Spain, ruled by Philip V of Spain, father of Charles, and to limit the ambitions of his mother Elisabetta Farnese.

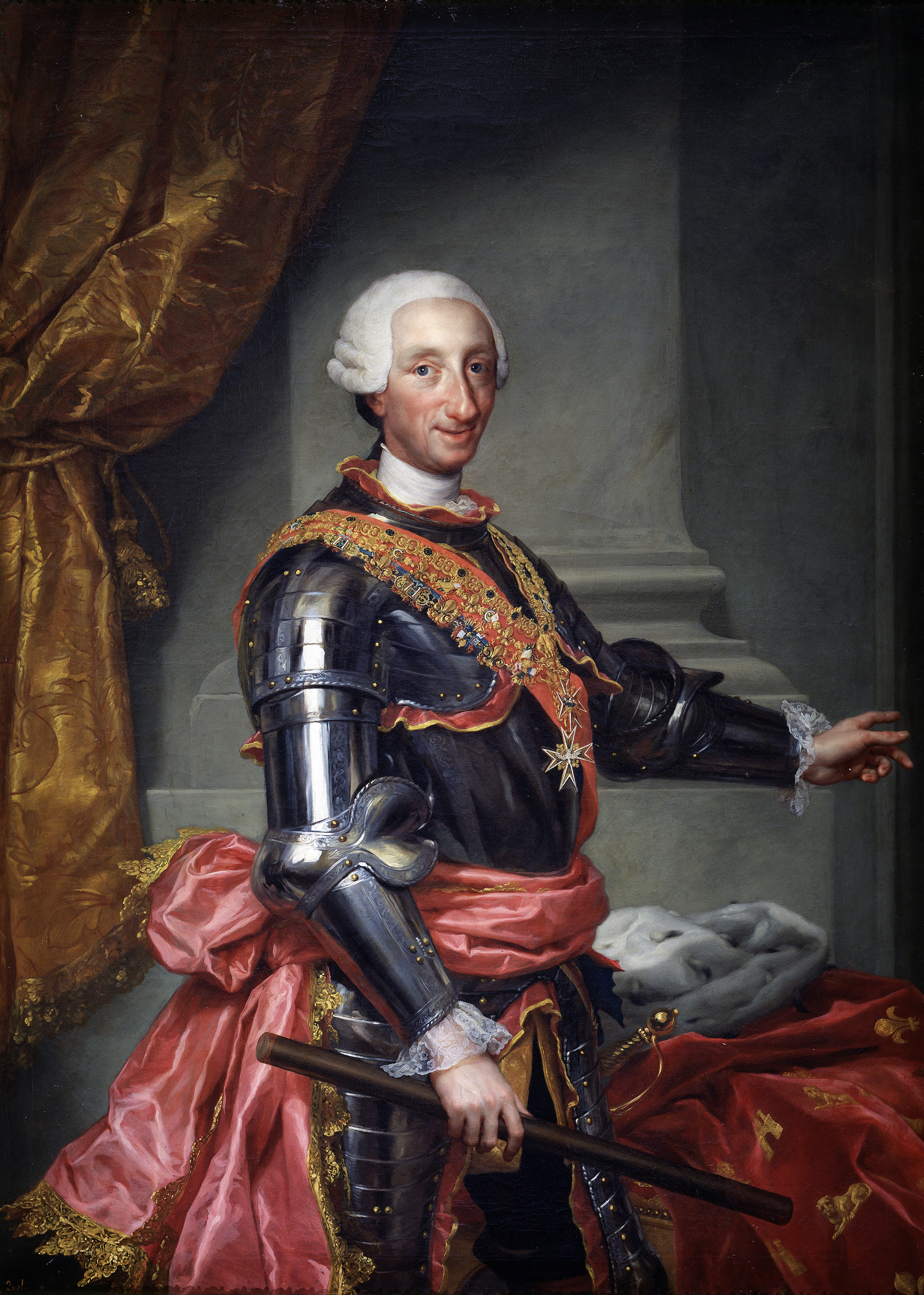
Charles of Bourbon, King of Naples

The initiative of Charles of Bourbon had its first result in the foundation of the Real Academia de los Guardias Estendartes de las Galeras (December 5, 1735), devoted to the training of naval officers: this institution, which has the primacy of the oldest Navy Academy in Italy, was initially housed in a building of the docks area in Naples, but then moved, after only two months, in the Palazzo Trotti, in the immediate vicinity of the royal palace of Naples and the Dominican Church of the Holy Spirit, in the area later occupied by the palace of the Prefecture. After a brief and not very profitable experience of a military school, located in the Maddalena town district, it was founded the Academy of Artillery (1745), for whose organization was called the mathematician Nicola Antonio De Martino, who was serving in Spain as Embassy secretary. The new Academy was installed in the Palace of Panatica, in Saint Lucia town district, and provided with a solid educational program, both theoretical and practical: there were, in fact, taught mathematics, physics, design and fencing, while the practical exercises were carried out at Molosiglio, in the docks area and at Fort Vigliena. The students were officers and cadets of the Academy of Artillery, for which attendance was mandatory; officers and cadets of other specialties, and noblemen who had passed an entrance examination were also admitted to the class. In accordance with the guidelines of the time, the programs of the Academy were specifically focused on math and science. The same Charles of Bourbon stated in the edict for the academy's founding that, "Albeit we have with any of our other royal orders and instructions provided specifically trained to make full use of our subjects sull'onorevole militia, although not of wherein in less expedient for the preservation of our states, the shine and the glory of our arms, the body of the militia remains Yea well disciplined and taught in mathematics, science which principally depend on the math and science of our rulers."

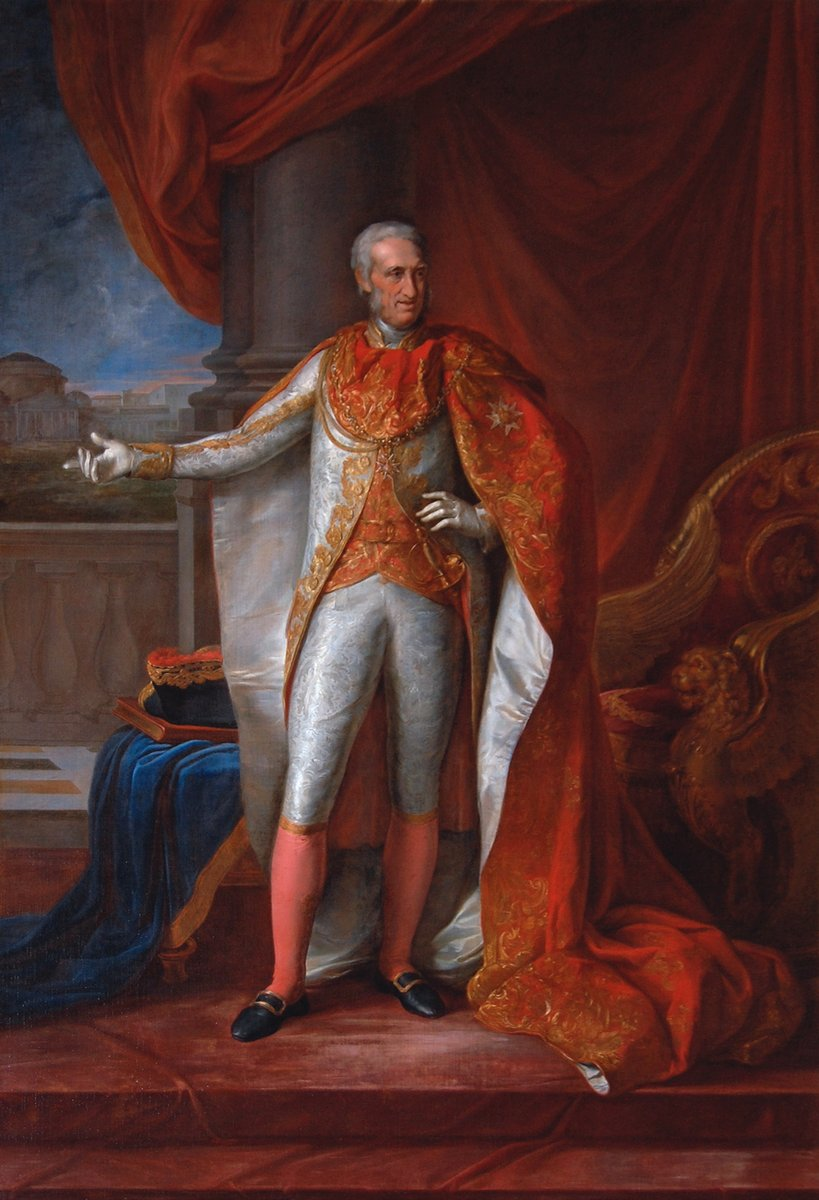
Ferdinand IV of Bourbon, King of Naples

The work of expansion of the educational foundation of the officers of the Army continued with the establishment of the Academy of the Corps of Military Engineers (1754), dedicated to the officers of Military Engineering. If on the one hand the foundation of the Academy added a new piece to the work to improve the preparation of military officers, on the other hand, made it clear the need for a single container that organically provided to this task . The departure of Charles for Spain, to ascend the throne of that kingdom after the death of Philip V, prevented him from continuing in his harmonizer plan, and therefore it became a responsibility of Tanucci to assist the young King Ferdinand IV of Bourbon in the progressive construction of a well-trained military ruling class.

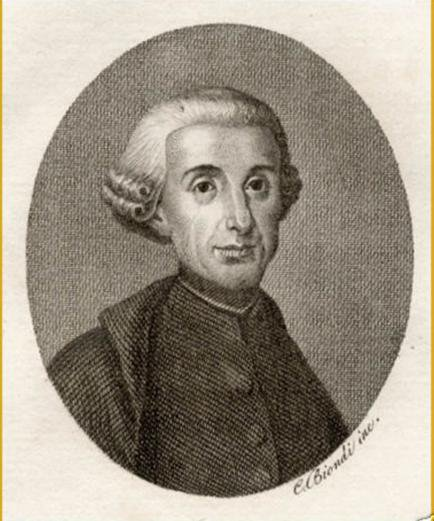
Vito Caravelli

To this end, in December 1769, it was issued a new ordinance, which ordered the merging of the Royal Academy of Artillery with that of the Corps of Engineers in the Royal Military Academy. The new institute (also based in the Palace of Panatica) opened its doors on 1 February 1770, after an inauguration ceremony marked by a speech by Captain Alonzo Nini. The organization of the institute, which had an initial budget of two thousand ducats a year, was similar to that of a university, as students went there only for classes and exams. Courses lasted four years, and attendance was mandatory for officers of artillery and engineering based in Naples. The battalions of infantry, cavalry and dragoons stationed in Naples had also to send two officers and two cadets each, while the regiments allocated elsewhere sent two cadets each. The general of brigade Luca Ricci was appointed commander, while the direction of the studies was entrusted to the famous experimental physicist and mathematician Vito Caravelli. The students sustained two exams a year and one at the end of the four-year course, at the presence of the Minister of War. The top four performers were promoted to the immediately higher rank in the units to which they belonged, the second four received a gold medal, the other ones a silver one. Although the scheme of studies was thick from the point of view of science, it was completely lacking in the humanities, and such deficiency began to be acutely felt in the educational environment, and would lead to the subsequent evolution of the Royal Military Academy.

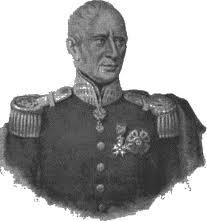
Francesco Pignatelli, Prince of Strongoli

Once it was provided to the training of the officers already in service, the work of reform turned to the cadets, i. e. the aspiring officers. To this end, and to establish a new unit that would serve "as a very keen tactical force in the most difficult war situations", a Corps of Cadets, called the Battaglione Real Ferdinando (King Ferdinando Battalion), was established in 1772. The battalion, housed in two former convents of the Croce and Trinità di Palazzo (in the area now occupied by the palace of the Prince of Salerno, in the Piazza del Plebiscito) was commanded by general Francesco Pignatelli, Prince of Strongoli, and Ferdinand IV of Bourbon himself wanted to acquire the rank of colonel. Students, sons of nobles and officers of rank higher than captain, were admitted at the age of eight, and continued their studies for six years, learning subjects like mathematics and military art. Once completed the entire course of studies with specialized institutes for the training of officers, from the rank of cadet to graduate school, it was considered appropriate to combine the different entities in a single entity. In September 1774, the Royal Academy was eliminated, and the students were merged into corps of the Battaglione Real Ferdinando. This new institution that was called the Reale Accademia del Battaglione Real Ferdinando (Royal Academy of the King Ferdinand Battalion), who from the original 270 cadets split into three companies, grew to 810, divided into nine companies. The students of the new Academy were distributed among the Palace of Panatica, where younger cadets were housed, and the aforementioned convents of the Croce and the Trinità di Palazzo, who housed all the others. Even the study programs were diversified in order to take account of differences in age and preparation, and for the first time the humanities were introduced for the younger cadets. The final exam was intended to verify that the aspirants to the rank of officer possessed "the extension of the theories of all the sciences that are necessary to know to comprehend the reason for what we do in the job for which you compete and theories of the same profession, the frankness of the intellectual faculties, which are well known for precise conduct cases in the data, and finally the degree of invention than is necessary to be able to find in the trade". The new institution quickly proved a valuable source of officers, prompting a growingly public appreciation by the king. However, in April 1755 the General Pignatelli was obliged to inform the king, with a wealth of evidence, the existence of a Masonic lodge among the students: this discovery was a source of deep conflict between Ferdinand IV and his wife Maria Carolina of Habsburg Alsace-Lorraine, which was notoriously protective of the Masonic movement in Naples. Consistent with the seriousness of the facts, serious measures were taken against those who were involved.

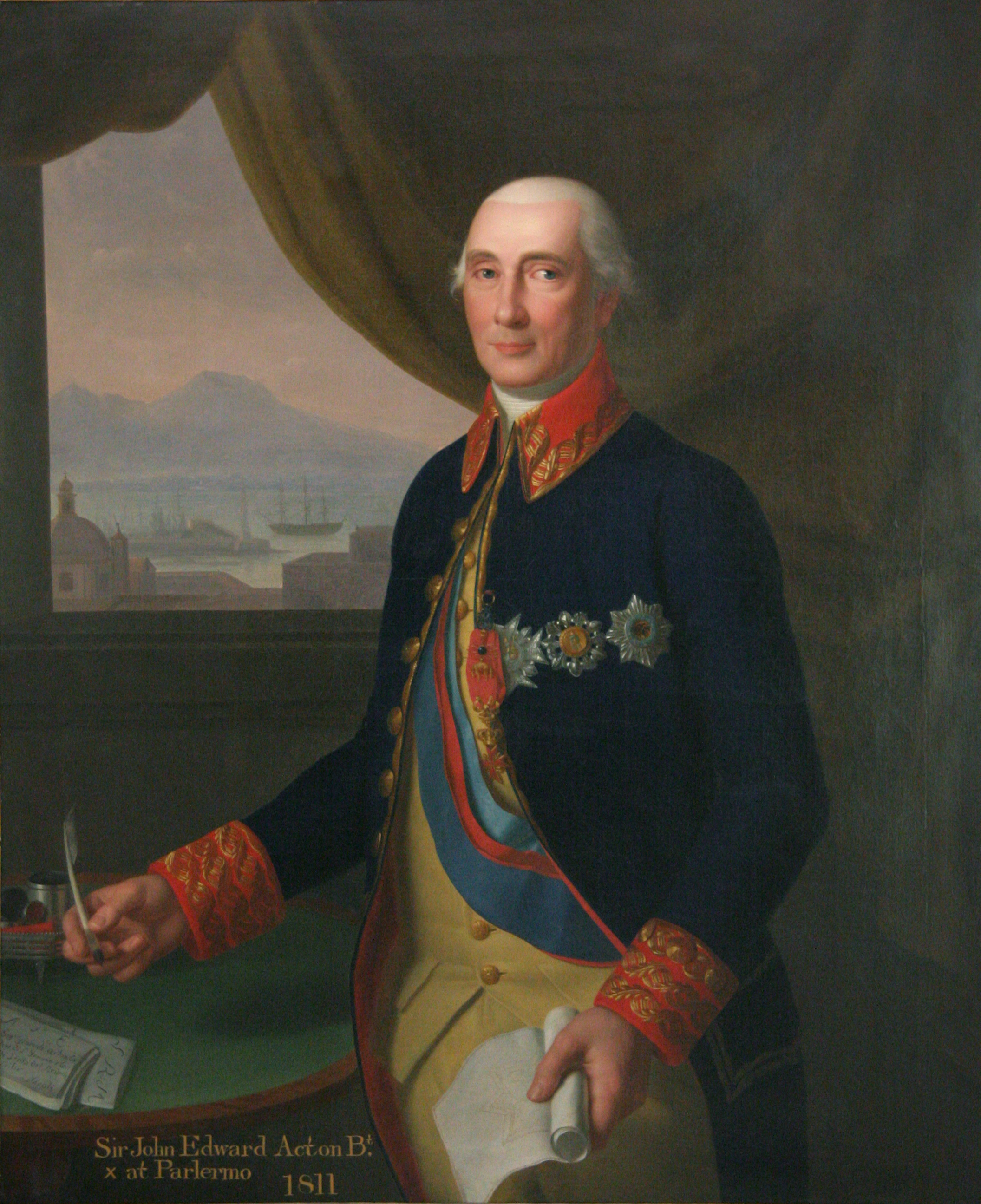
Sir John Acton

A new approach to training of officers happened after the dismissal of prime minister Tanucci. The influence of Queen Maria Carolina was decisive for the arrival of the English admiral John Acton, who first assumed the post of Secretary of the Navy, and later, against the inertia of the Marquis della Sambuca, also that of prime minister. Acton began a process of renewal that would allow considerably strengthen the ethical and moral uprightness of the officers, so that they could function as an example for the rest of the population. Realising also the need to update the process of formation, consistently with the evolution of military doctrine, he was the architect of a historic decision: in fact, he constituted a small group of officers, which ordered to visit the military training institutions in the different European countries, and to draw from them all organizational and practical training aspects, which served to build an academy of a new kind. Also included in this group was a young lieutenant of Military Engineering Corps by the name of Giuseppe Parisi. This choice was particularly happy, because thanks to the detailed reports of Parisi before, and his work in person then, would be born the Nunziatella. During the period abroad, specifically in Austria, he was able to be appreciated by the Emperor Joseph II of Habsburg-Lorraine, as well as the Imperial Chancellor Anton Wenzel von Kaunitz-Rietberg, who often invited him to lunch with Pietro Metastasio. His ability to fit into the environment of the Austrian court led him to receive even the insistent invitation from the emperor to remain as War Major. Refused the assignment, Parisi returned to his homeland in 1785, where he was promoted to the rank of major and began to roll out the plan for the foundation of the new Academy.

Far from being simply the local interpretation of the organization and methods of instruction observed abroad, the draft Parisi contained strong elements of originality, which would characterize the Nunziatella and would determine the uniqueness of the educational model. Unlike other military training institutions, it was held that the military training was strongly interconnected to the civilian one, so to lead to the formation not only of excellent officers, but also good citizens.

== The foundation ==
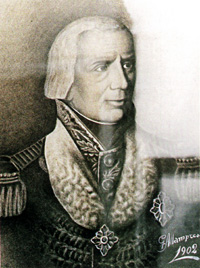
Giuseppe Parisi

Parisi, in his reforms, changed the site from the buildings and convents of the Panatica Palace to the site of the Jesuit novitiate of Pizzofalcone. The complex was built thanks to the generous donations of noblewomen Anna Mendoza, Marchioness della Valle and Countess of Sant'Angelo dei Lombardi, and Delia Sanseverino, Countess of Briatico. The donation was 19,500 ducats, divided in twelve years. The novitiate was opened on 8 September 1587, and had greeted the seminarians previously housed the novitiate of Nola. Along with the former seminary, they were granted an architectural jewel of the Neapolitan Baroque, the attached Church of the Nunziatella, so called to distinguish it from the larger Basilica of the Santissima Annunziata. Built in 1588, the church had been heavily remodeled in 1736 by the Ferdinando Sanfelice; and embellished with frescoes by Francesco De Mura, Paolo De Matteis, Ludovico Mazzanti and Pacecco De Rosa, as well as the splendid altar built by Giuseppe Sammartino.

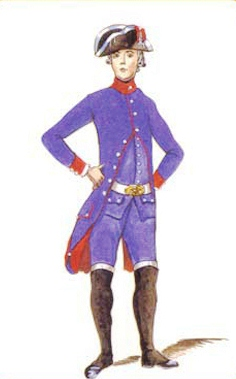
A Nunziatella cadet (1787)

The Nunziatella Military Academy was founded November 18, 1787 with the name of Royal Military Academy, by a special order of king Ferdinand IV. This document contained guidelines for the education of the students, in particular calling on officers and instructors to attend to "... the knowledge of the temperaments, inclinations and aptitudes of the students in order to be able to stimulate curiosity and increase the attention, talents and faculties, and finally, instilling in them a capacity for judgment". Similarly, it was felt necessary to introduce students to "mathematics ... and to firm up philosophical reasoning in young people and prepare them for the professions of science and to train them in the consciousness of their duties and the social and political system."

The first commander-in-chief of the Academy was Domenico della Leonessa, Marquis of Supino, who by a decree of 28 May 1787 was appointed by Minister John Acton and promoted to Field Marshal. Traditionally, however, the real flowering of Nunziatella is traced to the appointment in 1794 of Giuseppe Parisi as commander; the street where the school is located is still named after him.

La Nunziatella was quickly recognized as a major military academy, and Giuseppe Maria Galanti writes in 1792:

The way youth is educated here has no equals in the whole of Europe. No philosophy, patriottism, experience could have either conceived or built a nobler institution for growing character, reason, heart and every knowledge needed by soldiers.

— Giuseppe Maria Galanti

=== The Neapolitan Republic (1799) ===
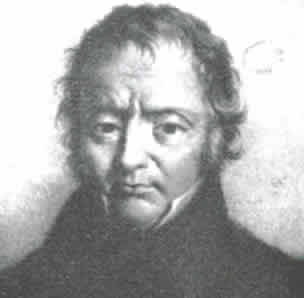
Carlo Lauberg

A few years after its foundation, the Nunziatella would be impacted by the reverberations of the French Revolution. The Neapolitan King Ferdinand IV was a Bourbon relative of the French king Louis XVI, while his wife Maria Carolina of Austria was Marie-Antoinette's sister. The level of police awareness against Jacobins' activities sharply rose, while the latter increased their attempts to influence the Neapolitan Army's commanding personnel: their aim was, indeed, to make military to support a revolt and pull the king out of his throne for building a Republic like in France.

Some of the professors of the Nunziatella began to spread Jacobin ideas among the cadets. For example, Annibale Giordano, had been arrested in the past in 1784, and deprived of his post of Chemistry teacher. The Maths teacher Carlo Lauberg and his colleagues Clino Roselli (fortifications teacher), Pasquale Baffi (Hellenist), Michele Granata (philosopher and mathematician) and Giustino Fortunato senior, as members of the Società Patriottica, were accused of voicing Republican ideals.

By 1798, French Republican armies had occupied the Papal States, exiling Pope Pius VI. On November 28, the Neapolitan government moved in arms against the fledgling Roman Republic, defeating opponents and coming to the reconquest of Rome in six days. However, this victory was short-lived, since by December 24, 1798, French troops commanded by General Jean Etienne Championnet defeated the Neapolitan Bourbon troops in the battle of Civita Castellana and forced them back to Naples. King Ferdinand fled by sea in Sicily, leaving the administration of the continental territories of the Kingdom to the regency of Francesco Pignatelli. In mid-January 1799, an armistice was signed between the French troops and representatives of the government of Naples; however, this was immediately rejected by "Lazzaroni" who found that a betrayal: this component of the Neapolitan people barricaded himself in defense of the city, by requisitioning the numerous weapons found in the city deposits.

Virtually all military units allocated in Naples suffered the seizure of weapons, but not the Nunziatella. Jacobin propaganda among the students, meant they sided with the republican revolutionaries during this riots. Under the command of Captain Pasquale Galluzzo, they repelled an assault of lazzari. At the end of the 18th century, most of the Nunziatella's professors were linked to the Freemasonry (among them: Granata and Baffi, as well as Giordano and Lauberg).

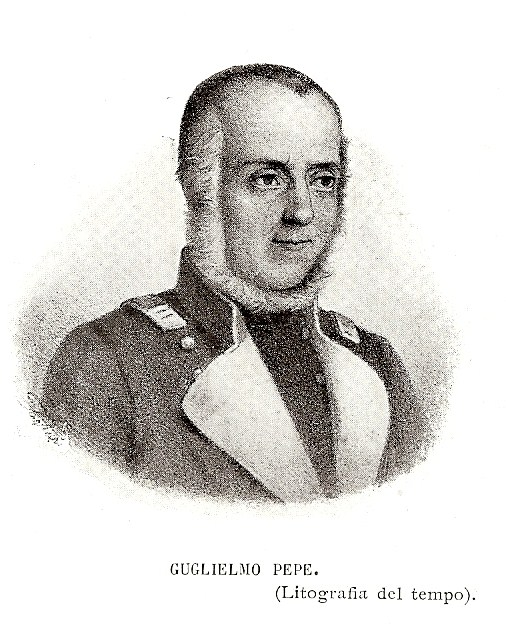

The fierce resistance of lazzari, which fought fiercely against an enemy much better organized and armed, was broken only by the French acquisition, via a betrayal, of Castel Sant'Elmo. From its position overlooking Naples, the French were able to bombard the city and thus end the popular revolt. This led to the proclamation of the Neapolitan Republic, where many teachers of Nunziatella had leading roles: Carlo Lauberg was head of the government, while Annibale Giordano was assigned to the Military Committee and then head of the accounting of the Navy. Also several alumni played a leading role: Leopoldo De Renzis, a distant relative of Carlo Lauberg, and Gabriele Manthoné were ministers of War and Navy, while notable roles were also Pietro Colletta, Guglielmo Pepe and Tommaso Susanna, who was part of the Government of the Republic as minister of war.

In June 1799, cardinal Fabrizio Ruffo entered in Naples with his troops and Nelson ordered the execution of Francesco Caracciolo, Saverio Granata and Pasquale Baffi. On July 27, king Fedinand signed the decree of suppression.

=== The first Restoration (1800-1805) ===
Reduced formally to male boarding school for orphans military (in fact they were really few), the Nunziatella regained the title of Royal Military Academy thanks to the work of its Commander, Captain Giuseppe Saverio Poli. On 1 December 1802 the new name became operational and Poli was promoted to lieutenant colonel in accordance with the new assignment. Two years later Poli managed to obtain the Nunziatella to be granted the status of "university", which opened the possibility reception of external students (elementary school children) to which he taught literature and mathematics, assisted by other officers and two Priests for the teaching of catechism.

The presence at Nunziatella of Poli, a distinguished physicist and malacologist would become the tutor of Francis I of the Two Sicilies, was also important for the strong impetus given to the endowment of the Physics Laboratory. Partly borrowed from that of the old Battaglione Real Ferdinando, it was equipped with all the latest equipment, so as to make it "(that) more complete and respectable (...) in Naples".

=== The French decade (1806-1815) ===
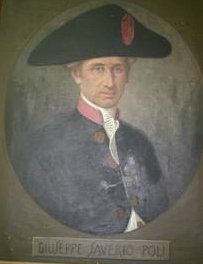
Giuseppe Saverio Poli

The conquest of the Kingdom by Napoleonic troops as part of the Austro-Neapolitan War, caused the loss of the rank and employment by Poli, who was reinstated at the end of 1810 with the rank of lieutenant and the appointment of library guardian. The captains employed to cadets' direction (Galileo Giuseppe Pasquali, Gaetano Ruiz, Andrea and Pasquale Galluzzo Colnago) maintained however rank and functions until 1812, when they were removed.

The new Murat regime had resulted in the reorganization of the Neapolitan armed forces and the reform also involved training institutions. Consequently, the Nunziatella suppressed as a military college; nevertheless it remained active in the building of Pizzofalcone as a school of theoretical and practical artillery, which served as a point of leverage for the reopening of the college. Interior Minister André-François Miot asked the inspector general of artillery Giuseppe Fonseca Chavez to submit a project dedicated to that end: the plan, presented May 10, 1806, proposed Nunziatella to be the only recruitment institute for the four Armies, like it was before 1799. Giuseppe Parisi himself wrote a project draft for Fonseca, proposing a "decree on the formation of the Military Academy." Under the new system they would be admitted to the Nunziatella 160 students aged 11 to 14 and 60 day students 15 years of age. The management would be guaranteed by 62 employees (24 officers, three administrative, 2 priests, 4 health, 19 professors and 10 masters), waiters, sergeants, Trabants and 10 horses. A total of 50 among the students would be selected for the school of application of artillery and engineering.

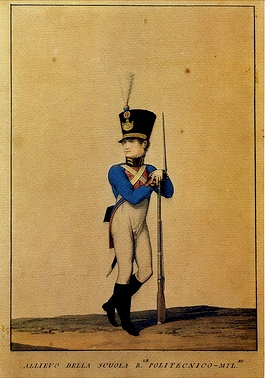
Nunziatella cadet (1805–1815)

Parisi's proposal was seconded by the one prepared by Vito Caravelli, a former professor of Nunziatella, that through Parisi transmitted it to the minister of war Mathieu Dumas, establishing school programs for science, design, Italian, French, English and practical training.

Accepted all suggestions, on the following 1 September Dumas wrote to Joseph Bonaparte, King of Naples, to propose "the temporary formation of a military school with 4/500 ducats per month, being only to pay the full wages of the professors of the ancient academy that (they were already) at half wage. " Dumas motivated further its proposal, emphasizing the need to train students for the armies of genius, artillery and Bridges' service and the opportunity offered from the building of the Nunziatella, which already housed a library and allowed the opening four days a week for both the French officers and the Neapolitans.

=== The second Restoration (1816-1854) ===
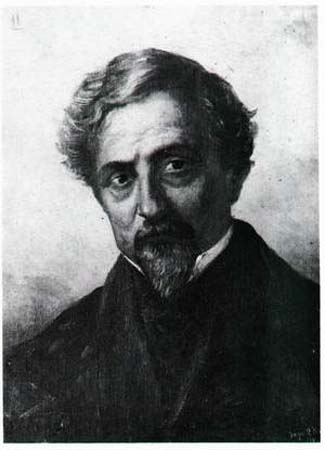
Mariano d'Ayala

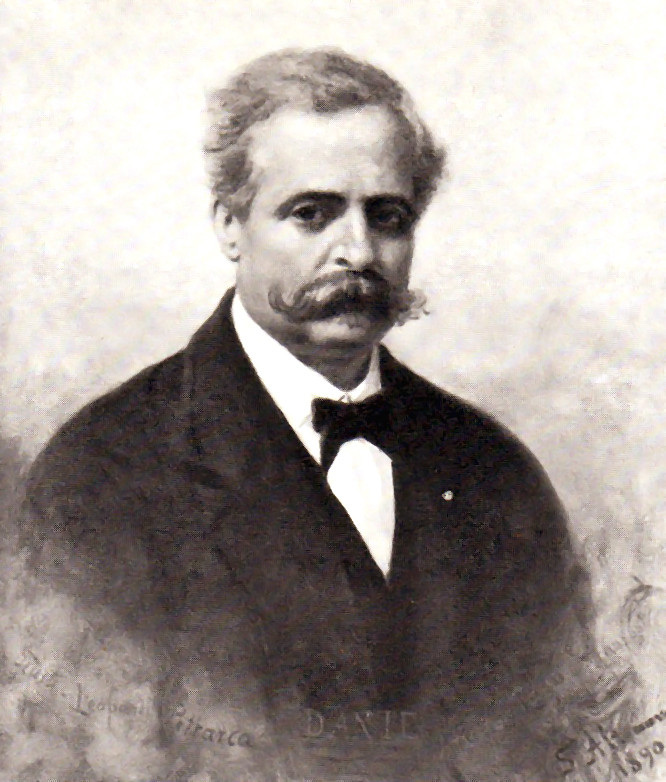
Francesco De Sanctis

For Nunziatella the period of the Second Restoration was a time of great cultural fervor, thanks to the arrival of some of the most qualified teachers of the time. Mariano d'Ayala, then first lieutenant and former student of the Nunziatella until 1828, was called in September 1837 to hold the post of instructor of ballistic and descriptive geometry. Once in the chair in place of major Niola (later instructor Francis II of the Two Sicilies) and thanks to the protection of Carlo Filangieri, Ayala strived to transfer to cadets the ideas taught in other countries Europeans. Far from being a purely theoretical exercise, the action of Ayala also expressed by building a relationship of great closeness to his students. This had a profound influence on the students of the time (which included Carlo Pisacane, Enrico Cosenz, Giuseppe Virgili and Salvatore Medina), and was the channel through which Ayala transferred to them his own ideas about the necessity of Italian unification.

The methods of teaching the young officer did not fail to worry the commander of the Nunziatella, major Michele Nocerino, who he reported to King Ferdinand II. When asking what happened, the king faced the defense of Filangieri, who convinced him not only to let go of Ayala in his work, but to accuse and to dismiss the commander Nocerino, who was succeeded by Colonel Francesco Antonio Winspeare.

The work of Ayala continued for another four years after this incident, during which, in addition to continuing to propagate the unitaristic ideals among students, merited a note of praise for leading with skill drills to the field of Capua and published the famous "Lessons of artillery", that contained the most advanced notions of time in the field, dedicated "To the beloved students".

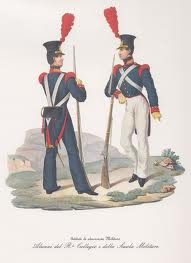
Nunziatella cadets (1834)

Ayala's career was cut short in 1843 by accident. In that year was published an issue of Iris, a publication which contained among others a paper by Basilio Puoti. This paper scandalized a princess because of his licentious character and she took the newspaper his father Ferdinand II because he intervened. Withholding the publication to become more aware of it, the kingalso read a paper by Ayala, who under the guise of a historical narrative concealed apology of Joachim Murat and his attempt to regain the Kingdom. Irritated and mindful of the warnings of the deposed captain Nocerino, Ferdinand II summoned Carlo Filangieri and this time attacked him and to notify that would remove the teacher. Attempts defense by Filangieri came to no avail, especially as its recommendation to Ayala to make amends and ask forgiveness of the king did not produce effect, as he preferred to resign on Aug. 3, 1843.

Francesco De Sanctis, one of the most important figures of Italian literature, came to the Nunziatella as a professor of literature April 19, 1841, thanks to the influence of Basilio Puoti, who was inspector to studies. At that time the letters kept private courses of grammar and literature in Vico Bisi. The influence of De Sanctis was naturally great on young cadets, but this process was neither simple nor immediate, as in the early years of teaching, as reported by his student Nicola Marselli, De Sanctis was the laughing stock of his students. However, things changed thanks to the great teaching skills of De Sanctis, to the point that when he was teaching students from other classes came to hear.

==== The 1848 riot ====
1848 was a pivotal year in the history of Europe, because, since the uprisings in Sicily in January, saw the beginning of the so-called "Spring of Nations". The revolt was soon extended to other parts of the Kingdom of the Two Sicilies involving numerous members of the middle class and intellectuals. When in May 1848 Francesco De Sanctis took part in the riots, several students followed him; but after the failure of the revolutionary movement the professor was impeached and removed from teaching in November. Gave himself fled, was captured in Cosenza in December 1849 and sent to prison in Castel dell'Ovo, where he remained for three years.

Other teachers of the Nunziatella, Enrico Alvino, Amante Fedele and Filippo Cassola, also participated in the riots of 1848. After the failure of the revolt, all three were removed from teaching.

=== The transfer to Maddaloni (1855–1859) ===
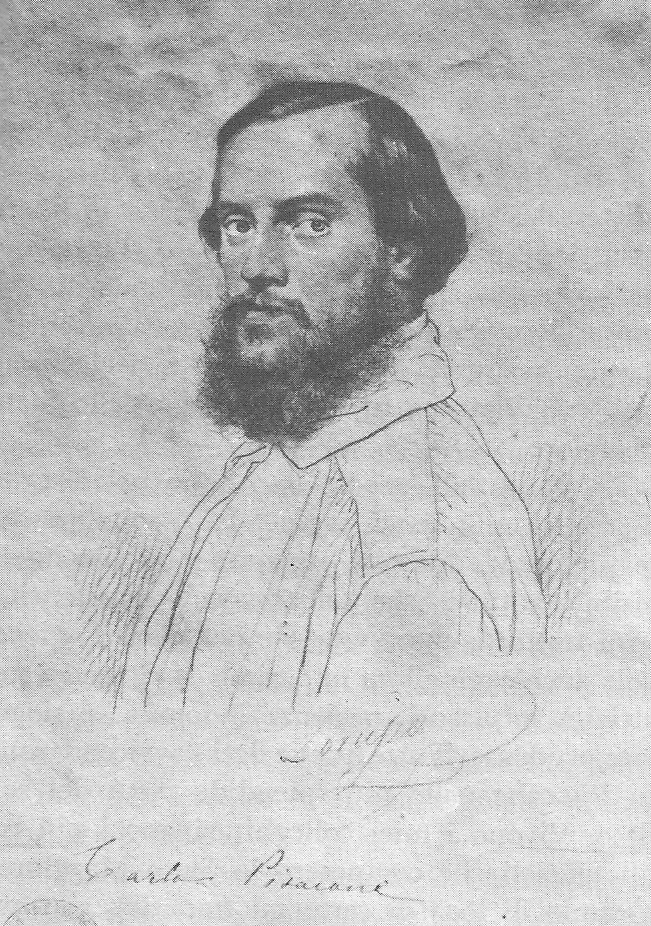
Carlo Pisacane

The revolutionary movements of 1848 marked a break point in the policy of Ferdinand II of the Two Sicilies and in particular on the training of managerial staff of the army. The attempt at revolution had in fact demonstrated how necessary to provide not only an appropriate number of officers to the Army, but also to prevent them, as usually volitional boys and sensitive to liberal propaganda, could be adversely affected by Piedmontese agents. For this reason and despite the opposition of the relatives of the students, most of whom resided in Naples, on April 27, 1855, resolved the transfer of the Nunziatella in Maddaloni, at the palace of the Dukes Carafa. This new location, in the intentions of the sovereign, would ensure the greater controllability of the students, thanks to the proximity of Maddaloni to the Royal Palace of Caserta.

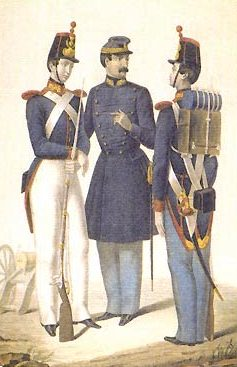
Officer and cadets of Nunziatella (1853)

Exile in Maddaloni lasted until Ferdinand II was alive, while the ascent to the throne of Francis II of the Two Sicilies, of a completely different temperament than his father, offered the occasion to those who advocated the return of the institute in the capital to do another attempt. Carlo Filangieri, was among the leading opponents of the transfer of the Nunziatella in Maddaloni and was in the forefront in putting pressure on the young king because it would put an end to expulsion of the institute from Naples. Arguing that attempts of troublemakers were present in both big cities, and in small towns, Filangieri was finally able to get it to be a date for the return, decided to 7 September 1859. The news was received with great jubilation by students, and was even staged a comeback in solemn form, with celebratory banquets and thanksgiving masses. The news of such effusions of joy reached and upset the king, who was staying at the Royal Palace of Portici, urging him to send a telegram in the late afternoon of September 6, which canceled the transfer order. To the protests of Filangieri, Francis II replied with another telegram, in which he deplored the excessive displays of joy that were planned and ordered the postponement of the transfer. As per provisions of the King, the students spent the 7th on the road, having lunch at the Bridges of the Valley and returning to the city without further celebrations.

In this period were some Nunziatella alumni played an important role in the history of the Kingdom of the Two Sicilies. In particular, Giuseppe Ghio was in command of the troops who in 1857 stopped in Padula the revolutionist Carlo Pisacane, another Nunziatella former student. The ill-fated expedition of Pisacane, that the intention was supposed to trigger the uprising of Cilento, was the inspiration for the famous poem La spigolatrice di Sapri by Luigi Mercantini.

=== The fall of the Two Sicilies (1860–1861) ===
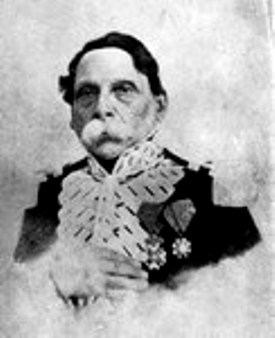
Francesco Traversa

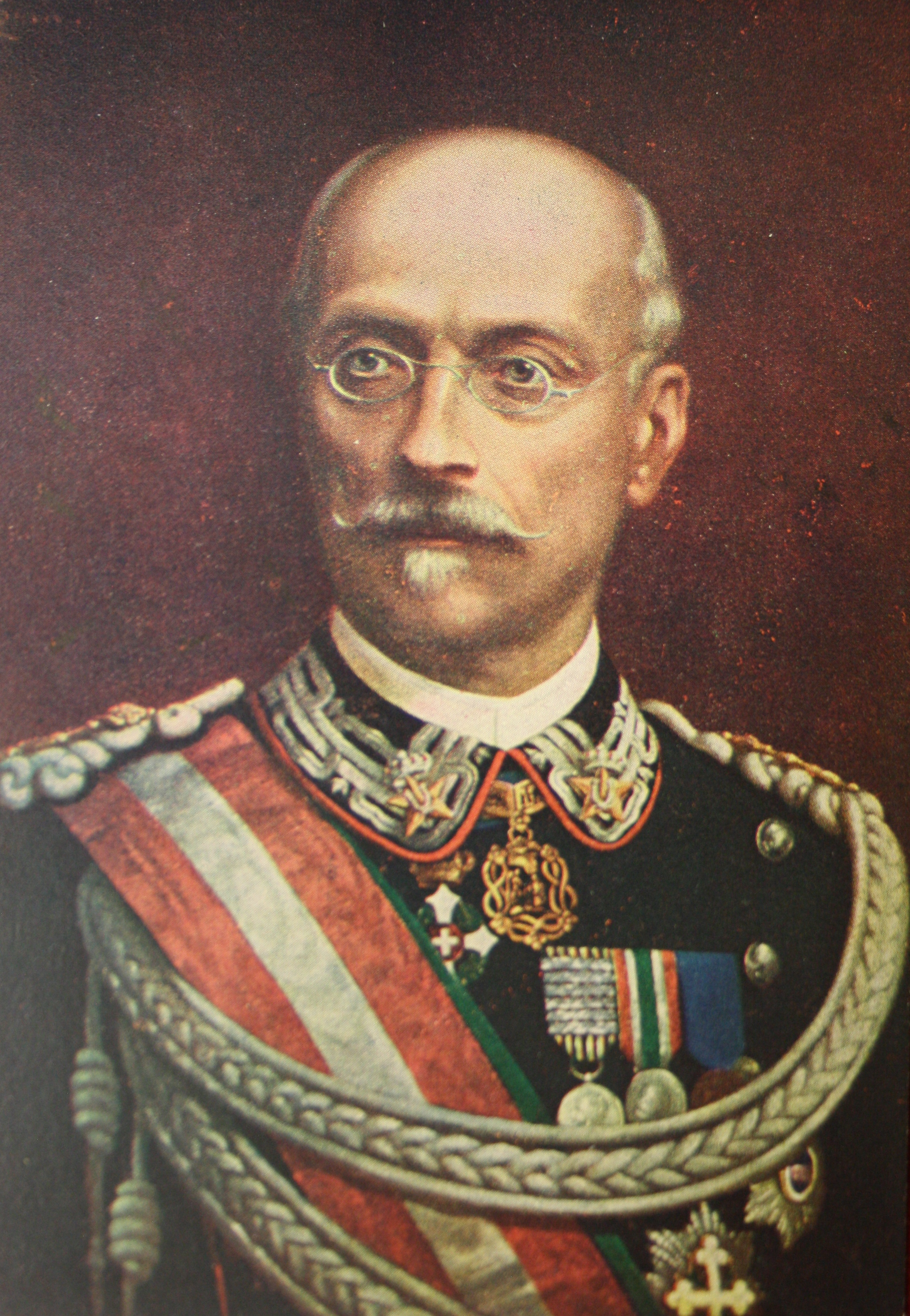
Enrico Cosenz

Events related to Mille expedition and the subsequent invasion of the Kingdom of the Two Sicilies by the Armata Sarda saw former students of the Nunziatella on both sides of the battle.

Among the protagonists of the Bourbon side, Ferdinando Beneventano del Bosco was engaged in fighting in Sicily subsequent to the landing of Garibaldi's troops. He engaged the enemy troops after the Battle of Calatafimi, forcing them to divert to Corleone before moving to Palermo. After the occupation of the latter by the Garibaldi troops, he launched an assault on the city, and he was stopped only by the news of the truce signed by Giuseppe Garibaldi with General Lanza. Then he held the fortress of Milazzo up to the order of capitulation, and later he fought during the Siege of Gaeta and led several legitimist attempts after the fall of the Two Sicilies. The aforementioned Giuseppe Ghio was responsible for the surrender without a fight of about 12,000 men of the Army of Two Sicilies in Soveria Mannelli. This episode, which opened the doors to Garibaldi in Naples, probably led him to be murdered there a few years later.

Among the alumni on the Bourbon side which died during the invasion by Piedmont has to be remembered Brigadier Matteo Negri, which fell during the Battle of Garigliano and was buried with a solemn ceremony in Cathedral of Saints Erasmus and Marciano and Santa Maria Assunta by order of the king Francis II. While in command of its troops and although wounded several times, he continued to give orders and to encourage his men, until, after allowing for all Bourbon forces to cross the river in the direction of Gaeta, he died in his place.

During the siege of Gaeta fell Lieutenant Colonel Paolo de Sangro Prince of Sansevero, grandson of Raimondo de Sangro: seriously injured following the explosion of the Cittadella battery, he died shortly after. In the same blast was also killed Lt. Gen. Francesco Traversa another Nunziatella alumnus.

Also many students of Nunziatella left the School and participated in the fighting on the side of the Army of the Two Sicilies. Their presence on the front of the fire was a result of the events related to the departure of Francis II of Naples: the commander Muratti, immediately switched to the side of Garibaldi, and imposed the oath of allegiance to the students who wanted to remain in the institute.

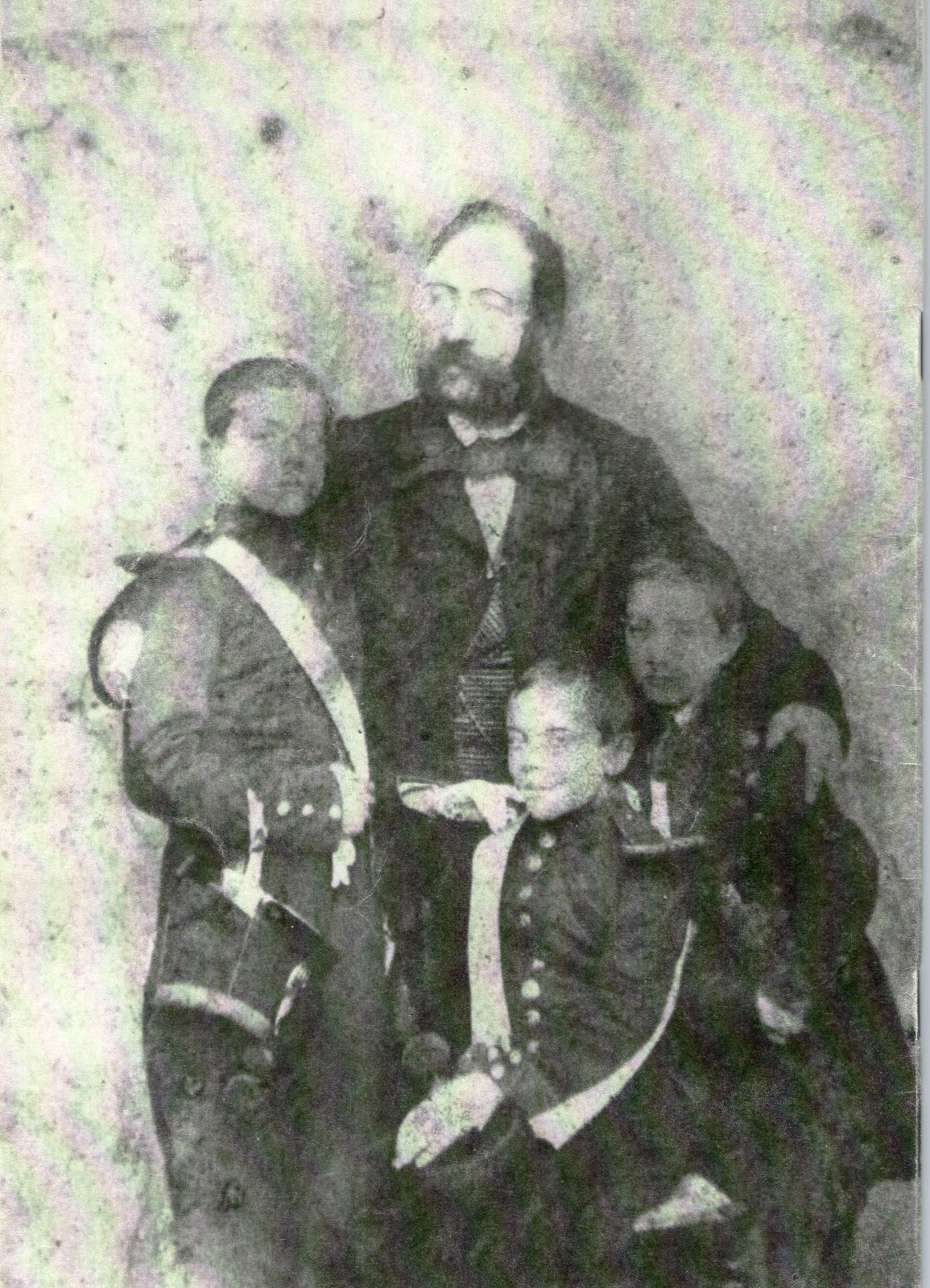
Giuseppe Campanelli with his children, Nunziatella cadets (c. 1857)

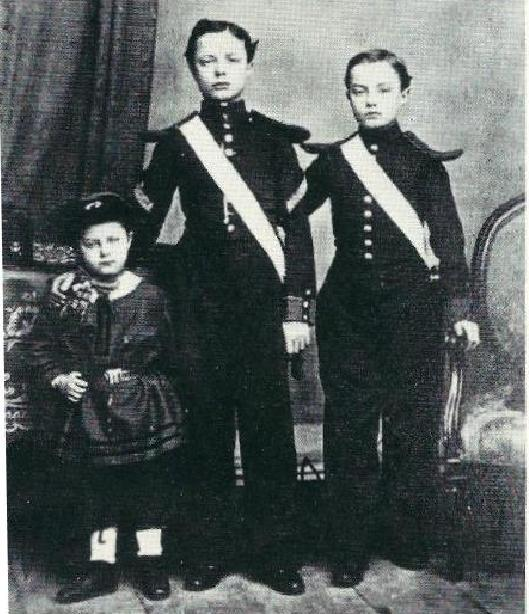
Nunziatella cadets, 1860

Among those who refused and fled the school they are to remember the brothers Antonio and Eduardo Rossi sixteen and fourteen years old, after remembered by the French journalist Charles Garnier for their heroic behavior; the seventeen-year-old son of Eliezer Nicoletti, son of Domenico (commanding officer of the 6th regiment of line "Farnese" that defeated the partisans of Pilade Bronzetti during battle of the Volturno). In September 1860 he went from Nunziatella first to Capua and then to Gaeta, where he participated in the defense of the fortress as a standard bearer of artillery; Ludovico Manzi of seventeen and nineteen Ferdinand de Liguori, son of the colonel the 9th Puglia; Alfonso Scotti Douglas eleven-year-old son of General Luigi Scotti Douglas, who participated in the work of the genius in the fortress of Capua; Francesco and Felice Afan de Rivera, fifteen and sixteen years of age (children of the General Gaetano Afan de Rivera, and descendants of viceroy of Naples Afán Fernando de Ribera), they reached their older brothers in the siege of Capua; Francesco Pons de Leon, eighteen, reached in Gaeta his father a Major of the Army, and served as artillery servant; Fernando Ruiz, seventeen, grandson of General Peter Vial and acquired grandson by Ludovico Quandel, arrived in Gaeta in early January 1861, after overcoming great difficulties for the ongoing clashes; Ferdinando and Manfredi Lanza, fifteen and sixteen-year-old children of an officer of Engineers, the first of whom lost a foot during the last day of the siege; and finally the ensign Carlo Giordano, seventeen and orphaned a few months before of the father general, who fled from the Nunziatella on October 10, was artillery servant at battery Malpasso and was killed in the outbreak of Battery Transylvania, hit while the negotiations were under way for the surrender.

Baron Roberto Pasca ex-student of the course 1838-41 and commander of the Partenope (the only warship that followed Francis II in Gaeta), the head of staff of artillery Giovanni delli Franci ex-student of the course 1840–45 and the general chief of staff Francesco Antonelli ex-student of the course 1817-23 were the signatories of the surrender of the fortress Gaeta. Many years later, another alumnus, the former captain of artillery Vincenzo Scala, a protagonist of 'siege of Messina, would be among the signatories of the Act of Cannes, which marked the final renunciation of claims to the throne of Naples advanced by Prince Carlo Tancredi of Bourbon-Two Sicilies (the second son of Alfonso of Bourbon-Two Sicilies, Count of Caserta) for himself and his descendants.

Among the protagonists of the Savoy side must be remembered Enrico Cosenz, which landed in Sicily with the third expedition: Cosenz was instrumental during the Battle of Milazzo, during which he rejected the attack on the Bourbon left the grid and was wounded in the neck. He landed in Calabria on August 23, 1860, led the column that allowed him to surround and force the surrender of two brigades to Bourbon Villa San Giovanni and Piale. He was also the protagonist of the surrender of the troops of Giuseppe Ghio in Soveria Mannelli. He came to Naples with Garibaldi, assumed the post of Minister of War and took part in the organization of the plebiscite of 21 October 1860.

== The Kingdom of Italy (1861-1946) ==
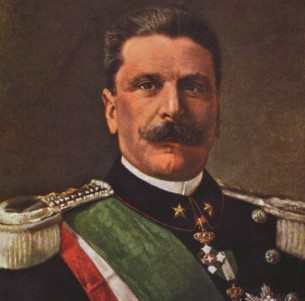
Alberto Pollio

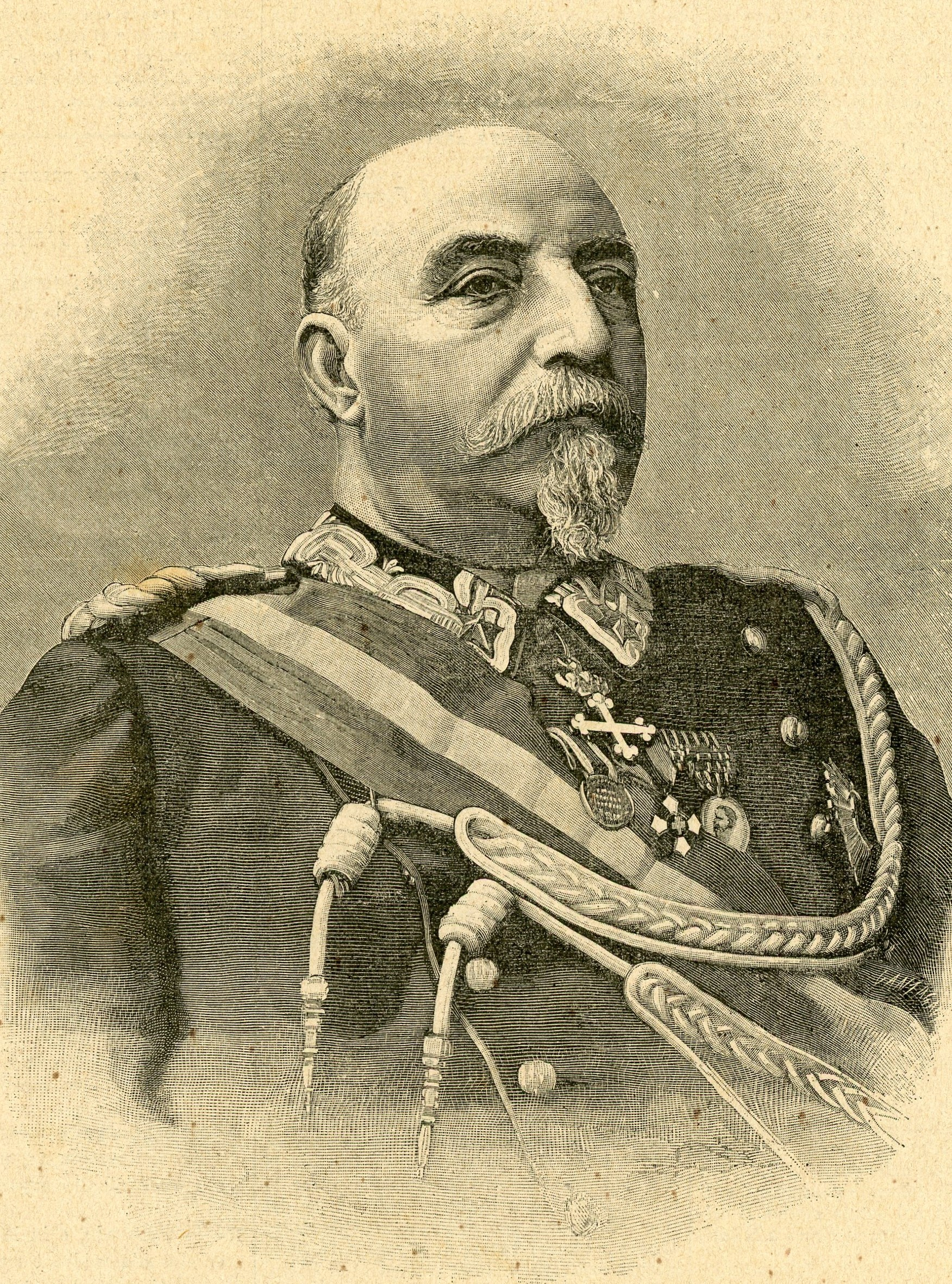
Domenico Primerano

Upon the fall of the Kingdom of the Two Sicilies, with the surrender of the fortress of Civitella, 3,684 officers were on active duty in the army. Of these 341 artillery officers and 215 Engineering officers came from the Nunziatella.

Although it had proved, since its inception, to be a "seedbed of good specialist officers", the Nunziatella followed the fate of so many institutions of the former Kingdom of the Two Sicilies and by decree of Victor Emmanuel II of 4 May 1861 it was transformed from academia to military school of the Army: this operation provided that it was intended to prepare young people for life weapons, in view of their admission to the Academy of artillery and engineering of Turin and at the School of Infantry and Cavalry of Modena. The new regulations of the renamed Military College of Naples was established by a decree of 6 April 1862 and provided for the admission of boys between thirteen and sixteen who had completed his high school studies. The total number of students was fixed at a maximum value of 250 units.

Among others, Congressman Giuseppe Ricciardi in 1861 complained in Parliament that act, by inserting it into a broader discontent for the abolition of other cultural institutions Neapolitan; and a few years later, in 1870, was the former student and professor Mariano d'Ayala to fight in the Parliament of the Kingdom of Italy against the new threat of suppression.

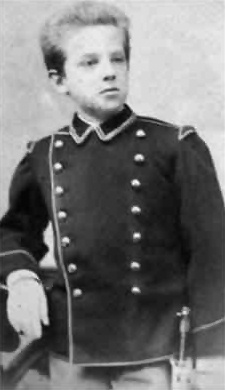
Victor Emmanuel III dressed in the Nunziatella uniform (about 1888)

Nevertheless, the Nunziatella made a major contribution to the training of managerial staff of the Army, so that the three former students Enrico Cosenz (1882–1893), Domenico Primerano (1893–1896) and Alberto Pollio (1908–1914) they were respectively the first, second and fourth Army Chief of Staff.

The attitude of distrust of senior management against the former army of the Two Sicilies and the Nunziatella went through was mitigated over the years, so much so that in 1881 the fifteen-years-old designated heir to the throne of Italy, Vittorio Emanuele III, was admitted as a Nunziatella student. The king always retained a strong attachment to the Nunziatella and participated personally in the celebrations for the 150th anniversary of its foundation.

=== Colonial wars ===
The latter part of the nineteenth century, and similar to what already done by other European powers, the Kingdom of Italy was engaged in a colonial policy that saw this long in Ethiopia and Eritrea.

The colonial period saw alumni participate in operations in Africa and among the fallen in this period remembers the captain Andrea De Benedictis, was killed in 1887 during the battle of Dogali; and on 26 January 1891 a plaque was dedicated to him in the Great Courtyard of the Nunziatella. This period was also of great importance for the history of the school, mainly as a result of the disastrous Battle of Adwa on 1 March 1896: it was during this fight, in fact, that was assigned to a former student the first gold medal for military valor after the Italian unification. The artillery captain Eduardo Bianchini, son of the eminent economist of the Kingdom of the Two Sicilies Luigi Bianchini, sacrificed himself in place with its mountain battery to allow the Italian main force to fold in front of the enemy offensive from Adwa.

The disaster of Adwa had significant consequences not only on the national political level (Prime Minister Francesco Crispi was forced to resign) but also on the attitude of the population towards the military life. Despite the presence in the body of teachers personality which included Camillo De Nardis, Michelangelo Schipa and Agesilao Greco, the number of applications for admission to the Nunziatella, like other military training institutions, experienced a steep fall. The bleeding was such that in 1898 students were reduced to just seventy-six, two hundred less than the period in which he had frequented Vittorio Emanuele III, and it was even proposed the elimination of the institute.

To counteract the trend it was tried to make the school more attractive by taking a first reorganization of the studies, promulgated by decree of October 19, 1896, followed by a second reorganization of 20 May 1908. If the first initiative did not produce significant results, the Depending served instead in order: in it for the first time abolished the requirement for students to pursue a career in the military academy and opened the possibility of attending civil university instead. The reform was intended to form, in addition to future military cadres, citizens as well, that while occupying high positions in the future in civilian life, would have retained a strong link with the military environment, thus functioning as a bond with the nation. The number of students grew steadily to over three hundred units on the eve of the First World War.

=== First World War (1915–1918) ===
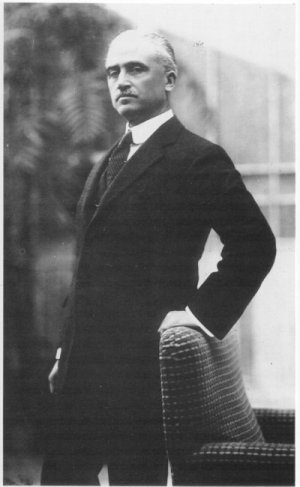
Antonino Di Giorgio

In 1913 the role of the Nunziatella as an educational institution for the elite military cadres was renewed by the enrollment of the Prince Amedeo of Savoy Aosta: this event caused the School Command to build a network of formality around the young prince, who instead quickly unraveled it, establishing an equal relationship with his classmates. At the outbreak of the First World War, Prince Amedeo requested and received permission to enlist as a private in the Horse Artillery Regiment "Voloire" and fought on the front of the Carso.

Besides Amedeo d'Aosta, many other alumni participated in the First World War on the Italian front, sometimes playing important roles in the war fortunes: among them are notable Pasquale Oro, Giuseppe Pennella and Antonino Di Giorgio. The first, as Commander in Chief of the 34th Division Alpini, was committed to the defense of the Asiago Plateau and fought in contrast to the Austro-Hungarian Strafexpedition; he blocked the enemy, and counter-attacked on the slopes of the Pasubio, thus marking decisively the tide of war. The second, the former Commander of Grenadiers of Sardinia, when in command of the 8th Army was the protagonist of the battles of the Solstice and Vittorio Veneto. The third, major general, commander of the 51st Division in Valsugana, while in Rome was reached by the news of the disaster of Caporetto and immediately left to Udine and took command of the Special Army Corps rapidly formed, which led bucking the stream of stragglers retreating from Caporetto; by engaging strongly the Austro-Germans allowed the main force of Italian to escape; and he was the last general to cross the Piave with his men on the morning of November 9, 1917. After the war, he became Minister of War and entrepreneur in his native Sicily.

Among the former students involved in the First World War, eight gained the gold medal for military valor. In this regard, they have to be remembered general Gabriele Berardi, commander of the Sassari Brigade, Umberto Cerboni and Eduardo Suarez, whose names were immortalized on Mount Pasubio in the so-called Street of Heroes; the young Nicola Nisco and Maurizio De Vito Piscicelli and Filippo Zuccarello. Also decorated the highest award for military valor, Ildebrando Goiran and Gaetano Carolei instead survived the conflict, achieving high grades in military and civilian life.

On April 21, 1920, in the entrance hall of the school was located a rock of the Venetian Alps surmounted by an eagle and a flag, in memory of all former students who died during the war. It bears the engraved inscription: "This bloody rock of Mount Grappa, mute, solemn witness of magnificent Italian feats, perpetuates the memory of those former cadets of the college, famous for glorious secular tradition, which fell fighting bravely in the war of liberation."

In addition to the already mentioned gold medals, on the monument were engraved the names of the colonels Fileno Briganti jr. and Vincenzo Galasso, respectively commanders of the brigades "Pisa" and "Napoli", to which were added those of five colonels, six lieutenant colonels, nine majors, two captains, twenty captains, three lieutenants, lieutenants thirty, forty-two lieutenants, a sergeant cadet, a cadet infantry officer and a soldier, for a total of one hundred-twenty fallen. Among them it was particularly significant in the case of Alessandro De Mandato, the cadet sergeant: while he was still at the Nunziatella, he was reached by the news of the death of his father at the front and decided to avenge him as soon as possible; in March 1917, just awarded the baccalaureate, he left for the war, and fell in combat in the area of Dosso Faiti only two months later. During the consecration ceremony of the monument all the names of the fallen were called and for each a joint answered "present"; the mother of De Mandato, oppressed by the loss of both the husband and the child, could not answer and a young cadet answered instead.

Traditionally, when cadets and alumni pass by what soon became known as il Masso (the Boulder), they make the military salute.

=== Fascism ===
The gradual militarization of Italian society fostered by the fascist regime naturally affected the Nunziatella. To the institute, as much as to the Military College in Rome and the one in Milan (restored in 1935 but closed in 1943), it was dedicated great attention in view of the expansionistic objectives that the regime and the Crown were devising. Of course, this approach did not admit any deformity in the opinions of those who had responsibility in the education of young students: the professor of literature and philosophy Floriano del Secolo, signatory of the Manifesto of the Anti-Fascist Intellectuals, was dismissed from his post in 1925 for refusing to swear allegiance to the Fascist Party.

In 1933 the Nunziatella received from his former cadet Victor Emmanuel III the honor to bear the motto Victoriae Regem dedit (Gave the King of the Victory), which obviously alluded to the attendance of the institute by the king himself. In that period, as in all institutions of basic military training, Nunziatella cadets were made obliged to pursuing careers in the Military Academies, thus restoring the rule prior to the 1908 reform. On 25 April 1934 the Prince of Piedmont Umberto of Savoy gave the Nunziatella the labarum, equalized to war flag; a few months later, on November 18, it was celebrated the 150th anniversary of its foundation, during a solemn ceremony that saw the participation of the king and the heir to the throne. The military deployment, in addition to cadets Battalion, was formed by several former cadets (including many classmates of Vittorio Emanuele III) under the command of Lieutenant-General Carlo Perris, the highest-ranking among those present.

Among the alumni of notice from this period worth mentioning Angelo Gatti, who was appointed a member of the Academy of Italy in 1937; Federico Baistrocchi was Chief of Staff of the Royal Army from 1 October 1934 to 7 October 1936, and Senator. Alberto De Marinis Stendardo di Ricigliano, Brigadier General, was a senator and Minister of the Kingdom of Italy; General of Army Corps and senators were also Carlo Perris, Guido Guidotti and Armando Tallarigo.

=== World War II ===
The events of World War II also interested gradually the city of Naples, therefore involving students of the Nunziatella. Initially of low intensity, the Allied air raids had in a first period no other consequences on the lives of cadets than to force them to take refuge in an underground shelter in the underlying Chiatamone street. After the disastrous bombing of 4 December 1942 that left more than 500 victims in the city and after 15 December 1942 and 1 January 1943 ones, it was decided, however, to transfer the cadets. The school was moved from March to December 30, 1943, in Benevento, and hosted in the building later seat of the city hospital; this displacement was of great harm to the Nunziatella, since for the looting carried out by German troops in Benevento was lost almost all of the material transported there, except for of the physics laboratory and warehouse assets, which had remained in Naples.

Although most of the staff went to Benevento with the cadets, in Naples there was a handful of officers and professors led by Professor Francesco Caruso. It was thanks to these few that it was possible to maintain a presence inside the building, which would have passed through difficult times after the Allied occupation.

During the conflict and in the aftermath, the alumni were committed as ever in the most senior positions in the military hierarchy and politics. Vittorio Ambrosio, former chief of staff of the Army, was chief of the General Staff; Antonio Sorice instead held the post of Minister of War in the Badoglio government, succeeded by Taddeo Orlando, lately the Commander-in-Chief of the Carabinieri.

A large number of former students fought on all fronts of the ongoing conflict and many victims were counted. Twenty-three of them deserved the gold medal for military valor, falling on the field and being protagonist in important moments of collective Italian memory. In particular, Amedeo di Savoia-Aosta was protagonist of the heroic Italian resistance during the second battle of Amba Alagi; Antonio Cianciullo and Alfredo Sandulli Mercuro were among the victims of the massacre of Kefalonia; Alberto Bechi Luserna was the star of the second battle of El Alamein; Roberto Lordi and Romeo Rodriguez Pereira were among the fallen of the Fosse Ardeatine; Luigi Tandura participated in the Italian Resistance as partisan of Osoppo Brigades. Among those who survived the conflict they are to remember Luigi Pecora, who participated in the fighting of the Four Days of Naples and Giuseppe Izzo, the protagonist of the second battle of El Alamein and the War of Liberation.

=== The Italian Republic (1946-present) ===
The Nunziatella was the training school for Vittorio Emanuele III and Amedeo d'Aosta and then was seen as an expression of the monarchical and fascist regime. The work of contact with the High Allied Command under the auspices of the former student Vittorio Ambrosio, had the effect to prevent its closure, but in heavy conditions: the institution was downgraded to high school boarding civil students. They were forced to take lessons in confined spaces, while most of the building was occupied by a British command and troops from Palestina.

After the conclusion of World War II the conditions of surrender of the Kingdom of Italy had a strong impact on the armed forces of the country: these were, in fact, subject to a number of heavy layoffs and limitations, such as the prohibition of building aircraft carriers and demobilization of several departments. Even training institutions of the newborn Italian Army were affected by this policy, so that the military schools in Rome and Milan were suppressed. Even the Nunziatella risked closure but professors, officers and alumni of the School made common cause, raising a strong protest movement that also involved the public Neapolitan was placed strong emphasis on the ancient and glorious roots of the institute by the Bourbons forward and one of the professors, Francesco Caruso, came to rally the undersecretary of defense Mario Palermo, a former student of the course 1914–1917, with the phrase: "Would you have the courage to sign the decree on the abolition of the Military College, with so many glories in his bright past, where you yourself were educated? Well, the Nunziatella must not die!". The commander Oliviero Prunas sought and obtained to be received by Umberto II, before whom shouted "Majesty, the Nunziatella must live." Made a commitment to do everything possible to put the school in a position to operate, Prunas began traveling all Italy with some military trucks, and collecting as many military materials and life commodities could be useful to the life of the institution.

The courses of the Nunziatella in Naples resumed on 1 February 1944, but with many mutilations with respect to the past. During the years 1944–45 both officials that cadets dressed civilian clothes, and then switched to a momentary black uniform during 1945–46. In 1946 the khaki uniform was restored instead, which was eventually replaced by the traditional historical uniform in 1954. On 1 September 1949, the Nunziatella regained the name of the Military College of Naples and the next May 24, 1950 saw the return of the school flag during a ceremony at the Diaz square, in Francesco Caracciolo street. In 1953 the name changed again in the final "Nunziatella" Military School.

The experience of the danger of suppression had deeply marked the alumni, that in March 1950 formed an association, and elected general Silvio Brancaccio as its president; and the attorney Raffaele Girolamo Maffettone as its secretary. The purpose of the association, according to the statutes, is to "keep alive the spirit and traditions of the Nunziatella and supporting its initiatives of any kind." The first activity of the association was to organize a large reunion of all former cadets at the day of the founding of the school: the reunion, which took place between 17 and 18 November 1955, saw the presence of over a thousand participants. That of 1955 was the beginning step of a long tradition of presence of the alumni to the oath of new cadets, which assumed special solemnity on November 18, 1987, when the Nunziatella celebrated 200 years since the foundation.

Put behind the war, Nunziatella alumni continued to play important roles in the military and civil life of the country. Between 1969 and 2012 ten of the deputy commanders-in-chief of Carabinieri (Vittorio Fiore, Attilio Boldoni, Vito De Sanctis, Michele Vendola, Paolo Bruno Di Noia, Virgilio Chirieleison, Ermanno Vallino, Goffredo Mencagli, Giorgio Piccirillo, Michele Franzé and Carlo Gualdi) were former cadets of the Nunziatella and continued in several cases the career occupying the leaders of the security services. Giuseppe Cucchi was director general of the Department of information security.

In 2001, almost all the leaders of the Italian Armed Forces were by former Nunziatella cadets: Rolando Mosca Moschini, former commander of the Guardia di Finanza, and the future president of the European Union Military Committee (EUMC), was the chief of staff of the defense; Sandro Ferracuti was the Chief of Staff of the Italian Air Force; Umberto Guarnieri, was the Chief of Staff of the Navy; Alberto Zignani was the commander-in-chief of the Guardia di Finanza.

In civilian life they have particularly distinguished Ettore Gallo, president of the Constitutional Court; Claudio Azzolini, Vice President of the Parliamentary Assembly of the Council of Europe; Arturo Parisi, descendant of Giuseppe Parisi was defense minister; Eugenio Barba, one of the leading intellectuals European and winner of the Sonning Prize; Ettore Pancini, a distinguished physicist that was among the discoverers of the muon; Stefano Dubay, winner of the Academy Award for Best Animated Movie in 2014 as a member of the artistic team of Frozen; and the edition of 2015 for Big Hero 6, for which he made the protagonist Baymax; and the poet Salvatore Angius, winner in 2015 of the International Simon Bolivar Award, awarded by UNESCO.

The former cadets of the Nunziatella were also present as protagonists, as in the past, in important moments of collective national history: Franco Angioni led the Italian expedition in Lebanon, the first international commitment of Italy to outside its borders after the Second World War; Francesco Gentile fell in combating South Tyrolean separatists; Marco Mattiucci is, in turn, fell heroically in Sarno during the disastrous landslide of 1998; Sergio De Caprio, better known as "Capitano Ultimo" is the police officer who materially he captured Salvatore Riina, the "boss of bosses" of the Cosa Nostra; Ottavio Oro has been in charge of the investigation for the capture of the Camorra boss Giuseppe Setola.

On August 5, 2014, alumni Riccardo Innocenti (class 1984–87) and Francesco Battaglia (class 1985–88) have ascended for the first time ever a summit of the massif of Karakoram in Pakistan and named it "Nunziatella Peak".

In the historic day of 15 November 2014, in the presence of Interior Minister Angelino Alfano, the defense minister Roberta Pinotti, the mayor of Naples, Luigi De Magistris and the president of the National Alumni Association Alessandro Ortis, it was signed an agreement that sanctioned the transfer to the Nunziatella of the Gran Distretto di Pizzofalcone complex, born as barracks of the grenadiers of the Royal Guard in the nineteenth century, and subsequently assigned to the State Police. This agreement is of particular importance for the Nunziatella, as it allows you to expand and qualify relay spaces, and opens the way the transformation of Nunziatella in European military school.

=== Nunziatella today ===
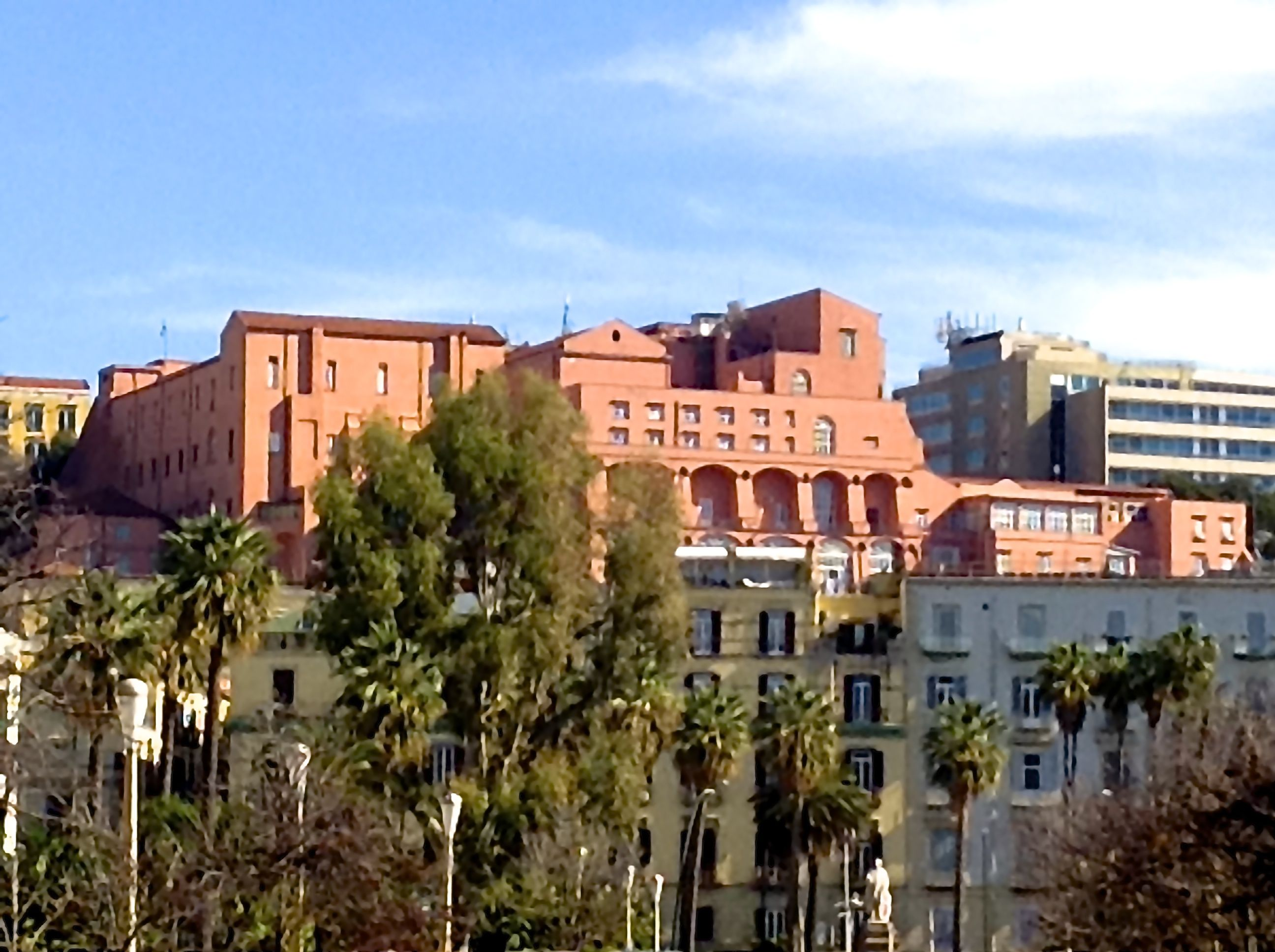
Nunziatella complex (2015)

The "Nunziatella" Military School can be attended only by students who have completed two years of either humanistic or scientific high school. Admission is by competition, which consists of medical, aptitude, athletic test and cultural examinations on the study subjects of the first two years of high school. The course of study at the school is completed with the achievement of baccalaureate and includes, in addition to academic subjects that are common to these high schools, also training courses aimed at a military career.

Military activities are carried out during the school year through special training in "weapons theory and practice", "military law" and other disciplines of the same area. At the end of each year of study, students also attend a weapon drill camp at some operative unit of the armed forces (for example at the Alpine training center of Aosta or 186º Parachute Regiment "Folgore" of Siena) to acquire practical elements of combat training, including the frequency of sessions at the shooting range with the individual weapon (rifle Beretta AR 70/90 supplied to the Italian armed forces, while for the parade activities it is still used the rifle M1 Carbine).

Particularly rich is the sports training that allows cadets to practice horse riding, fencing, swimming, athletics, boxing, basketball, volleyball and other sports. The Nunziatella is, along with the Morosini, the institution with the most wins at the inter-school Military Sports Games, an event where students of the four Italian military schools are measured on all sports.

The commander of the school (a colonel in the Italian Army) is also the dean of the institute. The recruitment of teachers is by competition, whose basic requirement is to be a confirmed professor at a high school.

After graduating, alumni can continue training in the military by applying for admission at all the Academies of the Italian armed forces, where is reserved for them a share of the available positions. Alternatively, those who want to pursue a military career can continue their training process at the university.

Alumni use to gather at the oath of the new cadets, which usually takes place on November 18 of each year (Nunziatella's foundation anniversary), in Piazza del Plebiscito in Naples.

A major annual event is the Nunziatella Graduation Ball, in recent years combined with the Debutante Ball: This is an event of great importance in the lives of cadets, since it concludes the cycle of studies at the School, and it is increasingly assuming the role of a prominent social event for the city of Naples, as to be regularly followed by the media. Normally, the event is selected for a prestigious venue, as the Royal Palace of Naples, the Royal Palace of Caserta, Villa Campolieto in Herculaneum, the Belvedere Palace of San Leucio, the Pietrarsa railway museum.

In 2004 it was held at the Royal Palace of Naples a special event called The Galaxia, namely the gathering of all the courses that year celebrating ten years, or multiples of ten, from the entry to the school; special guest of the evening was the popular actor Bud Spencer, whose father, uncle, grandfather and great-grandfather were Nunziatella alumni.

The Nunziatella frequently hosts prominent personalities, who are often invited to give a keynote address at the opening of the academic year. Within the walls of the school have passed the presidents of the Italian Republic Francesco Cossiga, Carlo Azeglio Ciampi, and Giorgio Napolitano, as Nobel Prize laureates as Rita Levi-Montalcini, captains of industry as Cesare Romiti, successful writers as Pino Aprile or sportsmen as Pietro Mennea.

At the School is located the Nunziatella Alumni National Association, founded in 1950 by the lawyer Raffele Girolamo Maffettone and until 2012 the editorial office of the Neapolitan resurrected literary magazine Sud, founded by former student and writer Francesco Forlani, that hosted as contributors Roberto Saviano, Antonio Ghirelli, Tiziano Scarpa and Erri De Luca.

== Awards ==
=== Military awards ===
"And as in all human things the facts explain better than any theory from which they come, we have to say that living by the rules expertly dictated by Parisi, it came out of those walls the most beautiful flower of noble youth, which, well accustomed to all manner of doctrine, came soon after with a reputation for bravery" (Mariano d'Ayala, Napoli militare, 1847)

On 29 November 2007 to the Flag of the School was awarded the Bronze Medal of Army Valor with the following citation:

"Prestigious training institute whose values are based on the ancient roots of more than two centuries of incessant activity, constantly working with the sublime spirit of sacrifice and honor never tarnished by the succession of historical events. Forge of noble minds, it carried out an irreplaceable teaching action and example for many young people there trained, with a profound awareness of civil society, to the life and weapons. It was clear testimony illustrious alumni who, with deep love of country, honored themselves and Italy. The heritage of sacrifice and glory offered to the country by the students of the "Nunziatella", exalted by two decorated the Military Order of Italy, 38 gold medals for Valour and numerous silver and bronze medals for Valour, sealed the high educational value and the very high institutional contribution. Shining example of the spirit of service to the Country, the Military School "Nunziatella" bore out the luster enjoyed and helped to raise the prestige of the Armed Forces in joint and national level". Naples, 1787-2007"

On November 17, 2012, the Flag of the institute was awarded the Gold Cross of Merit of the Carabinieri with the following citation:

"Ancient and prestigious training institute of the Italian Army, elected guardian of military virtues, preparing for life and weapons generations of young people, educating them to the cult of duty and honor. In its centuries-long history, the Military School Nunziatella rooted the fruitful seed of the unconditional love of country and of the highest ethical values in the ranks of students placed themselves at the service of the common good in the ranks of the Carabinieri, and offered unparalleled tests unquestioned loyalty and admirable courage, witnessed by countless individual awards including five gold medals for Valour. Forge of minds and generous source of the noblest virtues, the Nunziatella is ideal reference for young minds and deserved the unanimous applause of the national community, thus helping to enhance the prestige of the Carabinieri and the armed forces. Naples, 1787-2012"

Nunziatella alumni received a total of 38 Gold Medals of Military Valour, awarded for bravery and courage between 1849 and 2010; 490 Silver Medals of Military Valour; 414 Bronze Medals of Military Valour; a gold medal of Army Valour (2001); one gold medal for Civil Valor (1998) and one medal for Civil Merit (1945).

The Italian President Francesco Cossiga has also granted in 1992 to the cadets of the Nunziatella the honor to wear the buttons of the historic uniform with the monogram RI (Italian Republic), identical to that provided on the uniforms of the officers who make up the Guard of Honor of the President. Motivation of the honor granted is contained in the words of Cossiga himself:

"The Nunziatella, in addition to being a place of military training, is a place of great cultural and civil heritage. Here, there is the history of our whole country. I believe that Italy Republican must treasure of all those who are the great military traditions and for that very reason that civilians have been formed across the country even when it had not achieved the political unity. My presence at the Nunziatella, therefore, means honoring Italy throughout what is its history." (Francesco Cossiga, 18 November 1989)

Students of the Nunziatella wear in parades the kepi of its historical uniform with the number "1" indicating them to be the first battalion of Italy. Consistent with that status, traditionally they open the annual parade of the armed forces every June 2, the Festa della Repubblica.

Those cadets of military academies, and military officers who are all alumni of Nunziatella have finally the right to attach to their uniforms a special triangular distinctive, blue, edged with red and marked "Military School Nunziatella", the center of which is reported the historical kepi uniform worn by students for activities off duty and parade.

=== Civil awards ===
The Nunziatella was awarded the following international recognition as an institution:

- "Historical and cultural heritage of the Mediterranean countries" with the following citation: "For the role played in the last three centuries in the field of higher education, such as academic, social and economic development engine for Italy and for all the Mediterranean countries linked to it".
- Mediterranean Institutions Award 2012 with the following motivation: "To have prepared 225 years, generations of the Young to "Life and Weapons", constituting an intangible heritage of humanity rooted in the history and life of the City of Naples, Italy. The Nunziatella military school is an educational excellence in the Mediterranean and in the World that places ethics and a system of values at the heart of the training of young people, destined to play a vital role in the social life of the future."

Nunziatella was donated to December 13, 2012 the Bell of Duty on the initiative of the Province of Latina: the bell was built in memory and recognition of Enrico Cosenz, alumnus and former Chief of Staff of the Army, born in Gaeta. The bell is stained with scenes of the defense of Venice, in which Cosenz participated with another former student Guglielmo Pepe and Daniele Manin; it also bears the coat of arms and the motto of the school and that of the Province of Latina.

== Coat of arms ==
The blazon of the official coat of arms is as follows:

"Fine: the first gold of the foal cheerful black; in the second of the red-skinned hand coming out of the right, holding a dagger of silver manicata gold mail post, resting on an open book to the natural; the blue band, on the partition, loaded from three cornflowers gold. The turreted crown is of gold."

A golden ribbon, under the shield of the list, bears the motto I prepare to life and weapons.

=== Symbology ===
Gold and red are the colors of the city of Naples and the hoisted black horse also refers to it. The blue band with three lilies of gold refers to the Bourbons of Naples, founders of the School. The armed wing of dagger on the open book refers to the motto of the school.

== The mottos of the Nunziatella ==
Heraldic motto is for any institution or military unit sign and figure of its identity, together with the coat of arms; the variations of the mottos of the Nunziatella also detect historical and cultural changes underwent in individual historical periods:

- 1787-1805 and 1816-1860 - Arma, viri, ferte arma: the motto, used in the Bourbon period, is based on the Aeneid of Virgil (Verg. Aen. 2, 668); from the original classic (Arma, viri, ferte arma; vocat lux ultima victos, "Weapons, men, carry weapons; the last light calls the vanquished") ruled by Aeneas after witnessing the massacre carried out Pirro in Priam's palace. Its meaning is an invitation to die there with weapons in hand.
- 1806-1815 - Multos labores, magni meritis: the motto, used in the short Murat period, apparently did not originate from any classic work, but refers to the close connection between the efforts to deal with and the merits that follow.
- 1861-1931 - Et pace et bello: the motto ("In peace and war"), used in the first post-unification period until a few years before the Second World War, is, in fact, the first expression of the vocation of the Nunziatella as forge not only officers but also of citizens; curious the similarity of the motto with the title of the epic novel War and Peace by Leo Tolstoy, but this was published only in 1865 and therefore has no connection with the motto, introduced in 1861.
- 1932-1944 - Victoriae regem dedit: the motto ("It gave the King of Victory") was granted by King Vittorio Emanuele III, a former student of the school, as a direct recognition of the role of the Nunziatella in its formation.
- 1945–present - I prepare for life and weapons: the last motto took over after World War II and the establishment of the Italian Republic, and it responds on the one hand the need to eliminate the republican institutions any reference to the monarchy; on the other recovers with other words the motto Et peace et bello, reaffirming once again the identity of the Nunziatella as training institute both military and civilian.

Next to the official, there are other two informal mottos, linked to two places in the school: the back wall of the Great Hall shows the motto "Being more than seeing", translation of the phrase Esse quam videri coming from chapter 98 of the De amicitia of Cicero; under the big clock in the school, located on the first floor landing, it is printed the motto "Il perder tempo a chi più sa più spiace" (Losing time is more regretted to whom more know), coming from the third canto of the Purgatorio of the Divine Comedy of Dante Alighieri.

Even the five sections (two in classic high school and three in scientific high school) that build the order of studies to Nunziatella have their own official mottos:

- Classic A - Über alles ("Above all"), borrowed from the opening words of the hymn Deutschlandlied in its historical significance, that the unity of the country should be the first thought of each.
- Classic B - Hic sunt leones ("Here are the lions" or "Here it is dangerous"), a phrase that was marked on maps of ancient Rome to indicate dangerous and unexplored regions of the world; the motto was introduced March 16, 1962 by the student Ernesto De Pascalis (class of 1960–63).
- Scientific A - Docet et imperat ("He teaches and commands"), transliteration of the maxim Lex imperat non docet (Law prescribes, not teaches).
- Scientific B - Sturm und Drang ("Storm and assault"), directly connected to the eponymous German cultural movement.
- Scientific C - We Are the Champions ("We are the champions"), recently acquired motto borrowed from the homonymous piece of the Queen who replaced Dante Che solo amore e luce ha per confine (That only love and light has as border) (Divine Comedy, Paradise, Chant XXVIII)

The Academy is the only remaining military unit and only school to retain a traditional drum and bugle corps (Batteria Tamburi) within the Italian Armed Forces.

== The patron saint ==
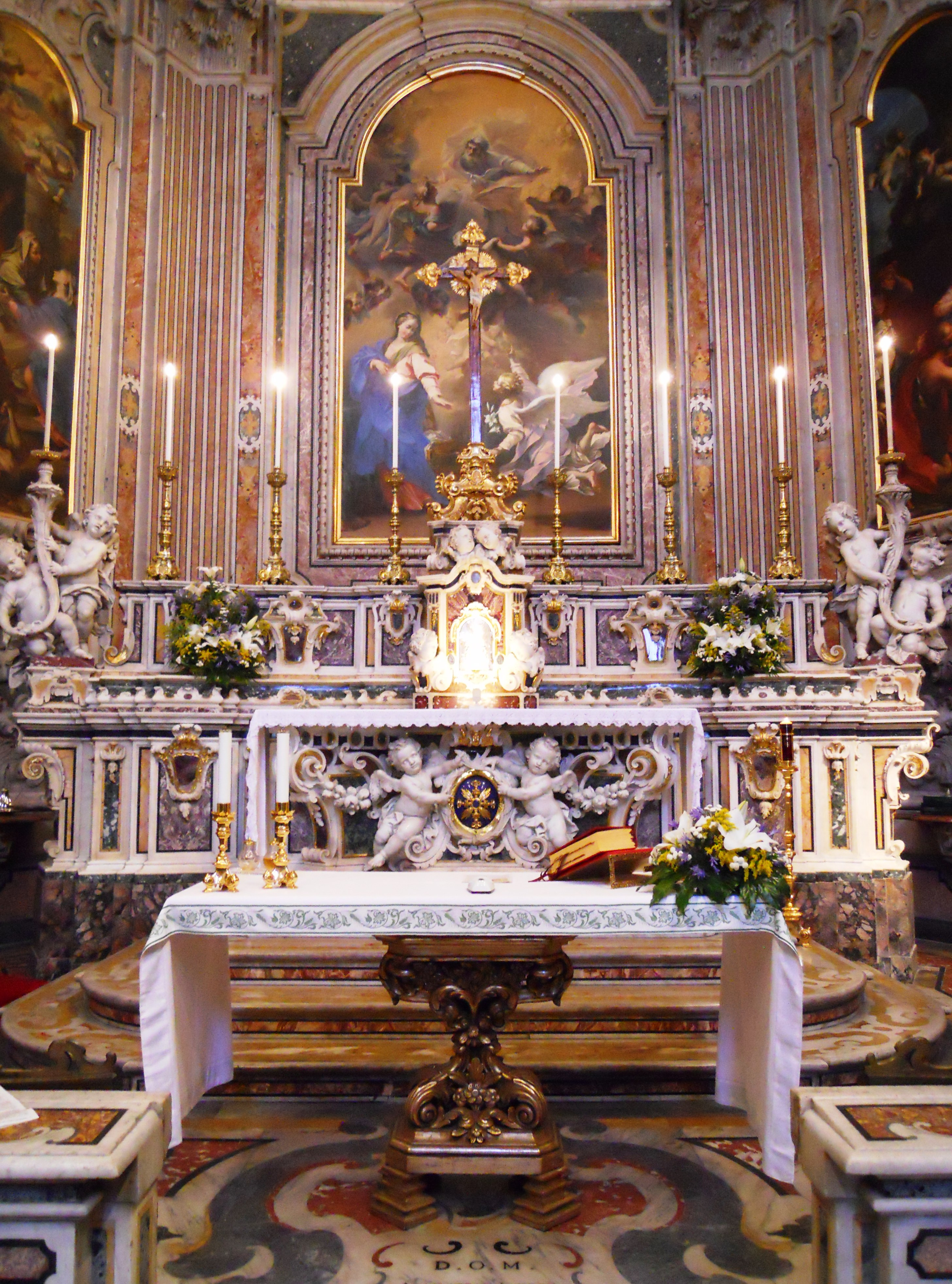
The interior of Nunziatella church. On the altar, "L'Annunciazione" by Ludovico Mazzanti

The official patron of the Military School Nunziatella is Our Lady of the Annunciation which is dedicated to the church from which the institute is named. However, in the 1960s added St. Crispin, namesake of the Jesuit monk whose ghost, according to legend, would haunt the basement of the school. The rituals associated with that internal myth are traced to a tragic event whose memory is still celebrated as part of the legacy of the institute: according to the legend, the night of St. Crispin a cadet died at the Nunziatella and in his memory the Patron saint of that day was adopted as patron of the students; the historical sources identify in the son of the general Giosué Ritucci, a cadet of the first year at Nunziatella, the unfortunate protagonist of this episode. Cadets still remember the occasion with a formal sign of respect (the first bed of the School's infirmary is never occupied) and with the celebration of a rite of remembrance on October 25.

According to another interpretation, the choice of St. Crispin has literary origins and would refer to the special feeling of brotherhood and equality, regardless of social background, which is spread among the cadets: they allude to the fact that words William Shakespeare attributes in his historical drama to Henry V of England just before the battle of Agincourt.

"And the Saints Crispin and Crispian, from this day to the end of the world will no longer pass their holiday together without them if we should remember also to us; these we happily few, of this our band of brothers: he who today sheds his blood will be on me forever my brother and, although it is of humble birth, this day I will ennoble"

== The museum complex ==
The building of the Nunziatella encompasses also three important museums, reflecting the deep historical and cultural institution.

In the Museo Duca d'Aosta is collected decorations, weapons, flags, historical relics and personal items belonging to Emanuele Filiberto di Savoia-Aosta, said the "Invictus Duke", father of former pupil Amedeo di Savoia-Aosta and a leading figure of the First World War on the Italian front. The construction of the first nucleus of the Museum was made possible thanks to the work of the former student (then the official school) Francesco Sciascia (class of 1954–59).

In the Science Museum it is conserved an extensive collection of minerals and specimens of animals and plants, as well as a significant number of old instruments, originally purchased for the physics lab by meritorious teacher and commander of School Giuseppe Saverio Poli.

On June 16, 2012, it was finally inaugurated the museum of the Nunziatella Foundation, that collects and classifies many items donated by alumni. The museum is run by Giuseppe Catenacci, historian and Honorary President of the National Association alumni Nunziatella.

== Notable alumni, teachers and commanders ==
In the more than two centuries of history the Nunziatella had among its students numerous personalities from the political, military, cultural and professional Italian and international world. In addition to those already mentioned, notable are the inventor Francesco Sponzilli, one of the pioneers of radio; economist Enrico Barone, father of the theory of marginal productivity; the designer Mario Revelli di Beaumont; historian Angelo Gatti and engineer Gennaro De Matteis, builder of the Palazzo dei Marescialli.

Numerous personalities from the cultural world have taught at the Nunziatella, contributing decisively to the development of the students. Among them are of notice Federico Zuccari, founder of Astronomical Observatory of Capodimonte; EA Mario, author of The Song of the Piave; Luigi Russo, director of the Scuola Normale Superiore of Pisa.

The Nunziatella had, at 2014, 75 commanders, including numerous alumni and personalities of the Italian civil life, including Luigi Chatrian, a member of the Constituent Assembly of the Italian Republic.

== See also ==
- List of Jesuit sites
