= Pasca (disambiguation) =

Pasca is a town in Cundinamarca department, Colombia.

Pasca may also refer to:

== People ==
- Pasca Jerono (born 1986), Kenyan-American runner
- Madame Pasca, French stage actress
- Roberto Pasca, Kingdom of the Two Sicilies brigadier
- Pașca, a surname

== Other uses ==
- Paska (bread) (called "pască" in Romanian), type of Easter bread
- Pasca (ship), English ship sailed during Francis Drake's expedition of 1572–1573
