= Nunziatella (church) =

Church of the Nunziatella
- Chiesa della Nunziatella
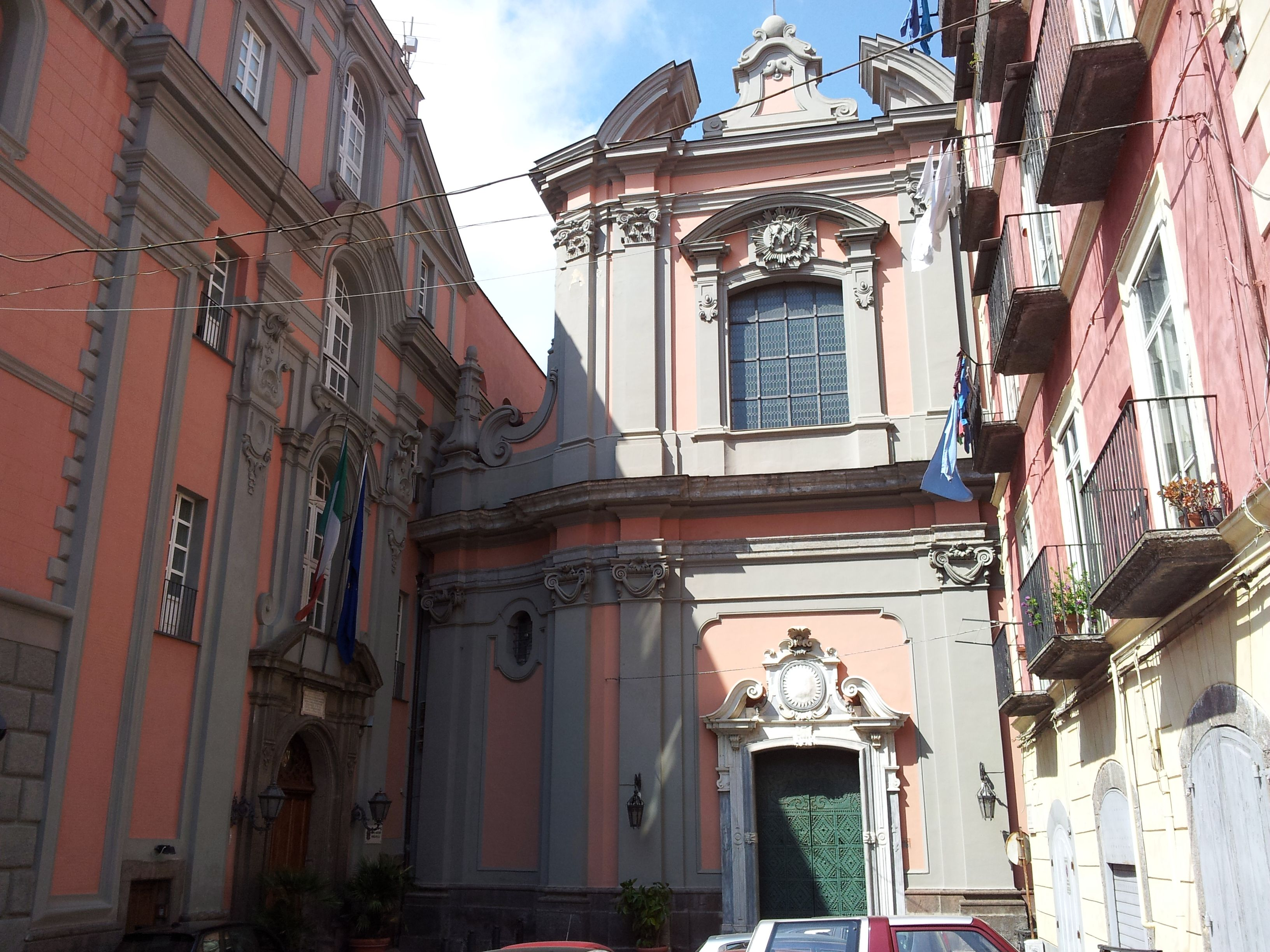
- The façade of Church of the Nunziatella.
- Church of the Nunziatella
- 40.832900°N 14.244668°E
- Location: Largo Nunziatella; Naples; Province of Naples, Campania
- Country: Italy
- Denomination: Roman Catholic

History
- Status: Active

Architecture
- Architectural type: Church
- Style: Baroque architecture
- Groundbreaking: 1588

Administration
- Diocese: Roman Catholic Archdiocese of Naples

The Church of the Nunziatella is a Baroque-style church located inside the grounds of the military school of Nunziatella, in the quartiere of San Ferdinando in Naples, Italy.

The Baroque style church was built in 1588 with the patronage of Anna Mendoza Marchesa della Valle, who donated the church to the Jesuits. In 1736, it was rebuilt wholly anew by the architect Ferdinando Sanfelice. In 1773, with the suppression of the Jesuit order, the complex was under the jurisdiction of Somaschi brothers, who established a college for sons of the Knights of Malta. The next year this became the Royal Military College and the Somaschi moved to the church of Gesù Vecchio. The church since then has become the chapel of the Nunziatella Military Institute. Originally, the church was dedicated to the Virgin of the Annunciation, but popularly the church was known as the "Annunziatella" o "Nunziatella", to distinguish it from the Basilica of Santissima Annunziata Maggiore. The name passed on to the adjacent military school.

== Interior ==
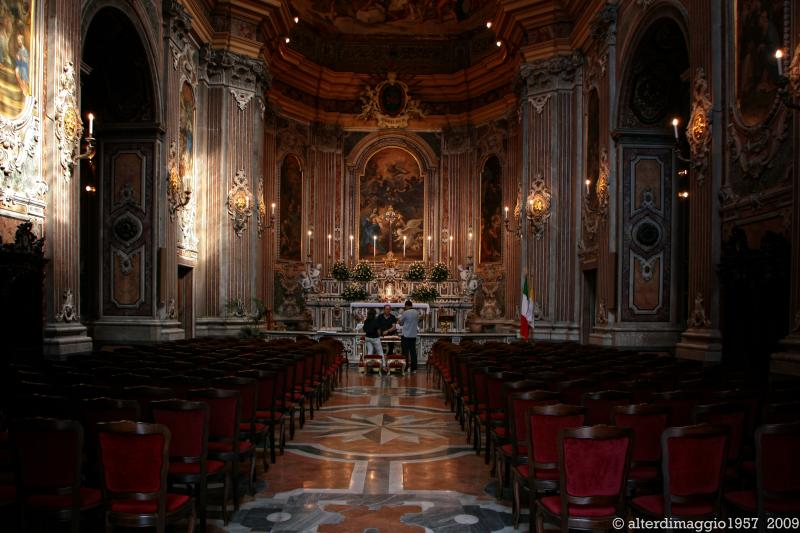
Interior

The interior of the church has a basilica plan with lateral chapels. Frescoes that depict the Adoration of the Magi in the apse and the Assumption of the Virgin in the ceiling are by are mainly by Francesco de Mura. Also in the Apse is a series of paintings depicting the Life of Mary by Ludovico Mazzanti, who also painted the four saints in the counterfacade. The main altar and balustrade in polychrome marble and bronze decoration (1756) was made by Giuseppe Sanmartino.

== See also ==
- List of Jesuit sites

== Bibliography ==
- Patrizia Di Maggio, Nunziatella, Longobardi editore, 1999.
