= Giuseppe Parisi =

Italian military leader

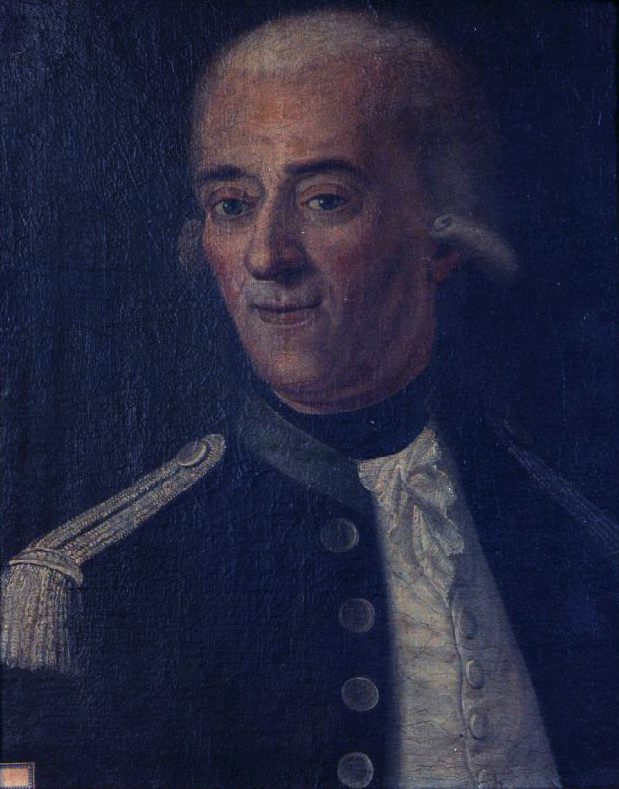
- Born: 27 March 1745; Moliterno, Basilicata
- Died: 1824 (aged 78–79)
- Known for: modernization of the military academy of the Nunziatella
- Notable work: Elementi di architettura militare (Elements of Military Architecture)
- Father: Domenico Parisi

Giuseppe Parisi (27 March 1745 – 1824) was an Italian military leader, working mainly for the Kingdom of Naples, best remembered for his modernization of the military academy of the Nunziatella.

== Biography ==
He was born to Domenico Parisi, a lawyer and small landowner in Moliterno in Basilicata. He was educated in mathematics, sciences and philosophy as a young man. He enrolled in the military and rose rapidly in ranks. He was sent to study the military of Austria and German forces, and returned after three years with an appointment of colonel, and in charge of the artillery and ordinance at the military academy. In 1786, he defined plans for a new military academy. It moved in 17887 to the former Jesuit seminary at Pizzofalcone. He began that year to publish his multivolume opus titled Elementi di architettura militare.

By 1798 he was named field marshal of the army and quarter-master general under the Austrian General Mack. He did not think the royal forces would be able to resist the French revolutionary army. With the new republican regime, he was assigned to roles a counselor of state. With the restoration of Ferdinand I as King of the Two Sicilies, Parisi lost his positions. He was briefly recruited by the King in 1820, but soon replaced by General Fardella.
