= Annibale Giordano =

Italian-French mathematician and revolutionary (1769–1835)

Annibale Giuseppe Nicolò Giordano (Ottaviano - San Giuseppe, 20 November 1769 – Troyes, 13 March 1835) was an Italian-French mathematician and revolutionary.

== Life ==
Annibale Giordano was born 20 September 1769 in Ottaviano – San Giuseppe Vesuviano, to an educated middle-class family. His father Michele was a doctor who served both the king Ferdinand I of the Two Sicilies, and the Medici princes of Ottaviano. As a teenager, Annibale Giordano attended the school of Nicolò Fergola, a brilliant mathematician from Naples. In 1789, the year of the French Revolution, he was appointed professor at the Nunziatella Military School, thus becoming a colleague of the chemist Carlo Lauberg, a freemason. In 1790, Giordano and Lauberg established an Accademia di chimica e matematica in Naples, which became a club for Neapolitan progressives and Freemasons; among the members were Mario Pagano, Emanuele De Deo, Francesco Lomonaco, Vincenzo De Filippis and Luigi de' Medici di Ottajano, then regent of the Gran Corte della Vicaria court. In 1792 Giordano and Lauberg wrote the Principi analitici delle Matematiche, in which they theorized the political commitment of mathematicians; this essay was Annibale Giordano's last scientific work.

In December 1792, Giordano was one of the scholars who met the French admiral Latouche-Tréville; starting from those meetings, a conspiracy began, sketched in the birth in August 1793 of the Società Patriottica Napoletana, a Jacobin association, but structured on the model of Masonic lodges, with a hierarchy such that some secrets were known only by high-ranking members. In February 1794, the Società Patriottica Napoletana split into two clubs. The ROMO (an acronym for Repubblica o Morte, i.e. "Republic or Death" was more radical and led by Andrea Vitaliani, among whose members were also Emanuele De Deo, Vincenzo Galiani and Vincenzo Vitaliani). The LOMO (acronym for "Libertà o Morte", i.e. "Freedom or Death"), was more moderate and willing to accept a constitutional monarchy, and was led by Rocco Lentini, and joined by Annibale Giordano).

On 21 March 1794, authorities discovered the organization through a report by a certain Donato Froncillo; in the subsequent trial, some adherents of the ROMO (De Deo, Galiani and Vincenzo Vitaliani) were sentenced to death and executed, while Giordano was sentenced to twenty years and transferred to the Forte spagnolo prison. Many sources state that Annibale Giordano told investigators the secrets of the Società Patriottica Napoletana and that he gave the names of over 250 members, including Luigi de' Medici, who was incarcerated.

Back in Naples together with the general Championnet on 5 December 1798, a few days after being released from L'Aquila, Annibale Giordano actively joined the short-lived Neapolitan Republic of 1799 as a member of the military committee and then head of the Navy's accounting service. When the Republic fell (in June 1799), he was again imprisoned by the Bourbon king in Castel Nuovo together with eighteen other revolutionaries including Mario Pagano, Domenico Cirillo and Giuseppe Leonardo Albanese. On 27 January 1800, he was sentenced to death by the junta; but the sentence was commuted to captivity on Favignana island; in July 1801, he left the island together with other political prisoners thanks to the Treaty of Lunéville. The non-execution was explained by many as a reward for Giordano's denunciation; others state that it was due to intercession by his father or Fergola at the Bourbon court. Giordano fled to France where he worked as cadastral surveyor in the French department of Aube; in 1824, he became a naturalized French citizen and changed his surname to Jourdan.

== Mathematical advancements ==
In 1786, Giordano already presented to the Royal Academy of Sciences of Naples a memoir entitled Continuazione del medesimo argomento, which opened the doors of the Academy to him. Shortly thereafter, in 1788, he became famous for solving the following problem: "Given a circle and n points of its plane, inscribe in this circle a polygon whose sides, possibly prolonged, pass, according to a certain order, through the given points"; this problem was a generalization of the "problem of Pappus", which had been already solved for the case of n=3 aligned points, and the "problem of Castillon", solved by the latter in 1776, proposed to him by Cramer, for n=3 points but still arranged in the plane. Carnot thought that "Ottajano", the birthplace of Giordano, was a noble predicate rather than a town, and he called the young mathematician "Ottajano" in his publications; after this, he began to be referred to as "Ottajano" in subsequent scientific publications.

== Works ==
- Annibale Giordano; Carlo Lauberg (1792). Principj analitici delle matematiche. Vol. 2. Naples: Gennaro Giaccio.

== Bibliography ==
- Fonseca, Giuseppe (2000). "GIORDANO, Annibale Giuseppe Nicolò". Dizionario Biografico degli Italiani (in Italian). Vol. 55: Ginammi–Giovanni da Crema. Rome: Istituto dell'Enciclopedia Italiana. ISBN 978-88-12-00032-6.
- O'Connor, John J.; Robertson, Edmund F., "Annibale Giuseppe Nicolò Giordano", MacTutor History of Mathematics Archive, University of St Andrews
