= Nicola Fergola =

Italian mathematician (1753–1824)

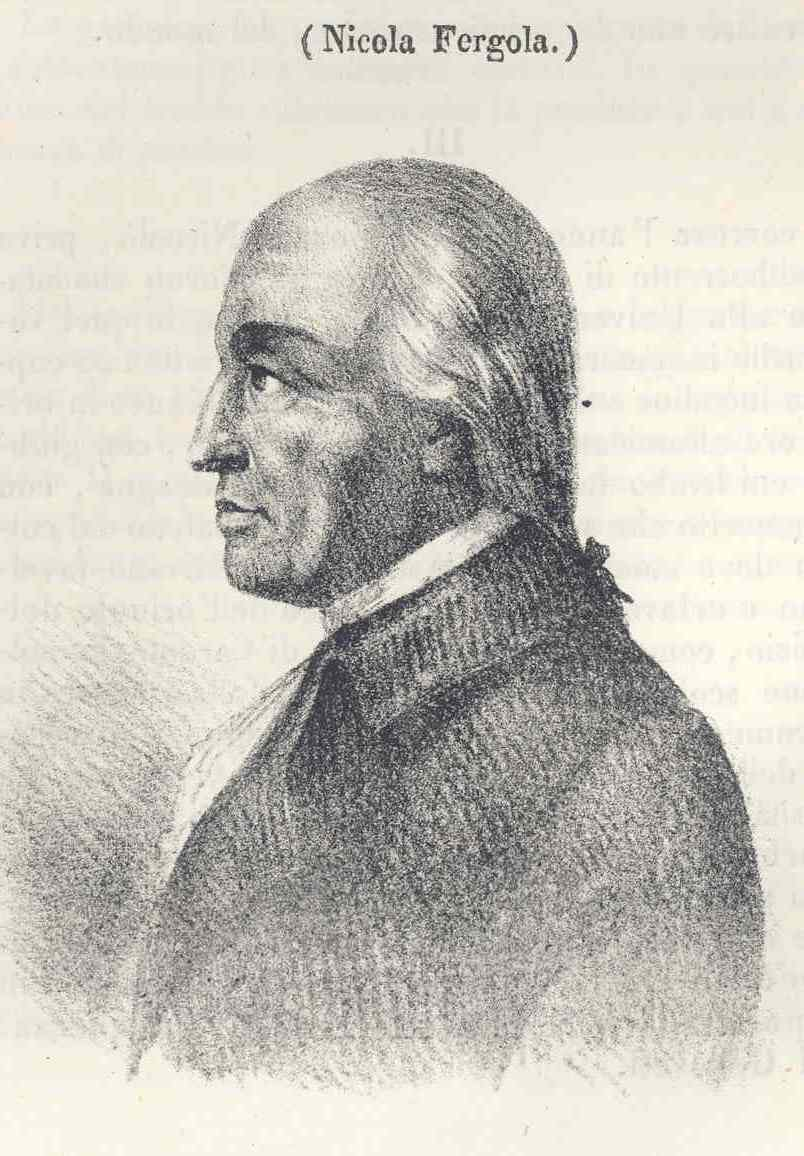
- Born: 29 October 1753; Naples, Kingdom of Naples
- Died: 21 June 1824 (aged 70); Naples, Kingdom of Two Sicilies
- Resting place: Basilica di San Paolo Maggiore (Naples); 40.85144°N 14.25683°E
- Education: University of Naples
- Scientific career
- Fields: Mathematics
- Workplaces: Liceo del Salvatore; University of Naples
- Notable students: Vincenzo Flauti; Annibale Giordano; Vincenzo Cuoco

Nicola Fergola (29 October 1753 – 21 June 1824) was an Italian mathematician. He was the founder of the synthetic school, whose teaching centred on pure geometry and the methods of classical mathematics.

== Life and work ==
Fergola studied in the Jesuit school; he then went to the university of Naples in 1767, where he studied mathematics under Giuseppe Marzucco. As concerns his philosophical education, he was deeply influenced by the mathematician Nicola Antonio De Martino (1701-1769), and by the Enlightenment philosopher Antonio Genovesi. In particular, Genovesi believed that a science consisted of established, proven, and interconnected truths, and that a scientific theory had to be presented according to the method of the ancient geometers, namely the synthetic method. From Genovesi Fergola inherited his lifelong commitment to synthetic geometry.

From 1770 Fergola was teaching, by royal appointment, in the Liceo del Salvatore, a school founded in the same building where the Jesuit school had been (the Jesuit order was suppressed three years before).

Fergola founded his own private school in Naples in 1771. This school quickly gained a high reputation and many of the brightest boys of the country were sent to study there. Fergola taught and did research in both synthetic and analytic geometry, paying special attention to the physical application of calculus. The first works on the application of integral calculus to physical problems published in Naples were by him. However Fergola showed a strong preference for the synthetic methods of classical geometry.

In 1779 Fergola was made a member of the Royal Academy of Sciences. His lectures on conic sections, published anonymously in 1791, were highly successful and adopted in colleges across the kingdom.

In 1799, during the Napoleonic period, he lived in Capodimonte but, when the Borbonic monarchy was restated, he was appointed to the mathematics chair in the university of Naples. In 1821 he suffered a stroke which left him disabled for the rest of his life. Fergola died in Naples on 21 June 1824.

== Work ==
Fergola was one of the most important mathematician of the Kingdom of Naples in the late eighteenth century. A pioneer of projective geometry, his work was highly appreciated by Michel Chasles.

Fergola was one of the protagonists of an ideological quarrel among the Neapolitan scientists at the end of 18th and the first half of the 19th century. In the field of mathematics, the quarrel was about the use of synthetic or analytic methods. These polemics were coincident with the politically conservative conceptions of the former and the progressive views of the followers of the analytic method.

Fergola and his school put particular emphasis on the need for a "pure" mathematics to be taught and practised. According to them, mathematics is "pure" when not related to material reality, but only to spiritual entities. They considered mathematics a spiritual science, a powerful resource against atheism and materialism, and insisted that it should not be contaminated with practical applications.

Fergola's close ties with the Bourbon dynasty proved fatal to his legacy. After the unification of Italy his school was accused of being a reactionary and his work was virtually forgotten. He was rediscovered at the end of the nineteenth century by Gino Loria.

Fergola wrote many treatises on mathematics and mechanics. His most important work is Prelezioni sui Principi matematici della filosofia naturale del cavalier Isacco Newton (Introduction to Mathematical Principles of the Natural Philosophy of Isaac Newton), published in two volumes in 1792 and 1793. It is interesting to see the religious point of view of the Newtonian force concept.

This religious conception is seen in all of Fergola's mathematical works. Fergola's manuscript entitled Teorica de miracoli esposta con metodo dimostrativo was published in 1839, in which Fergola tried to demonstrate the possibility of the miracles in a mathematical way: proposition, demonstration, theorem, lemma, scolium, etc.

== Selected works ==
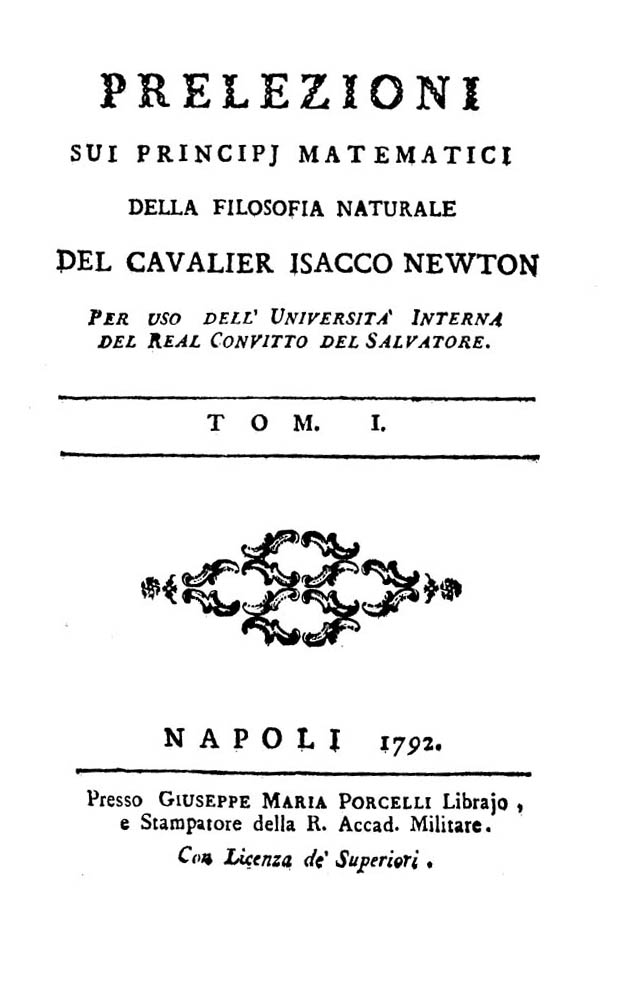
Prelezioni sui principi matematici della filosofia naturale del cavalier Isacco Newton, 1792

- Elementa physicae experimentalis usui tironum aptatae auctore Antonio Genuensi. Accedunt nonnullae dissertationes physico-mathematicae conscriptae a Nicolao Fergola (in Latin). Venetiis: apud Thomam Bettinelli. 1781.
- Prelezioni sui Principi matematici della filosofia naturale del cavaliere Isacco Newton. Napoli. 1792–93. Archived from the original on 1 April 2023.
  - Fergola, Nicola (1792). Prelezioni sui principi matematici della filosofia naturale del cavalier Isacco Newton. Vol. 1. Napoli: presso Giuseppe Maria Porcelli librajo e stampatore della R. Accad. militare.
  - Fergola, Nicola (1792). Prelezioni sui principi matematici della filosofia naturale del cavalier Isacco Newton. Vol. 2. Napoli: presso Giuseppe Maria Porcelli librajo e stampatore della R. Accad. militare.
- Trattato analitico delle sezioni coniche del signor N. F. Napoli: presso i Fratelli Chianese. 1814.
- Trattato analitico de' luoghi geometrici, di Nicola Fergola. Napoli: nella Stamperia dell'Accademia di Marina. 1818.
- Trattato analitico delle sezioni coniche e de' loro luoghi geometrici di Nicola Fergola pubblicato per la seconda volta da V. Flauti con sue note, ed aggiunte. In Napoli: nella stamperia per le opere del prof. Flauti. 1828.
- Teorica de' miracoli esposta con metodo dimostrativo seguita da un discorso apologetico sul miracolo di S. Gennaro e da una raccolta di pensieri su la filosofia e la religione. Napoli: Stamperia di V. Flauti. 1839.
- Trattato analitico delle sezioni coniche e de' loro luoghi geometrici di Nicola Fergola pubblicato per la seconda volta da V. Flauti con sue note, ed aggiunte. In Napoli: nella stamperia per le opere del prof. Flauti. 1840.
- Della invenzione geometrica opera postuma, di Nicola Fergola; ordinata, compiuta, e corredata d'importanti note dal prof. V. Flauti, aggiuntovi un esercizio di problemi geometrici risoluti con gli antichi, ed i moderni metodi, In Napoli: Nella stamperia dell'autore, 1842 (on-line).
- Istituzioni di meccanica e d'idromeccanica. Napoli: Sebeto. 1843.
- Divinazione del principio fondamentale pe' geometri antichi in risolvere i problemi di massimo e minimo: memoria tratta da' manoscritti di Nicola Fergola da Vincenzo Flauti segretario perpetuo dell'Accademia delle scienze e presentata ad essa nella I tornata del gennaio 1858. Napoli: Stamperia di A. De Pascale. 1861.

== Bibliography ==
- Ferraro, Giovanni; Palladino, Franco (1993). "Sui manoscritti di Nicolò Fergola (1753-1824)". Bollettino di Storia delle Scienze Matematiche-Unione Matematica Italiana. XIII (2): 147–197.
- Botazzini, U. (1994). "The Italian States". In Ivo Grattan-Guinness (ed.). Companion Encyclopedia of the History and Philosophy of the Mathematical Sciences. London: Routledge. pp. 1495–1504. ISBN 0-415-09238-8.
- Fazzini, Antonio (1836). "Niccolo Fergola". Poliorama Pittoresco (in Italian): 305–307.
- Mazzotti, Masimo (2002). "The Making of the Modern Engineer". In Mordechai Feingold (ed.). History of Universities: Volume XVII. Oxford University Press. pp. 121–161. ISBN 0-19-925636-5.
- Mazzotti, Masimo (1998). "The Geometers of God: Mathematics and Reaction in the Kingdom of Naples" (PDF). Isis. 89 (4): 674–701. doi:10.1086/384160. hdl:10036/31212. ISSN 0021-1753. JSTOR 236738. S2CID 143956681.
- Capobianco, Giovanni; Ferraro, Giovanni (2001). The denied memory. The fate of Fergola's school among mathematical controversies, social tensions, and political conflicts. Alessandria: Edizioni dell'Orso. ISBN 978-88-3613-148-8. ISSN 2724-0223.
- Pierce, Donna (2015). "Math, God and Politics—A Fight over Geometry in 19th Century Italy". In Thomas Price; Derek Schuurman; Kevin Vander Meulen (eds.). Proceedings of the Twentieth Conference of the Association of Christians in the Mathematical Sciences, Redeemer University College May 27-30, 2015. pp. 92–104.
- Mazzotti, Massimo (2023). Reactionary Mathematics: A Genealogy of Purity. Chicago: University of Chicago Press. ISBN 978-0-226-82674-5.
- O'Connor, John J.; Robertson, Edmund F., "Nicola Fergola", MacTutor History of Mathematics Archive, University of St Andrews
