= Vincenzo Flauti =

Italian mathematician (1782–1863)

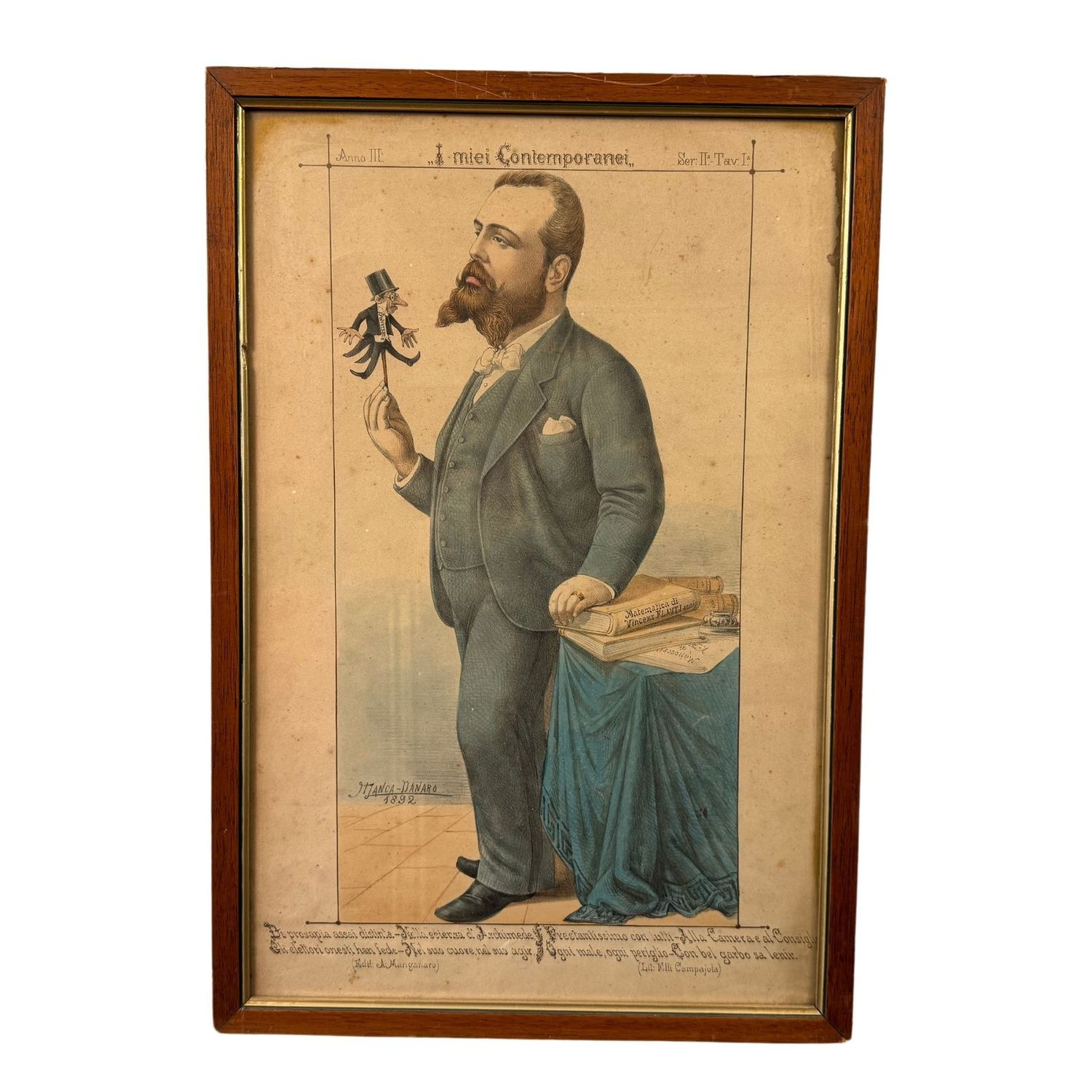
- Born: 4 April 1782; Naples, Kingdom of Naples (modern day Italy)
- Died: 20 June 1863 (aged 81); Naples, Italy
- Education: University of Naples
- Scientific career
- Fields: Mathematics
- Workplaces: University of Naples

Vincenzo Flauti (4 April 1782 – 20 June 1863) was an Italian mathematician, professor in the university of Naples.

== Life and work ==
Flauti studied at the Liceo del Salvatore, the school led by Nicola Fergola. Although he began medical studies, he changed them to mathematics influenced by his master Fergola. He taught at the University of Naples from 1803 to 1860, succeeding Fergola in his chair in 1812.

In 1860, when the Kingdom of the Two Sicilies was conquered by Giuseppe Garibaldi and was incorporated into the Kingdom of Italy, Flauti was excluded from the Academy of Sciences of Naples and from his docent duties, because he had been a supporter of the Bourbon monarchy.

Flauti was the leader of the synthetic school of mathematics founded by Fergola. In 1807, jointly with Felice Giannattasio, he was entrusted by the Bourbon government to write a mathematics textbook for all schoolchildren in the kingdom.

== Bibliography ==
- Gatto, Romano (2000). "La discussione sul metodo e la sfida di Vincenzo Flauti ai matematici del Regno di Napoli". Rendiconto dell'Accademia delle Scienze Fisiche e Matematiche. 67: 181–233.
- Ferraro, Giovanni (2008). "Manuali di geometria elementare nella Napoli preunitaria (1806–1860)" (PDF). History of Education & Children's Literature (in Italian). 3 (2): 103–139. ISSN 1971-1093.
- Ferraro, Giovanni (2012). "Excellens in arte non debet mori". HAL (in Italian): 1–16.
- Mazzotti, Massimo (1998). "The Geometers of God: Mathematics and Reaction in the Kingdom of Naples" (PDF). Isis. 89 (4): 674–701. doi:10.1086/384160. hdl:10036/31212. ISSN 0021-1753. JSTOR 236738. S2CID 143956681.
- Mazzotti, Massimo (2002). "The Making of the Modern Engineer". In Mordechai Feingold (ed.). History of Universities: Volume XVII. Oxford University Press. pp. 121–161. ISBN 978-0-19-925636-5.
