= Vincenzo Scala =

Italian painter

Vincenzo Scala (Naples, 1839 - after 1893) was an Italian painter.

Vincenzo studied at the Institute of Fine Arts of Naples. At the 1872 Milanese Mostra of Fine Arts, he exhibited a landscape: Remembrance of the Roman Countryside and another canvas, La fiera. In 1880, in Turin he exhibited; The 15th of June in Teano. In 1876, he helped decorate the walls and ceiling of the Palazzo of Baroni Zona in Naples. The large ceiling has a large allegorical composition of landscape with figures. called the Dea Aurora, or also "dalle dita rosee" seeing the sunrise effect, in which the goddess raises the light over the dusk. This ceiling painted in 1876, three years after his success in Vienna with the canvas of Piazza of Siena.
