= Pașca =

Pașca is a surname. Notable people with the surname include:

- Cosmin Pașca, Romanian canoeist
- Horațiu Pașca, Romanian handball coach
- Mirela Pașca, Romanian artistic gymnast
- Sergiu P. Pașca, Romanian-American scientist

== Double surnames ==
- Mirela Nichita-Pașca (born 1985), Romanian handball player
