= Roberto Pasca =

Naval officer of the Two Sicilies (1821–1897)

Roberto Pasca (2 April 1821, in Naples - 11 August 1897, in Naples) was a brigadier in the navy of the Kingdom of the Two Sicilies. He is most notable for signing the "Capitulation for the surrender of piazza di Gaeta" in 1861 on behalf of Francis II of the Two Sicilies.
