= Ludovico Mazzanti =

Italian painter (1686–1775)

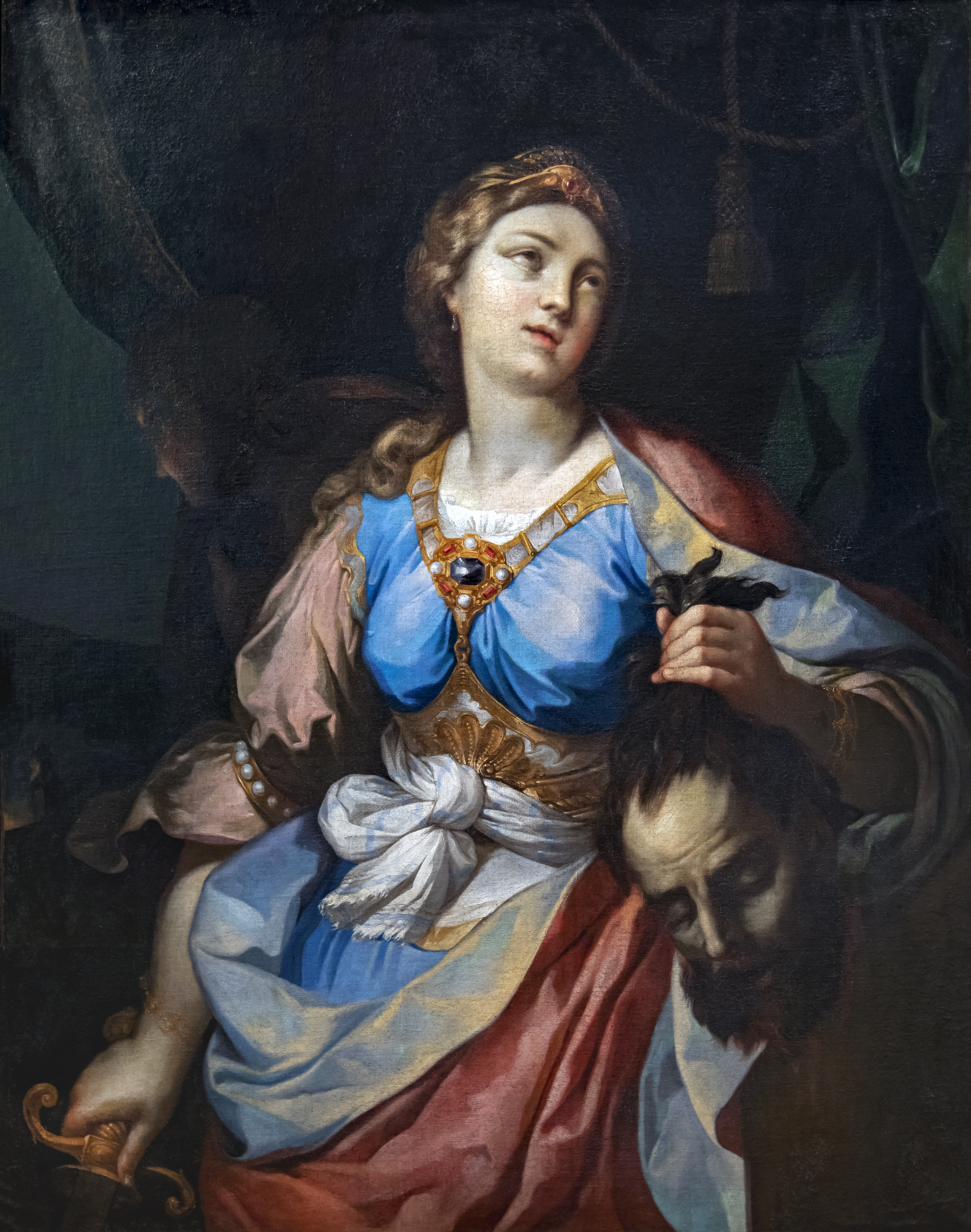
Judith and Holofernes 1740, Collection Motais de Narbonne

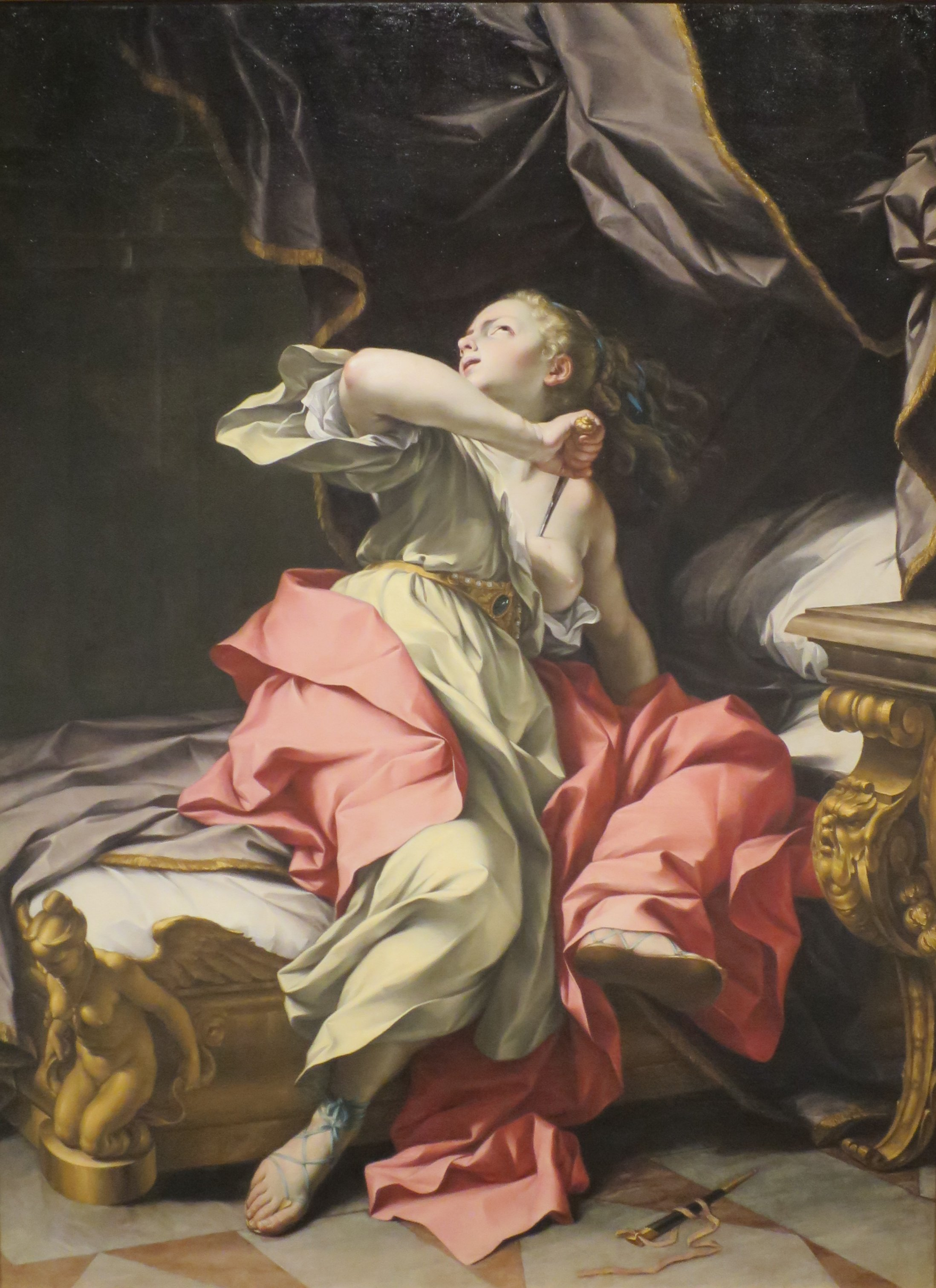
Mazzanti's The Death of Lucretia (ca. 1730), oil on canvas

Ludovico Mazzanti (5 December 1686, in Orvieto – 29 August 1775, in Viterbo) was an Italian painter. He was a follower of the school of Giovanni Battista Gaulli, known as Baciccio (died 1709).

== Biography ==
Mazzanti belonged to the Romano-Neapolitan school of artists and carried out his early work in Rome and Orvieto. In Rome, he collaborated with Nicolò Pomarancio in the church of Santa Maria Apollinare, while at Orvieto he designed the upper mosaics for the Cathedral façade (1713–1714). He executed many works at Naples, where he was based during the years 1733–1740, and in the Abbey of Montevergine in Campania.
