= Fratelli Bocca Editori =

Italian publishing house

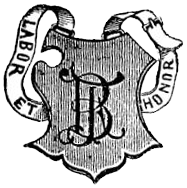
- Status: Defunct
- Founded: 1744
- Founder: Giovanni Antonio Sebastiano and Secondo Bocca
- Defunct: 1951; 75 years ago
- Country of origin: Italy
- Headquarters location: Turin
- Publication types: Books .

Fratelli Bocca Editori was an Italian publishing house. Their activity as printers in Piedmont dates back to the first decades of the 18th century. The business ceased in Milan in the 1950s.

== History ==
=== Origins ===
Antonio Secondo Bocca worked as a printer in the first half of the 18th century in Piedmont. Tancredi Faletti di Barolo: Stanze di Giuseppe Baretti Torinese al padre Serafino Bianchi da Novara printed by Antonio Secondo Bocca, documents his activity as printer of the city of Cuneo in 1744. Typographic notes starting from 1745 report: Excudebat Secundus Antonius Bocca in Torino: a spese di Domenico Maurizio Ponzone librajo vicino a S. Rocco. Other publications edited by the same printer up to 1757 are present in various libraries.

=== Giuseppe Bocca and the development of the publishing house ===
Giuseppe Bocca was born in Asti around 1790. He initially managed a bookshop in Milan, but in 1829 he sold the business to Luigi Dumolard and moved to Turin, where he took over the management of the family publishing house from his brothers Carlo and Maurizio. In the same year he became a bookseller to the then prince Charles Albert of Sardinia, a position he held even after the accession to the throne of Charles Albert and with his successors.

Giuseppe Bocca's bookshop, initially located in Piazza Castello and later in Via Carlo Alberto, became a cultural centre frequented by liberal-minded men of letters and politicians. His most successful publishing activity was instead the publication of several works by Silvio Pellico: the tragedies Gismonda da Mendrisio, Leoniero e Erodiade in 1830, My Prisons in 1832, Dei doveri degli uomini in 1834 and Poesie inedite in 1837. In 1833 he also published Federigo Sclopis di Salerano's Storia dell'antica legislazione del Piemonte.

Among the published works are: Gioachimo D'Adda: La metropolitana di Milano e dettagli rimarcabili di questo edificio Rusconi 1824; Anonymous traveler: La pittrice e il forestiere, at Giuseppe Bocca; Vincenzo Gioberti: Il rinnovamento civile degli italiani 1851.

=== The bookshops ===
The Bocca bookshop chain (Libreria Bocca) has various offices: in Milan, Turin, Florence, Rome and Paris. The sons of Giuseppe, who died in 1864, named Silvio, Casimiro and Bernado alternated in publishing and book management. Casimiro took over the management and in 1888 left the business to his son Giuseppe Bocca jr. The Milan bookshop is the oldest in Italy.

=== Fratelli Bocca Editori and librarians of the Italian King ===
Casimiro, and later his son Giuseppe jr, gave new impetus to the activity thanks to the publishing of Lombroso, De Sanctis, Schopenhauer, Wilde, etc. Fratelli Bocca Editori published between 1898 and 1958 over two thousand titles divided into different collections. Two are fundamental: the Library of Modern Sciences (Biblioteca di Scienze Moderne) and the Small Library of Modern Sciences (Piccola Biblioteca di Scienze Moderne). Out of almost six hundred and eighty titles, only three were not the first Italian editions.

=== Epilogue ===
In 1941 Fratelli Bocca Editori had its registered office in Via Durini 31 in Milan, with Carlo Torreano as its chairman, while its directors were Giuseppe Bocca and Torquato Nanni. Giuseppe Bocca jr died in 1951 in Luserna San Giovanni (Turin). In the first decades of the 20th century, the Bocca bookshops passed ownership to the L.I.R..
