= Costanza Trotti =

Italian noblewoman

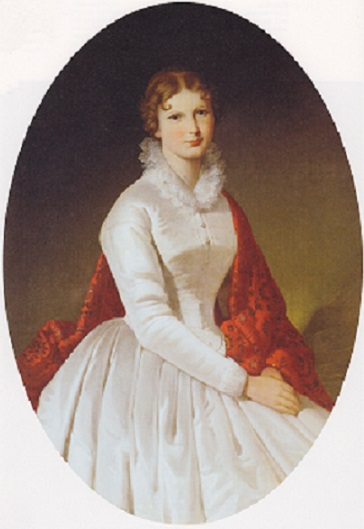
Costanza Trotti, c. 1830

Costanza Trotti Bentivoglio Arconati (21 June 1800 – 21 May 1871 in Vienna) was an Italian noblewoman and marchioness. She was married into the Visconti family. She is best known for taking part with her husband in the Carbonari revolutions in 1821, and then being exiled in Paris.
