= Antonio Capece Minutolo =

Italian nobleman, diplomat and statesman

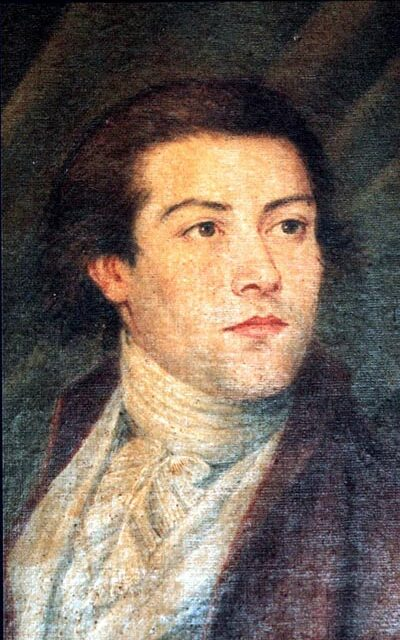

Minister of Police of Kingdom of the Two Sicilies
- In office January 1816 – 27 June 1816
- Monarch: Ferdinand I of the Two Sicilies
- Preceded by: Luigi de' Medici
- Succeeded by: Francesco Patrizi
- In office 13 April 1821 – 28 July 1821
- Monarch: Ferdinand I of the Two Sicilies
- Preceded by: Ilario de Blasio

Personal details
- Born: 5 March 1768 Naples, Campania, Kingdom of Naples
- Died: March 4, 1838 (aged 69) Pesaro, Papal States
- Party: Legitimists
- Spouses: Teresa Gabellini (m. 1791; died 1821) Anna Orselli (m. 1821; died 1836) Teresa Galluccio (m. 1836)
- Parent(s): Fabrizio Capece Minutolo and Rosalia Capece Minutolo (née di Sangro)
- Education: Collegio Nazareno
- Profession: Soldier, writer

Military service
- Rank: Captain
- Battles/wars: Napoleonic Wars

Antonio Capece Minutolo, Prince of Canosa (5 March 1768 – 4 March 1838), was an Italian nobleman, writer, diplomat and statesman, who served as Minister of Police of the Kingdom of the Two Sicilies.

== Early life and education ==
Antonio Capece Minutolo was born in Naples on 5 March 1768. He belonged to an ancient noble family that had served the kings of Naples since the 13th century. His mother, Rosalia, was the daughter of Raimondo di Sangro, Prince of Sansevero.

He studied natural philosophy and the liberal arts at the Nazarene College in Rome. Back in Naples, he frequented literary circles and devoted himself to classical studies. Deeply religious, in 1795 Canosa published a treatise on the dogma of Trinity, in which he confuted deism, arguing that any attempt to rationalize religion ends up destroying its very essence.

== Neapolitan Revolution ==
Unlike many other young nobles of his time, Canosa remained tenaciously attached to the ancien régime and defended it fervently. After the outbreak of the French Revolution, he took a staunch position in favor of traditional monarchy, and when, in early 1799, the French Army led by Jean-Étienne Championnet approached Naples, he attempted in vain to prevent the proclamation of the Parthenopean Republic.

Canosa has been described as a naive idealist, a disinterested paladin of the ancien régime. Deeply influenced by Montesquieu's works, Canosa defended the rights of aristocracy and ancient feudal institutions and considered the strong presence of intermediary bodies, in particular the feudal nobility, a guarantee against despotism. He regarded the French Revolution as the fatal result of renouncing medieval institutions and beliefs. Coherently with this vision, he criticized absolute monarchies for abusing their power and introducing new taxes and obligations without consulting the representative institution of the estates of the realm. When the royal family left the Kingdom, the feudal parliament of Naples elected him as a member of an “extraordinary deputation for good government and internal tranquility of the city”. In this capacity he refused to recognize the authority of the king's representative, Francesco Pignatelli, claiming the right of the parliament to rule the nation in the absence of the king.

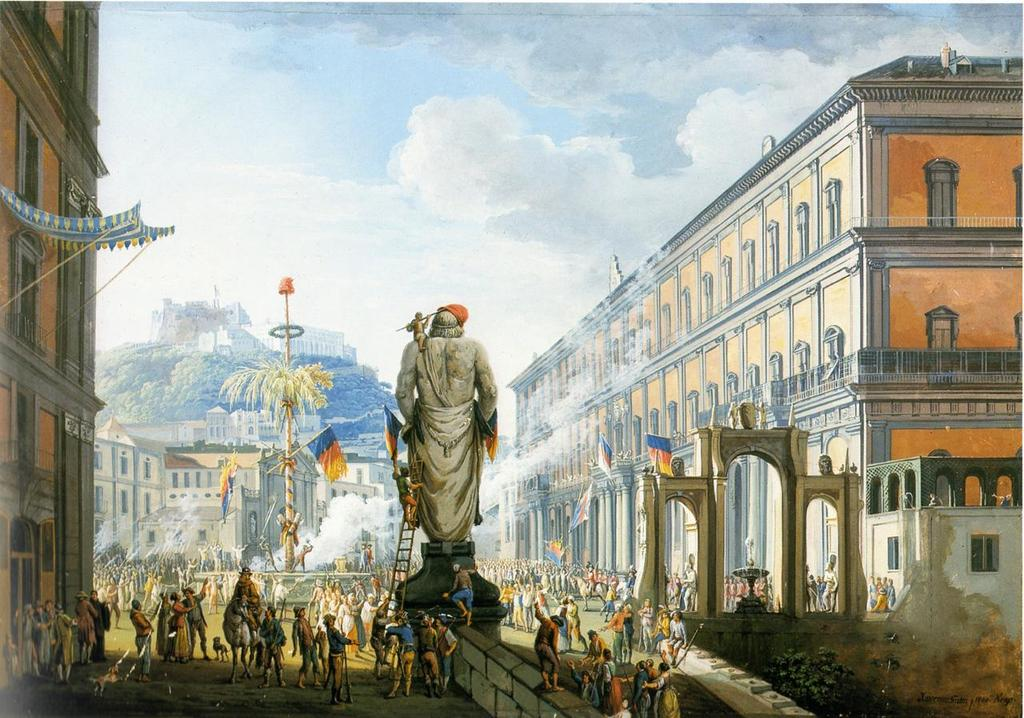
Painting of the Revolution of 1799 with blue-yellow-red tricolours

After the French occupation of Naples he was forced to hide, but a few months later he was arrested, imprisoned in Castel Sant'Elmo and sentenced to death for royalist conspiracy. However, the republic fell before the execution could be carried out, and Canosa was freed from prison by the Sanfedisti only to be sentenced to five years in prison for defending the rights of aristocracy against the king. He was amnestied after the Treaty of Florence (1801).

== Exile ==
In 1806, the French returned to Naples. While the prince's father, Fabrizio, joined the new regime, the young Canosa followed the court to Sicily, from where he coordinated a secret legitimist network. On 28 February 1807, queen Maria Carolina dispatched him to the island of Ponza to try and raise a rebellion in Naples. From Ponza Canosa worked a vast network of secret correspondence, that stretched from Naples all over the kingdom. In 1808, he engaged in a conspiracy to kill Antoine Christophe Saliceti, who served Joseph Bonaparte and Joachim Murat as Minister of Police in the Napoleonic kingdom of Naples between 1806 and 1809. A bomb was placed in his palace and Saliceti narrowly escaped being killed. Several of Canosa's friends were summarily tried and executed in consequence and a bounty was put on his head by the new king. Saliceti allegedly tried to have Canosa poisoned. In 1814 Ferdinand IV sent Canosa on a diplomatic mission to the newly restored Spanish King Ferdinand VII. The mission was successful: Ferdinand VII decidedly supported the restoration of Ferdinand IV on the throne of Naples. The king of Spain was favourably impressed by the young nobleman and awarded him the Great Cross of the Immaculate Conception. At the time of Murat's expedition to Pizzo in 1815, Canosa was sent on a special mission to Calabria with orders to put Murat immediately to death; he was, however, recalled on the receipt of the news that Murat had been captured and executed.

== Bourbon Restoration ==
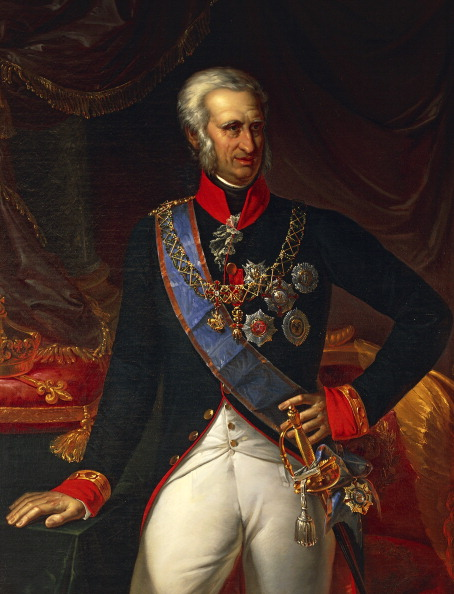
Ferdinand I of the Two Sicilies

After the second restoration of the Bourbon dynasty (1816), Canosa was appointed Minister of Police. Canosa was determined to root out any revolutionary threat by purging the justice system, the army, the civil service and the educational system of all those who had compromised themselves with Murat's government. He endeavoured to unleash a massive repression against the Carbonari and Freemasons, and proposed to arm and support the Calderari, a secret society formed early in the century in opposition to the Carbonari. However, his extreme political views made him highly suspect to Metternich who insisted on his removal from Naples.

In June 1816, Canosa was forced to resign and banished from the kingdom by his rival Luigi de' Medici, while some of his followers were arrested and tried. He regained the office in 1821, but was quickly dismissed at Metternich's insistence, and the king urged him to leave the country. Canosa thenceforth devoted himself to the fight in defense of the kings and against atheism and subversion. He wrote several pamphlets, books and articles against liberalism and collaborated with politically explicit and combative newspapers, such as La Voce della Verità (The Voice of Truth).

For his reactionary ideas, he was expelled from Tuscany (1830), and he settled in the Duchy of Modena, where the reigning Duke, Francis IV, appointed him his advisor. He began a propaganda campaign in favor of legitimism and against liberalism and established royalist militias, the Battalions of Volontari Estensi, tasked with “maintaining order in the countryside by seconding the active troops in case of need”. In 1835 he moved to the Papal States, where he was employed by Cardinal Tommaso Bernetti to form another counter-revolutionary militia known as the Centurioni. Canosa died in Pesaro on 4 March 1838.

== Works ==
- Aliqui ex Luciani Samosatensis operibus Dialogi morales ab Antonio Capycio Minutolo ex principibus Canusii latine et italice redditi, et Excellentissimae Dominae Teresiae Revertera dicati (PDF). Neapoli: Typis Onuphrii Zambraja. 1794.
- La Trinità orazione dogmatico-filologica. Naples: presso Onofrio Zambraja. 1795.
- L'utilità della monarchia nello stato civile, orazione diretta contro i novatori del secolo. Naples: per Onofrio Zambraja. 1796.
- Minutolo, Antonio Capece (1799). Memoria dilucidativa di vari articoli da aversi in considerazione nella abolizione da farsi dei feudi e della feudalità. Naples.
- La passione e morte del Divino nostro Redentore predetta dai profeti confermata dai prodigj e dalle testimonianze degli eterodossi scrittori. Naples: presso Vincenzo Orsino. 1802.
- Minutolo, Antonio Capece (1802). La natività del Divino Nostro Redentore, dimostrata con le autorità degli etnici filosofi. Naples.
- I Napoletani compromessi hanno un diritto perfetto ad essere sussidiati nel Regno di Sicilia. Palermo: dalla tipografia Reale di Guerra. 1813.
- Copia di una lettera che un amico da Vienna scrisse ad un altro in Napoli, s.l. 1815.
- Seconda lettera che un amico da Vienna scrive ad un altro in Napoli, s.l. 1815.
- I Piffari di montagna ossia cenno estemporaneo di un cittadino imparziale sulla congiura del principe di Canosa e sopra i Carbonari. Epistola critica diretta all'estensore del Foglio letterario di Londra. Lucca. 1820. Written under the pseudonym of Giuseppe Torelli.
- Analisi sopra un articolo della Minerva Napolitana, epistola dell'autore dei Piffari di montagna ad un suo amico. Dublino. 1821.
- Confutazione degli errori storici e politici da Luigi Angeloni esposti contro Sua Maestà la defunta regina Maria Carolina di Napoli. Epistola di un amico della verità ad uno storico italiano rispettabilissimo. Marsiglia. 1830.
- Sulla proporzione delle pene secondo la diversità de' tempi. Modena: nella tipografia Camerale. 1831.
- I miracoli della paura. Modena: nella tipografia Camerale. 1831.
- I piccoli pifferi, ossia risposta che alla sovrana liberalesca Canaglia dà l'antico autore de' Piffari di montagna in difesa del suo calunniato cliente principe di Canosa. Paris. 1832.
- Un dottore in filosofia e un uomo di Stato, dialogo del principe di Canosa sulla politica amalgamatrice, s.l. 1832.
- Sulla corruzione del secolo circa la mutazione dei vocaboli e delle idee, Italia 1833.
- Minutolo, Antonio Capece (1833). L'Enciclica del 15 ag. 1832 e il giansenismo del secolo XIX. Epistola polemica. Italia.
- Lettera ad Amarante, Roma 1834.
- Minutolo, Antonio Capece (1834). Epistola, ovvero, Riflessioni critiche sulla moderna storia del reame di Napoli del generale Pietro Colletta. Capolago.
- Antonio Capece Minutolo (2021–2024). Gianandrea de Antonellis (ed.). Saggi politici. 4 vols. Chieti: Solfanelli.

== Bibliography ==
- Croce, Benedetto (1927). "Il principe di Canosa". Uomini e cose della vecchia Italia. Vol. II. Bari: Laterza. pp. 225–53.
- Bertoni, Giulio (1927). "Il principe di Canosa nel ducato Estense". La Cultura. VI: 100–8.
- Petrini, Domenico (1928). "Tra i legittimisti dell'800 negli ultimi anni del principe di Canosa". Nuova Rivista Storica. XII: 513–53.
- Paladino, Giuseppe (1930). "CANOSA, Antonio Capece Minutolo, principe di". Enciclopedia Italiana. Istituto dell'Enciclopedia Italiana.
- Maturi, Walter (1944). Il principe di Canosa. Florence: Le Monnier.
- Villani, Pasquale (1968). "Il dibattito sulla feudalità nel Regno di Napoli dal Genovesi al Canosa". Saggi e ricerche sul Settecento. Naples: Istituto Italiano per gli Studi Storici. pp. 252–331.
- Leoni, Francesco (1971). "El pensamiento reaccionario en la historia de Italia" (PDF). Revista de estudios políticos. 175: 59–76. ISSN 0048-7694.
- Godechot, Jacques (1976). "Saliceti ministre du royaume de Naples sous Joseph Bonaparte et Murat". Studi in memoria di Nino Cortese. Rome: Istituto per la storia del Risorgimento italiano. pp. 255–272.
- Postigliola, Alberto (1975). "CAPECE MINUTOLO, Antonio, principe di Canosa". Dizionario Biografico degli Italiani (in Italian). Vol. 18: Canella–Cappello. Rome: Istituto dell'Enciclopedia Italiana. ISBN 978-88-12-00032-6.
- Del Corno, Nicola (2004). "'Un dispotismo vigoroso ed estremamente attivo'. La Restaurazione secondo il Principe di Canosa". In Marco Ferrari (ed.). Dinamiche del potere e dell'ideologia nell'Europa contemporanea. Florence: CET. pp. 85–110.
- Davis, John A. (2006). "The Restoration". Naples and Napoleon: Southern Italy and the European Revolutions, 1780-1860. Oxford: Oxford University Press. pp. 275–294. doi:10.1093/acprof:oso/9780198207559.003.0015. ISBN 978-0-19-820755-9.
- Capodieci, Salvatore (2008). "Il principe di Canosa in Emilia e nelle Romagne". Il Lettore di Provincia. 130 (130): 111–127. doi:10.1400/92703.
- Di Giovine, Francesco Maurizio (2015). "Il Principe di Canosa nella bufera della Restaurazione". Aportes. XXX (87): 47–79. ISSN 0213-5868.
- Del Corno, Nicola (2021). "Una polemica controrivoluzionaria in Italia. Le sette segrete nelle riflessioni del Principe di Canosa". Signos Históricos. XXIII (46): 88–119. ISSN 1665-4420.
- Mazzotti, Massimo (2023). Reactionary Mathematics: A Genealogy of Purity. Chicago: University of Chicago Press. ISBN 978-0-226-82674-5.
