= Calculated Risk =

Calculated Risk may refer to:

- Calculated Risk (blog), a finance and economics blog
- Calculated Risk (film), a 1963 British crime thriller film
- Calculated Risk (novel), a 1960 science fiction novel by Charles Eric Maine
- A Calculated Risk, a 1992 financial thriller novel by Katherine Neville

== See also ==
- Risk (disambiguation)
- Risk appetite
- Risk assessment
- Risk management
