= Piero Maroncelli =

Italian patriot, musician and writer

Pietro Maroncelli
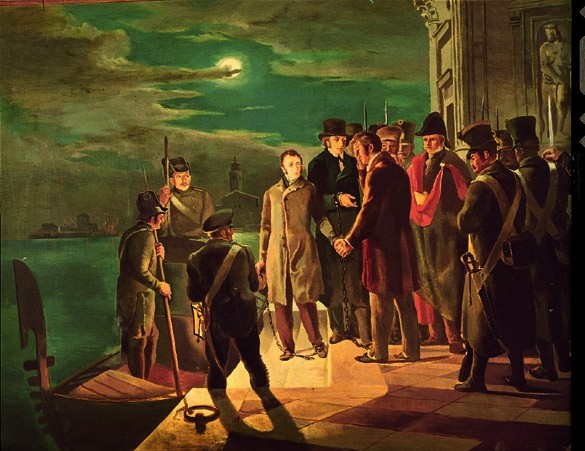
- Silvio Pellico and Piero Maroncelli, after the sentence, begin their journey from Venice to the Spielberg fortress (Carlo Felice Biscarra, Museo civico di Saluzzo)
- Born: Pietro Maroncelli; 21 September 1795; Forlì, Papal States
- Died: 1 August 1846 (aged 50); New York City, United States
- Other name: Piero Maroncelli
- Occupations: Patriot, musician, writer
- Known for: Member of the Carbonari; imprisoned at Špilberk Castle with Silvio Pellico

Pietro Maroncelli (21 September 1795 – 1 August 1846), also known as Piero Maroncelli, was an Italian patriot, musician and writer associated with the Carbonari and the early phases of the Italian unification during the Risorgimento, noted for his imprisonment at Špilberk Castle alongside Silvio Pellico.

== Biography ==
Portrait of Silvio Pellico

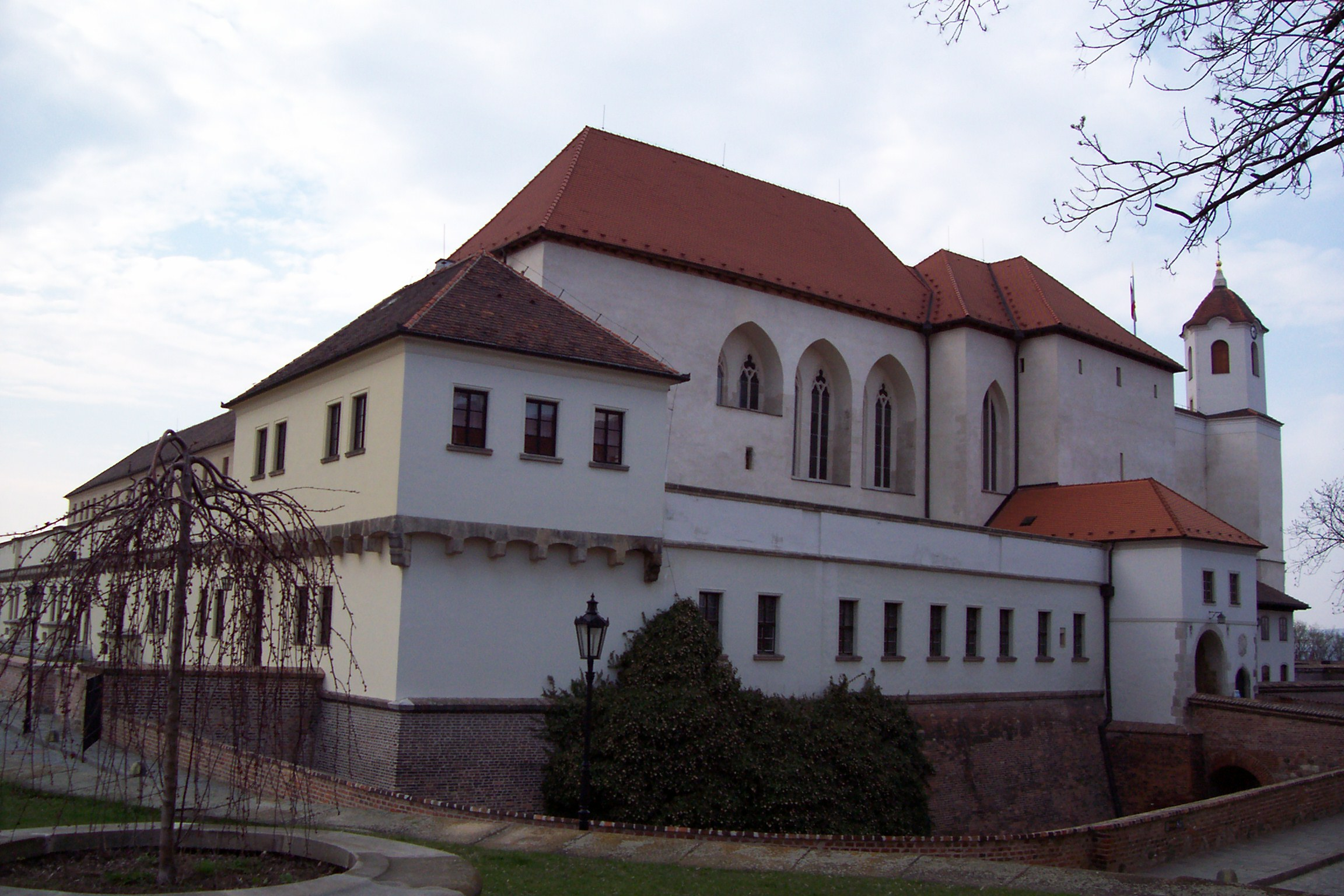
The Špilberk Castle

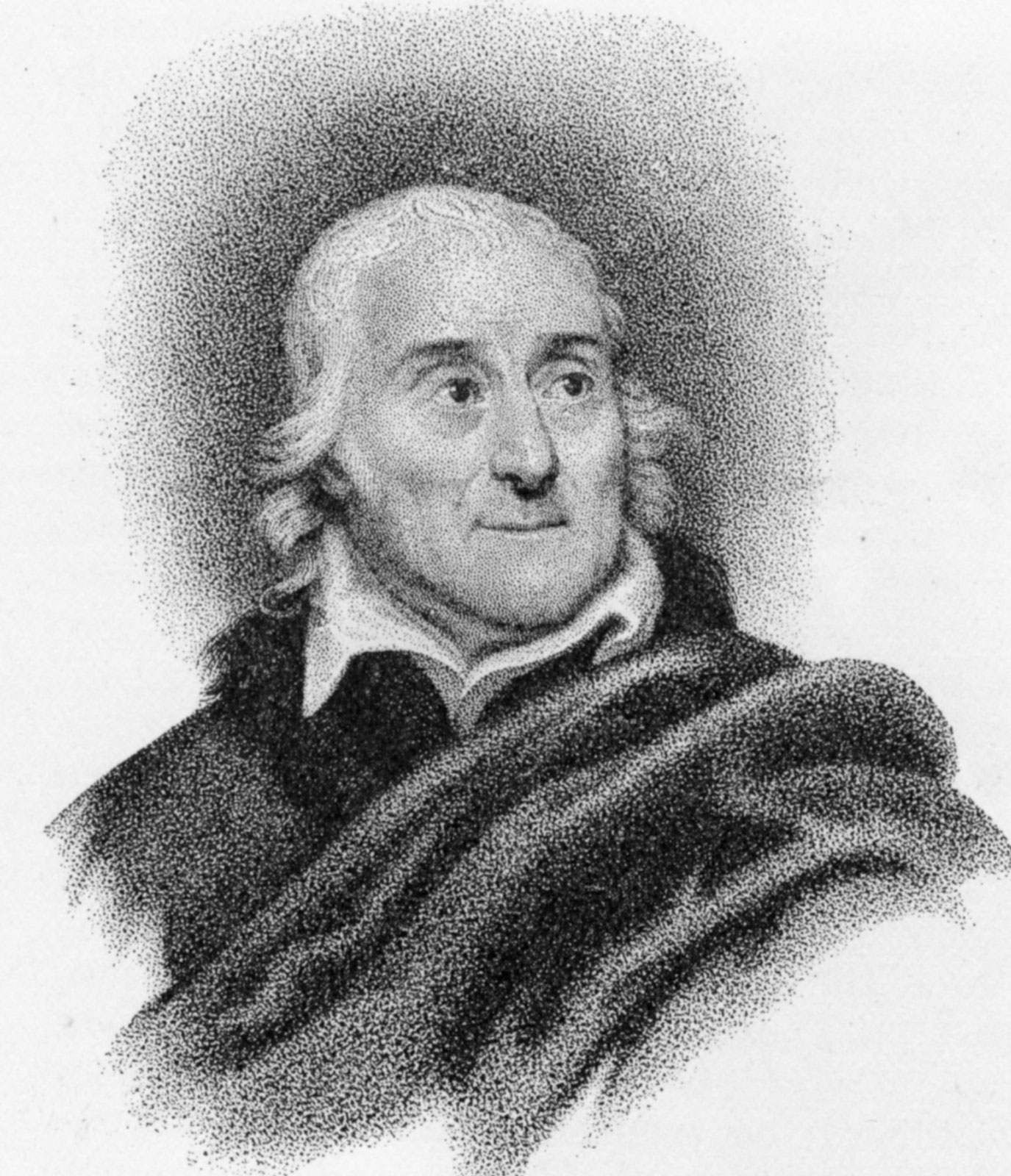
Portrait of Lorenzo Da Ponte

Pietro was born in Forlì to Antonio, a broker, and Maria Iraldi.

Little is known about his childhood and youth. The family was “respectable” but of very modest economic conditions: the father's work, often hindered by illness, was not enough to support the household; the mother and the sisters supplemented the family income by working as embroiderers and renting rooms to lodgers. Despite this, the education of the children – both male and female – was given the highest priority.

After completing classical studies at the Gymnasium of Forlì, where he developed a strong passion for literature, and showing a marked inclination for music, in late 1809 he moved to Naples to attend the prestigious Royal College of San Sebastiano, thanks to a scholarship funded by the Charity Institute of Forlì. Among his teachers were Giovanni Paisiello, Girolamo Crescentini and Nicola Antonio Zingarelli, and among his fellow students Saverio Mercadante, Nicola Antonio Manfroce, Vincenzo Bellini and Luigi Lablache.

As he declared to the Austrian police during the interrogation of 7 October 1820, he spent three years at the institute. During this period he was introduced by the college administration into the Masonic lodge “Colonna Armonica”, with the task of composing music to be performed during the events of the secret society.

After leaving the college in 1813, he remained in Naples for two more years to continue his musical studies. In April 1815, while Joachim Murat’s campaign in northern Italy was failing, he was appointed “internal security guard” and, through a captain of that corps, joined the Carbonari together with his brother Francesco. After less than a month, the return of the Bourbons forced the society into clandestinity.

His Neapolitan period was decisive for his formation: besides consolidating his musical studies, he gained direct experience with Freemasonry and the Carbonari; of the latter he appreciated their role within the armed forces as an element of solidarity and brotherhood.

He returned to Forlì and went to Bologna to perfect his composition studies. There he met the musician and poet Cornelia Martinetti, hostile to the Austrian Empire and welcoming to patriots, whom he frequented for about two years; during this period Maroncelli was also in correspondence with Sante Agelli.

Called back to Forlì by his father, Maroncelli wrote the text and melody of a sacred hymn, the Inno a san Giacomo, which was denounced for “rebellion and impiety”, not so much for its words but because the police suspected Maroncelli of being a Carbonaro. He was imprisoned in the fortress of Forlì in 1819 and then transferred to Rome to Castel Sant'Angelo. In this first period of imprisonment, still strong in spirit, he allowed himself to be tormented without revealing the names of his accomplices and without retracting his liberal principles.

Released after a few months “through the intercession of a cardinal and Teresa Chiaramonti, niece of Pope Pius VII and wife of the Forlì count Antonio Gaddi”, he stayed in Pavia with his brother Francesco, also a physician and patriot; later he moved to Milan, where he supported himself by giving music lessons and working for the musical publisher Ricordi. He wrote a biography of Arcangelo Corelli; from November 1819 to March 1820 he worked first as a translator for the publisher Niccolò Bettoni and then as a proofreader for the printing of Antonio Marchisio's works at the Battelli press.

When the Neapolitan revolution broke out, exciting Italians everywhere, Maroncelli contacted the most influential Lombard liberals to promote the creation of a federation of all Italian states. Maroncelli met Silvio Pellico at the Marchionni household, where their friendship began. Pellico was persuaded by his friend to join the Carbonari; therefore, when Maroncelli was arrested on 6 October 1820, Pellico was compromised as well, because Maroncelli had carelessly kept incriminating papers. Many others were discovered with them, but Pellico bore no resentment toward his companion, not even for the revelations he made during long interrogations first in Milan and then in Venice, where the two were transferred and interrogated by magistrate Antonio Salvotti.

With the sentence delivered on 21 February 1822, pronounced publicly on a scaffold in the small square of Piazza San Marco facing the Doge's Palace, Maroncelli was condemned to death. The emperor commuted the sentence to twenty years of hard imprisonment for him and fifteen for Pellico, to be served in the Špilberk Castle in Moravia, where they arrived on 10 April of the same year. After a severe illness, Pellico obtained permission in 1823 to be reunited with Maroncelli, who had been diagnosed with a tumor in his left knee that left no alternative but amputation.

Other illnesses struck him in the damp cell until pardon arrived for both men on 1 August 1830, after ten years of harsh imprisonment. In Mantua he was separated from Pellico and taken back to Forlì. But in the Papal States, for a liberal condemned by Austria, the climate was hostile, and after a few weeks he was ordered to leave his family and his homeland. He therefore took refuge in France. In exile, his hopes for Italian independence were rekindled when he learned of the uprisings in the Romagna, the Austrian threats of intervention, and the French occupation of Ancona.

He decided to move to America after three years in Paris. There he had published the Additions to "My Prisons" and had married the singer Amalia Schneider. In 1833 he embarked for the United States with the opera company of Don Vincenzo Riva Finoli. He lived precariously in New York, giving lessons in music and Italian. In the American city he befriended Lorenzo Da Ponte, librettist, poet and playwright of Venetian origin.

He died at the age of fifty in New York, according to Felice Foresti, after suffering until the end from the never-healed wound caused by the amputation and from mental disorders that gravely undermined his intellectual faculties.

After being initially buried at Greenwood Cemetery in Brooklyn, in 1886 his remains were brought back to Forlì and, after solemn celebrations, the patriot was interred in the Pantheon of the city's monumental cemetery. A bust by sculptor Ettore Ferrari commemorates him there.

== In popular culture ==
The circumstances of Maroncelli's death are referenced in the song La domenica delle salme by Italian singer-songwriter Fabrizio De André, who compared the fate of the Carbonaro to that of Renato Curcio, founder of the Red Brigades.

Messengers, foot soldiers, horses, dogs and a donkey were sent to announce the amputation of Renato Curcio’s leg, the Carbonaro.

— La domenica delle salme, Fabrizio De André

The reference to Curcio is precise. I simply said that it was unclear why people with multiple murders on their backs were walking freely through our streets and squares — including Piazza Fontana — and why Mr. Renato Curcio, who never killed anyone, had been in prison for many years and no one cared to get him out. I would say only because he had not repented, had not dissociated himself, had not taken advantage of that new law which certainly does not belong to my moral world... The reference to the amputation of the leg was also meant as a reminder of the health conditions in our prisons.

— Fabrizio De André
