= My Prisons =

1832 memoir by Silvio Pellico

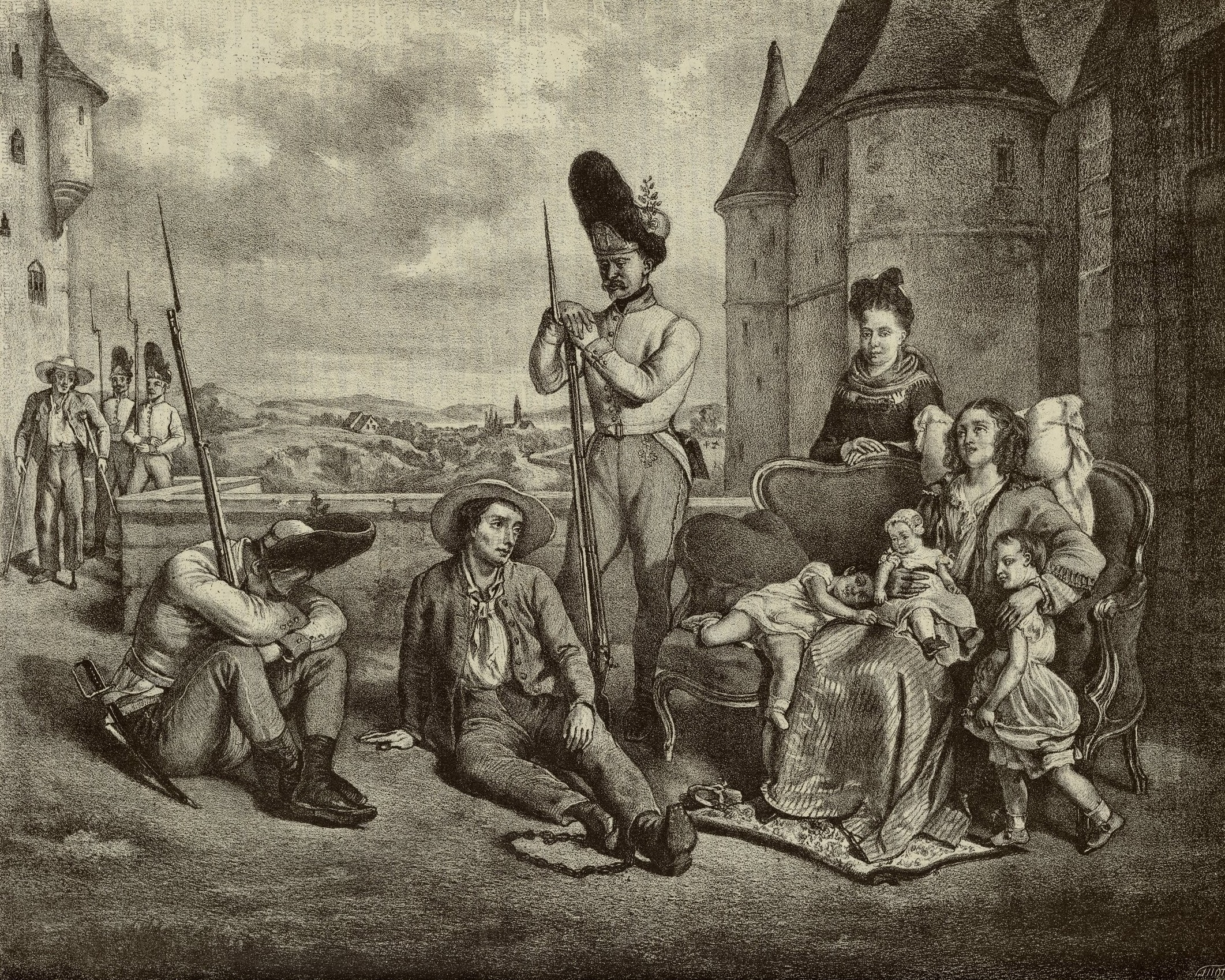
- Silvio Pellico in chains between two Austrian soldiers, lithography by Émile Louis Vernier after a painting by Octavie Rossignon
- Author: Silvio Pellico
- Original title: Le mie prigioni
- Translator: Thomas Roscoe
- Language: Italian
- Genre: Memoir
- Publication date: 1832
- English publication date: 1833
- Text: My Prisons at Wikisource

My Prisons (Italian: Le mie prigioni) is a memoir by the Italian author Silvio Pellico, published in 1832. The work describes the events following Pellico's arrest as a member of the Carbonari, his initial detention in Venice and his subsequent imprisonment in the Špilberk Castle near Brno. Central themes include the harsh experience of incarceration, permeated by loneliness and suffering, and the spirit of Christian resignation that runs throughout the text.

== Background ==
The narrative covers the period from 13 October 1820, when Pellico, aged 31 and already a well-known playwright, was arrested in Milan for his involvement in the failed Revolution of 1820, to 17 September 1830, the day of his release. Pellico recounts his experiences as a political prisoner, first in Venice in the infamousous Venetian Piombi, also known as the 'Leads' or 'Lead Chambers', where he awaited execution after being initially sentenced to death. Subsequently, following the commutation of his death sentence to fifteen years of harsh confinement, he was held at the fortress of Špilberk near Brno in Moravia (present-day Czech Republic), alongside his friend and fellow activist Piero Maroncelli.

Although hailing from a deeply religious family, Pellico had distanced himself from Catholicism in his youth. This shift primarily occurred during his time in Lyon, where he was exposed to Jacobin ideas, Enlightenment philosophy and radical political views. Following his arrest, intense physical and mental suffering, combined with the influence of devout fellow inmate Antonio Oroboni, triggered a dramatic spiritual awakening. Pellico wrote his prison memoirs to demonstrate how much comfort religion can provide in times of adversity through his own example.

== Release and publication ==
In 1830, Silvio Pellico, then aged 41, was granted a pardon after many years of isolation, and was released from the Špilberk Castle. However, the severe physical and psychological trauma he had experienced led him to live an isolated life until his death in 1854. He refrained from all political activity and devoted himself to writing. Encouraged by his confessor, Pellico began writing his memoirs in 1831 at his family home in Turin. After resolving issues arising from Piedmontese censorship, he published the memoirs in Turin in 1832. In 1843, additional chapters (written in 1832) appeared in a French translation. These were part of a larger autobiographical work which the author never completed, covering the period immediately following his release.

== Legacy ==
By providing a realistic account of the harsh conditions of Austrian imprisonment, such as brutal forced labour, legcuffs, meagre rations and unsanitary cells, as well as the nature of the Habsburg regime, the book served the Italian national cause and intensified hatred towards foreign rule. The work achieved great success among the author's contemporaries and was translated in several different languages. It fostered sympathy for the nascent Italian unification movement among European intellectual circles and in the salons of the time. Pellico's My Prisons "forced on world opinion the image of the Austrian as the jailer and executioner of Italy", and according to Austrian Prime Minister Klemens von Metternich, its impact on Austria's image was worse than a defeat on the battlefield.

== English editions ==
- Pellico, Silvio (1833). My Ten Years' Imprisonment. Translated by Thomas Roscoe. New York: J. & J. Harper.
- Pellico, Silvio (1836). My Prisons. Cambridge: C. Folsom.
- Pellico, Silvio (1839). The imprisonments of Silvio Pellico. Edinburgh: William and Robert Chambers.
- Pellico, Silvio (1889). My Prisons: Memoirs of Silvio Pellico. Introduction by Epes Sargent. Boston: Roberts Brothers.
- Pellico, Silvio (1963). My Prisons. Le mie prigioni. Translated by Isaias Gerard Capaldi. London: Oxford University Press.

== Bibliography ==
- Ford, Jeremiah Denis Mathias (1913). "Silvio Pellico" . In Herbermann, Charles (ed.). Catholic Encyclopedia. New York: Robert Appleton Company.
- Sauvigny, Guillaume de Bertier de (1962). Metternich and His Times. Translated by Peter Ryde. London: Darton, Longman & Todd.
- Ciferri, Elvio (2004). "Pellico, Silvio 1789–1854". In Christopher John Murray (ed.). Encyclopedia of the Romantic Era, 1760-1850. Vol. 2. New York: Taylor & Francis. pp. 859–861.
- Shapiro, Gavriel (2010). "Nabokov and Pellico: Invitation to a Beheading and My Prisons". Comparative Literature. 62 (1): 55–67. JSTOR 40600349.
