= The Eight (novel) =

1988 novel by Katherine Neville

- Cover of the first edition
- Author: Katherine Neville
- Genre: Quest
- Published: 1988 (Ballantine Books) (US); 1990 (Ballantine Books) (UK); 2009 (Harper)
- Publication place: United States
- Media type: Print (Hardcover and Paperback)
- Pages: 624
- ISBN: 0-345-35137-1 (US) / 978-0345366238 (UK)
- OCLC: 18070631
- Dewey Decimal: 823/.914 19
- LC Class: PS3564.E8517 E35 1989
- Followed by: The Fire

The Eight, published in 1988, is American author Katherine Neville's debut novel. It is an adventure/quest novel. A sequel, The Fire, appeared in 2008.

== Premise ==
The protagonist, computer whiz Catherine Velis, enters a conspiratorial world to recover the pieces of a legendary chess set once owned by Charlemagne and buried for one thousand years.

== Plot summary ==
The Eight features two intertwined storylines set two centuries apart. The first takes place in the 1970s and follows American computer expert Catherine "Cat" Velis as she is sent to Algeria for a special assignment. The second is set in the 1790s and revolves around Mireille, a novice nun at Montglane Abbey, in the French Pyrenees. The fates of both characters are interwoven as they try to unravel the mystery behind the Montglane Service, a chess set that holds the key to a game of unlimited power. A gift from the Moors to Emperor Charlemagne, these pieces have been hunted fervently throughout the years by those seeking ultimate control.

In the throes of the French Revolution, Mireille and her cousin Valentine must help in dispersing the pieces of the chess set to keep them out of the wrong hands. However, when Valentine is brutally murdered in the Reign of Terror, Mireille is thrown into the midst of men and women who would pursue power at any cost, including Napoleon, Robespierre, Talleyrand, Catherine the Great, and more. She comes to realize she must rely on her own intuition and tenacity to accomplish her goal.

In 1972, Cat Velis faces a similar atmosphere of conspiracy, assassination and betrayal. When she is requested by an antique dealer to recover the chess pieces, she unwittingly enters into a mysterious game that will endanger her life. As she learns the story of the Montglane Service, she begins to realize that players of the Game may plan their moves, but their very existence makes them pawns as well.

== The Montglane Service ==
The Montglane Service and Abbey are the creations of Katherine Neville. In The Eight, the set was once owned by Charlemagne. Its design is of early Indian influence and it is created from solid gold and precious gems. The weight and size of each piece is quite large, with pawns starting at about 3 inches high and kings and queens at 6 inches. The story describes how the Montglane Service received its name after it was given by Charlemagne to a loyal friend who controlled the Montglane region of France, and who later willed it to be protected by the nuns of Montglane. Neville based her concept of the chess set on similar sets described in medieval romances, such as the "Legend of Charlemagne", and the Charlemagne chessmen.

== Reception ==
The Eight received positive reviews from the San Francisco Chronicle and the Los Angeles Times Book Review. The Washington Post Book World called it "a feminist answer to Raiders of the Lost Ark". Florence King of The New York Times reviewed the book negatively, criticizing the plot and Neville's writing. Publishers Weekly said, "this spellbinder soars above the level of first-rate escapist entertainment.” Detroit News called the novel “A gutsy, multi-genre leap through history, full of puzzles and mysteries… The Eight‘s plotting and execution are masterfully handled.” “Intriguing, fast-moving… Crammed with skullduggery and a chess-based plot that hops between the eighteenth and [twentieth] centuries," said the Seattle Post-Intelligencer. Booklist praised the novel, stating, “The taut, suspenseful narrative is interwoven with a seemingly infinite number of mathematical puzzles, crosswords, and cryptograms… History, mystery, and adventure galore.”

== Release details ==
- Neville, Katherine (December 27, 1988). The Eight. Ballantine Books. ISBN 978-0-345-35137-1. LCCN 87091363.

== See also ==
- The Fire (2008 sequel)
