= Calderari =

Italian secret society

- Formation: Early 19th century
- Type: Conspiratorial organisation
- Purpose: defend the Catholic Church and fight Freemasons and Carbonari
- Location(s): Kingdom of Naples Kingdom of Sicily
- Key people: Antonio Capece Minutolo

The Calderari (lit. 'coppersmiths') was an informal network of secret revolutionary societies active in Italy in the early 1800s.

The Calderari sprung from the Carbonari, but were strongly opposed to them. Both the Calderari and the Carbonari had in view the political unification of Italy, and its liberation from foreign dominion, but differed from each other so widely, in regard to the means and the results, that a decided hostility has been the consequence.

== History ==
The masonic association of the Carbonari was introduced from France during the Parthenopean Republic, and gradually assumed the character of a revolutionary secret society. According to Grigorij Vladimirovič Orloff, the Calderari separated from the Carbonari in 1813. Staunchly Catholics and legitimists, the Calderari swore to defend the Church and vowed eternal hatred to Freemasons and Carbonari. Comprising three ranks of knight, prince, and grand prince, its emblem was a cauldron burning coal, an explicit reference to the grim struggle against the Carbonari.

After the restoration of the Bourbon dynasty (1816), the prince of Canosa, who was Ferdinand I’s Minister of Police, favored the Calderari to counteract the influence of the Carbonari, who opposed the House of Bourbon and supported liberal reforms. For this purpose, he organized them anew, divided them into wards, appointed a central ward in each province to oversee the rest, and gave them the name of Calderari del contrappeso (Calderari of the counterpoise), because they were to serve as a counterweight to the liberal Carbonari. He distributed 20,000 muskets among them; but, when the king was apprized of this hazardous undertaking, which had begun without his knowledge, a stop was put to any further proceedings by Canosa's dismissal and banishment. The Calderari, however, were not then abolished. Canosa was turned out of his office, which he had held but six months, on June 27, 1816; and, three monthns after his banishment, a royal decree was issued, renewing the prohibitions and penalties against all secret societies, not excepting the Calderari, and commanding their prosecution. However, they had lately manifested their attachment to the king.

Canosa himself, in an anonymous work (I Piffari di montagna, Dublin, 1820), has contradicted the statements of count Orloff with regard to him and the Calderari. According to his account, they sprang up, not in Naples, but in Palermo, when lord William Bentinck abolished trade guilds. This measure excited great dissatisfaction. The Calderari, in particular, declared to the queen Maria Carolina their readiness to take up arms against the British, and disturbances ensued, in which Neapolitan émigrés took a conspicuous part. Lord Bentinck had them sent to Naples, where they became active in the secret associations against Murat; and, on this occasion, one of the old societies, which had hitherto borne the name of Trinitarians, assumed that of Calderari. When it was proposed, in the ministry of 1816, to take strong measures against them, as the remains of the party of 1799, Canosa was for upholding the party, not for any selfish reason, but from the belief that they were a necessary counterpoise to the more numerous and formidable Carbonari. The society, however, has never adopted the name of Calderari of the counterpoise; and the story of the distribution of muskets is contradicted by Canosa, in the above-mentioned publication.

== Bibliography ==
- "Calderari". Encyclopedia Americana. Vol. 2. Philadelphia: Lea & Blanchard. 1847. p. 398.
- Calderari entry (in Italian) in the Enciclopedia Treccani
- Tonelli, Pasquale (1820). Breve idea della Carboneria, sua origine nel regno di Napoli, suo scopo, sua persecuzione, e causa che fa nascere la setta de' Calderari. Naples.
- Capece Minutolo, Antonio (1821). I Piffari di montagna ossia cenno estemporaneo di un cittadino imparziale sulla congiura del principe di Canosa e sopra i Carbonari. Epistola critica diretta all'estensore del Foglio letterario di Londra. Dublin.
- Johnston, R. M. (1904). The Napoleonic Empire In Southern Italy and the Rise of the Secret Societies (PDF). Vol. II. London: Macmillan and Co.
- Dito, Oreste (1905). Massoneria, Carboneria ed altre società segrete. Turin/Rome: Roux-Viarengo. pp. 210–230.
