= Silvio Pellico =

Italian writer, poet and dramatist (1789–1854)

- Portrait of Silvio Pellico
- Born: 24 June 1789; Saluzzo, Kingdom of Sardinia
- Died: 31 January 1854 (aged 64); Turin, Kingdom of Sardinia
- Occupation: Writer
- Parent(s): Onorato Pellico and Maria Margherita Pellico (née Tournier)
- Writing career
- Genres: Poetry, drama, memoir
- Notable work: My Prisons (1832)
- Movement: Romanticism

Silvio Pellico (Italian: [ˈsilvjo ˈpɛlliko]; 24 June 1789 – 31 January 1854) was an Italian writer, poet, dramatist and patriot active in the Italian unification. His legacy is mainly linked to his memoirs My Prisons.

== Biography ==
Silvio Pellico was born in Saluzzo, Piedmont. He spent the earlier portion of his life at Pinerolo and Turin, under the tuition of a priest named Manavella. At the age of ten, he composed a tragedy inspired by a translation of the Ossianic poems. On the marriage of his twin sister Rosina with a maternal cousin at Lyon, he went to reside in that city, devoting himself for four years to the study of French literature. He returned to Italy in 1809 and settled in Milan, where he became part of the circle that gravitated towards Ugo Foscolo and Vincenzo Monti and included such contemporaries as Ludovico di Breme, Giovanni Berchet, and Pietro Borsieri. In 1810, he became professor of French in the Collegio degli Orfani Militari, now the Scuola Militare Teulié.

His tragedy Francesca da Rimini, staged in Milan in 1815, and published three years later, is one of the first and one of the most successful to be inspired by the famous episode in the fifth canto of Dante's Inferno. The work received an enthusiastic review from Stendhal and captured the interest of Lord Byron, who translated it into English. It was brought out with success by Carlotta Marchionni at Milan in 1818. Its publication was followed by that of the tragedy Euphemio da Messina, but the representation of the latter was forbidden.

Pellico had in the meantime continued his work as a tutor, first to the unfortunate son of Count Briche, and then to the two sons of Count Porro Lambertenghi. He threw himself heartily into an attempt to weaken the hold of the Austrian despotism by indirect educational means.

Pellico was to the fore in the promotion and editing of the literary journal Il Conciliatore to which he also contributed. Of the powerful literary executives that gathered about Counts Porro and Confalonieri, Pellico was the able secretary on whom most of the responsibility for the review, the organ of the association, fell. His review articles included essays on Chénier (February–April 1819) and Schiller's Mary Stuart (July 1819), in which he elaborated his theory of the importance of historical themes in drama. The journal, under the censorship of the Austrian officials, ran for a year only, and the society itself was broken up by the government.

In October 1820, Pellico was arrested on the charge of carbonarism and conveyed to the Santa Margherita prison. After his removal to the Piombi at Venice in February 1821, he composed several Cantiche and the tragedies Ester d'Engaddi and Iginici d'Asti.

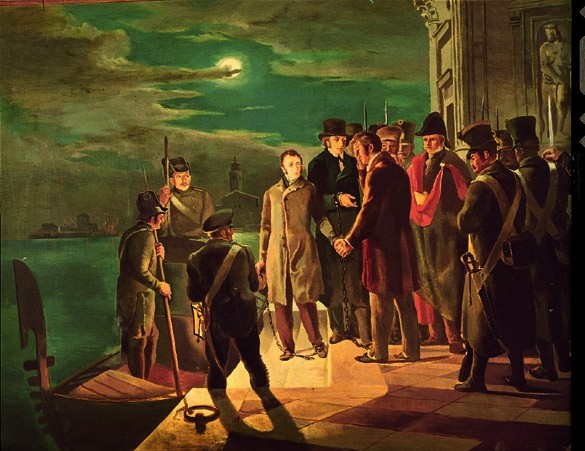
The Arrest of Silvio Pellico and Piero Maroncelli, Saluzzo, civic museum.

The sentence of death pronounced on him in February 1822 was finally commuted to fifteen years of jail in harsh condition, and in the following April he was placed in the Spielberg, at Brünn (today's Brno), where he was transferred via Udine and Ljubljana. His chief work during this part of his imprisonment was the tragedy Leoniero da Dertona, for the preservation of which he was compelled to rely on his memory.

After his release in 1830, he commenced the publication of his prison compositions, of which the Ester was played at Turin in 1831, but was immediately suppressed. In 1832, his Gismonda da Mendrisio, Erodiade and the Leoniero, appeared under the title of Tre nuove tragedie, and in the same year, the work which gave him his European fame, My Prisons, an account of his sufferings in prison. The last gained him the friendship of the Marchesa Juliette Colbert de Barolo, the reformer of the Turin prisons, and in 1834 he accepted from her a yearly pension of 1200 francs. His tragedy Tommaso Moro had been published in 1833, his most important subsequent publication being the Opere inedite in 1837.

On the decease of his parents in 1838, he was received into the Casa Barolo, where he remained until his death, assisting the marchesa in her charities, and writing chiefly upon religious themes, the best known of which is the essay Dei doveri degli uomini. A fragmentary biography of the marchesa by Pellico was published in Italian and English after her death.

Pellico died in Turin on 31 January 1854. He was buried in the Camposanto.

The late 19th-century English novelist George Gissing read the work, in Italian, whilst staying in Naples in November 1888. My prisons contributed to the Italian unification against Austrian occupation. This work was translated into virtually every European language during Pellico's lifetime.

== Main works ==
- Pellico, Silvio (1839). The imprisonments of Silvio Pellico. Edinburgh.: William and Robert Chambers.
- Pellico, Silvio (1889). My Prisons: Memoirs of Silvio Pellico. Introduction by Epes Sargent. Boston: Roberts Brothers.
- Pellico, Silvio (1897). Francesca da Rimini: A Tragedy. Translated by Rev JF Bingham. Hartford: Belknap and Warfield.
