= The Fire (Neville novel) =

2008 book by Katherine Neville

The Fire, published in 2008, is a novel by American author Katherine Neville. It is an adventure/quest novel which is a sequel to her debut novel The Eight. The main character, Alexandra Solarin (daughter of Catherine Velis), must enter into a cryptic world of danger and conspiracy in order to recover the pieces of the Montglane Service, a legendary chess set once owned by Charlemagne. The novel contains several repeated elements from The Eight and was a New York Times Bestseller for six months.

== Plot summary ==
The Fire is launched thirty years after the events of The Eight, when a chess piece from the Montglane Service mysteriously resurfaces in Russia. The children of the previous characters know nothing of the quest of their parents, but are drawn into it nonetheless — and “The Game” is afoot again.

The plot moves between modern day and the early 1800s, 30 years after the French Revolution. In 2008, Alexandra arrives to find that her mother is missing and that a series of strategically placed clues, followed swiftly by the unexpected arrival of a mysterious assortment of house guests, indicates that something sinister is afoot. Alexandra is swept into a journey that takes her from Colorado to the Russian wilderness and at last into her own hometown: Washington D.C.

In 1822, Haidée – the daughter of a powerful ruler in the Ottoman Empire – is sent on a dangerous mission to smuggle a crucial piece of the Montglane Service out of Albania to the hands of the one man who might be able to save it. Haidée's journey from Albania to Morocco to Rome to Greece, and into the very heart of The Game, leads to revelations about the powerful chess set and its history.

== Reception ==
The Fire received rave reviews, spending more than 6 months on bestseller lists around the world, including France, Spain, Holland, New York, Denver, Seattle, San Francisco, and DC. The Washington Post called the novel “[An] exotic, labyrinthine conspiracy tale . . . the perfect escapist adventure.” The Chicago Sun-Times stated, "Katherine Neville’s follow up to The Eight, a cult classic that impressed many readers as a more intelligent and literary precursor to Dan Brown’s The Da Vinci Code. . . The Fire impresses as much for its literary aspects as it does for its action, puzzles and suspense . . . This is a book to be savored as it’s read, and admired for the beauty of its accomplishment.”

In 2009 Neville was awarded the Silver Nautilus Book Award for Visionary Fiction for the novel.'
