= A Calculated Risk =

1992 financial thriller

- Author: Katherine Neville
- Genre: Financial thriller
- Publication date: 1992
- Publication place: United States

A Calculated Risk, published in 1992, is American author Katherine Neville's second novel. It is a financial thriller.

== Synopsis ==
Verity Banks is the senior woman executive at the Bank of the World, a global financial institution. She heads the department of Electronic Funds Transfer but finds herself stonewalled when she makes any proposal to step up the bank's computer security. Verity soon decides to prove the weakness of the bank's security by stealing from the very systems she has worked to protect. Upon hearing her plan, her mentor Tor sets a challenge to see which of them can steal a billion dollars and subsequently invest it to earn thirty million in three months - upping the stakes dramatically.

== Reception ==
- New York Times notable book
- A Book-of-the-Month Club Alternate Selection

A Calculated Risk received positive reception when it was published in 1992 — not only in the literary sector, but in the financial media and university business courses. Over 15 years later, during the financial meltdown of 2009, it reappeared on many independent bestseller lists.

The New York Times Book Review praised Neville's plotting, and found it to be "more plausible because of her intimate knowledge of how international banking works". The Los Angeles Daily News called it "dizzying (and) enjoyable", while the Los Angeles Times commended the "fine degree of tension".
