= Špilberk Castle =

Czech fortress

- hrad Špilberk
- Brno, South Moravia
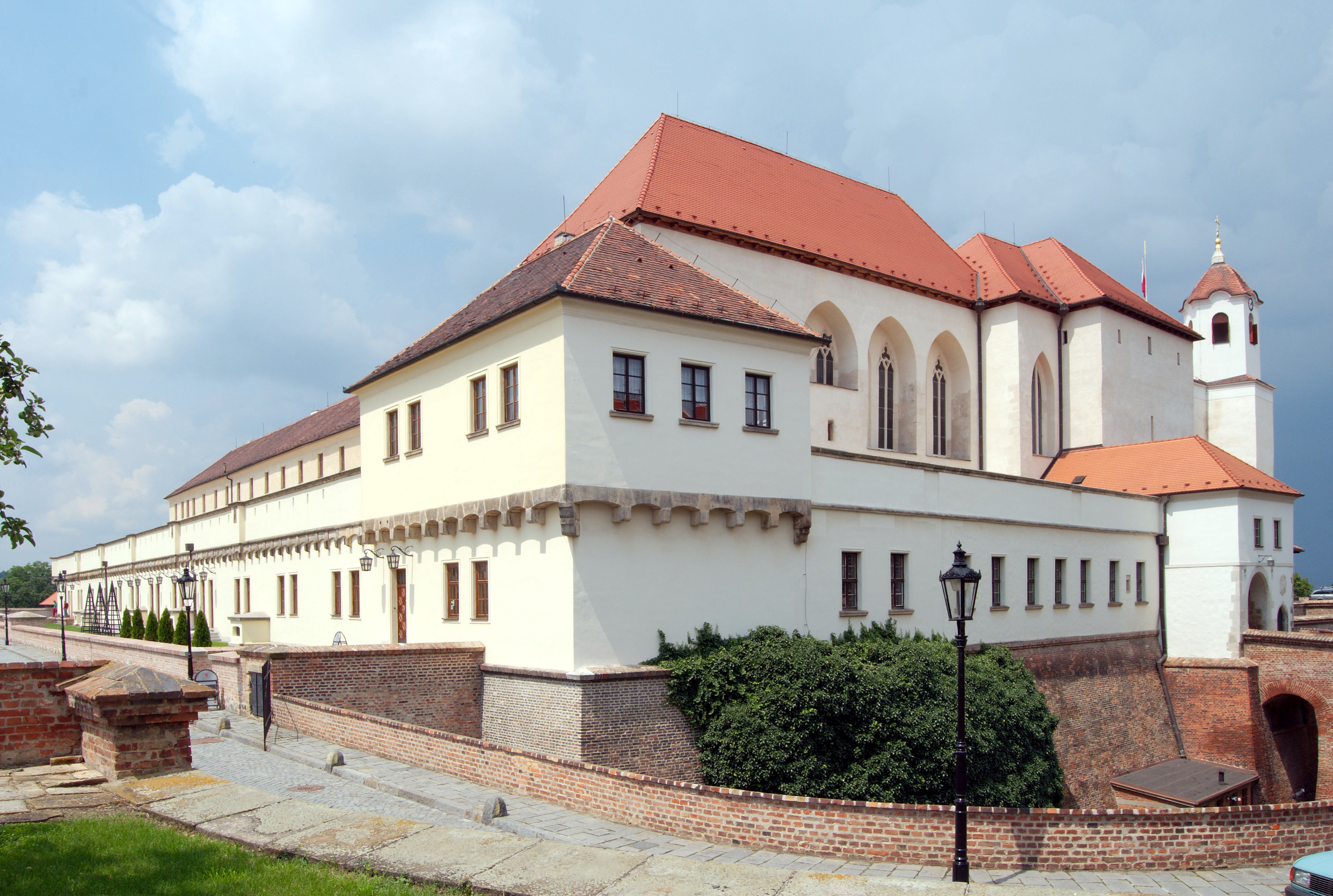
- Špilberk Castle

Site information
- Type: Castle, later citadel

Location
- Location in the Czech Republic
- Coordinates: 49°11′39.44″N 16°35′56.09″E

Site history
- Built: 13th century

Špilberk Castle (Czech: hrad Špilberk; German: Spielberg, locally Špilas) is a castle on the hilltop in Brno, Southern Moravia. Its construction began as early as the first half of the 13th century by the Přemyslid kings and completed by King Ottokar II of Bohemia.

From a major royal castle established around the mid-13th century, and the seat of the Moravian margraves in the mid-14th century, it was gradually turned into a huge baroque citadel considered the harshest prison in the Austrian Empire, and then into barracks. This prison had always been part of the Špilberk fortress and is frequently referenced by Fabrice Del Dongo, the main protagonist in Stendhal's historical novel The Charterhouse of Parma.

== History ==
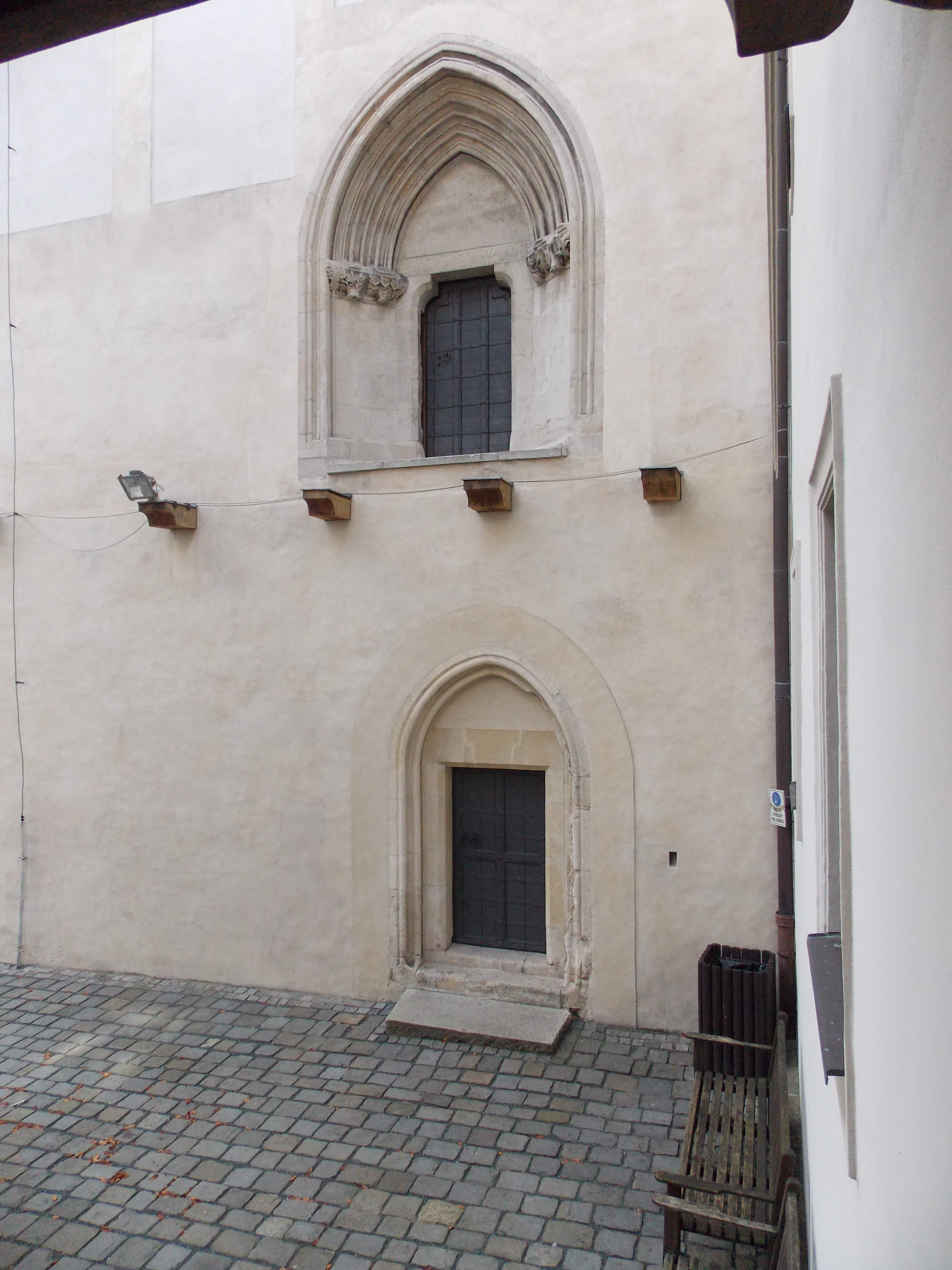
Early gothic Arch (13th century) Jobst's royal residence

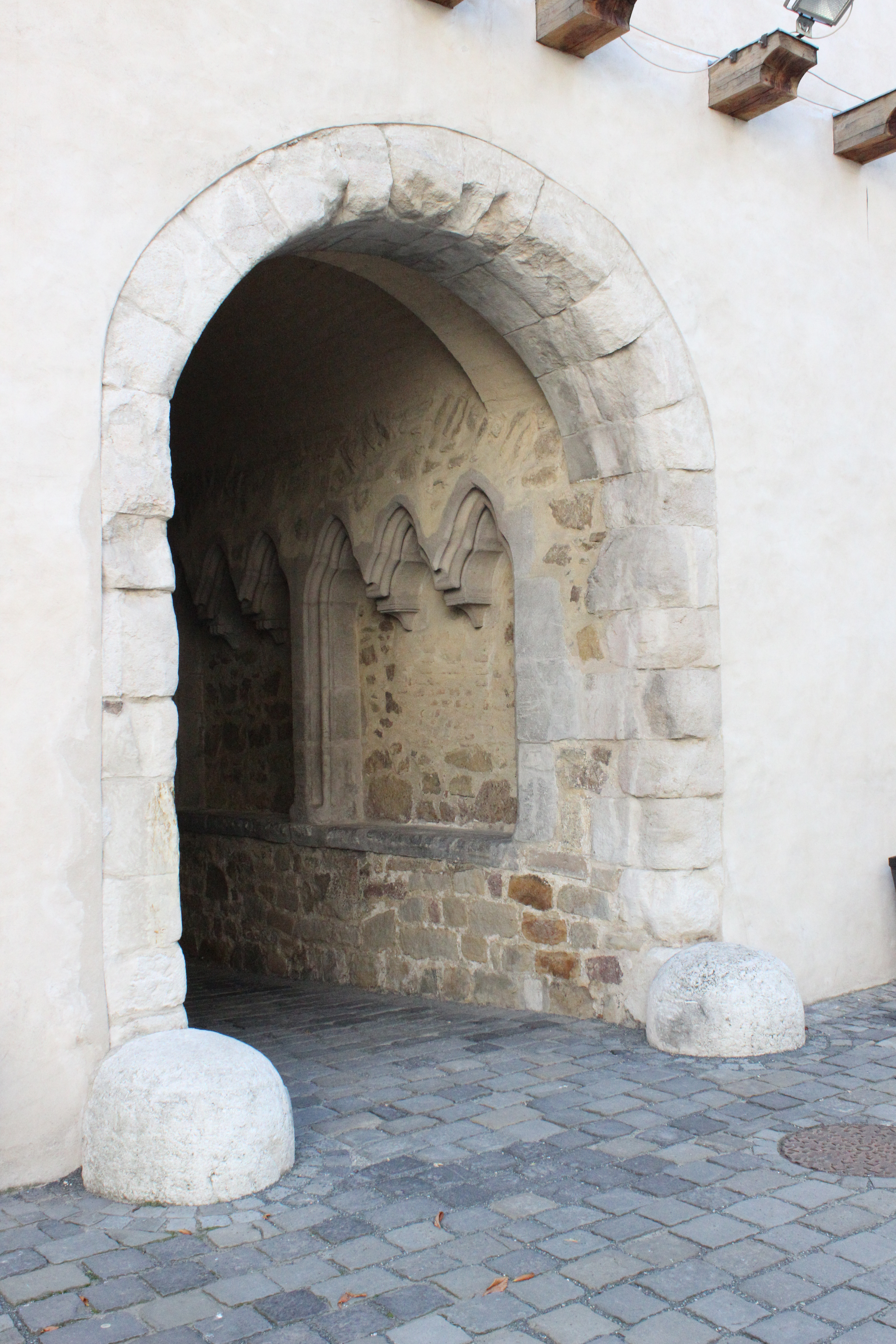
Early gothic entrance to (The oldest royal) the first courtyard

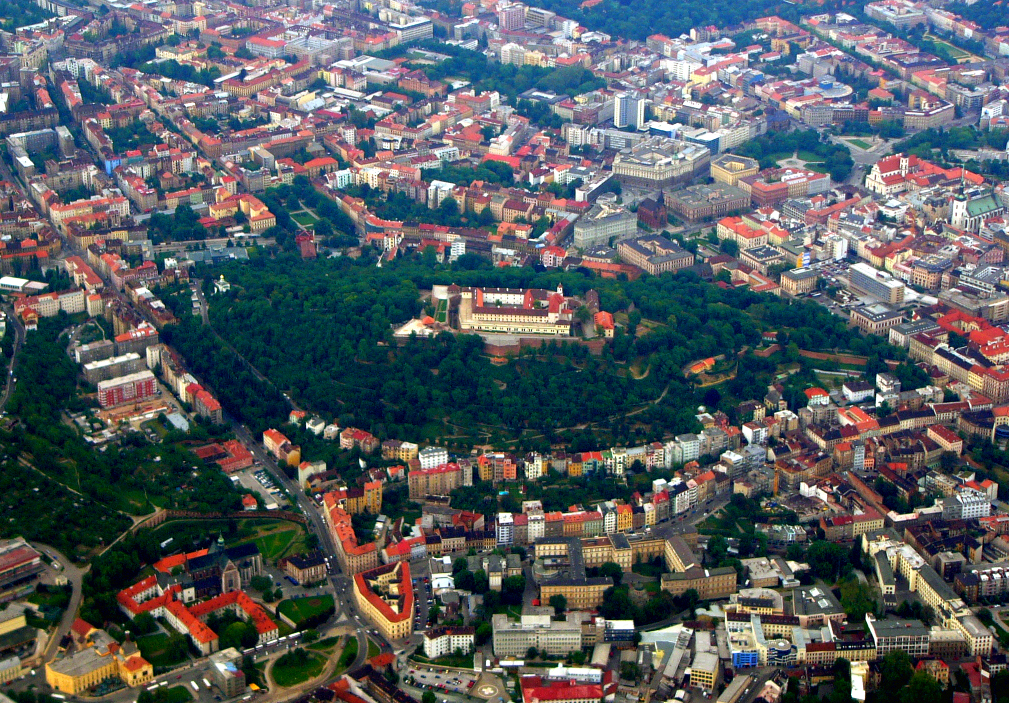
Aerial view of the castle

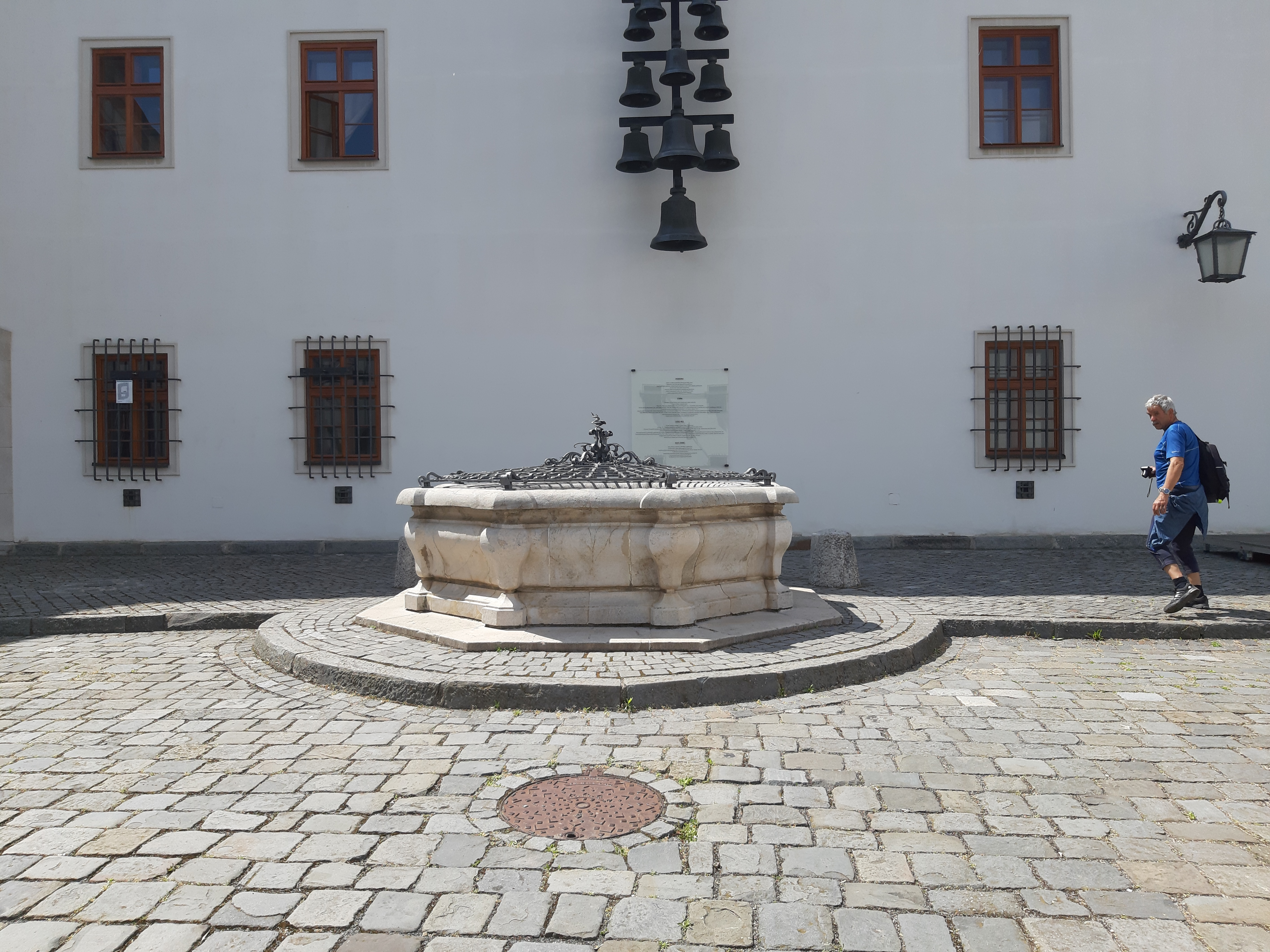
Water well at second courtyard

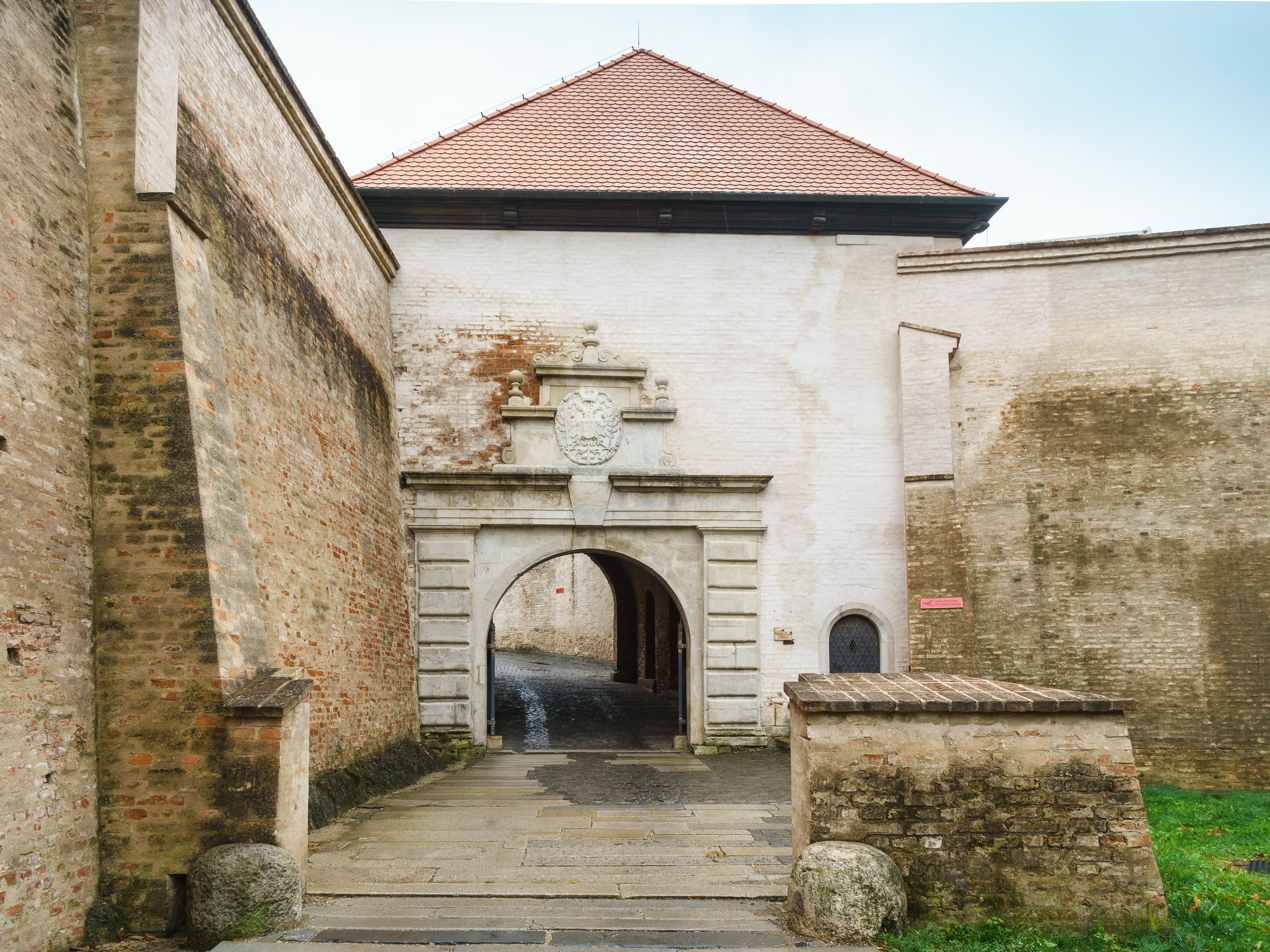
The mannerist architecture gate in latest baroque part of the fortifications

In 1620, after losing The Battle of White Mountain on November 8, the leading Moravian members of the anti-Habsburg insurrection were imprisoned in Špilberk for several years. The town of Brno bought the castle in 1560 and made it into a municipal fortress. The bastion fortifications of Špilberk helped Brno to defend itself against Swedish raids during the Thirty Years' War, and then successful defence led to further fortification and the strengthening of the military function of the fortress.

At the same time Špilberk was used as a prison. Protestants were the first prisoners forced to serve time here, followed later by participants in the revolutions of 1848–49, although hardened criminals, thieves and petty criminals were also kept here. Franz Freiherr von der Trenck, Austrian soldier and one of the most controversial persons of the period was also jailed and died here on October 4, 1749. Later, apart from several significant French revolutionaries captured during the coalition wars with France, Jean-Baptiste Drouet, famous as the former postmaster of Sainte-Menehould who had arrested King Louis XVI, was the most known of them all. A group of fifteen Hungarian Jacobins led by the writer Ferenc Kazinczy was also especially noteworthy.

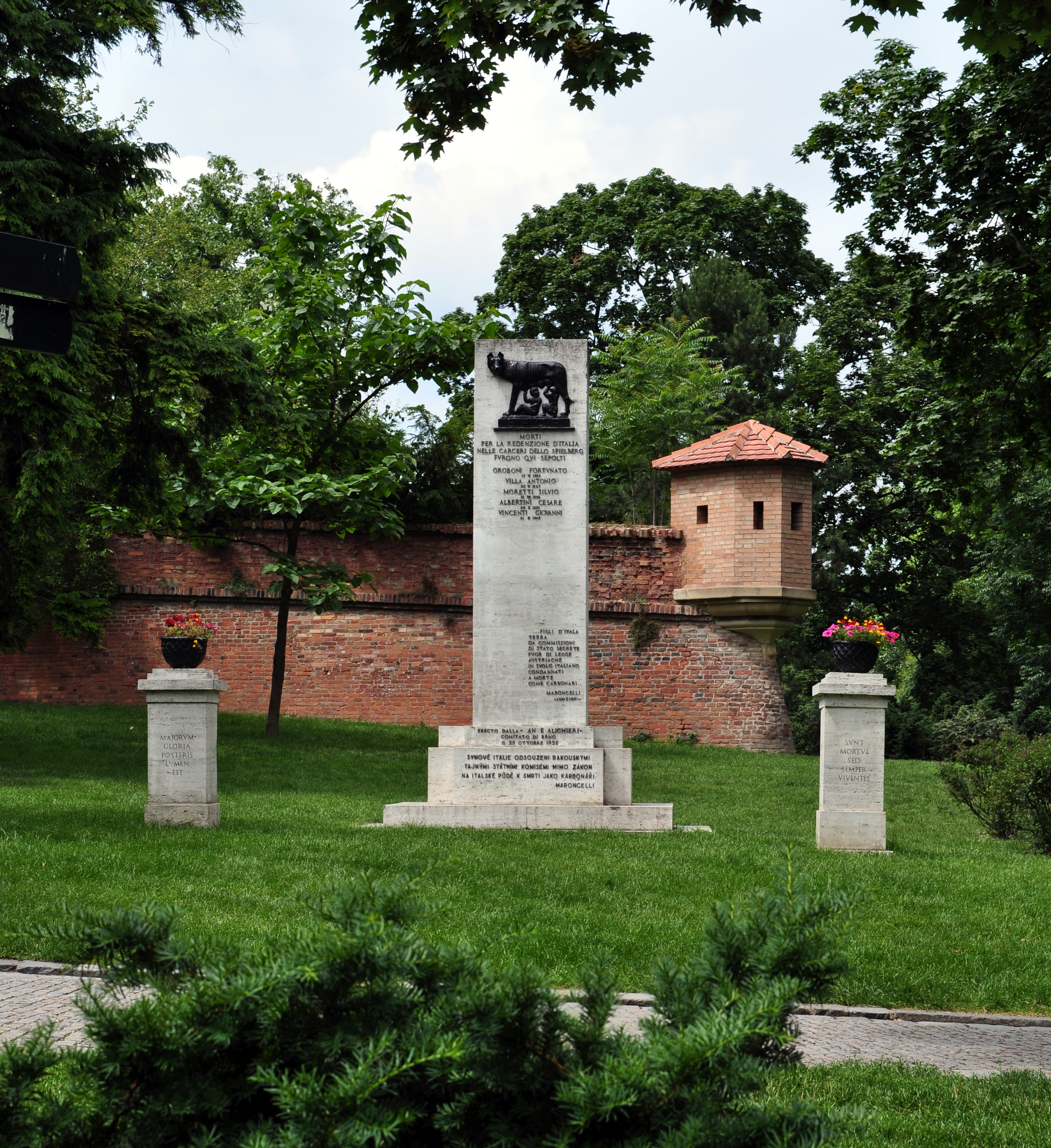
Memorial to Italian Carbonari

More than a quarter of a century later, from 1822 on, specially constructed cells for "state prisoners" in the northern wing of the former fortress were filled with Italian patriots known as Carbonari, who had fought for the unification, freedom and independence of their country. The poet Silvio Pellico, who served a full eight years here, made the Špilberk prison famous all over Europe with his book My Prisons.

The last large "national" group of political prisoners at Špilberk consisted of nearly 200 Polish revolutionaries, mostly participants in the Kraków Uprising of 1846. After that, the Austrian Emperor Franz Joseph I dissolved the Špilberk prison in 1855, and after departure of the last prisoners three years later, its premises were converted into barracks which remained as such for the next hundred years.

Špilberk entered public consciousness as a centre of tribulation and oppression on two more occasions; firstly, during the First World War when, together with military prisoners, civilian objectors to the Austro-Hungarian regime were imprisoned here, and secondly in the first year of the Nazi occupation of Czechoslovakia. Several thousand Czech patriots suffered in Špilberk at that time, some of whom were put to death. For the majority of them however, Špilberk was only a station on their way to other German prisons and Nazi concentration camps. In 1939–1941, the German army and Gestapo carried out an extensive reconstruction at Špilberk in order to turn it into model barracks in the spirit of the romantic historicism of the German Third Reich ideology.

The Czechoslovak army left Špilberk in 1959, putting to a definite end its military era. The following year, Špilberk became the seat of the Brno City Museum.

== See also ==
- List of castles in the South Moravian Region
