= Scalvini =

Scalvini is a surname. Notable people with the surname include:

- Gianluigi Scalvini (born 1971), Italian motorcycle road racer
- Giorgio Scalvini (born 2003), Italian footballer
- Pietro Scalvini (1718–1792), Italian painter

== See also ==
- Salvini (surname)
