= Katherine Neville (author) =

American novelist

- Born: 1945 (age 80–81); Missouri, U.S.
- Occupation: Author
- Spouse: Dr. Karl Pribram
- Writing career
- Period: 1988–present
- Genre: Quest / Adventure fiction
- Notable works: The Eight, The Fire, The Magic Circle, A Calculated Risk
- Website: www.katherineneville.com

Katherine Neville (born 1945) is a New York Times, USA Today and #1 internationally bestselling American author who writes adventure/quest novels. Her novels include The Eight (1988), A Calculated Risk (1992), The Magic Circle (1998) and The Fire (2008), which is a sequel to The Eight.

== Biography ==
Katherine Neville was born in the midwest and attended university in Colorado, later doing postgraduate studies in African literature. She then moved to New York City and began a career in the computer field working for IBM in transportation and energy.

In the 1970s Neville was an international data processing consultant to the Algerian government, and in the late 1970s she went to work at the Department of Energy's nuclear research site in Idaho. Between jobs and during school, she supported herself as a painter and a model. This experience led her to develop her own photography skills and eventually start a photography business in Colorado, which she ran for several years.

In 1980, she moved to San Francisco and became a vice president at Bank of America. After publication of her first book (The Eight), she moved to Europe, living in Vienna, Austria, and northern Germany, with her spouse, the late neuroscientist Dr. Karl Pribram. In the 1990s Neville and Pribram moved to Virginia and Washington, DC. Her restoration of renowned potter Teruo Hara's home and studio was featured in The Washington Post.

== Works ==
Neville's novels have been compared with the works of Alexandre Dumas, Umberto Eco, Charles Dickens, and Steven Spielberg. Her books have been translated into forty languages and are in print in over 80 countries. Neville’s books have appeared on bestseller lists and received multiple awards and honors around the world.

Year	Novel	Print	Ebook	Audio
1988	The Eight	Random House / Ballantine (Trade ISBN 9780345419088 & Mass Market 9780345366238)	Open Road	Random House Audio
1992	A Calculated Risk	Random House / Ballantine (Mass Market 9780345386823)	Open Road	
1998	The Magic Circle	Random House / Ballantine (Mass Market 9780345423139)	Open Road	Random House Audio / BDD (abridged)
2008	The Fire	Random House / Ballantine (Trade Paperback 9780345500687)	Open Road	Random House Audio

=== Short stories and chapters ===
- Acqua Vitae (in Romantic Times Booklovers: The Haunted West). November 12, 2018.
- Cuba Libre (in Mystery Writers of America: Ice Cold: Tales of Intrigue from the Cold War. Edited by Jeffery Deaver & Raymond Benson). April 1, 2014.
- The Lunar Society (in The Mystery Writers of America: The Mystery Box. Edited by Brad Meltzer). January 1, 2013.
- En Passant (in Masters of Technique. Edited by Howard Goldowsky). June 16, 2010.
- The Tuesday Club (in Thriller: Stories to Keep you Up All Night. Edited by James Patterson). June 1, 2006.
- Chapter 13 (in I’d Kill for That, a serial novel. Edited by Marcia Talley). May 1, 2004.
- The Yi-Ching: A Yarrow-ing Experience (in I Should Have Stayed Home: The Worst Trips of Great Writers. Edited by R. Rapoport & M. Castanera). October 1, 1994.
- La Bellini's Favors (in Sisters in Crime 4. Edited by Marilyn Wallace). January 1, 1991.

=== Essays and forewords ===
- Edgar Allan Poe’s “The Narrative of Arthur Gordon Pym of Nantucket” (in Thrillers: 100 Must Reads. Edited by David Morrell and Hank Wagner). July 5, 2010.
- Foreword to Turning the Solomon Key by Robert Lomas. September 1, 2007.

== Reception ==
The Eight garnered international acclaim upon its release and continues to be ranked as a top thriller novel. Publishers Weekly said, “Even readers with no interest in chess will be swept up into this astonishing fantasy-adventure… Neville has great fun rewriting history and making it all ring true. With two believable heroines, nonstop suspense, espionage, murder, and a puzzle that seems the key to the whole Western mystical tradition, this spellbinder soars above the level of first-rate escapist entertainment.” The Washington Post called The Eight "A feminist answer to Raiders of the Lost Ark." The Boston Herald lauded the novel as “The female counterpart to Umberto Eco’s The Name of the Rose… Impossible to put down.”

A Calculated Risk was selected as a New York Times Notable Book for 1992. Newgate Callendar of the New York Times Book Review said, “Never a dull moment, and Ms Neville makes it all the more plausible because of her intimate knowledge of how international banking works. She plots well and takes the reader through the intrigues and backbiting of immense corporations…[A Calculated Risk] churns up wave after wave of excitement."

Booklist called The Magic Circle "compelling" and noted that "fans of that emerging subgenre —– the millennial thriller —- will want to add this one to their reading list.” Beth Dora Reisberg of January Magazine termed The Magic Circle a "tour de force."

The Fire, Neville's sequel to The Eight, topped bestseller lists internationally and quickly became a New York Times Bestseller. In a 2008 review in The Independent of London, Barry Forshaw declared that The Fire was much better than The Da Vinci Code. The Chicago Sun-Times stated, "Katherine Neville’s follow up to The Eight, a cult classic that impressed many readers as a more intelligent and literary precursor to Dan Brown’s The DaVinci Code. . . The Fire impresses as much for its literary aspects as it does for its action, puzzles and suspense . . . This is a book to be savored as it’s read, and admired for the beauty of its accomplishment.”

Neville’s books have been bestsellers in many countries, and appeared on many bestseller lists in the United States, including USA Today, New York Times, Publishers Weekly, Wall Street Journal, Indie List, Seattle Times, San Francisco Chronicle, Los Angeles Times, Washington Post, St Paul Pioneer Press, and Denver Post.

== Awards and honors ==
- 1988: Katherine Neville received the first full-page interview given to an unpublished author, in Publishers Weekly.
- 1989: The Eight was chosen "Critics' Choice" by the editors of People Magazine.
- 1990: The Eight received the award for "Best Historic Fiction" from the editors of Romantic Times Magazine.
- 1991: Katherine Neville was the invited keynote speaker at the prestigious Âteneo de Madrid.
- 1992: A Calculated Risk was selected a New York Times "Notable Book of the Year".
- 1999: The Eight, in a national readers' poll by the noted Spanish journal El Pais, was voted one of the top ten books of all time.
- 2000: Katherine Neville was awarded the Turkish Cultural Ministry's Medallion of Merit.
- 2009: Neville was awarded the prestigious Silver Nautilus Book Award for Visionary Fiction for her novel The Fire (sequel to The Eight).
- 2010: The Eight was included by the editors of Thrillers: 100 Must-Reads (Oceanview Press) as one of the best one hundred thrillers of all time.
- 2018: National Public Radio includes The Eight in "Audience Picks: 100 Best Killer Thrillers."
- 2019: Amazon.com includes The Eight in "100 Mysteries & Thrillers to Read in a Lifetime."
- 2025: Ocultura and the Festival de las Ánimas (two Literary & Art Festivals in Spain) honored Katherine Neville and her novels. Festival de las Animas awarded Neville with their Mask of Souls Award (2025 Máscara de Ánimas Award). They describe the award as "a prize that celebrates her career and her ability to intertwine history, magic, and hidden knowledge in her novels."

== Board memberships and sponsorships ==
- Katherine Neville was the first author invited to serve on the advisory board of the Smithsonian Libraries in Washington, D.C., where she is emerita, having served a full three terms. Smithsonian sponsorships:
  - Neville co-sponsored, with Dr. Karl Pribram, the Smithsonian Libraries’ Neville-Pribram Mid-Career Educators Award, the first grant in the U.S. created for mid-career teachers in middle school, high school and college.
  - Neville created the Smithsonian Libraries’ 50th Anniversary: Famous Author Tributes - a series of brief films of personal tributes to the importance of libraries by award-winning journalists, historians, novelists, and poets.
- Katherine Neville created and sponsored Art In Literature: The Mary Lynn Kotz Award, given jointly by two prestigious institutions: the Library of Virginia and the Virginia Museum of Fine Arts. The award, for excellence in writing about the visual arts, is the first of its kind, given in multiple categories, including history, biography, fiction, poetry, journalism, young adult, and museum catalogues.
- Katherine Neville is one of the original sponsoring co-founders of the International Thriller Writers Association.
- Neville currently serves on the advisory board of the Authors Guild Foundation in New York.
