= Piombi =

Building in Venice, Italy

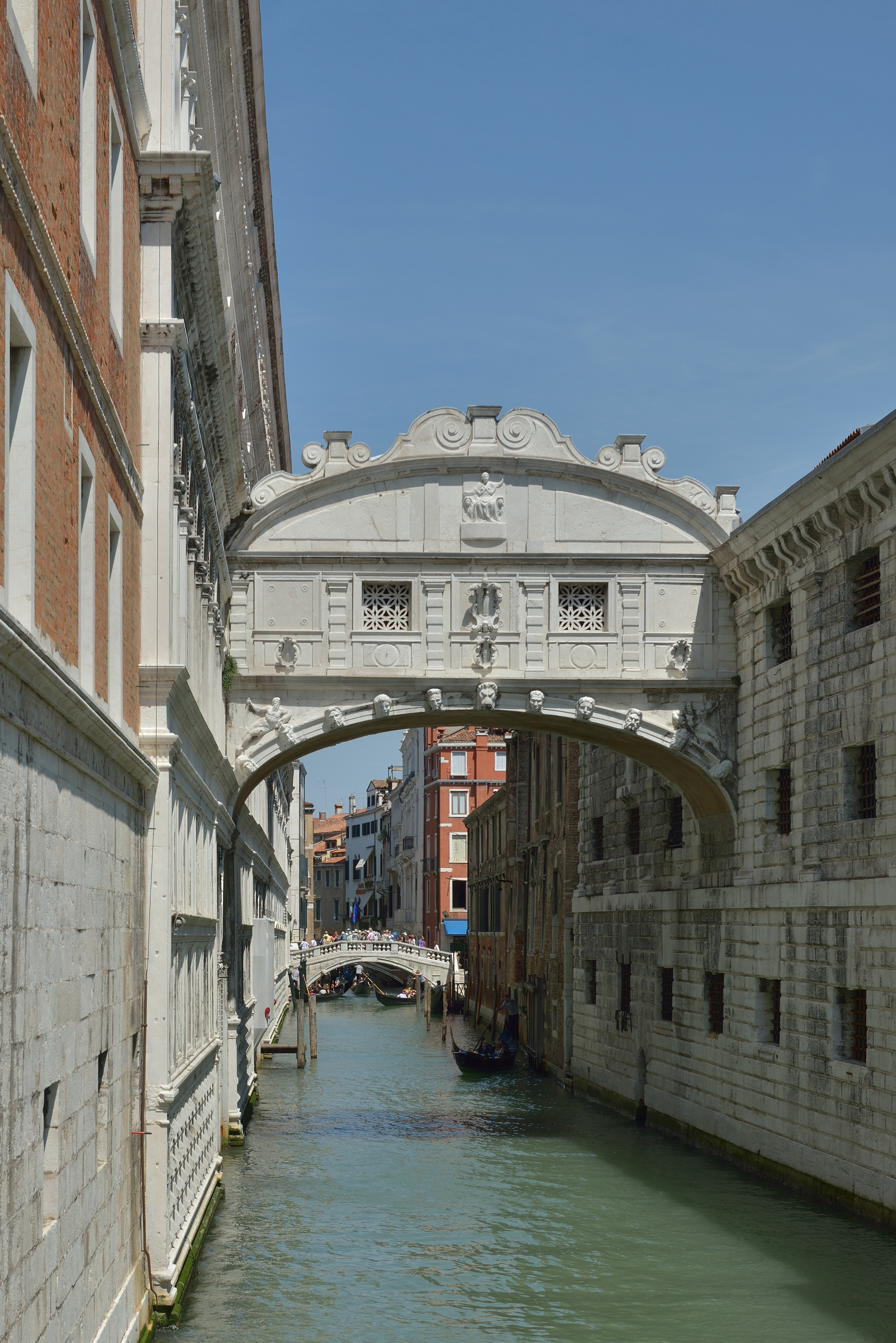
- The Bridge of Sighs and the Piombi prison on the left.

- Location within Italy

General information
- Location: Venice, Metropolitan City of Venice, Italy
- Coordinates: 45°26′02″N 12°20′27″E

Piombi ("The Leads" in English) is a former prison in the Doge's Palace in Venice. The name of the prison refers to its position in the attic, directly under the roof of the palace, which was covered with slabs of lead. In winter, these slabs let the cold pass and they acted as a conductor in the summer heat, imposing harsh conditions for inmates.

== Description ==
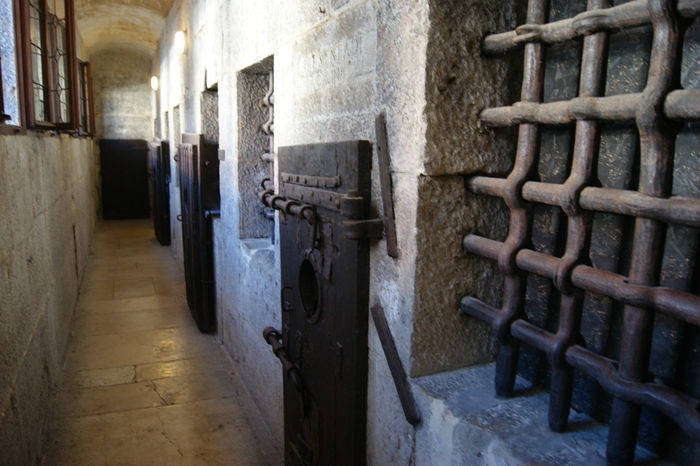
Interior of Piombi Prison, one of the Old Prisons in Doge's Palace in Venice.

The Piombi prison was divided into six rooms, separated by wooden partitions strengthened with iron plates. Access to the prison was by two staircases, one located in the Sala dei Tre Capi (the three chiefs room) and the other in a corridor near the Sala degli Inquisitori di Stato (Hall of the State Inquisitors). Light is reached through small windows overlooking the waterway called Rio di Palazzo. The ceilings were made of lead, but under this was a double planking in larch, which made the prisons hot in summer.

The inmates could have furniture and furnishings such as beds and dishes. They had medical assistance, food brought from outside or to order, and a cash allowance for small needs.

== History ==
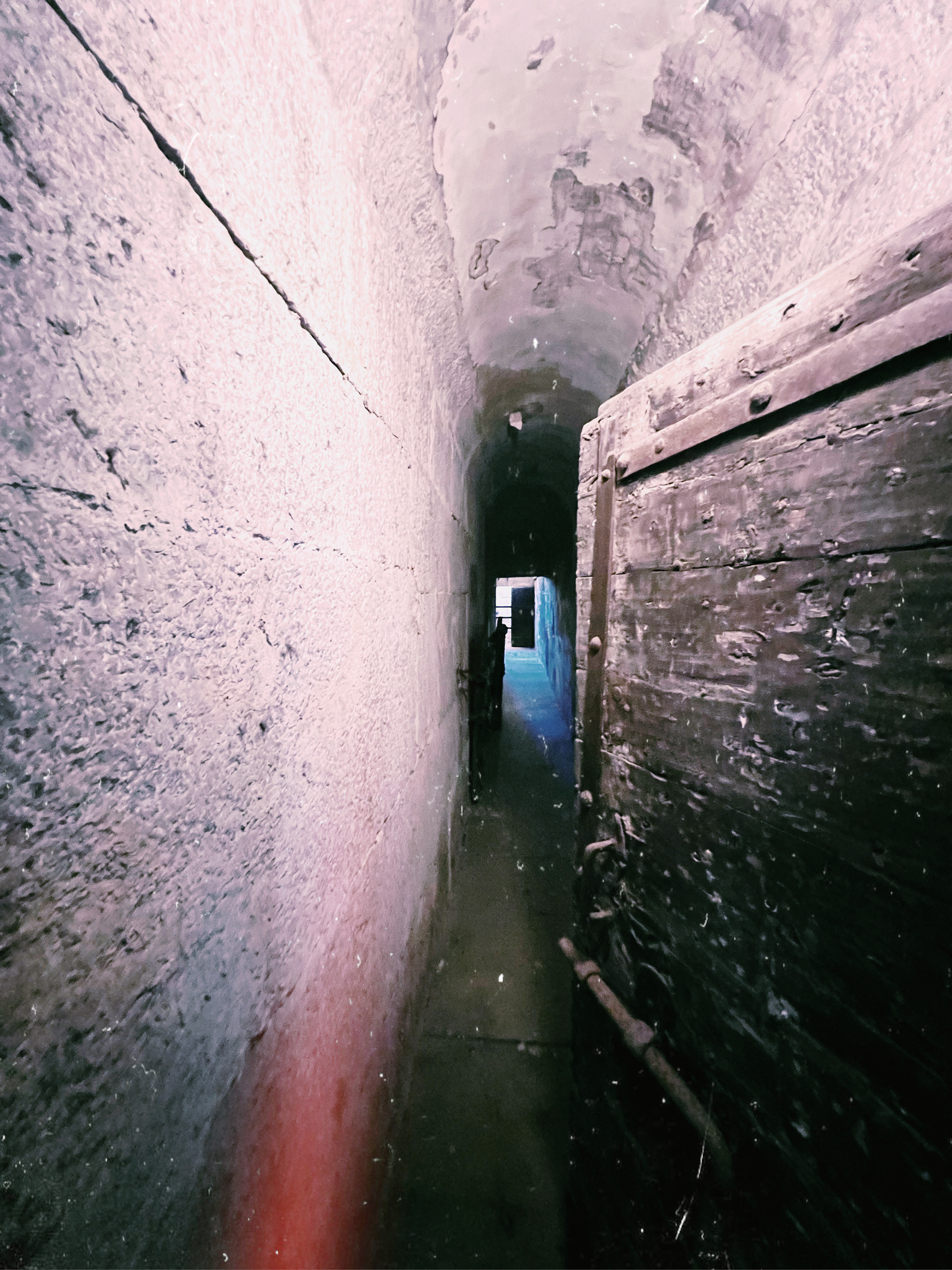
Prisons of Venice called "Piombi"

Construction dates back to the 16th century, which is testified by a promulgation of the Council of Ten, dated March 15, 1591. It said that since the pre-existing Wells were too harsh for the detention of prisoners it was necessary to build a new structure to house those convicted of minor crimes. The Piombi were built in the attic of the building, where the Council of Ten had its archive, above the Sala dei Tre Capi.

Some famous people were imprisoned there, including Paolo Antonio Foscarini and Giacomo Casanova. On November 1, 1756, Giacomo Casanova made a famous escape from the prison. He published the story of his escape in 1787.

In 1797, Piombi was abandoned due to a reorganization of prison use. It was replaced as a city prison currently used for drug addicts, located on the island of Giudecca, until 1926.

The old prisons inside the Doge's Palace were supplemented by the New Prison, built across the Rio de Palazzo from the palace. The New Prison was connected to the old prisons in the Palace by the Bridge of Sighs.

== See also ==
- History of the Doge's Palace in Venice
