= Giuseppe Nicolini =

Giuseppe Nicolini may refer to:

- Giuseppe Nicolini (composer) (1762–1842), Italian composer
- Giuseppe Placido Nicolini (1877–1973), Roman Catholic bishop
- Giuseppe Nicolini (writer) (1788–1855), Italian poet, literary critic and politician
- Giuseppe Nicolini (sculptor) (1855–?), Italian sculptor
