= Nicolini =

Nicolini may refer to:

- 15386 Nicolini, main-belt asteroid named after the astronomer Martino Nicolini

== People ==
- Stage name of Nicolo Grimaldi (1673–1732), Italian mezzo-soprano castrato
- Angelo Nicolini (1505–1567), Italian cardinal
- Bruno Nicolini (born 1969), civil name of the French singer Bénabar
- Emanuele Nicolini (1984), Sammarinese swimmer
- Enrico Nicolini (born 1955), Italian former professional footballer and manager
- Ernesto Nicolini (1834–1898), French operatic tenor
- Giuseppe Nicolini (composer) (1762–1842), Italian composer
- Giuseppe Nicolini (sculptor) (1855–?), Italian sculptor
- Giuseppe Nicolini (writer) (1788–1855), Italian writer
- Giuseppe Placido Nicolini O.S.B. (1877–1973), Roman Catholic Bishop of Assisi
- Gregorio González Nicolini (born 1974), Chilean film producer and financial engineer
- Ignacio Nicolini (born 1988), Uruguayan footballer
- Jill Nicolini (born 1978), American model, actress and reality TV show participant
- Michelle Nicolini (born 1982), Brazilian Jiu-Jitsu practitioner and mixed martial artist
