= Romanticism in Italy =

Literary and artistic movement

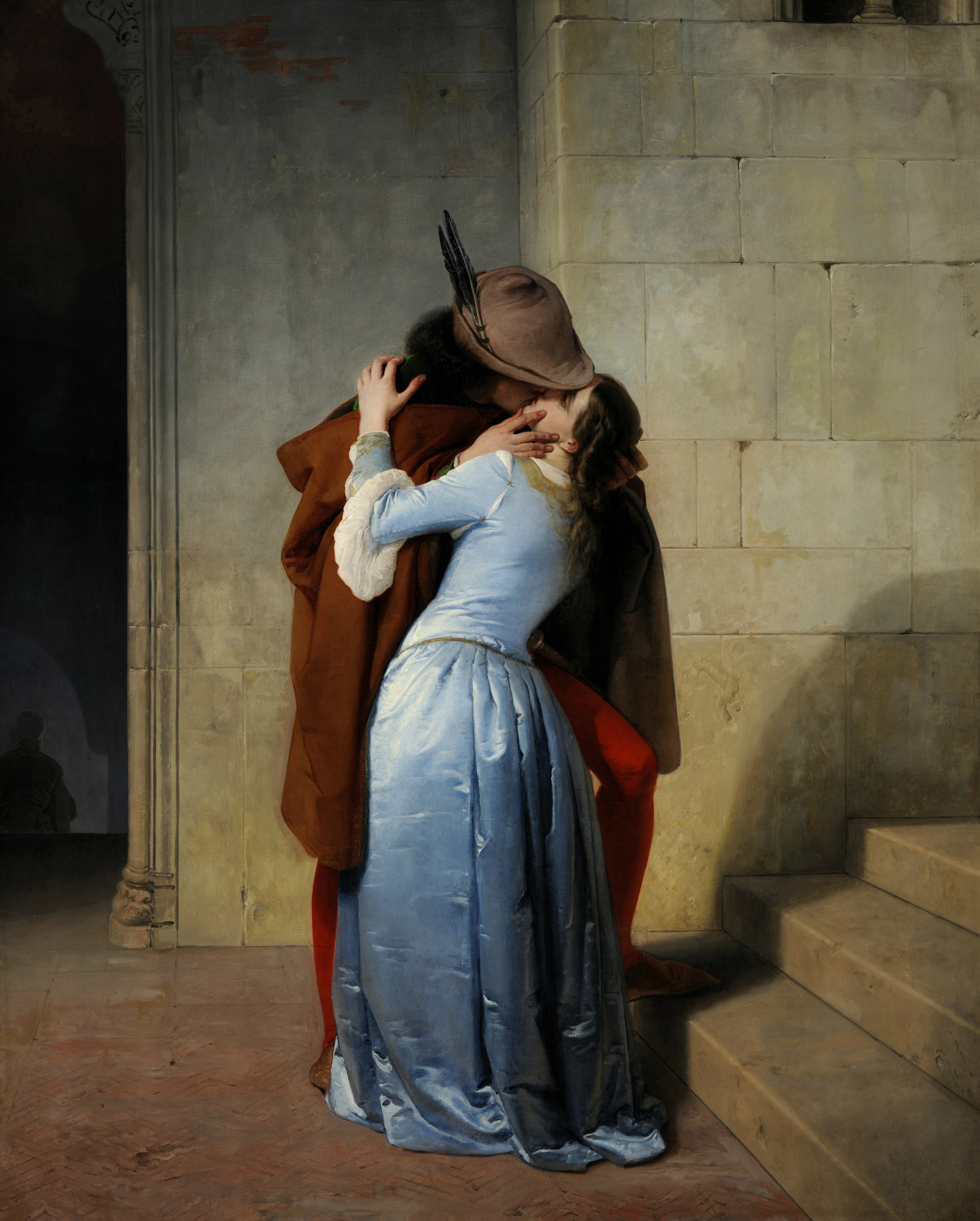
- The Kiss by Francesco Hayez, iconic painting of Romantic art in Italy
- Years active: Late 18th century to 19th-mid-late
- Location: Italy
- Major figures: Ugo Foscolo, Vittorio Alfieri, Giovanni Berchet, Ludovico di Breme, Carlo Porta, Alessandro Manzoni, Giacomo Leopardi, Giuseppe Mazzini, Antonio Rosmini, Vincenzo Gioberti, Massimo d'Azeglio, Francesco De Santis, Bertrando Spaventa, Francesco Hayez, Giovanni Migliara, Giuseppe Bezzuoli, Francesco Podesti, Gioacchino Rossini, Giuseppe Verdi
- Influences: Vico, Herder, Goethe, Jansenism, Graveyard poets, Scottish school, Cousin
- Influenced: Italian Risorgimento, Italian opera, Italian idealism

Romanticism in Italy was a distinctive blend of European romantic ideals and Italian cultural traditions. It emphasized relationship with nature, emotion, imagination and individual freedom, as well as reevaluating the spiritual, religious, and historical aspects of national identity, generating a desire for political union.

Romantic culture in Italy thus played a key role in the Risorgimento, tying itself to the struggle for national unity. While sharing common ground with Romanticism elsewhere in Europe, such as opposition to the Enlightenment and Neoclassicism, Italian Romanticism developed distinctive characteristics influenced by Italy's own classical heritage and its unique political context.

== Early developments ==
Italian Romanticism found its early development influenced by the Napoleonic era and its dramatic shifts in political landscapes and social structures.

The experience of the Jacobin republics contributed to the convergence of two factors: the desire for independence from foreign domination, and the need for liberal reforms, that would guarantee freedom of thought, in economy and religion, against the despotism of absolutist regimes.

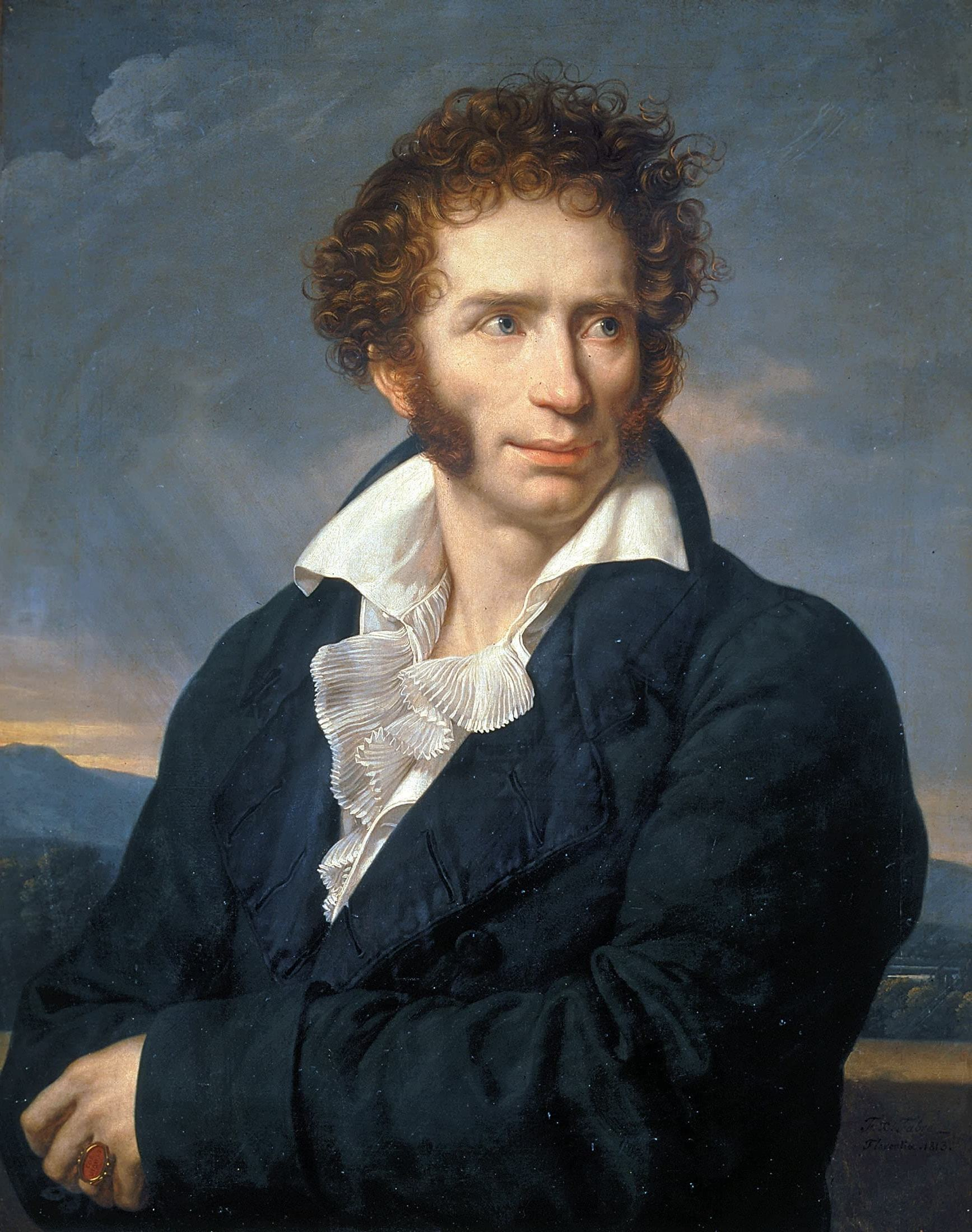
Portrait of Ugo Foscolo by François-Xavier Fabre

Among the first pre-Romantic authors, influenced nevertheless by classicism, Vittorio Alfieri (1749–1803) in his tragedies exalted individual heroism against all tyranny, including that arising from the French Revolution, and incited the redemption of the homeland and the struggle for self-affirmation.

Ugo Foscolo (1778–1827) imbued the concept of homeland with sentimental and even epic or mythological meanings, and actively worked to awaken Italians' national consciousness and desire for freedom. In The Last Letters of Jacopo Ortis, inspired by Goethe's The Sorrows of Young Werther, and the cemetery poem Sepulchres, Foscolo combined classicist themes, including the cult of antiquities, with typically Romantic sensibilities, exploring feelings such as pain, joy, passionate love, and inner torment.

Another example of cemetery poetry along the English lines is in Ippolito Pindemonte (1753–1828), permeated with a melancholic spirit. Following the model of Giuseppe Parini (1729–1799), Vincenzo Monti (1754–1828) also combines classicism with patriotism, looking to Dante and Petrarch as the founders of Italian national feeling.

As regards the legal and political reflection of the late eighteenth century, a strong link with the philosophical principles of the Italian Enlightenment was maintained (especially in Gioia and Romagnosi), although Vincenzo Cuoco (1770–1823), who examined the failure of the Neapolitan Revolution of 1799, anticipated romantic and proto-nationalist themes by referring to Giambattista Vico; he highlighted the need to defend the historical specificities of peoples, with their "customs" and traditions, against the abstract application of universal principles.

This period of transition was not limited to political or literary spheres. In the scientific realm, the discovery of galvanism — a biological electricity inherent to animals, experimented with by Luigi Galvani (1737–1798) and popularized across Europe by his nephew Giovanni Aldini (1762–1834) — opened a new avenue of investigation into the possibility of deeply penetrating the secrets and hidden forces of life.

== The literary debate on Romanticism ==
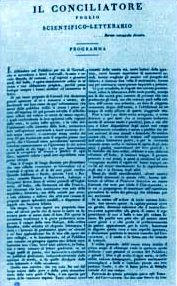
Page from Il Conciliatore

A controversy between classicists and romantics broke out in January 1816, the date on which Italian Romanticism is usually officially begun, when the French writer Madame de Staël published in Milan, on the magazine Biblioteca Italiana, her article On the manner and utility of translations, in which she invited Italians to know and translate foreign literatures as a means of renewing their own culture.

Young intellectuals such as Pietro Borsieri (1788–1852), Giovanni Berchet (1783–1851), Ludovico di Breme (1780–1820), firmly sided with the romantic renewal advocated by Staël, while others such as Pietro Giordani remained faithful to the principles of classicism.

Berchet wrote a pamphlet entitled Grisostom's Semi-Serious Letter to His Son, considered the manifesto of Italian Romanticism, for which true poetry springs from the popular spirit. Di Breme defined Romanticism as «the liberation of the soul from the constraints of old forms and as a creative impulse»; he was among the founders of a new liberal magazine, Il Conciliatore, organ of romantic school established in 1818 at Milan, whose members included, in addition to Borsieri, Berchet, di Breme, Silvio Pellico, Tommaso Grossi, Maroncelli, Scalvini, Confalonieri, Lambertenghi, Romagnosi, but their activity was nipped in the bud by Austrian censorship, which imprisoned many of them or forced them into exile.

The experience of the Conciliatore, which was addressed to the most progressive bourgeoisie and aimed to involve italian people in the diffusion of romantic sentiment and patriotic ideals, was taken up in Florence by the journal L'Antologia (1821–1833), founded by Giovan Pietro Vieusseux and Gino Capponi; in Naples by Giuseppe Ricciardi's Il Progresso (1832–1847), which Baldacchini and Cagnazzi collaborated on.

Meanwhile, the uprisings of the Risorgimento following the Restoration of Conservative Order were already spreading across the peninsula, and to these tensions Italian Romantic literature would prove closely linked. More than any other form of literature, Romanticism was committed to the construction of a national identity. At least in the first half of the nineteenth century, it was less concerned with defining strategies of struggle and institutional forms of government, and more focused on moralistic, humanitarian, and pedagogical aims.

=== Manzoni and Leopardi ===
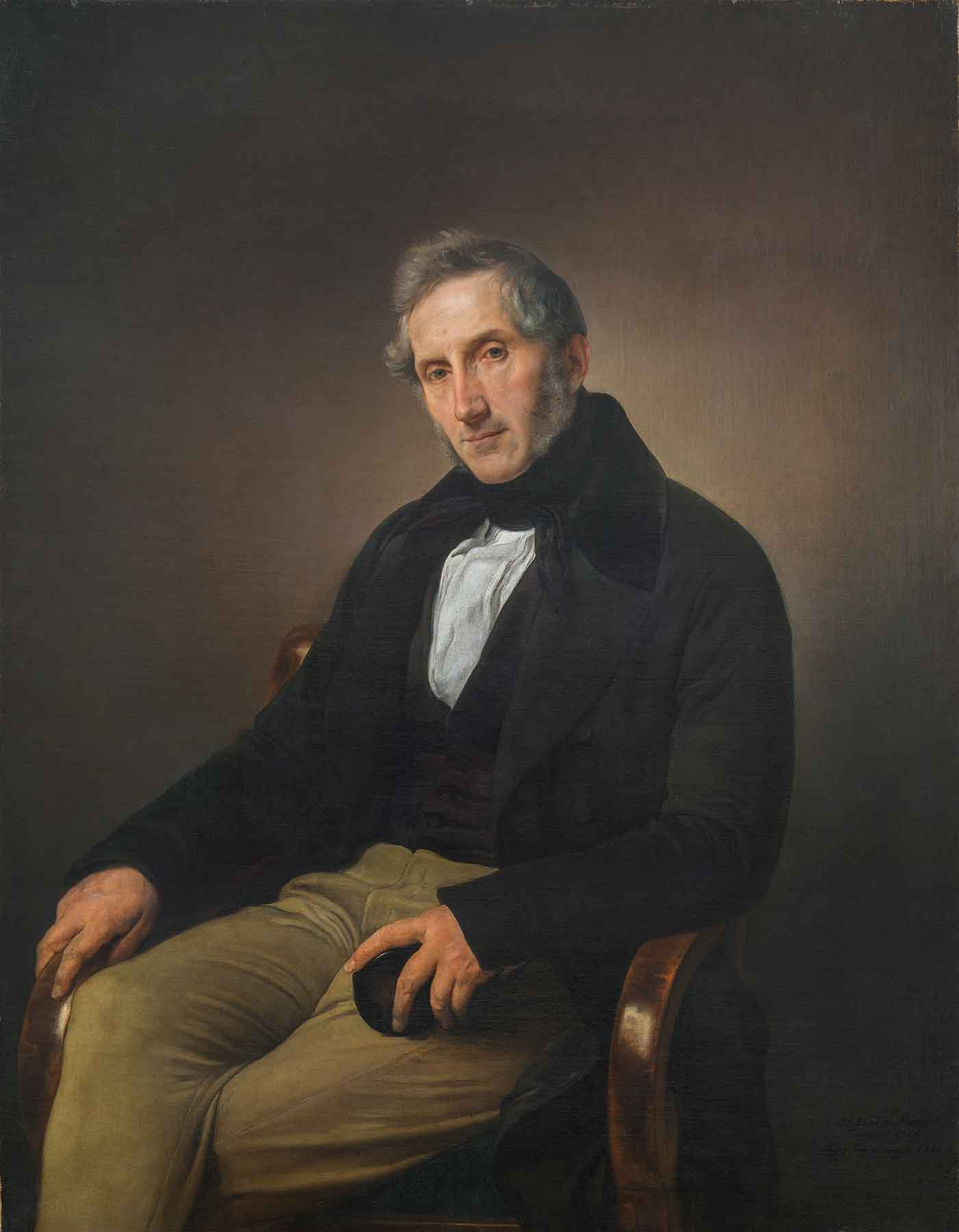
Portrait of Alessandro Manzoni by Francesco Hayez (Pinacoteca di Brera)

The main instigator of a national redemption was Alessandro Manzoni (1785–1873). He formulated the objects of the new Romantic school, saying that it aspired to try to discover and express "the true historian" and "the moral truth", not only as an end, but as the widest and eternal source of the beautiful, against mythological-pagan "fictions". It is realism that characterizes Italian literature from Manzoni onwards.

Although starting from Enlightenment and neoclassical positions, shaped by the models of Giuseppe Parini and Cesare Beccaria, he developed his own personal vision of Romanticism, influenced by his religious conversion to the Catholic faith and by his conception of history as marked by Divine Providence.

Hid historical novel The Betrothed (I promessi sposi) is the work that has made him immortal. The idea of the historical novel came to him from Sir Walter Scott, but he succeeded in something more than an historical novel in the narrow meaning of that word; he created an eminently realistic work of art.

So The Betrothed is generally ranked among the masterpieces of world literature. The novel is also a symbol of the Italian Risorgimento, both for its patriotic message and because it was a fundamental milestone in the development of the modern, unified Italian language, understandable by both scholars and common people.

In it, Manzoni dives down into the recesses of the human heart, and draws the most subtle psychological reality. In this his greatness lies, which was recognized by his companion in genius, Goethe. As a poet he had gleams of genius, especially in the Napoleonic ode, The Fifth of May, human affection is described, as in some stanzas, Hymns, and in the chorus of the Adelchi. But it is on the Bethored alone that his fame now rests.

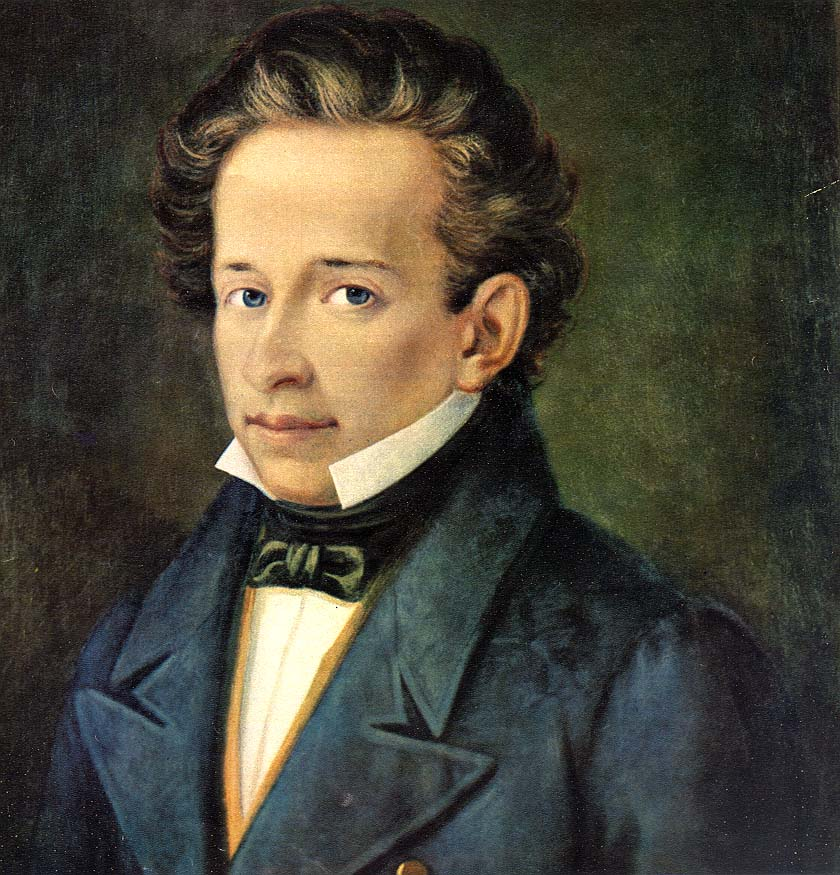
Portrait of Giacomo Leopardi by Stanislao Ferrazzi

The great poet of the age was Giacomo Leopardi (1798–1837), born thirteen years after Manzoni at Recanati, of a patrician family, bigoted and avaricious. He became so familiar with Greek authors that he used afterwards to say that the Greek mode of thought was more clear and living to his mind than the Latin or even the Italian. Solitude, sickness, domestic tyranny, prepared him for profound melancholy. From this he passed into complete religious scepticism, from which he sought rest in art.

Besides being a renowned poet of nature and of sorrow, he was also a prose writer. In his Operette morali (Small Moral Works), dialogues and discourses that indict human destinies, the clearness of style, the simplicity of language and depth of conception are characteristic of his style and place in the Italian literary canon.

He is widely seen as one of the most radical and challenging thinkers of the 19th century Although he was educated in the Enlightenment culture, he highlights its negative and destructive aspects, and despite his pessimistic materialism he maintains a paradoxical relationship with Platonism, which does not cancel but rather exalts the «eternal mystery/ of our being», reaching an unconscious harmony with German Romanticism, even though he has nothing in common with Idealism.

=== Patriotic and political literature ===
Manzoni's pedagogical realism inspired the spread of the historical novel, which included works by Massimo d'Azeglio (Ettore Fieramosca), Tommaso Grossi (Marco Visconti), Cesare Cantù (Margherita Pusterla), Giovanni Ruffini (Doctor Antonio), Silvio Pellico, Luigi Capranica, Niccolò Tommaseo and others. Their novels conveyed patriotic ideals behind events set in the distant past, especially the Middle Ages, to circumvent Austrian censorship.

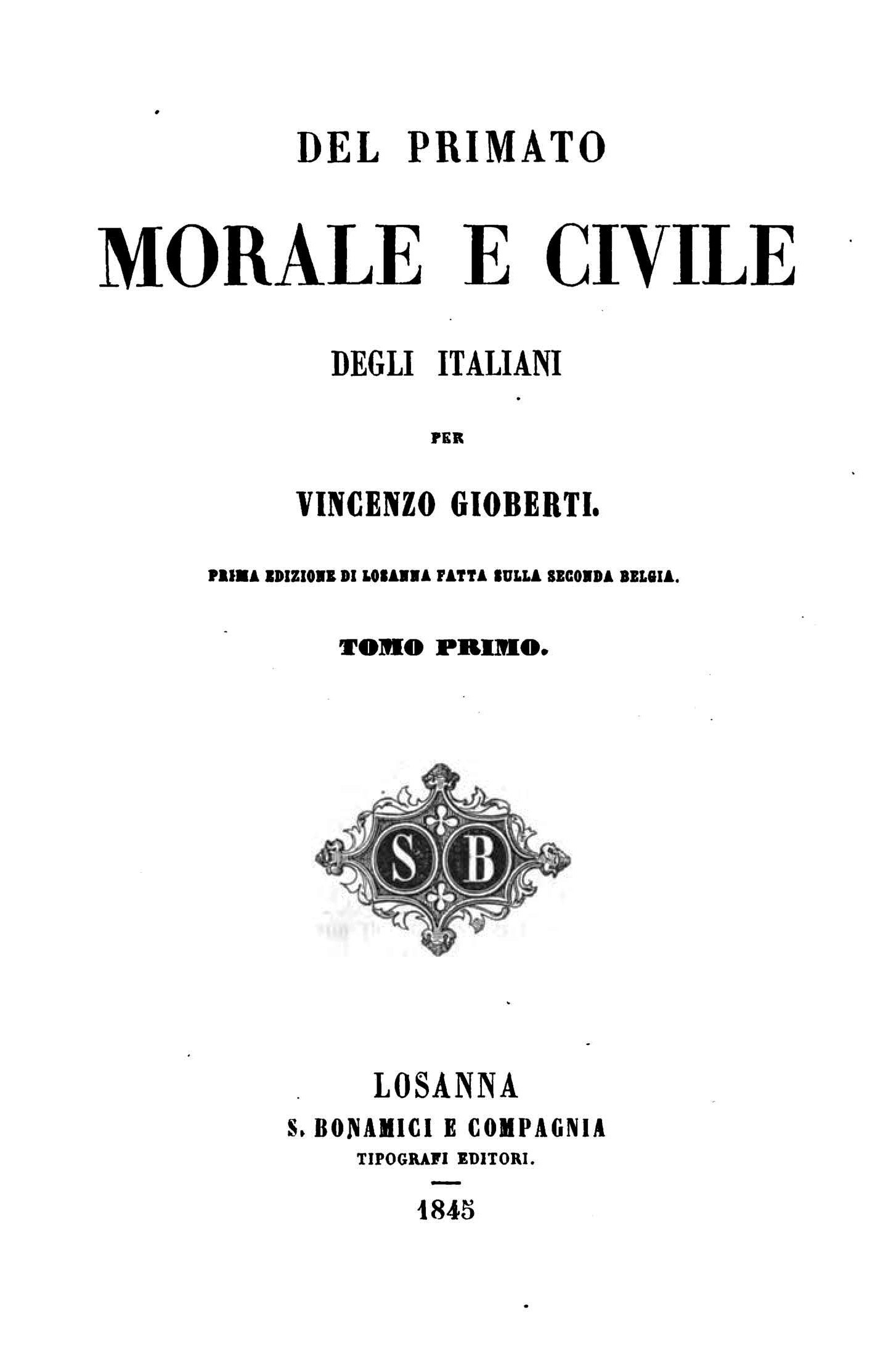
Moral and civil Primacy of Italians, in which Gioberti defended the moral supremacy of Italy as a «princely nation».

But after 1840, even history returned to its spirit of learned research, from the manner of Botta and Colletta, as is shown in such works as the Archivio storico italiano, established at Florence by Giovan Pietro Vieusseux (a continuation of his Antologia, which was suppressed in 1833 owing to the action of the Austrian government), the History of Italy in the Middle Ages by Carlo Troya, a remarkable treatise by Manzoni himself (On Some Points of Lombard History in Italy), and the fine history of the Sicilian Vespers by Michele Amari.

The literary movement that preceded and was contemporary with the political revolution of 1848 may be said to be represented by four writers: Giuseppe Giusti (1809–1850), Francesco Domenico Guerrazzi (1804–1873), Vincenzo Gioberti (1801–1852) and Cesare Balbo (1789–1853). Giusti wrote epigrammatic satires in popular language. Guerrazzi had a great reputation and great influence, but his historical novels, though avidly read before 1848, were soon forgotten. Gioberti was a powerful polemical writer; his Moral and civil Primacy of Italians will last as an important document of the times, manifesto of Neo-Guelphism which recalling the medieval Guelphs outlined the goal of a national federation of the various Italian states, of which Catholic universalism would be the religion that defined Italian identity, since «Italy is the most cosmopolitan of nations». Like Gioberti in his early years, Balbo was zealous for a civil papacy and a federation of Italian states, but presided over by the House of Savoy; his Summary of the History of Italy is an excellent example.

By contrast, Giusti and Guerrazzi called themselves neo-Ghibellines, personified also by Pepe, Cattaneo, Ferrari, Sismondi, La Farina, and the playwright Giovanni Battista Niccolini (1782–1861). Patriotic literature was still expressed in the novel Confessions of an Italian by Ippolito Nievo (1831–1861), about the exploits of Giuseppe Garibaldi's Thousand. Late Romanticism was represented, among others, by Francesco Dall'Ongaro, Giovanni Prati, Aleardo Aleardi.

== Philosophical spiritualism and historicism ==
In philosophy, Italian Romanticism saw the development of various currents pervaded by a spiritualism contiguous to that which in France had found its first theoretician in Victor Cousin. In Italy too, particular attention was paid to the religious, moral and transcendent dimension, always linked to patriotic themes and the valorization of national identity, in opposition to the Enlightenment materialism.

Joseph De Maistre (1753–1821), a French-speaking Savoyard thinker who had a significant influence on Italian conservative catholic thought, had already defended authority, tradition and the Catholic religion as the foundations of society, opposing French revolutionary ideas. A key figure of the Counter-Enlightenment, he advocated a radical pessimism about human nature, tempered by a providential view of history, and developed a political theology based on the "throne and altar" duality, that is, on the divine right of kings.

The subsequent penetration of European and German Romanticism brought other philosophical impulses, albeit more liberal in tone. Kantian philosophy was initially assimilated by the Neapolitans Pasquale Galluppi (1770–1846) and Ottavio Colecchi (1773–1847), but a profound re-elaboration of it was made by Antonio Rosmini (1797–1855), father of Italian Idealism, who rejected sensism of Gioia and Romagnosi, and laid the foundations for the ethical spiritualism that would characterize the various philosophical movements aiming at Unification of Italy.

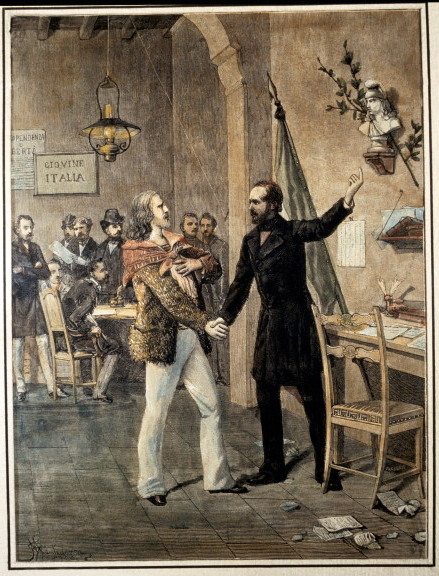
Garibaldi's adherence to Mazzinian Ideals of Young Italy (Risorgimento Museum, Turin)

Rosmini along with Vincenzo Gioberti are considered the main spokesmans of liberal Catholicism: both took up the Augustinian neoplatonic themes of the interiority of conscience and divine illumination, but the former aspired to a religious reform oriented toward the transcendence, the latter more oriented toward the recovery of the civil function of Christian tradition.

Gioberti, in fact, sought to challenge the subjectivism of modern philosophy emerging from Descartes, reaffirming the preeminence of ontology, understood in an almost pantheistic way. He affirmed the value of the Italian philosophical tradition, which encompassed the Pythagorean, Patristic, and Scholastic schools up to Giambattista Vico's historicism. On the other hand, he was hostile to the conservative and reactionary traits that he saw embodied in the Jesuits.

Giuseppe Mazzini instead experimented Romantic Spiritualism with revolutionary and anticlerical overtones, as well as pedagogical ones, inspired by a syncretic vision of politics and religion in the supreme service of the nation. Driven by a strong idealistic strain, on which he based his Young Italy and Young Europe, Mazzinism conceived of God as an immanent force in history, which translates into the moral duty of peoples to act collectively for freedom, progress, and democracy, in order to fulfill the mission entrusted to them.

German idealism was more widely received in southern Italy. In the Kingdom of Naples a neo-Hegelian school was formed, whose major representatives were: Augusto Vera (1813–1885), a religious interpreter of Hegel's Science of Logic; Francesco de Sanctis (1817–1883), who saw the most significant ferments of European romanticism to be expressed by Hegelian aesthetics, according to which Art was «the sensitive appearance of the Idea», and from which he intended to draw inspiration for the construction of an heroic and "Alfierian" morality; Bertrando Spaventa (1817–1883), promoter of a renewed «Italian philosophy», who reformed Hegelian dialectics within the framework of Kant's transcendental self-consciousness, introducing other original themes from the indigenous Italian tradition, such as historicism. In this way Spaventa intended to demonstrate how modern philosophy, both secular and idealistic, was born in Italy with the Renaissance authors Bruno, Campanella and Vico, and then, due to the obstacles of the Counter-Reformation, it went on to fertilize the thought of the other side of the Alps.

The season of Italian idealism of Croce and Gentile would take its cue in the following century from this romantic spiritualism.

== Visual art ==
Concurrently with European artistic Romanticism, purism began to develop in Italy, inspired by the German Nazarenes. However, a specific current of Romanticism also took root here, the so-called "historical Romanticism," which focused on historical-patriotic themes. Its greatest exponent was Francesco Hayez (1791–1882), influenced by Tiepolo and other masters of the late Baroque. Along with him, who worked mainly in Lombardy-Venetia, the major painters of this current were Giuseppe Bezzuoli (1784–1855) in Tuscany, and Francesco Podesti (1800–1895) in Papal States.

"Historical Romanticism" paintings tend to depict subjects from the past, mostly reminiscent of the Italian Middle Ages, in an attempt to reproduce situations similar to that so-called "vulgar Era", considered to be formative of Italian traditions and popular folklore (exactly as Manzoni did in Adelchi). Hayez's repertoire also includes portraits of famous people of his time, from the aforementioned Alessandro Manzoni to Garibaldi and Camillo Benso di Cavour. His best-known painting, entitled The Kiss (1859), depicts a man about to go into battle for his country, who dedicates a passionate and sincere kiss to his beloved: underlining the primacy of sentiment, it resonates with the ideals of Italian unification and of political-military commitment.

Pelagio Palagi, Baldassare Verazzi, Eliseo Sala, Carlo Arienti, Amos Cassioli, also belong to the civil painting with historical subjects. In Giovanni Carnovali there are more intimate mythological scenes, while in the romantic art of Palermo the Arab-Norman Middle Ages of Sicily are rediscovered.

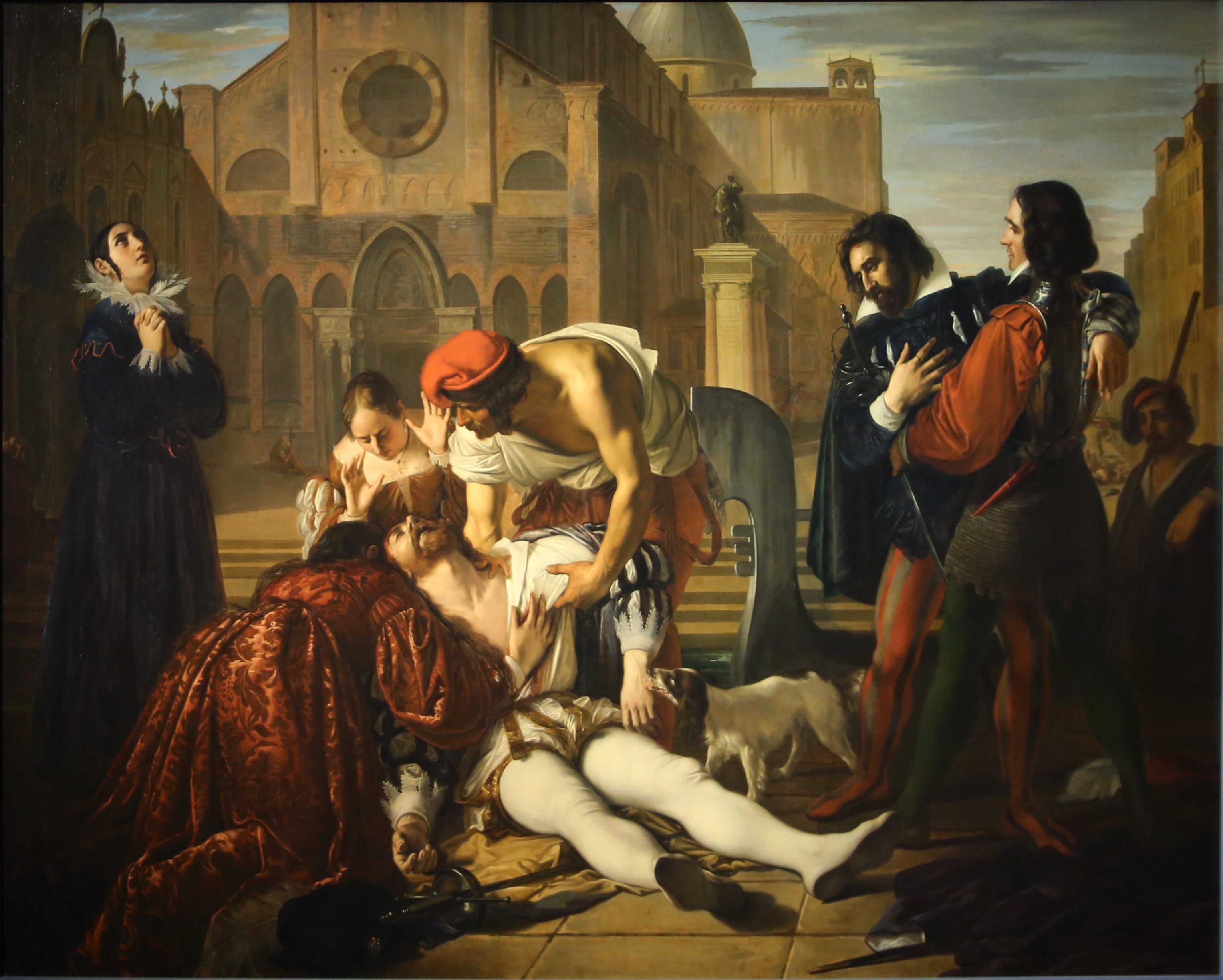
Lorenzino de' Medici dies stabbed in Venice, by Giuseppe Bezzuoli (1840)

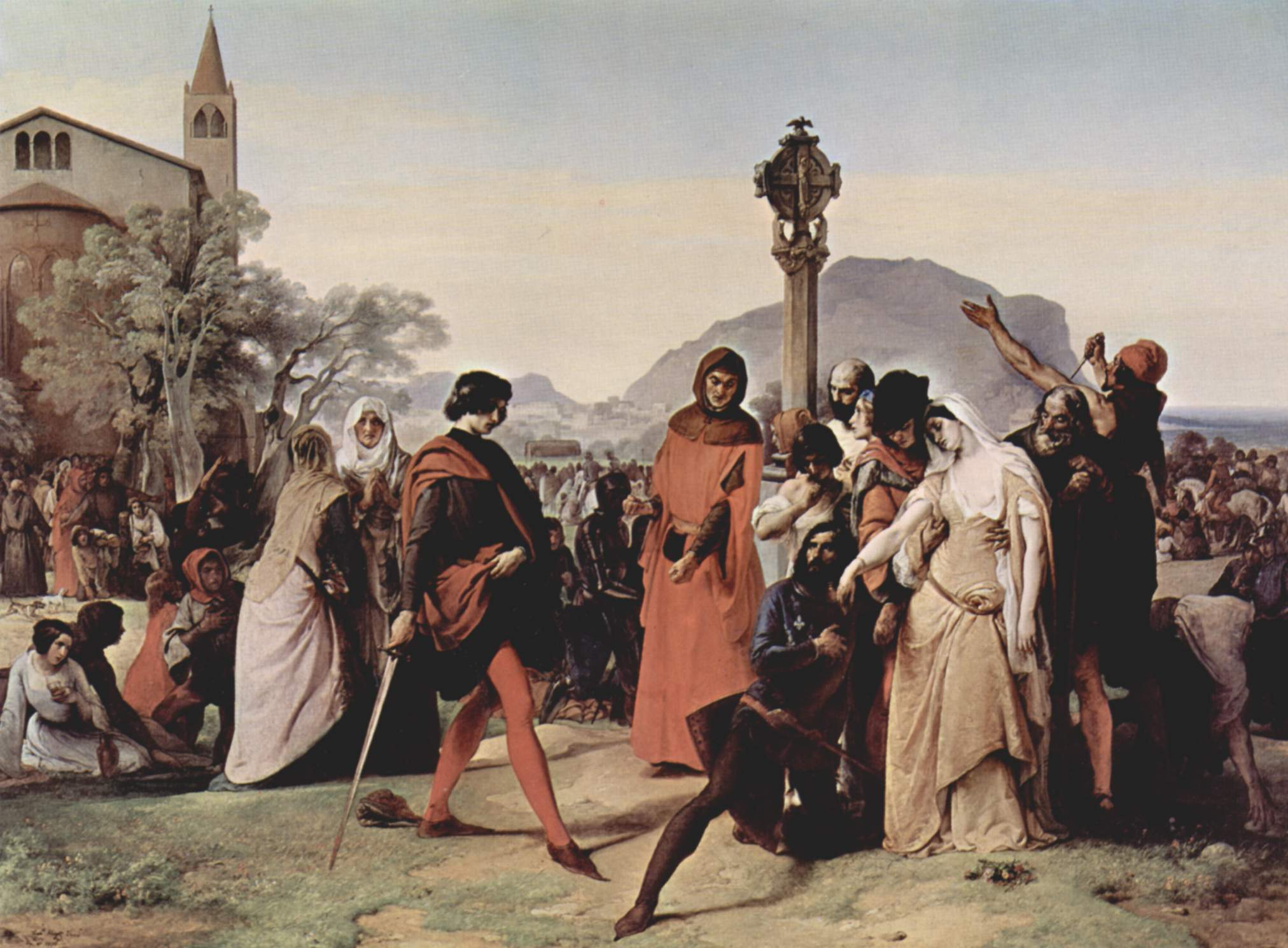
The Sicilian Vespers, by Francesco Hayez (1846)

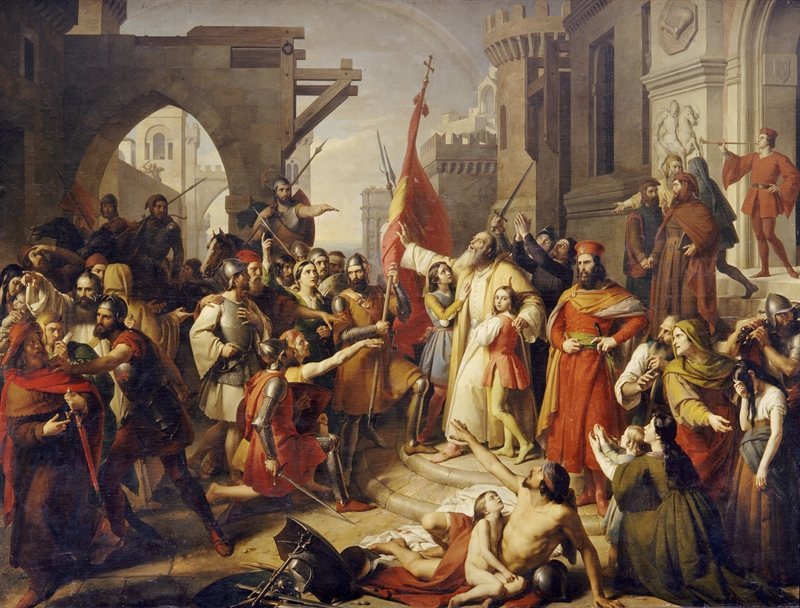
The Oath of the Anconetani, by Francesco Podesti (1855)

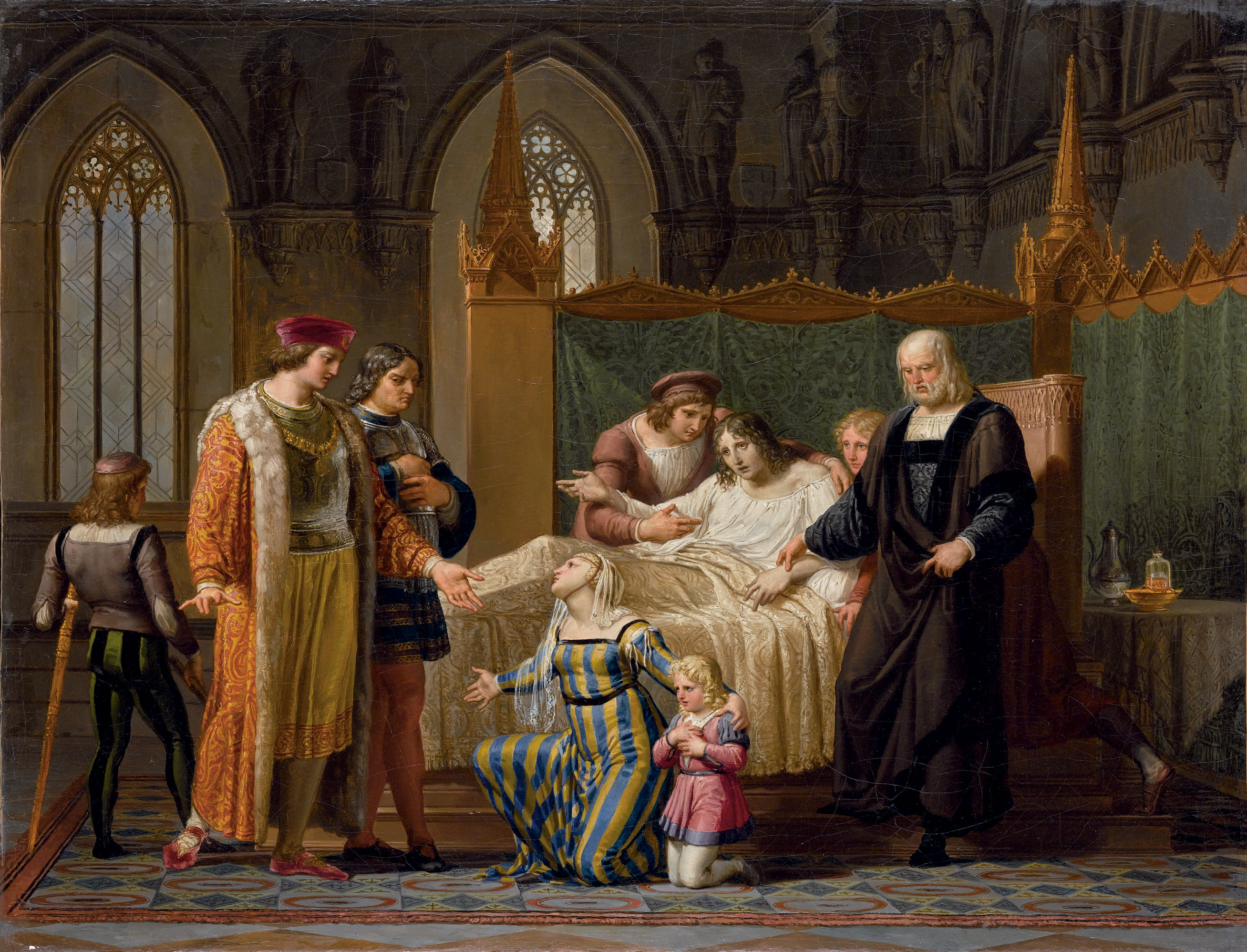
Charles VIII meets Gian Galeazzo Sforza in Pavia, by Pelagio Palagi (1822)

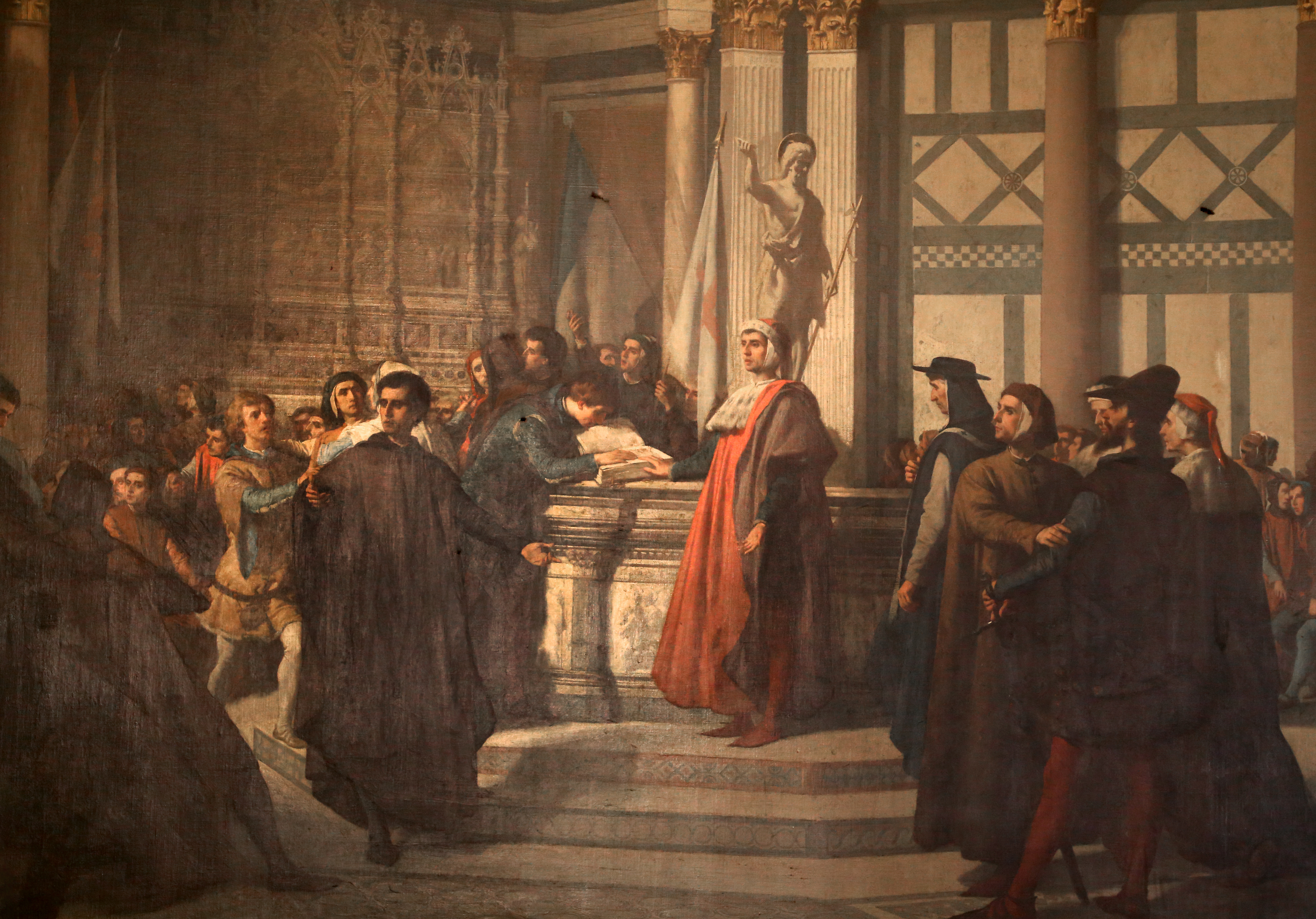
Dino Compagni preached peace among Guelphs and Ghibellines, by Antonio Puccinelli (1879)

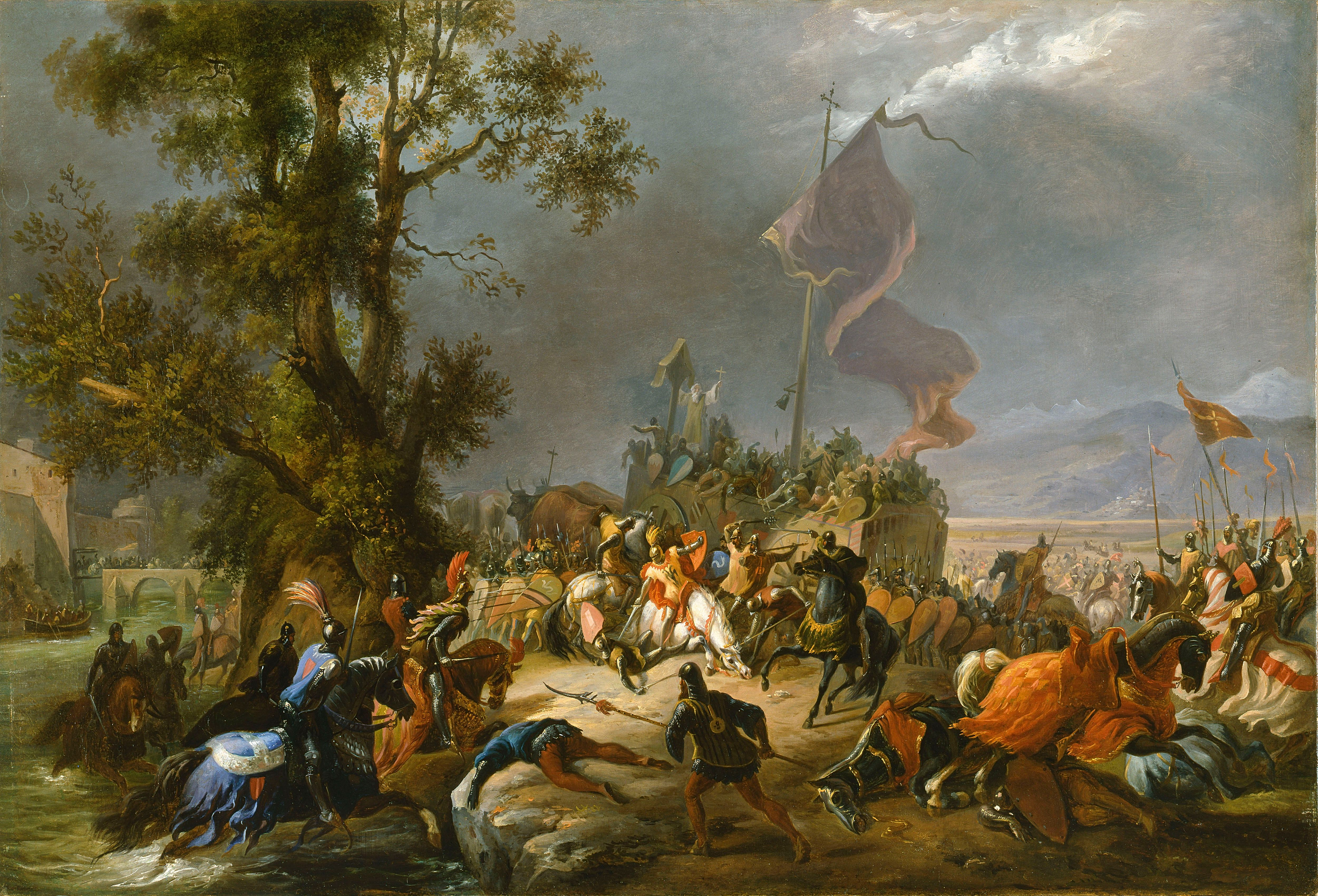
The Battle of Legnano, by Massimo d'Azeglio (1831)

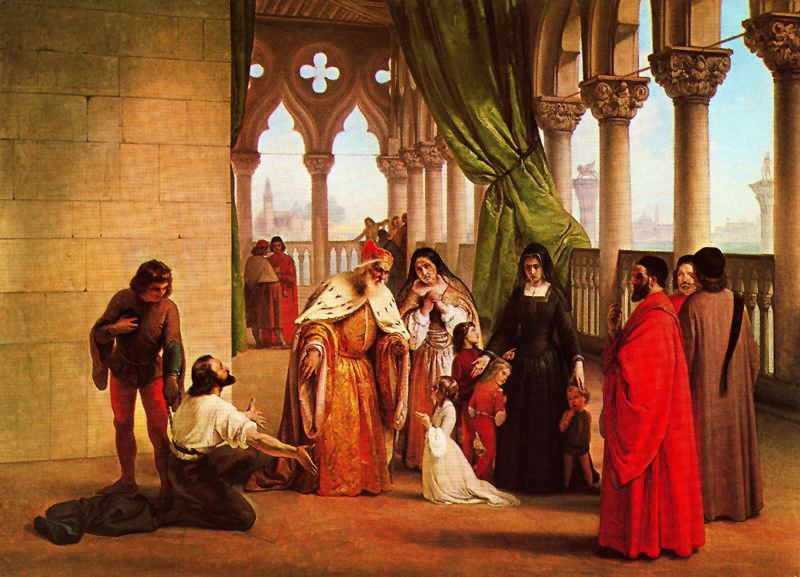
The two Foscari, by Francesco Hayez (1844)

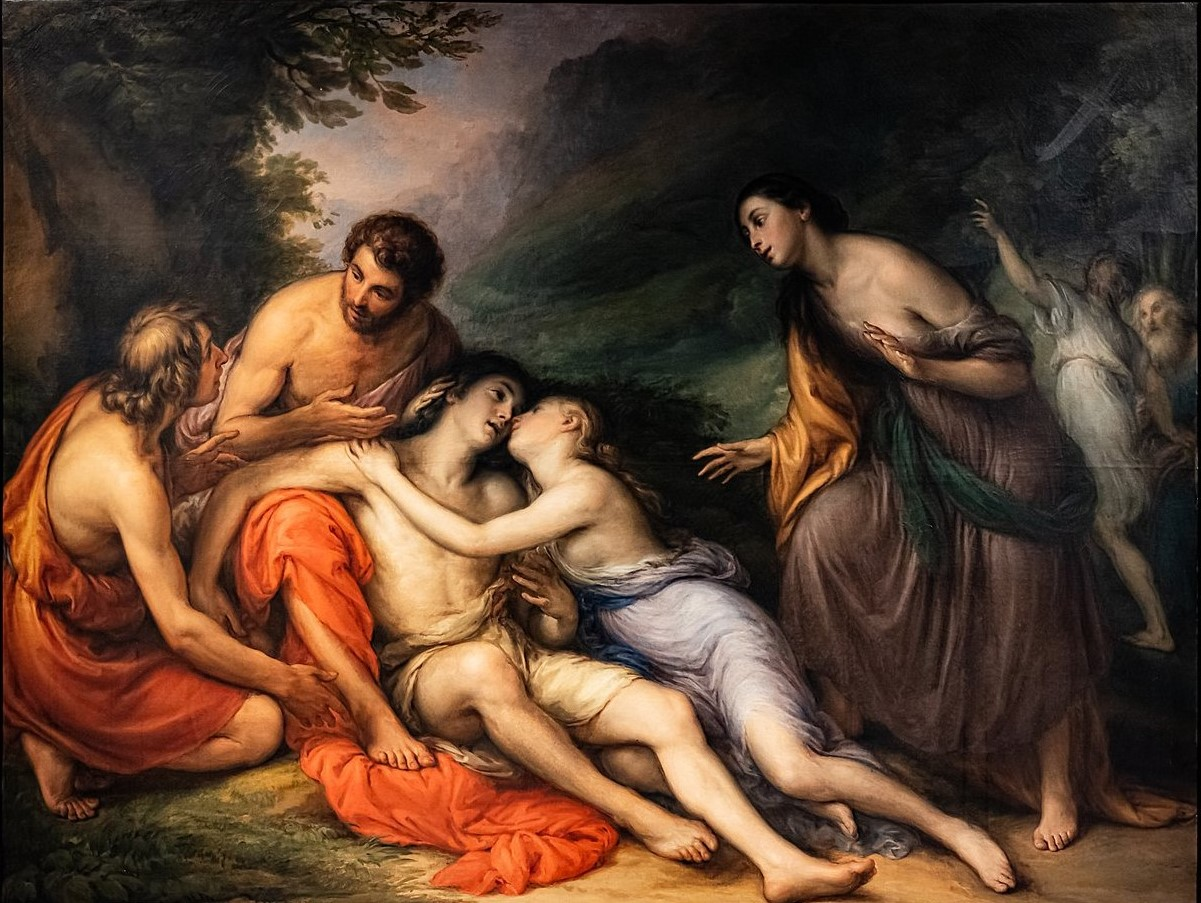
Death of Aminta, by Giovanni Carnovali (or «il Piccio») (1832)

Worthy of mention is also the landscape painting, which partly recalling the eighteenth-century veduta, offers a sentimental and lyrical representation of nature. It is found in the paintings of Giuseppe Pietro Bagetti(1764–1831), Giovanni Migliara (1785–1837), Massimo d'Azeglio (1798–1866), Antonio Fontanesi (1818–1882), Giuseppe Camino (1818–1890); around Giacinto Gigante (1806–1876), who experimented with expressions of the romantic sublime, the school of Posillipo was formed, which influenced Gabriele Smargiassi, Giuseppe and Filippo Palizzi, Teodoro Duclère. Paintings of a realistic-naturalistic nature were also those of the Palermitans Salvatore Lo Forte and Francesco Lojacono.

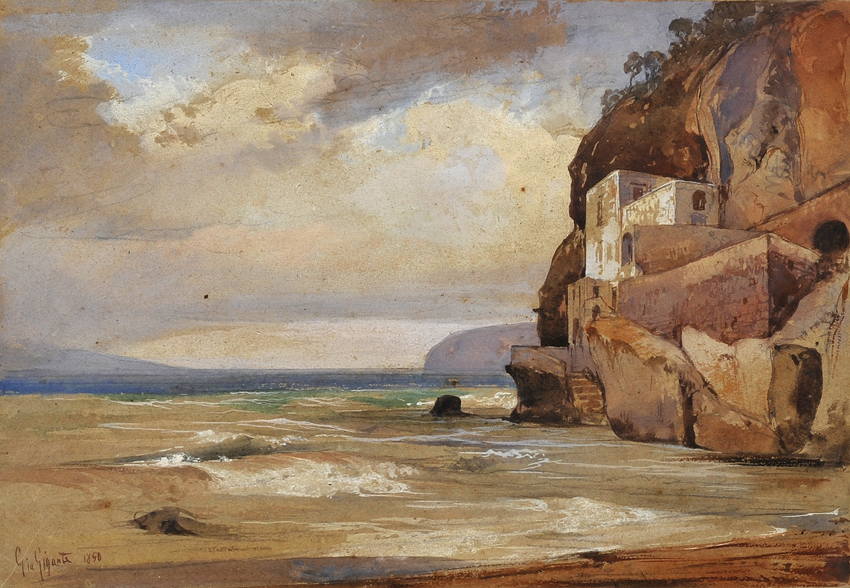
Costiera amalfitana, by Giacinto Gigante (c. 1844)

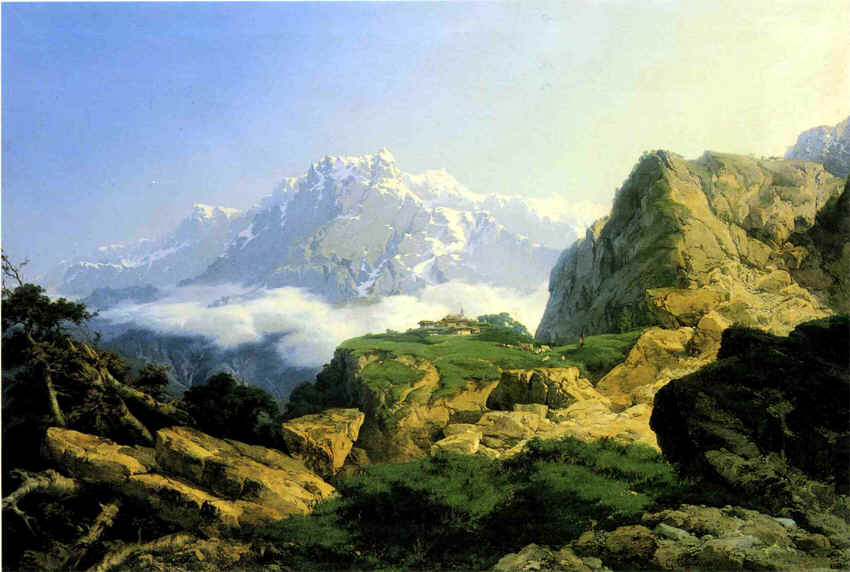
Mont Blanc, by Giuseppe Camino (c. 1870)

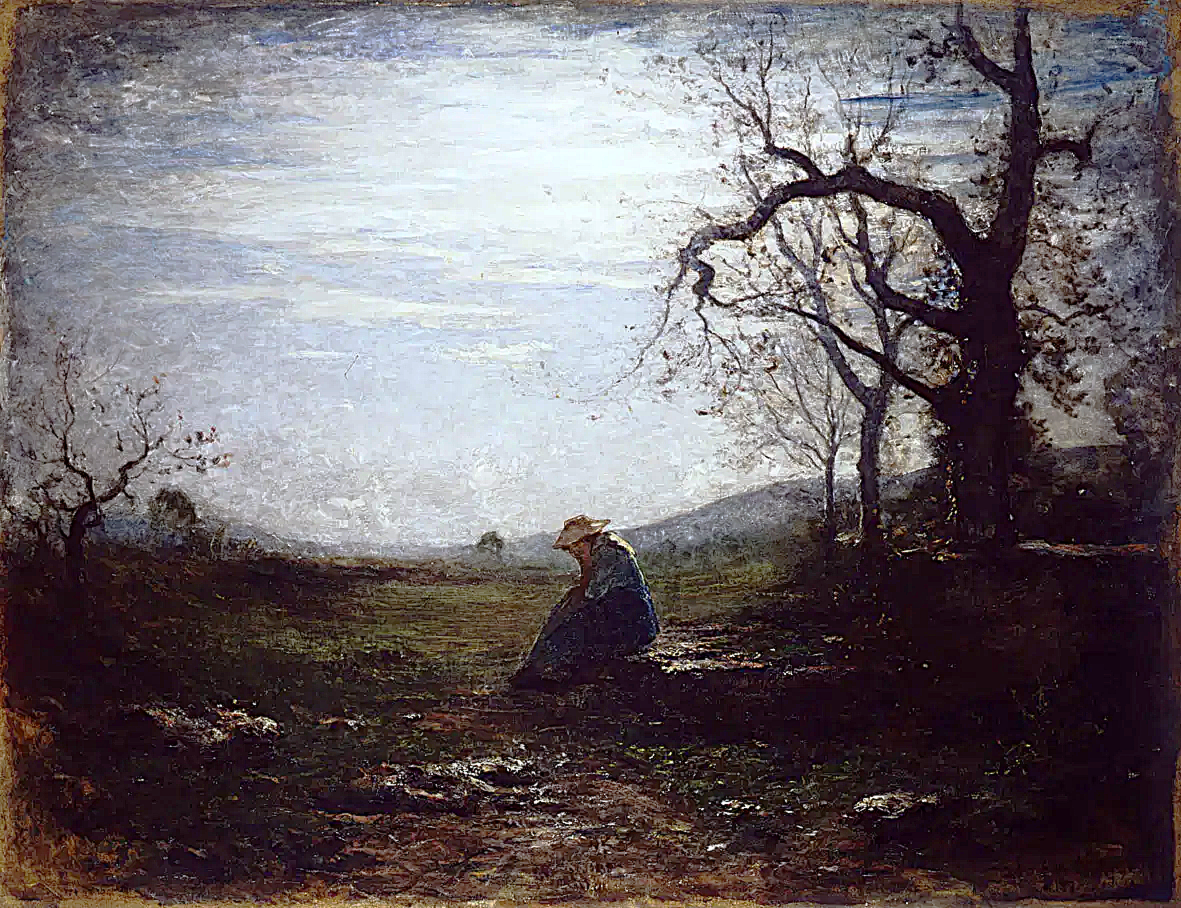
Solitude, by Antonio Fontanesi (1876)

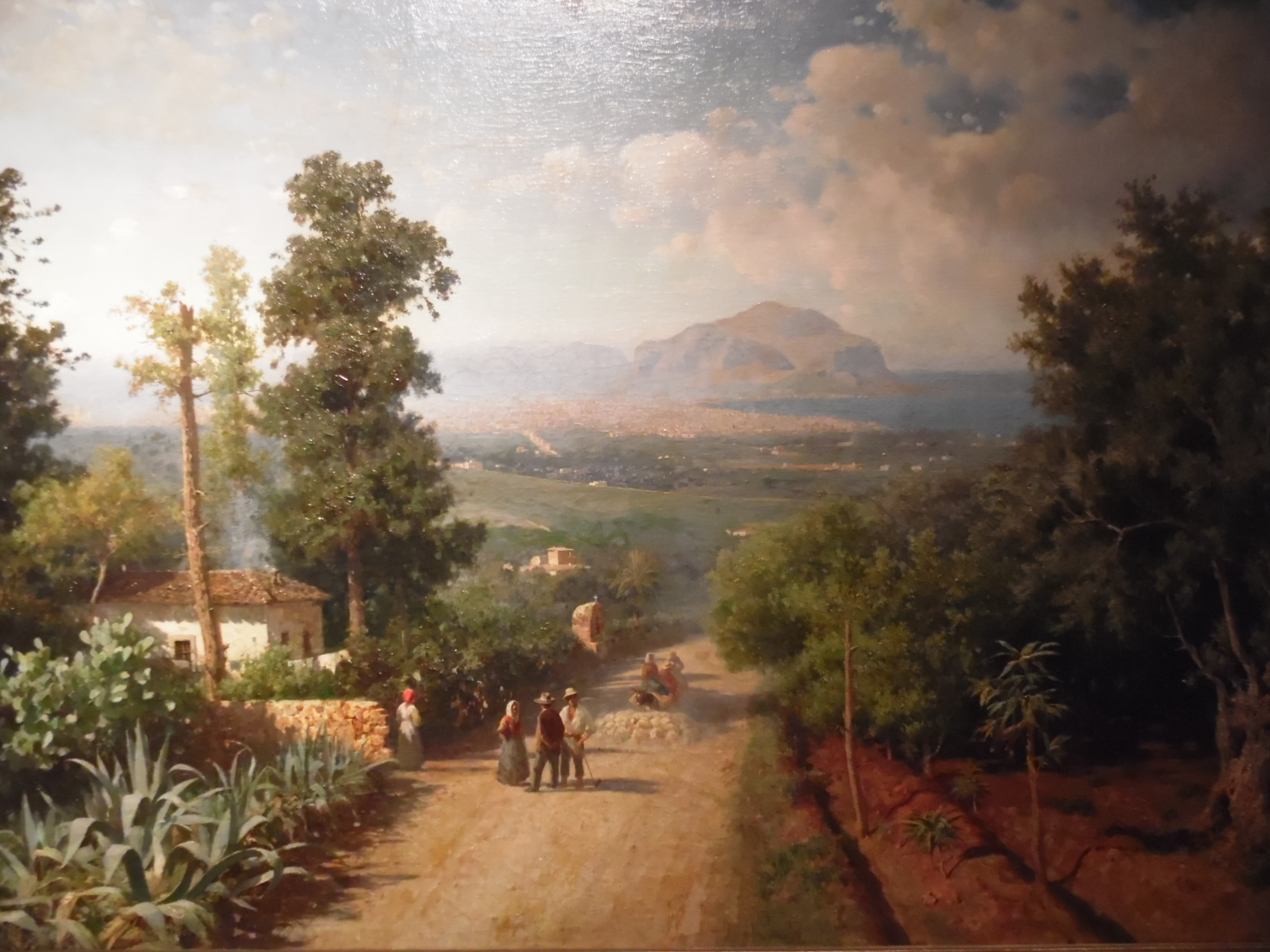
Golden Conch of Palermo, by Francesco Lojacono (1875)

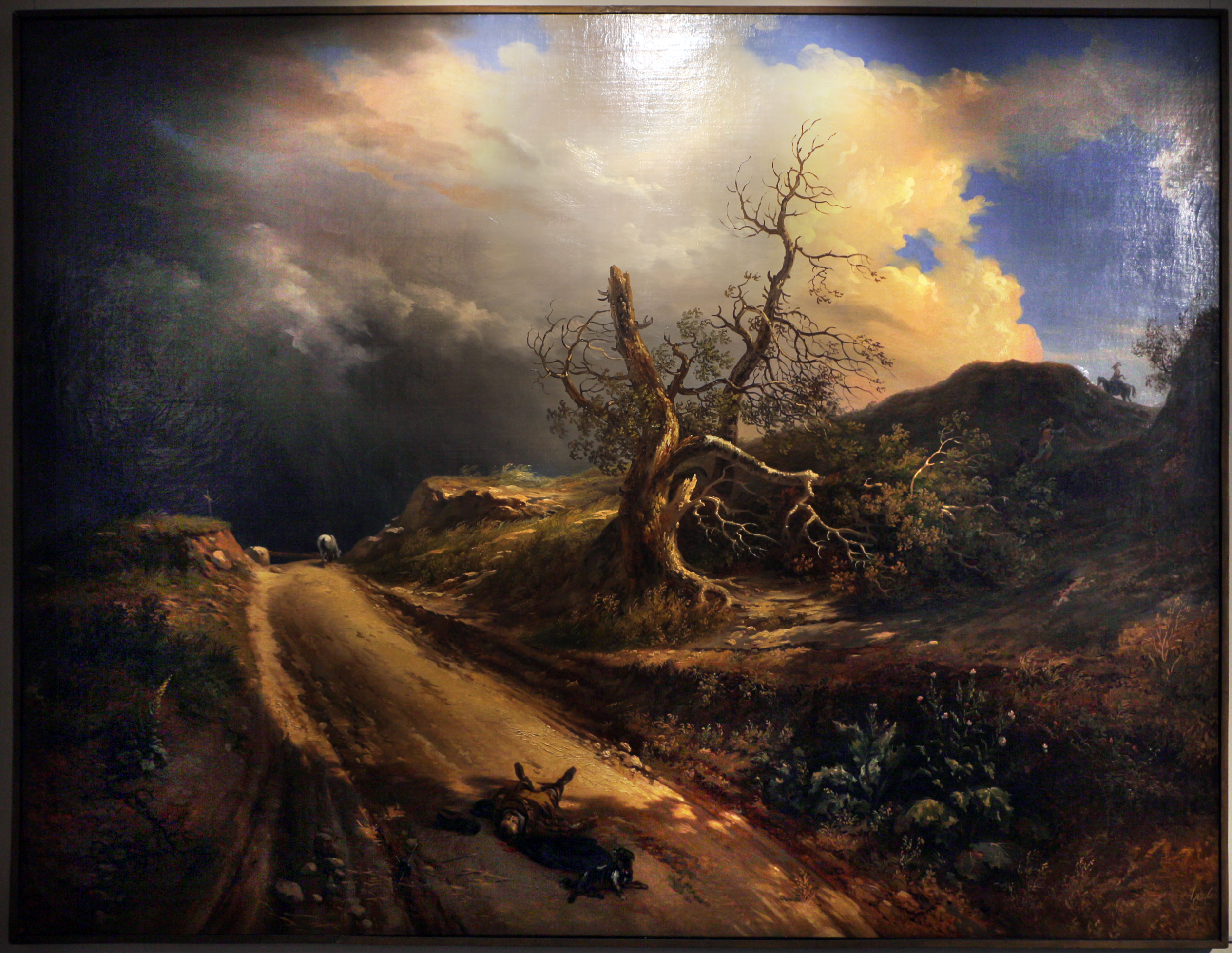
A revenge, by Massimo d'Azeglio (1835)

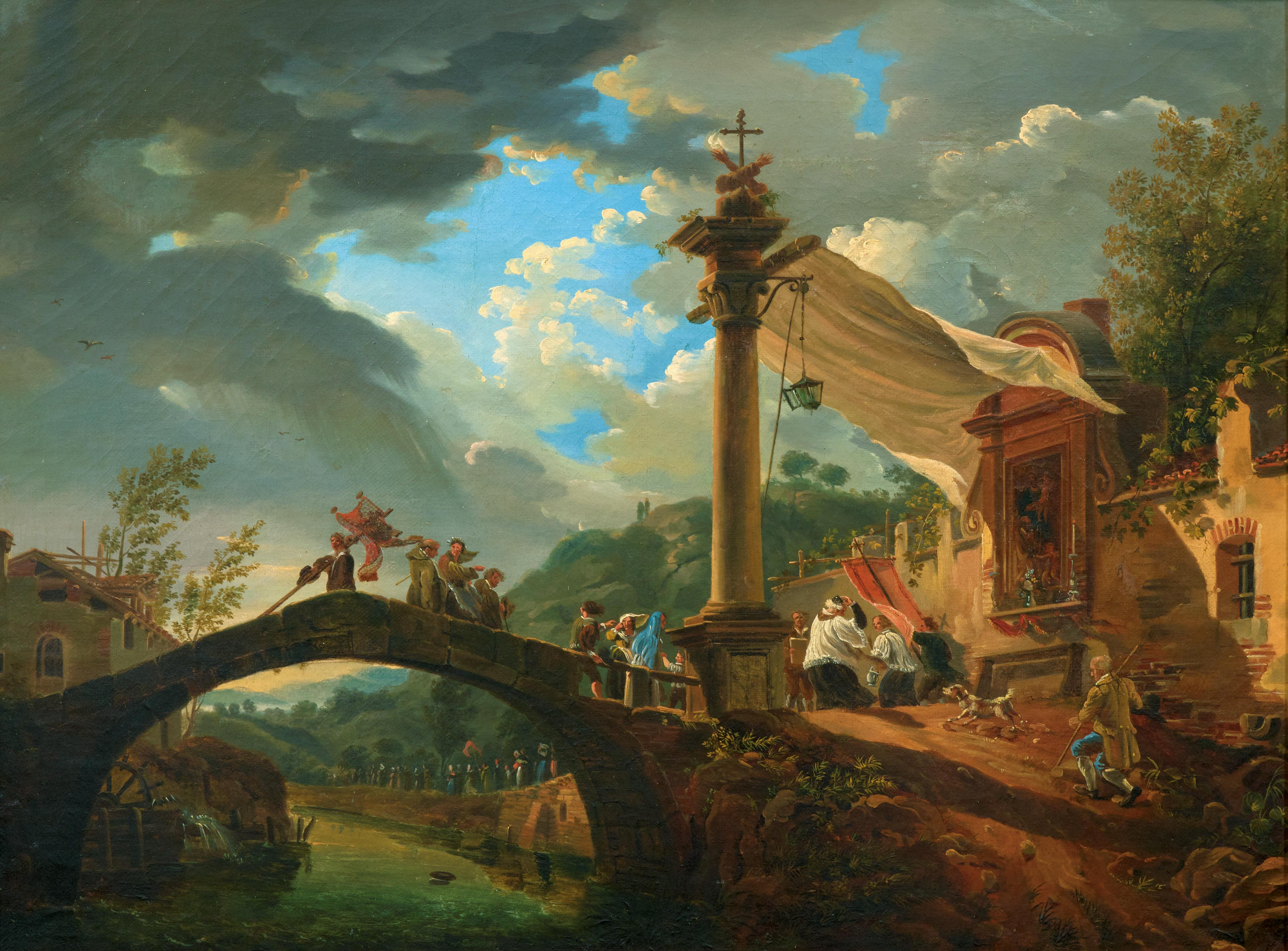
A procession interrupted by a storm, by Giovanni Migliara (c. 1830)

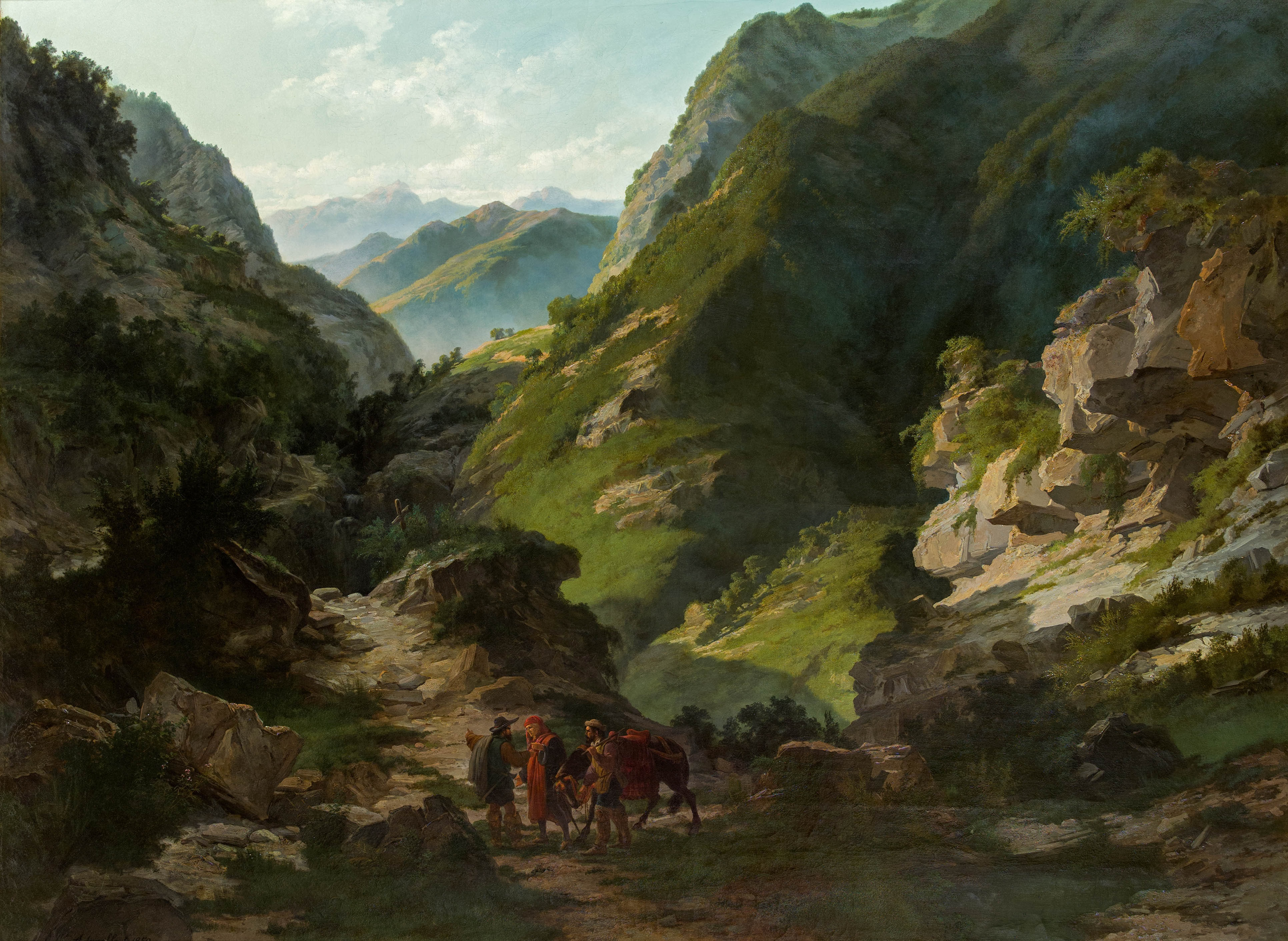
Travelers in the Mountains, by Carlo Ademollo (1850)

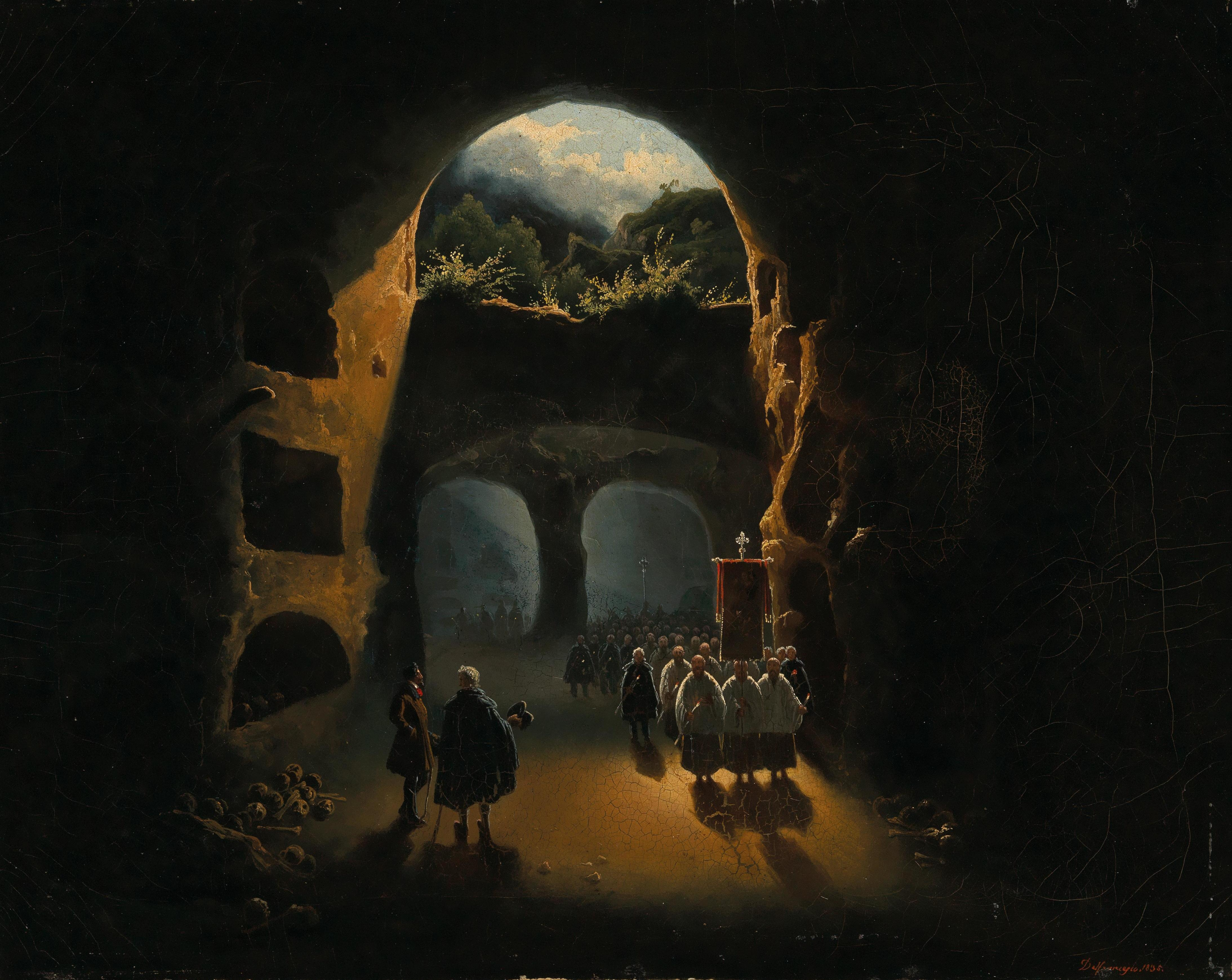
Ferdinando II in the Catacombs of S.Gennaro, by De Francesco (1835)

There is finally genre painting, which has as its subject scenes and events of daily life, sometimes of patriotic subject, which was addressed in the paintings of Domenico (1815–1878) and Gerolamo Induno (1825–1890), Luigi Sabatelli (1772–1850), Giacomo Trecourt (1812–1882), Gioacchino Toma (1836–1891), Federico Faruffini (1833–1869); this latter belonging to the Lombard Scapigliatura, which includes among others Tranquillo Cremona and Daniele Ranzoni, followers of Carnovali. Often they are also authors of portraits.

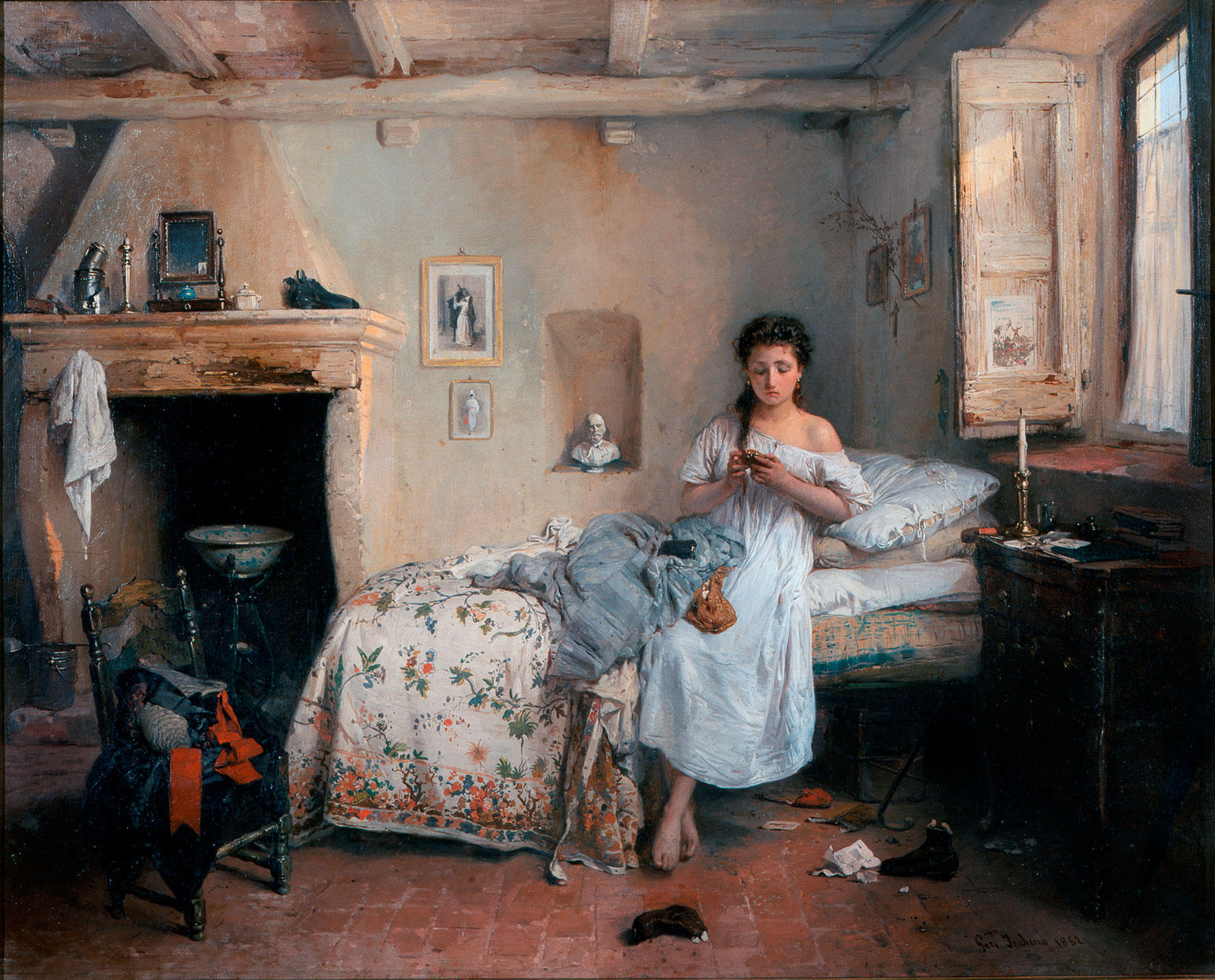
Sad feeling, by Gerolamo Induno (1862)

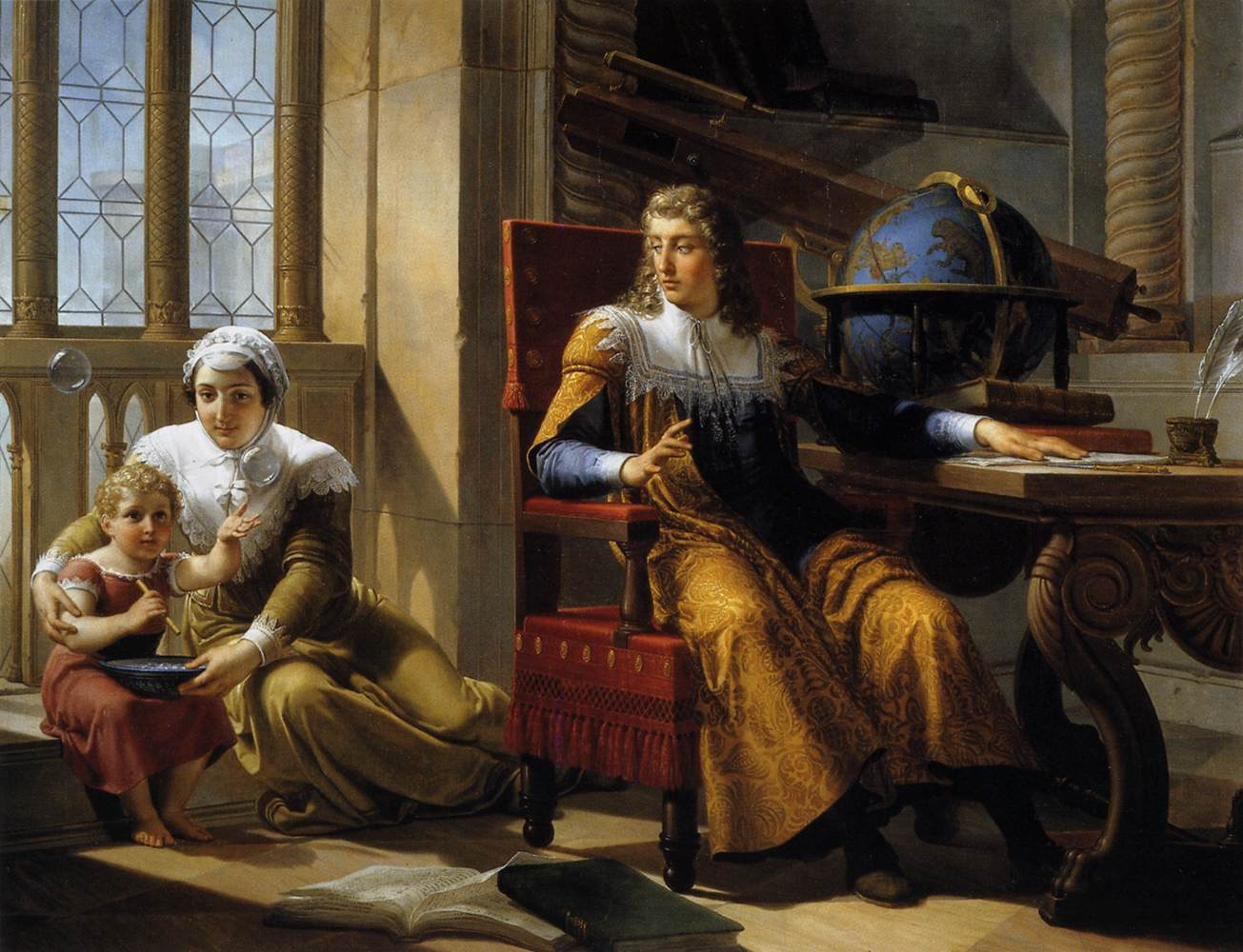
Discovery of the refraction of light by Newton, by Pelagio Palagi (1827)

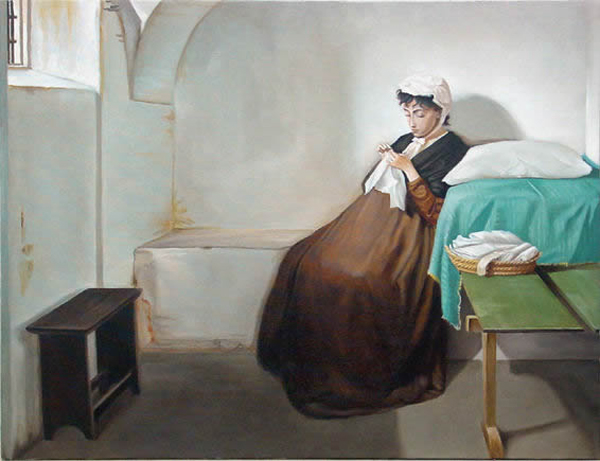
Luisa Sanfelice in prison, by Gioacchino Toma (1877)

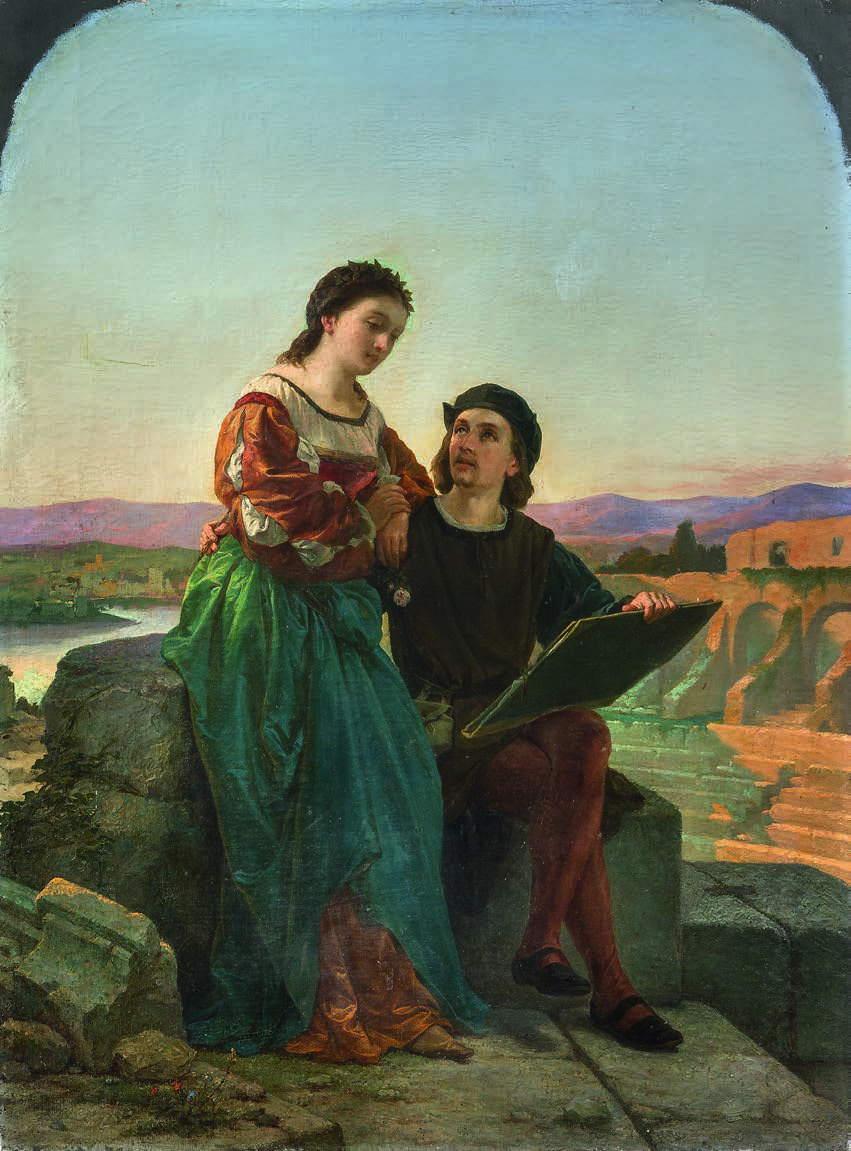
Raffaello and la Fornarina, by Faruffini (1857)

== Music ==
Romanticism in Italy was a period of particular renewal for opera, whose subjects were drawn less from mythology and classical studies than from historical themes.

The early Italian Romantic period saw the apogee of bel canto, inaugurated by Gioachino Rossini (1792–1868), who composed operas such as The Barber of Seville, Cinderella, The Thieving Magpie, William Tell. His style was adopted by his contemporaries Vincenzo Bellini (1801–1835) and Gaetano Donizetti (1797–1848). While Rossini's comic operas are today known primarily for their rousing overtures, Donizetti and Bellini predominate for their tragic content. The most important Italian instrumental composer of this period was the legendary "Devil's Violinist" Niccolò Paganini.

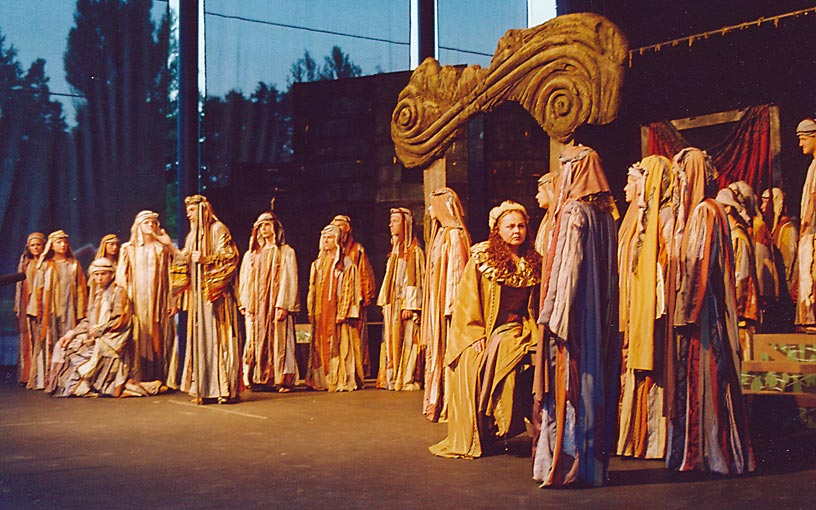
Scene from Nabucco with the famous "Va pensiero" chorus.

The face of Italian Romantic opera, however, is Giuseppe Verdi (1813–1901), whose slave chorus in Nabucco is a memorable hymn to all of Italy. Italian nationalistic aspirations were reflected in those of the Jews of the Exodus:

Italian

O mia patria sì bella e perduta.

— Words from the chorus Va pensiero
Translation:
English

Oh my homeland, so lovely and lost!

Its success at La Scala of Milan in 1842 marked a turning point in the composer's career, and helped redefine musical taste of the era, with historical-realistic elements that matched typical themes of Romanticism, such as sentiment, freedom, patriotism.

Also Verdi's trilogy formed by Rigoletto, The Troubadour and The Fallen Woman are among his major works, but he reached the peak of his art with Otello and Falstaff at the end of his career. He infused his operas with unparalleled dramatic vigor and rhythmic vitality.

Verdi followed the path of well-composed melodrama, similar to Wagner despite their differences. His immense charisma eclipsed all other Italian composers, including Amilcare Ponchielli (1834–1886) and Arrigo Boito (1842–1918), who also wrote the librettist for his last operas, Otello and Falstaff.

In the second half of the 19th century, operas by "young school" exponents, such as Mascagni's Rustic Chivalry, Leoncavallo's The Clowns, and especially those of Giacomo Puccini (1858–1924), Verdi's undisputed successor, transcended realism into verism: his La Bohème, Tosca, Madame Butterfly and Turandot are melodic operas loaded with emotion and late Romantic feeling.

== Architecture ==
Romantic architecture in Italy was also influenced by medievalism, but less widespread than in other parts of Europe. It was expressed in Romanesque Revival, Gothic Revival, exotic or eclectic styles, primarily devoted to the completion of the facades of great cathedrals, and the construction of new churches (particularly for Protestant denominations who found its "austere expressiveness" attractive).

A significant example of this architecture is the Gothic façade of Santa Croce in Florence, which became a sort of national temple, already celebrated as Hall of Fame by Ugo Foscolo, being the burial place of illustrious authors, artists, and intellectuals in Italian history.

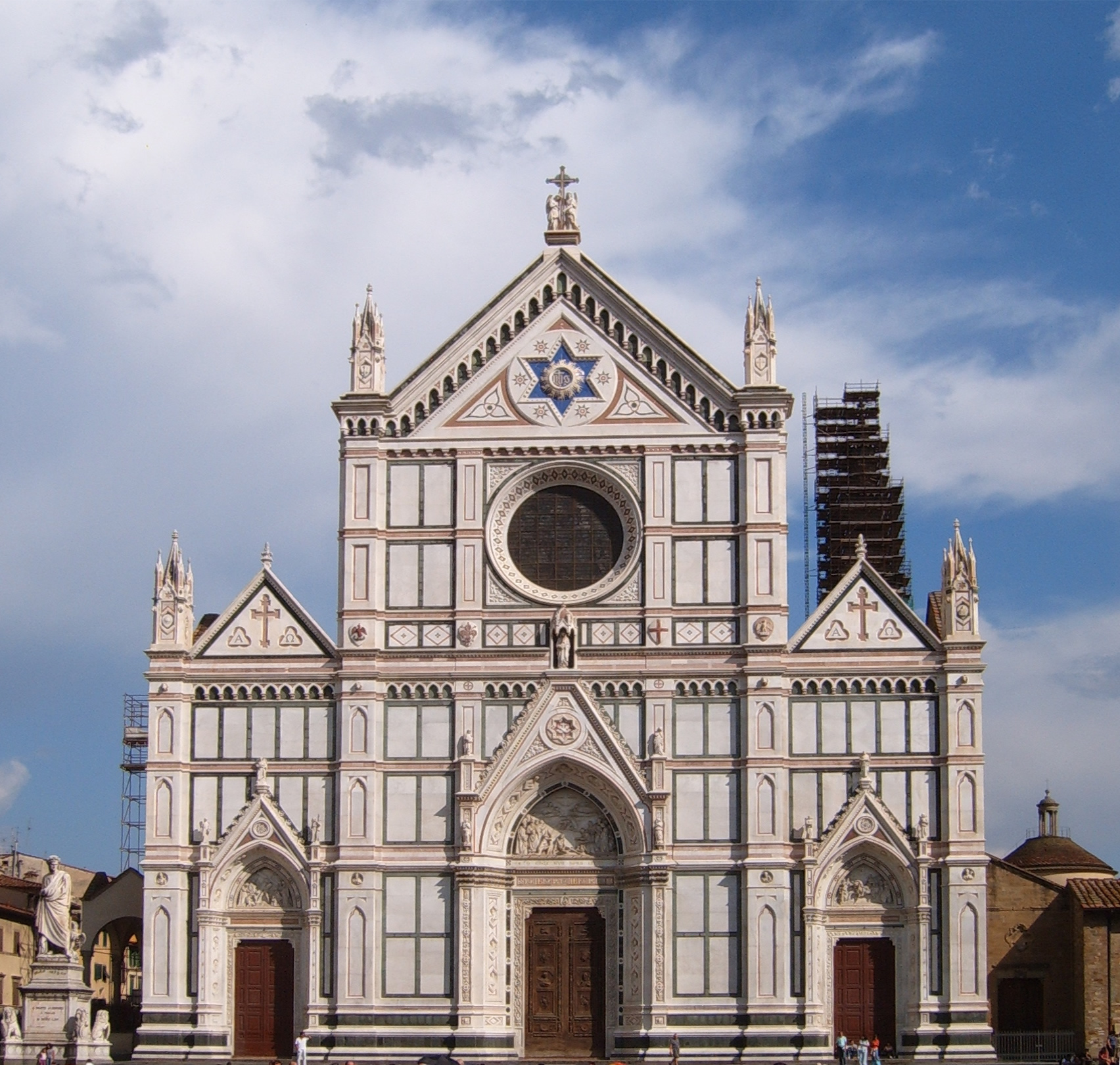
Santa Croce, Florence

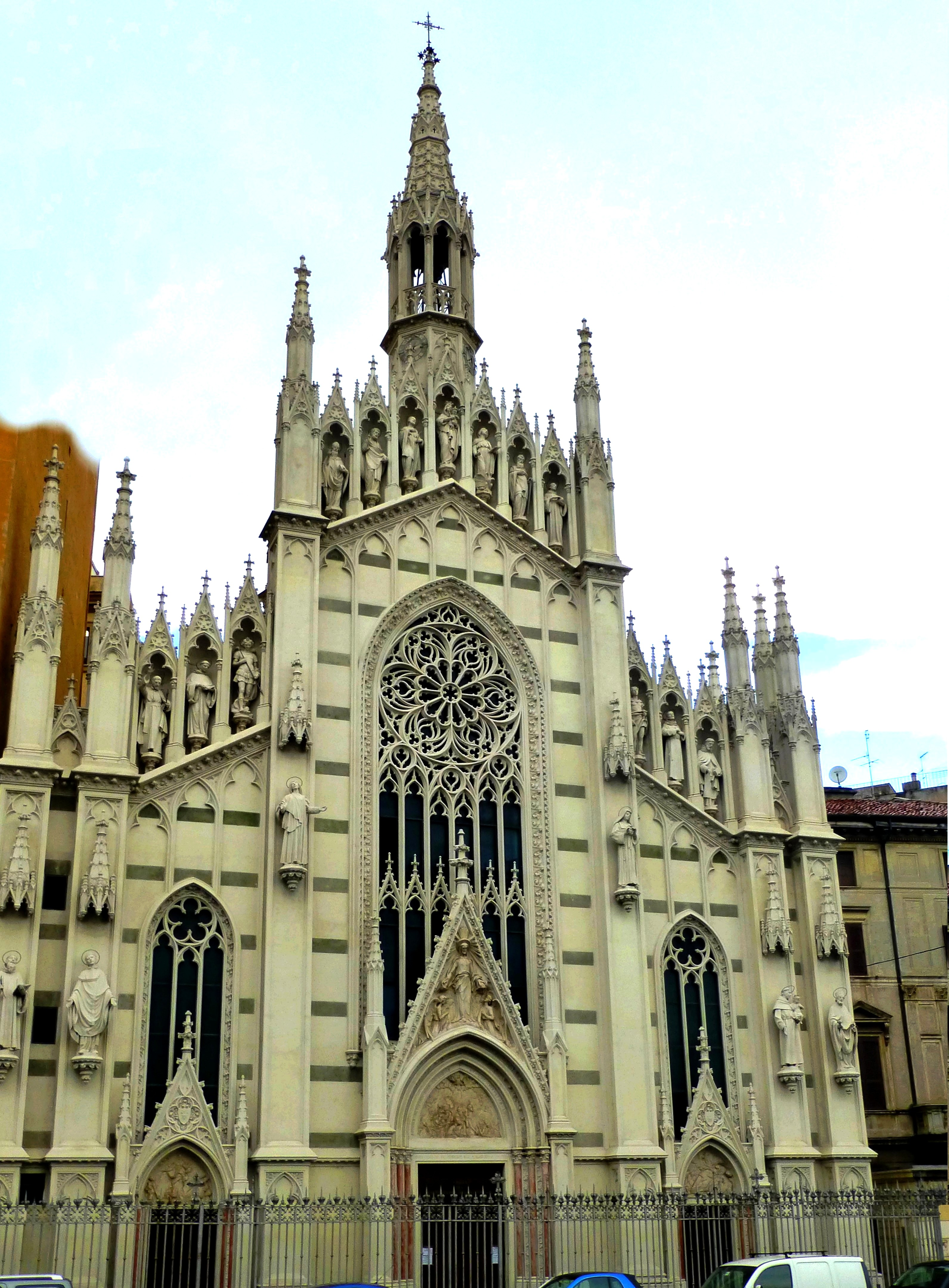
Sacro Cuore del Suffragio, Rome

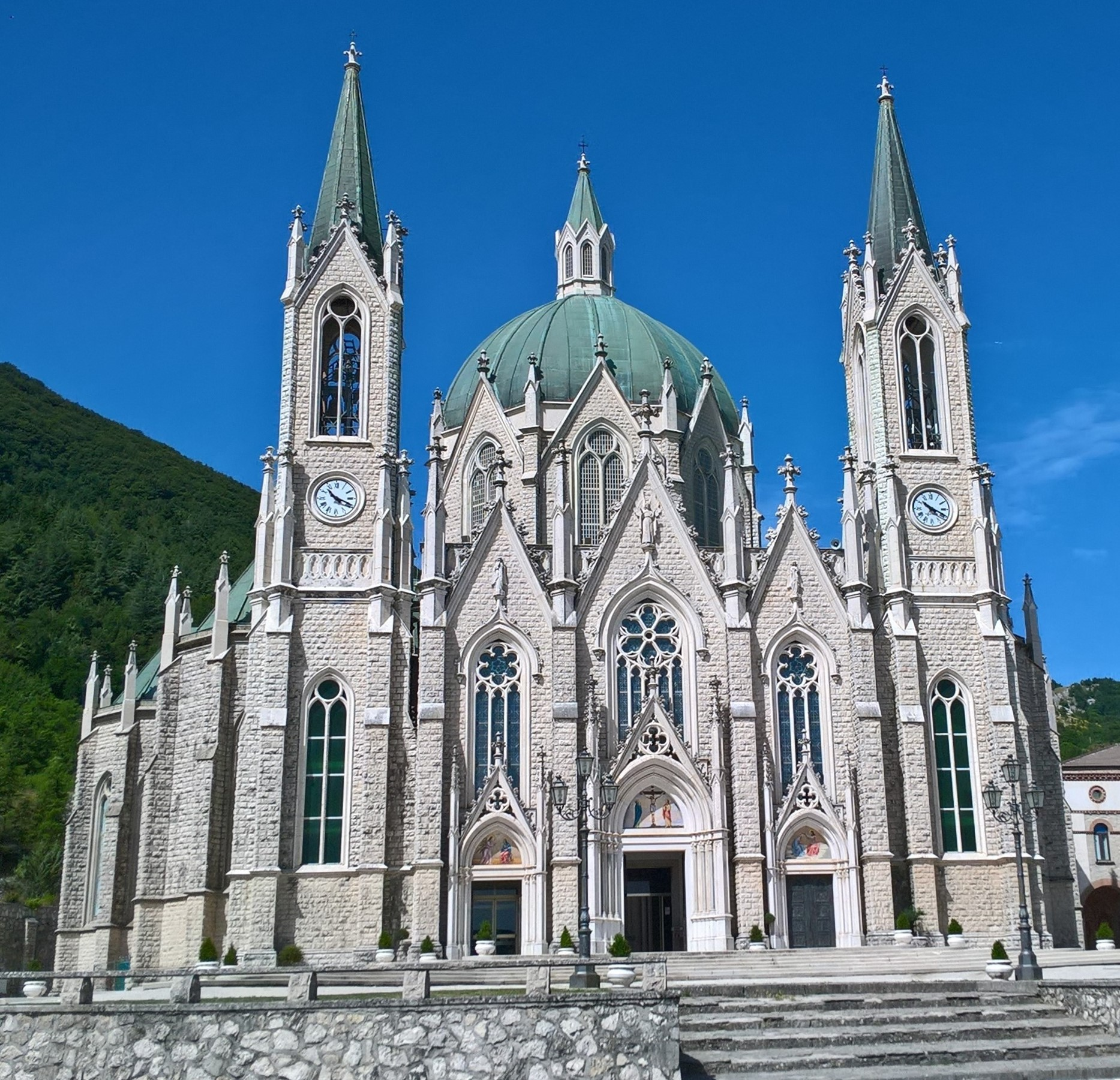
Basilica of Our Lady of Sorrows (Isernia)

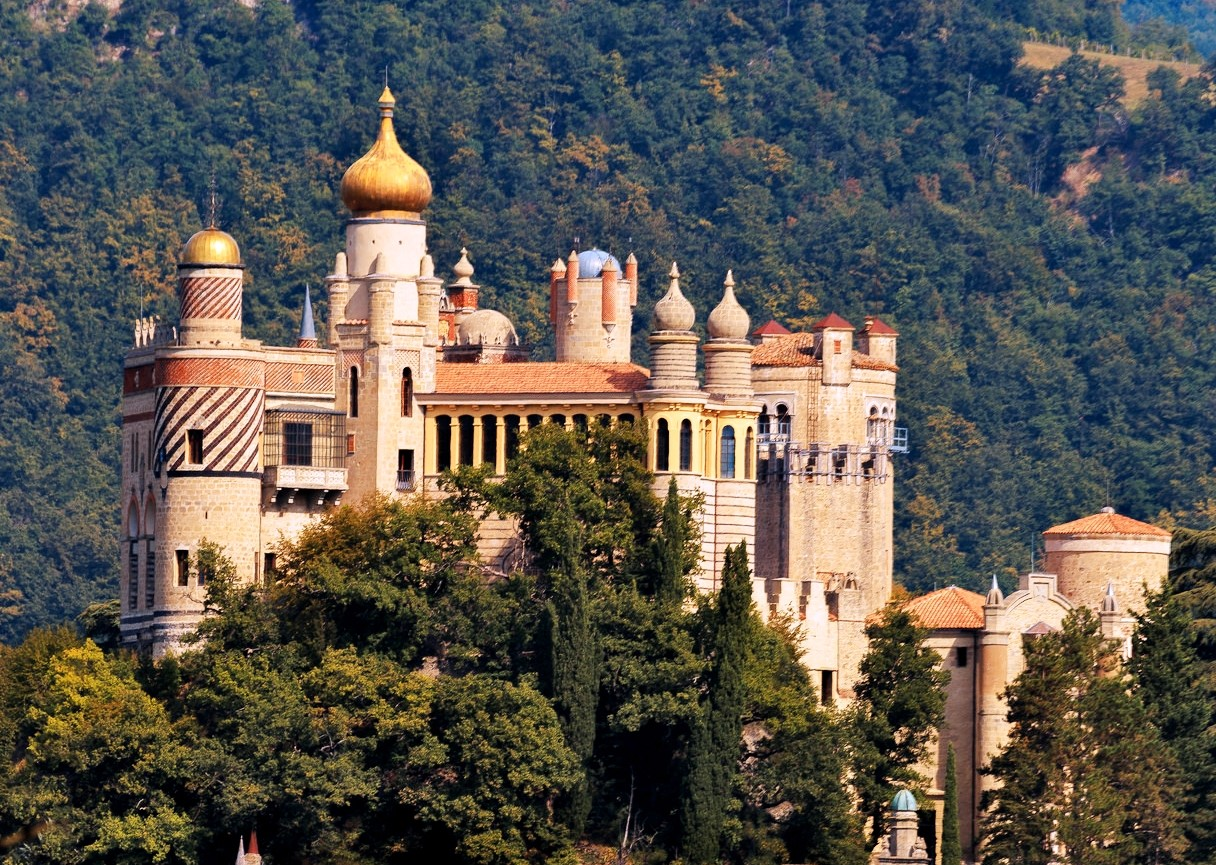
Rocchetta Mattei (Metropolitan City of Bologna)

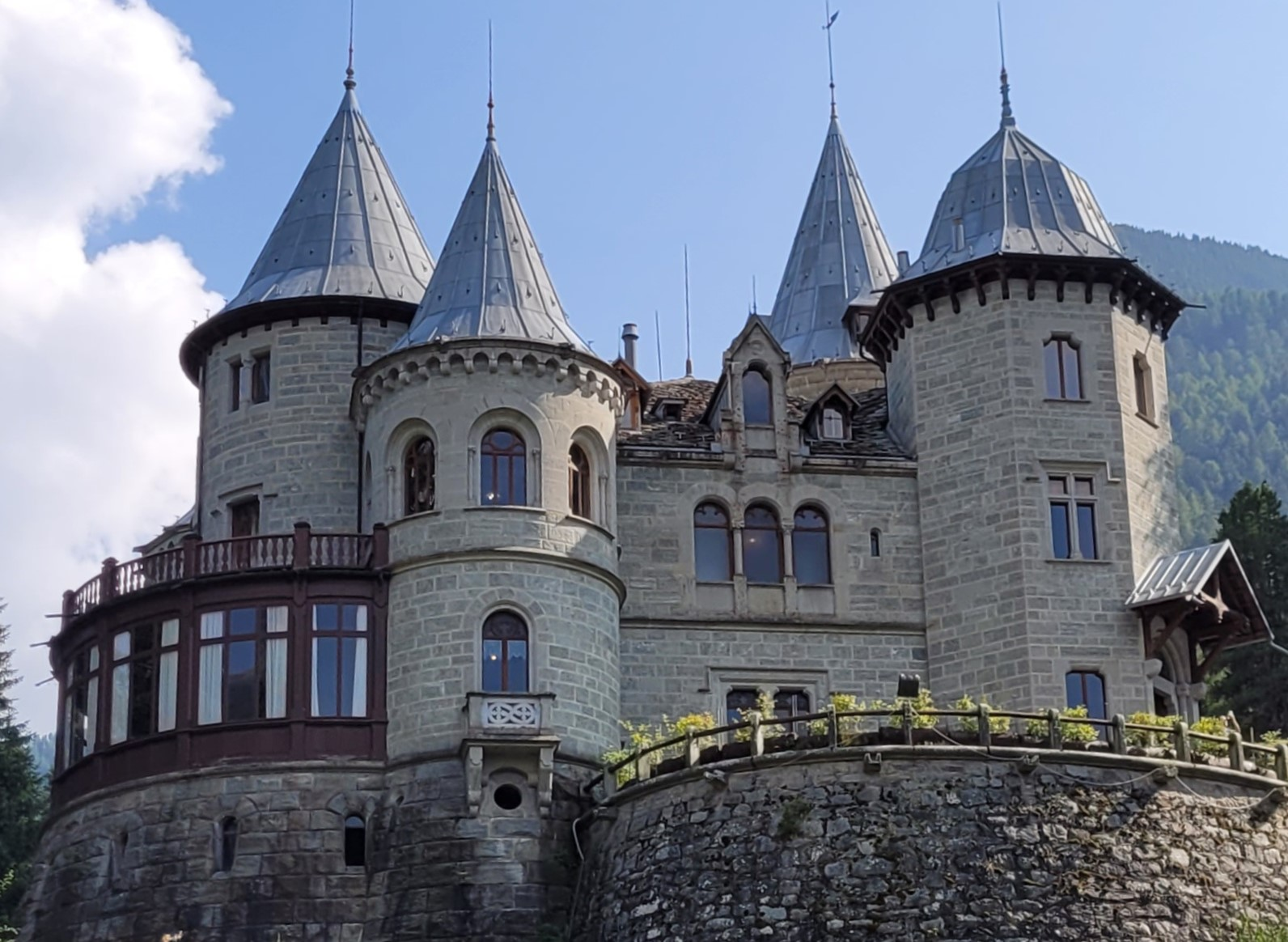
Savoy Castle, Gressoney-Saint-Jean

== Interpretation difficulties ==
Several interpretative difficulties have emerged regarding the nature of Italian Romanticism, anomalously called upon to construct a national identity in opposition to classicism, in which Italian culture had its distinctive trait. Anglophone foreign observers often failed to understand, precisely during the period when Italy was their beloved destination on the Grand Tour, that many Italian authors sought to use classicism itself as an instrument of modernity.

Furthermore, those Italian writers who did not participate in the debate between classicists and Romantics detested being grouped into a single category of writing. Therefore, Romantic Italy can seem to be home of numerous isolated literary figures, without a univocal meaning for the term "Romanticism" itself.

In 1908 Gina Martegiani even wrote in The Voice an essay titled Italian Romanticism Does Not Exist, arguing that 19th-century writers in Italy were either all classicists, or those who considered themselves Romantics merely imitated German works, while Romanticism is supposed to be anything but an imitation. Although well-argued, her essay was nevertheless considered paradoxical, and instead helped to emphasize that Italian Romanticism had different connotations than those in the rest of Europe.

Benedetto Croce in La Critica responded that her thesis was based on a reductive conception of Romanticism as a poetic "deviation" from classical canons, when in reality it was to be considered the second great revolution of the European spirit after the Renaissance, which affected all fields of knowledge, such as philosophy or politics, and involved every country. Therefore, the very contrast between classicism and Romanticism was misleading.

Beyond its nominal designation, it led to a renewal of Italian culture, as Stendhal noted, toward modernity, and the recovery of early Romantic texts in the second half of the twentieth century confirms this assessment.

== Bibliography ==
- Krömer, Wolfram (1961). Ludovico Di Breme (1780-1820), der erste Theoretiker der Romantik in Italien (in German). Geneva: Librairie Droz.
- Le tradizioni filosofiche nell'Italia unita entry (in Italian) by Giovanni Rota, edited by Umberto Eco in the Enciclopedia Treccani (2014)
- Il romanticismo storico in Italia entry (in Italian) by Alberto Del Giudice, edited by Umberto Eco in the Enciclopedia Treccani (2014)
- Mario Andrea Rigoni (April–June 2001). "Leopardi, Schelling, Madame de Staël e la scienza romantica della natura". Lettere Italiane (in Italian). LIII (2). Leo S. Olschki: 247–256. JSTOR 26266691.
- Carlo Tivaroni, Storia critica del Risorgimento italiano, L. Roux, 1889.
- Andrea Maurici, Il romanticismo in Sicilia, R. Sandron, 1893.
- Francesco de Sanctis (1953). Carlo Muscetta and Giorgio Candeloro (ed.). La scuola cattolico-liberale e il Romanticismo a Napoli (in Italian). Turin: Einaudi.
- Edmondo Cione (1957). Napoli romantica: 1830–1848 (in Italian). Naples: Morano Editore.
- Michele Federico Sciacca (1963). Il pensiero italiano nell'età del Risorgimento (in Italian). Marzorati.
- Sciacca, Michele Federico (1966). "Lo spiritualismo italiano e A. Rosmini" (VI). La filosofia nel suo sviluppo storico: dal secolo XIX ai nostri giorni (in Italian). Vol. 3. Rome: Cremonese.
- Plantinga, Leon (1989). La musica romantica. Storia dello stile musicale nell'Europa dell'Ottocento (in Italian). Feltrinelli. ISBN 978-8807180064.
- Raimondi, Ezio (1997). Lucia Rodler (ed.). Romanticismo italiano e romanticismo europeo (in Italian). Milan: Mondadori. ISBN 978-8842494454.
- Camilletti, Fabio A. (2015). Classicism and Romanticism in Italian Literature. Routledge. doi:10.4324/9781315655192. ISBN 978-1315655192.
- Costazza, Alessandro (2017). Il romantico nel Classicismo, il classico nel Romanticismo (in Italian). Milan: LED Edizioni Universitarie. ISBN 978-8879168717.
- Luzzi, Joseph (2008). Romantic Europe and the Ghost of Italy. Yale University Press. ISBN 978-0300151787.
- Luzzi, Joseph (2016). "The Task of Italian Romanticism". In Paul Hamilton (ed.). The Oxford Handbook of European Romanticism. Oxford University Press. ISBN 978-0191064975.
