= The Kiss (Hayez) =

1859 painting by Francesco Hayez

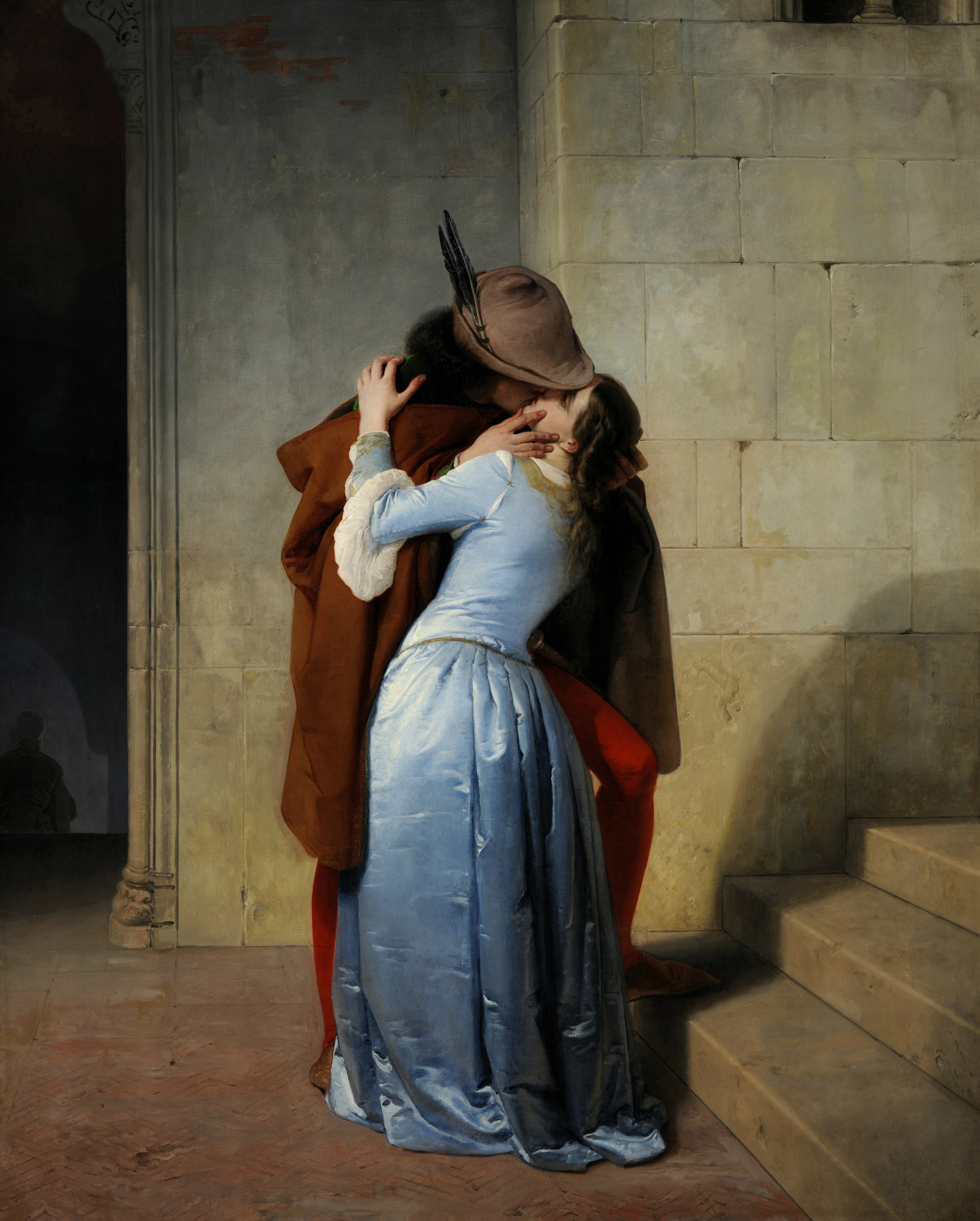
- Artist: Francesco Hayez
- Year: 1859
- Medium: oil on canvas
- Dimensions: 110 cm × 88 cm (43 in × 35 in)
- Location: Pinacoteca di Brera, Milan

The Kiss (Italian: Il bacio [il ˈbaːtʃo]) is an 1859 painting by the Italian artist Francesco Hayez. Possibly his best-known work, the painting conveys the main features of Italian Romanticism and has come to represent the spirit of the Risorgimento. It was commissioned by Alfonso Maria Visconti di Saliceto, who donated it to the Pinacoteca di Brera after his death.

== Historical context ==
After the defeat of Napoleonic France in the 19th century, the Congress of Vienna was held in 1815 to redraw the map of Europe. Italy following the Congress was divided up into states ruled directly or strongly influenced by the Habsburgs of the Austrian Empire. That fragmentation went against the growing nationalist sentiment for Italian unification and caused the creation of secret societies with democratic and radical orientations, such as the Carboneria and Young Italy. Although those associations were unsuccessful, their role was fundamental in shaping public opinion.

The First Italian War of Independence (1848) was a failure, but, by 1859, a secret agreement between Napoleon III and Camillo Benso, Count of Cavour, stipulated the formation of an anti-Austrian alliance. The contribution of France was crucial, the Austrian Army being defeated by the alliance in the Second Italian War of Independence. That victory initiated the unification process, and the Kingdom of Italy was proclaimed a few years later, in 1861.

It was during that period that Francesco Hayez painted The Kiss. Mindful of the bloody repression of the nationalist movement, Hayez decided to disguise the ideals of conspiracy and the struggle against the invaders by a representation of past events. The use of ambiguous, opaque metaphors allowed the artist to avoid censorship by the authorities.

== History ==
The first version of The Kiss was commissioned by Count Alfonso Maria Visconti of Saliceto. Hayez, who was very well known amongst Milanese patriots, was asked by the Count to depict the hopes associated with the alliance between France and the Kingdom of Sardinia.

The artwork was created in 1859 and presented at the Pinacoteca di Brera on 9 September. It was hung as a decoration in the luxurious residence of the Visconti family for more than 25 years. It was only in 1886, a year before his death, that the Count presented the canvas to the Pinacoteca di Brera, where it is still exhibited, in Room XXXVII.

Although the oil version is the most famous one, Hayez produced two other versions of the painting, one in oil and one watercolor. The second version was painted in 1861 for the Mylius family, and was sent to Paris to be exhibited in the 1867 Exposition Universelle. In 2008, that version was sold at Sotheby's for £780,450. The difference between the second painting and the previous one is that the woman's dress is coloured white. The third version is the only one to have been rendered in watercolor on paper. Painted in 1859, it has an oval shape and was donated by Hayez to Carolina Zucchi. It is now exhibited at the Pinacoteca Ambrosiana in Milan.

The last painting differs from the original by the addition of a white cloth lying on the steps beside the couple and by the bright green paint used for the man's mantle.

== Description ==
The painting represents a couple from the Middle Ages embracing while they kiss each other. It is among the most passionate and intense representations of a kiss in the history of Western art. The woman leans backwards while the man bends his left leg so as to support her and simultaneously places a foot on the step next to him as though poised to go at any moment. The couple, though at the centre of the painting, are not recognizable, as Hayez wanted the action of the kissing to be at the centre of the composition. In the left part of the canvas shadowy forms lurk in the corner to give an impression of conspiracy and danger.

== Composition ==
The geometric and perspective scheme of the painting is set on a series of diagonals that follows the course of the steps and converges to the vanishing point, placed to the left of the two lovers. The lines represent the framework of the painting and brings the observer's attention to the couple.

The chromatism of the painting is inherited from the Renaissance schools of the Venetian masters, where Hayez conducted his first studies. The brown of the cloak and the red of the boy's tights blend harmoniously with the light blue in the dress of the girl, and the neutral shades of the background help the couple stand out. A light, coming from an external source placed to the left of the picture, hits the whole scene homogeneously: its reflections enhances the silky dress of the girl and emphasises the pavement and the bricks on the wall.

== Interpretation ==
The painting has been regarded as a symbol of Italian Romanticism of which it encompasses many features. On a more superficial level, the painting is the representation of a passionate kiss, which puts itself in accordance with the principles of Romanticism. Therefore, it emphasizes deep feelings rather than rational thought and presents a reinterpretation and reevaluation of the Middle Ages in a patriotic and nostalgic tone. Some art historians also suggest that one of the political meanings that the painting can carry is that a young Italian soldier, going off to fight for Italy against Austria and saying goodbye to his love kissing her for one last time.

On a deeper level, the painting symbolizes the romantic, nationalist and patriotic ideals of Italian unification, an interpretation that is endorsed by several iconographic elements.

The imminent farewell between the lovers is suggested by the man's foot temporarily resting on the step and the tight grasp with which his beloved is holding him. That represents the necessity that he must leave and shows the danger of being a patriot. Other elements are the dagger hidden in the mantle, a sign of the imminent rebellion against the Habsburg invader and the date of the painting (1859, the year of the Second Italian War of Independence). However, the most obvious allegory in the painting is its chromatic range, which summarizes the political changes that involved Italy in the 19th century. In the Brera version, the blue of the woman's dress and the bright red of the young man's tights allude to the colours of the French flag.

Hayez intended to pay tribute to France, which was now allied with Italy. In the three subsequent versions the allegorical-patriotic connotations became even more obvious: in the 1861 version, the dress of the girl assumed a neutral white tone, as a tribute to the proclamation of the Kingdom of Italy. In the fourth version, Italy manifests itself instead in the clothes of the man, who now wears a green cloak symbolising the Italian flag.

== Legacy ==
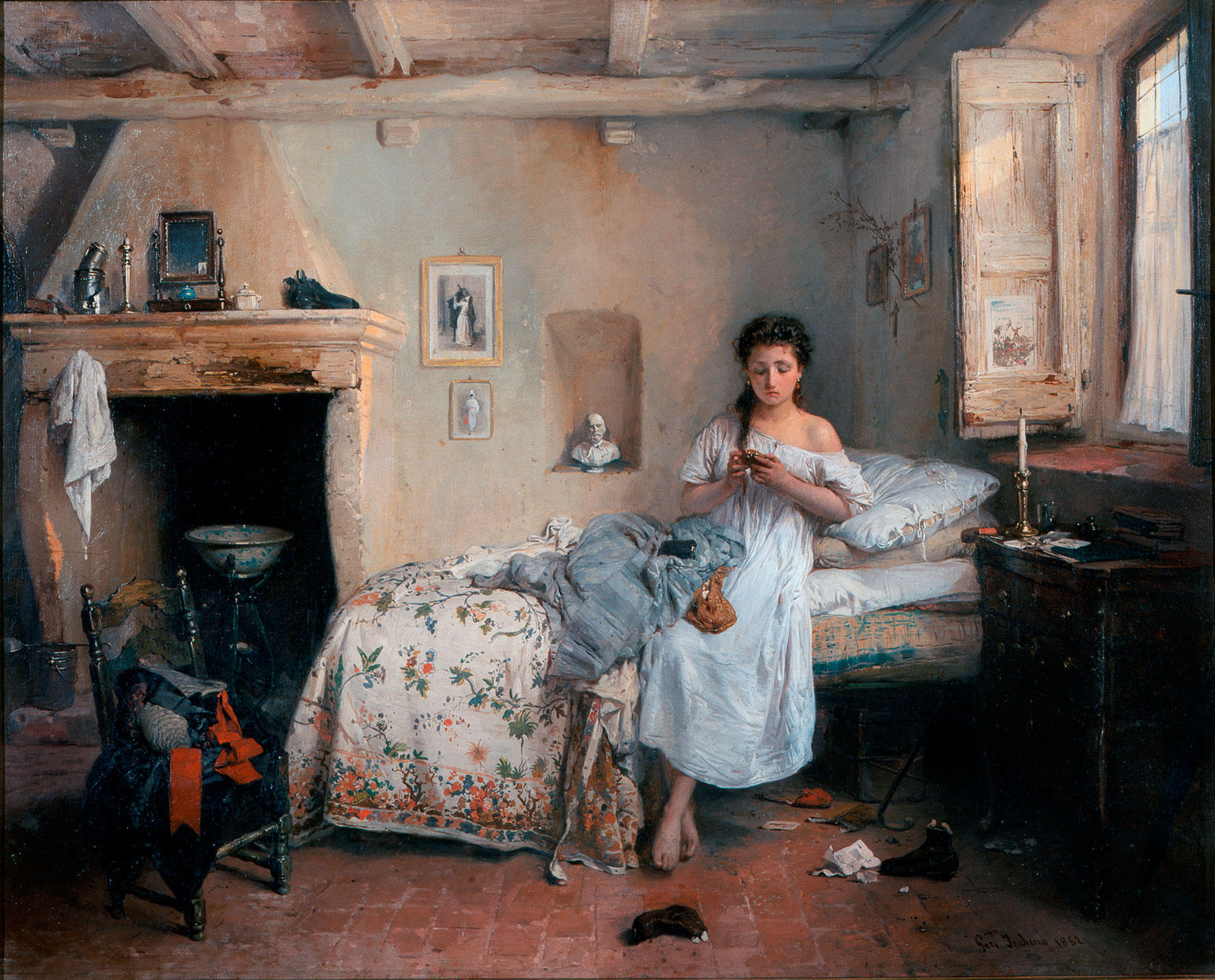
Gerolamo Induno, Sadness (1862). The Kiss is depicted in this painting, hanging on the wall.

The Kiss has enjoyed extensive popularity from its exhibition onward, especially in Italy, and has been the subject of much commentary. In the 1920s, the art director of Perugina, one of Italy's leading chocolate manufacturers, revised the image of the painting and created the typical blue box of the popular "Baci" chocolates with the picture of two lovers. In 1954 the great Italian director Luchino Visconti took inspiration from the painting for one of the leading scenes of his masterpiece movie, Senso.

== Literature ==
- C. Bertelli, G. Briganti, A. Giuliano Storia dell'arte italiana, Electa-Mondadori vol. 4.
- C. Castellaneta, S. Coradeschi. L'opera completa di Hayez, Classici dell'arte Rizzoli, Milano, 1966.
- F. Mazzocca Hayez, Dossier Art Giunti, Florence, 1998.
- M. Monteverdi, Neoclassicismo e aspetti accademici del primo romanticismo italiano, in: Storia della pittura italiana dell'Ottocento. Vol. I. Bramante Editrice, Busto Arsizio, 1984.
- La Nuova Enciclopedia dell'arte Garzanti, Giunti, Florence, 1986.
