= Guglielmo Berchet =

Italian patriot and historian

- Born: 1833; Mestre, Lombardy–Venetia
- Died: 15 June 1913 (aged 79–80)
- Occupation: Historian of Venice

Guglielmo Berchet (1833 – 15 June 1913) was an Italian patriot and historian. With regard to the latter, most of his works were related to the history of Venice.

== Biography ==
He was born in Villa Carpanedo near Mestre. He was the grandson of the poet Giovanni Berchet. At the age of 16 years, he joined the civil guards in the brief defense of the Venetian republic against the Austrian reconquest. He studied jurisprudence in the University of Padua, but soon after graduation began writing books on Venetian history. With Niccolo Barozzi, he collated Relazione degli ambasciatori della Republica Veneta. Returning to Venice, his close friendship with Cristoforo Negri, Foreign Minister of Piedmont, and his activities made his suspect in the eyes of the Austrian authorities, and he fled to Garda. With the annexation of Venice to the Kingdom of Italy, Berchet served in various positions as a councilor to the Royal Commissioner, Giuseppe Pasolini. He also was director and published in the Venetian gazette (Gazzetta di Venezia). He continued to write historical works, availing himself of the information in the Venetian archives. He published a study of the Mappamundo of Fra Mauro and studies on Marco Polo.

Among his major works is his contribution to the 58 volumes of comprising the Diaries of Marino Sanuto, a statesman of the Republic who lived from 1466 to 1536. This work was completed alongside Rinaldo Fulin, Federigo Stefani, and Niccolò Barozzi. He also published a Fonti Italiane per la storia della scoperta d'America (1892). In 1893, he published the correspondence between his grandfather Giovanni and Giacinto di Collegno. He served for many years as secretary for the Istituto Veneto di Scienze.

== Works ==
- Diarii di Marino Sanuto; Volume 56, 1901.
- I Republica di Venezia e la Persia, (1865): covers the period circa 1460 - 1673
- Cromwell e la repubblica di Venezia, (1864): Contemporary documents regarding Oliver Cromwell in Venetian archives
- Portulani esistenti nelle principali biblioteche di Venezia (1866): Nautical Charts found in Venetian libraries
- Relazioni dei consoli veneti nella Siria, (1866)
- Fonti italiane per la storia della scoperta del Nuovo mondo, Volume I, part 3, (1892)
- I Malatesta a Venezia, (1862): Documents regarding the House of Malatesta in Venetian archives
