= Giovanni Berchet =

Italian poet and patriot

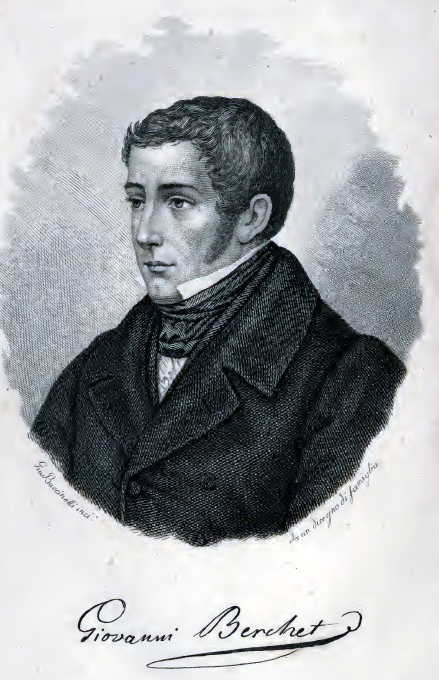
Giovanni Berchet.

Giovanni Berchet (Italian pronunciation: [dʒoˈvanni berˈʃɛ]; 23 December 1783 – 23 December 1851) was an Italian poet and patriot. He wrote an influential manifesto on Italian Romanticism, Lettera semiseria di Grisostomo, which appeared in 1816, and contributed to Il Conciliatore, a reformist periodical.

Berchet was born in Milan. He participated in various nationalist activities, including the revolutions that shook the Italian peninsula in 1821. Thereafter, he lived in exile, primarily in Britain, until returning to Italy to take part in the revolutions of 1848. His works include Il trovatore, Il romito del Cenisio, and, most famously, I profughi di Parga (1821).

Lettera semiseria (Half-serious letter) presents the translations (written by Berchet) of two poems by Gottfried August Bürger as an example of a new kind of poetry, and expresses the author's thought about contents and language that can reach a new public: that is, no longer a public of academic readers, but the so-called "third class", i.e. the bourgeoisie, which is waiting for books that are interesting, full of real feelings, simple in language, without mythology and classic models. This text played an important role in the debate over Romanticism that developed in Italy (specially in Milan) in the second decade of the 19th century.

Giovanni was the grandfather of the historian Guglielmo Berchet.
