= Il Conciliatore =

Italian magazine (1818–1819)

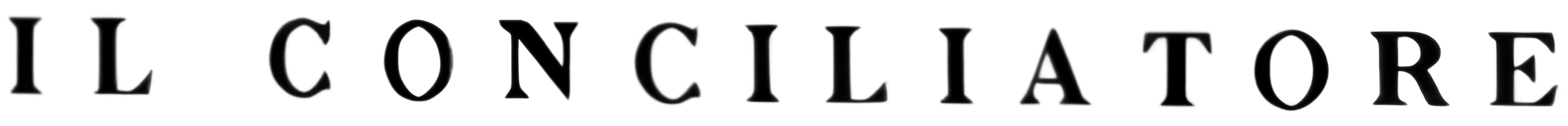

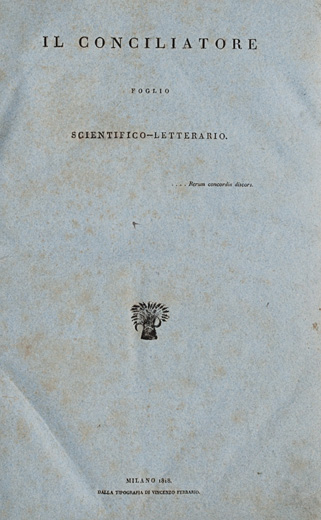
- Cover page of Il Conciliatore
- Categories: Literary magazine
- Frequency: Twice weekly
- First issue: 1819
- Final issue Number: 118
- Country: Kingdom of Lombardy–Venetia
- Language: Italian

Il Conciliatore was a progressive bi-weekly scientific and literary journal, influential in the early Risorgimento. The journal was published in Milan from September 1818 until October 1819 when it was closed by the Austrian censors. Its writers included Ludovico di Breme, Giuseppe Nicolini and Silvio Pellico. The latter wrote articles for the magazine supporting the publication of novels in Italy.

== Description ==
The name of the magazine was intended to suggest reconciliation between Neoclassicism and Romanticism. Edited by Silvio Pellico and Ludovico di Breme, it attracted contributions from leading Italian liberal intellectuals on economics, education, social issues, and science. Its literature articles paid particular attention to history and the theatre, and included contributions by Gian Domenico Romagnosi, Giovanni Berchet, Pietro Borsieri, Giuseppe Nicolini and Ermes Visconti.

Earnestly pedagogical in spirit, the foglio azzurro ("blue sheet", so called from the colour of its paper) was in trouble from the start with polemical rivals and the censors, who eventually closed it down in October 1819. The former editor of the magazine, Silvio Pellico, was arrested in October 1821 and sentenced to fifteen years' labour, to be served in the notorious Moravian Špilberk Castle.

== Bibliography ==
- Gallavresi, Giuseppe (1931). "CONCILIATORE". Enciclopedia Italiana (in Italian). Rome: Istituto dell'Enciclopedia Italiana.
- Clerici, Edmondo (1903). Il "Conciliatore": periodico milanese (1818-1819). Pisa: Tipografia successori FF. Nistri.
- Cantù, Cesare (1878). Il Conciliatore e i carbonari. Milan: Treves.
- Renaudet, Augustin (1954). "Un groupe milanais ami de stendhal: Le Conciliatore". Annales. Histoire, Sciences Sociales. 9 (3): 289–295. JSTOR 27579632.
