= Ludovico di Breme =

Italian writer and thinker (1780–1820)

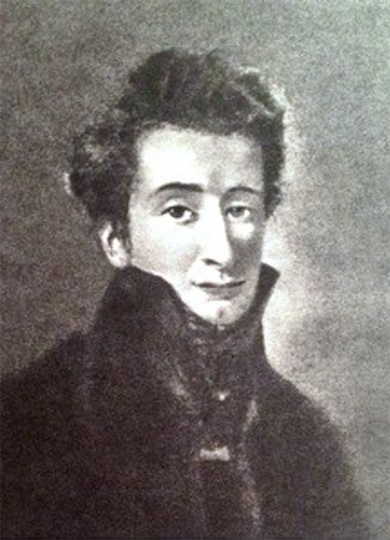
Ludovico di Breme

Ludovico di Breme (Turin, 1780 – Turin, 15 August 1820), whose complete name was Ludovico Arborio Gattinara dei Marchesi di Breme, was an Italian writer and thinker, as well as a contributor to Milan's principal Romantic journal, Il Conciliatore.

== Biography ==
Born in Piemonte to an ancient noble family, when still young he moved to Milan, where he held various offices in the court of the viceroy Eugène de Beauharnais and kept up a busy social life, remaining there after the fall of the Kingdom of Italy in April 1814.

His friendship with Germaine de Staël and an intellectual affinity with her caused him to rush to her defence in the 1816 polemics over Romanticism. In Intorno all'ingiustizia di alcuni giudizi letterari italiani, published in Milan in 1816, and a Grand commentaire sur un petit article, published in Geneva the next year, he extended her arguments in favour of Romantic rather than classical models and reiterated her warnings against excessive reliance on past cultural achievements.

A series of Osservazioni on Lord Byron's poem The Giaour (1818) explored the nature of modern poetry, which he located in the "pathetic", by which he meant not melancholy but "depth and vastness of feeling". He returned to polemic on Romanticism in general in a dispute with Londonio (1818), and was one of the principal founders of the Romantic literary journal Il Conciliatore, to which he contributed essays and satirical sketches.
