= Giuseppe Nicolini (sculptor) =

Italian sculptor

Giuseppe Nicolini (March 4, 1855 in Palermo, Kingdom of the Two Sicilies – ?) was an Italian sculptor.

He was orphaned as a child. By six years of age, he was able to study decoration and designs, including relief sculpture at the Scuola Tecnica Serale (Night Technical School) of Palermo. Nicolini then became artistic director of the commercial (industrial sculpture) studio of Salvatore Coco. One of his brothers was a decorator (painter), and his nephew Giovanni (1872-1956), was a sculptor He learned how to carve ivory and bone, as well as model in wax. He worked on the decoration of furniture, including painted pieces. He then established a studio for sculpting in marble, wood, and cement. He won a prize for the design of the reliefs for the Royal School and Museum of Artistic Industry in Palermo. He completed the decoration of the Communal Theater of Siracusa, alongside the architect professor G. Damiani Almeyda, director of that opera house. He also sculpted a Monument to Francesco Ferrara.
