= Giuseppe Nicolini (writer) =

Giuseppe Nicolini (28 October 1788 – 26 August 1855) was an Italian poet, literary critic, and politician active in the Risorgimento, the nineteenth-century nationalist movement that led to the creation of Italy as a unified nation. Nicolini wrote for the progressive periodical Il Conciliatore, composed poetry, and published prose as well. He translated much of Lord Byron's poetry into Italian and wrote one of the earliest biographies of Byron.

He was born in Brescia, the son of a merchant, and after studying philosophy there, went on to study law at the University of Bologna, where he graduated in 1807. He preferred teaching to law, however, and after a few years as a lawyer took up an appointment as a professor in the Brescia Ginnasio. For a brief period he was also a professor of history at the principal Liceo in Verona. When his political activities cost him his teaching job in 1821, writing became his main profession. He lived the rest of his life in Brescia, where he married in 1840 and became the father of seven children. Giuseppe Nicolini died in the cholera epidemic that struck the city in 1855.

== Sources ==
- Fabi, M., Introduction to Giuseppe Nicolini, Vita di Giorgio Lord Byron, Alessandro Lombardi, 1855, pp. i-viii.
