= Italian philosophy =

Philosophical tradition of Italy

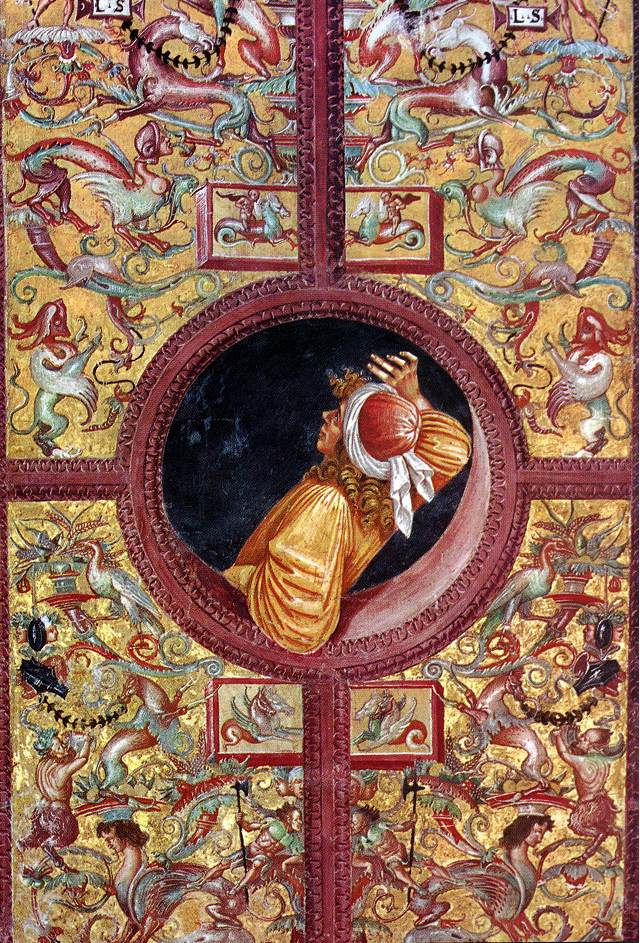
Luca Signorelli, Empedocles, 1499–1502. The fresco is part of the Stories of the Last Days cycle that decorates the San Brizio Chapel in the Orvieto Cathedral. Empedocles, a philosopher from Agrigento, Magna Graecia, who is one of the most illustrious characters who decorate the base of the chapel, is portrayed as he observes the Last Judgment in amazement.

Over the ages, Italian philosophy had a vast influence on Western philosophy, beginning with the Greeks and Romans, and going onto Renaissance humanism, the Age of Enlightenment and modern philosophy. Philosophy was brought to Italy by Pythagoras, founder of the school of philosophy in Crotone, Magna Graecia. Major philosophers of Magna Graecia include Parmenides, Zeno, Empedocles and Gorgias. Roman philosophers include Cicero, Lucretius, Seneca the Younger, Musonius Rufus, Plutarch, Epictetus, Marcus Aurelius, Clement of Alexandria, Sextus Empiricus, Alexander of Aphrodisias, Plotinus, Porphyry, Iamblichus, Augustine of Hippo, Philoponus of Alexandria and Boethius.

Italian Medieval philosophy was mainly Christian, and included philosophers and theologians such as St Thomas Aquinas, the foremost classical proponent of natural theology and the father of Thomism, who reintroduced Aristotelian philosophy to Christianity. Notable Renaissance philosophers include: Giordano Bruno, one of the major scientific figures of the western world; Marsilio Ficino, one of the most influential humanist philosophers of the period; and Niccolò Machiavelli, one of the main founders of modern political science. Italy was also affected by the Enlightenment. University cities such as Padua, Bologna, and Naples remained centres of scholarship and intellect, with philosophers such as Giambattista Vico (widely regarded as the founder of modern Italian philosophy) and Antonio Genovesi. Cesare Beccaria was a significant Enlightenment figure and is now considered one of the fathers of classical criminal theory as well as modern penology.

Italy also had a renowned philosophical movement in the 1800s, with Idealism, Sensism and Empiricism. The main Sensist Italian philosophers were Melchiorre Gioja and Gian Domenico Romagnosi. Criticism of the Sensist movement came from other philosophers such as Pasquale Galluppi. Antonio Rosmini, instead, was the founder of Italian idealism. During the late 19th and 20th centuries, there were also several other movements which gained some form of popularity in Italy, such as Ontologism (whose main philosopher was Vincenzo Gioberti), anarchism, communism, socialism, futurism, fascism and Christian democracy. Giovanni Gentile and Benedetto Croce were two of the most significant 20th-century Idealist philosophers. Antonio Gramsci remains a relevant philosopher within Marxist and communist theory, credited with creating the theory of cultural hegemony. Italian philosophers were also influential in the development of the non-Marxist liberal socialism philosophy, including Carlo Rosselli, Norberto Bobbio, Piero Gobetti and Aldo Capitini. In the 1960s, many Italian left-wing activists adopted the anti-authoritarian pro-working class leftist theories that would become known as autonomism and operaismo.

Early Italian feminists include Sibilla Aleramo, Alaide Gualberta Beccari, and Anna Maria Mozzoni, though proto-feminist philosophies had previously been touched upon by earlier Italian writers such as Christine de Pizan, Moderata Fonte, and Lucrezia Marinella. Italian physician and educator Maria Montessori is credited with the creation of the philosophy of education that bears her name, an educational philosophy now practiced throughout the world. Giuseppe Peano was one of the inspirers of analytic philosophy and contemporary philosophy of mathematics. Recent analytic philosophers include Carlo Penco, Gloria Origgi, Pieranna Garavaso and Luciano Floridi.

== Greek origins ==
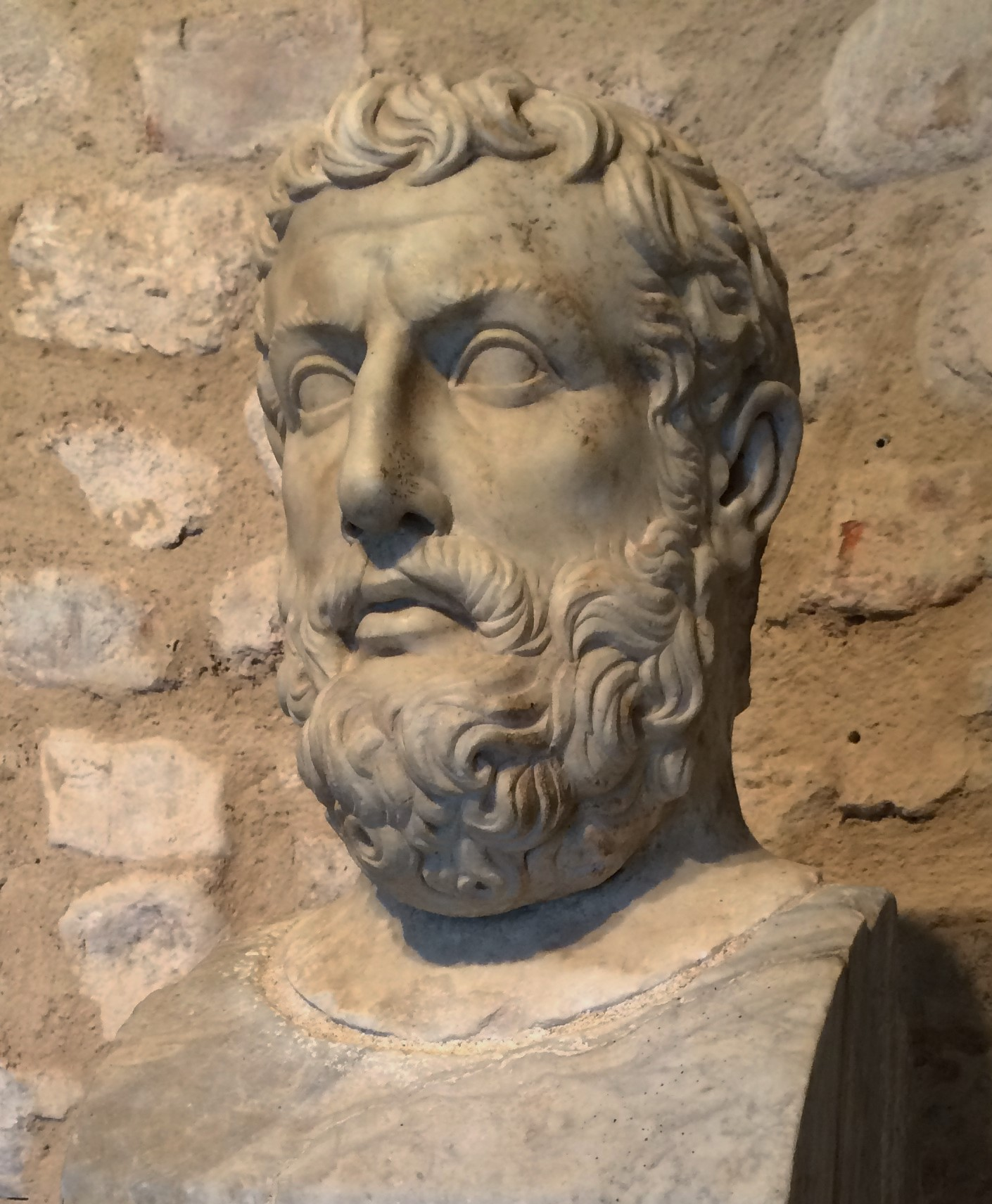
Parmenides

Philosophy was brought to Italy by Pythagoras, founder of the school of philosophy in Crotone, Magna Graecia. Major Italian philosophers of the Greek period include Parmenides, Zeno, Empedocles and Gorgias.

Parmenides has been considered the founder of ontology or metaphysics and has influenced the whole history of Western philosophy. His single known work, a poem later titled On Nature, has survived only in fragments. Approximately 160 verses remain today from an original total that was probably near 800. The poem was originally divided into three parts: An introductory proem which explains the purpose of the work, a former section known as "The Way of Truth" (aletheia, ἀλήθεια), and a latter section known as "The Way of Appearance/Opinion" (doxa, δόξα).

Empedocles' philosophy is best known for originating the cosmogonic theory of the four classical elements. Empedocles is considered the last Greek philosopher to write in verse. There is a debate about whether the surviving fragments of his teaching should be attributed to two separate poems, "Purifications" and "On Nature", with different subject matter, or whether they may all derive from one poem with two titles, or whether one title refers to part of the whole poem. Some scholars argue that the title "Purifications" refers to the first part of a larger work called (as a whole) "On Nature".

Gorgias, along with Protagoras, forms the first generation of Sophists. "Like other Sophists, he was an itinerant who practised in various cities and gave public exhibitions of his skill at the great pan-Hellenic centres of Olympia and Delphi, and charged fees for his instruction and performances. A special feature of his displays was to ask miscellaneous questions from the audience and give impromptu replies." He has been called "Gorgias the Nihilist" although the degree to which this epithet adequately describes his philosophy is controversial.

== Ancient Rome ==
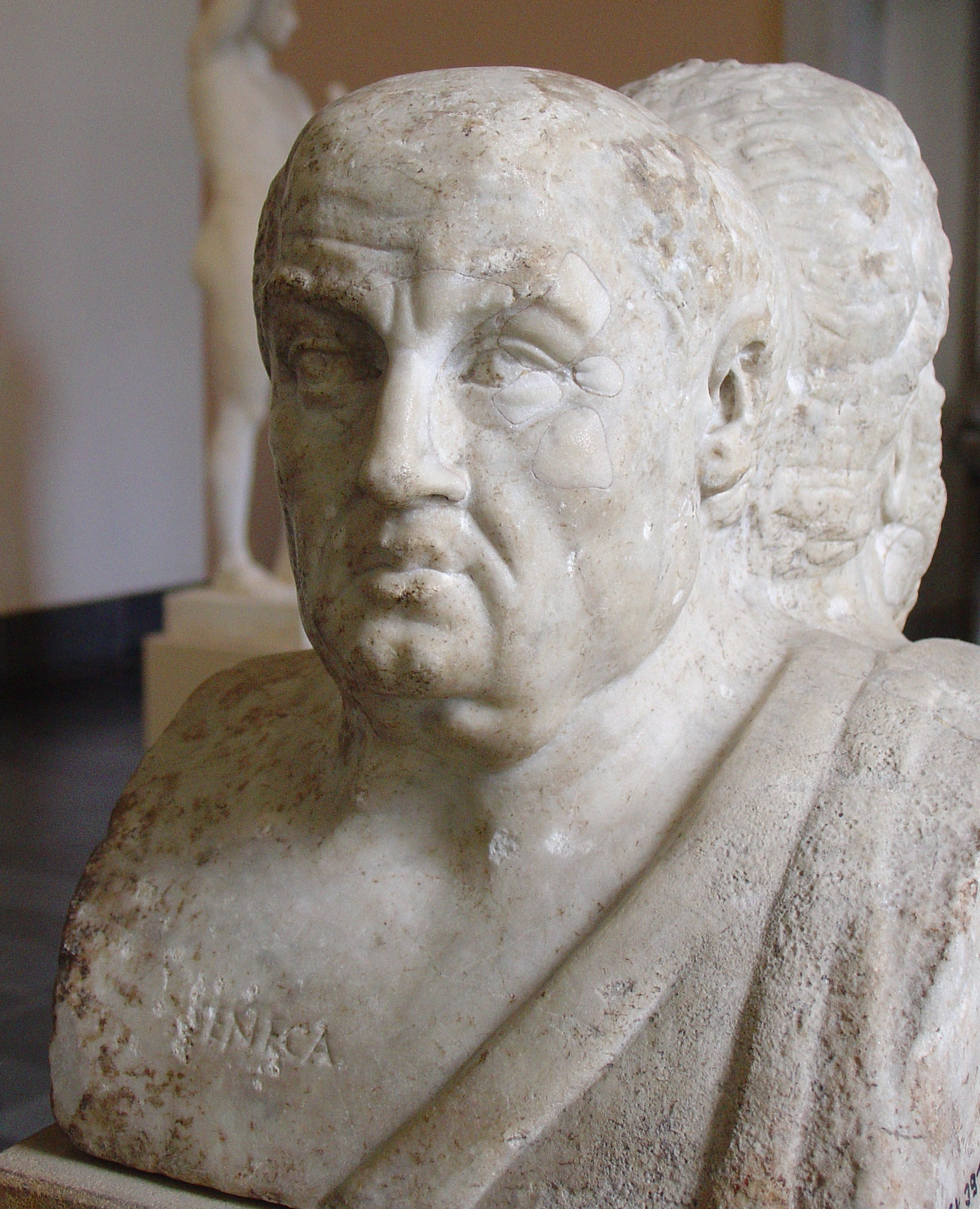
Seneca

Ancient Roman philosophy was heavily influenced by the ancient Greeks and the schools of Hellenistic philosophy; however, unique developments in philosophical schools of thought occurred during the Roman period as well. Interest in philosophy was first excited at Rome in 155 BC by an Athenian embassy consisting of the Academic skeptic Carneades, the Stoic Diogenes of Babylon, and the Peripatetic Critolaus.

During this time Athens declined as an intellectual center of thought while new sites such as Alexandria and Rome hosted a variety of philosophical discussion. Both leading schools of law of the Roman period, the Sabinian and the Proculean Schools, drew their ethical views from readings on the Stoics and Epicureans respectively, allowing for the competition between thought to manifest in a new field in Rome's jurisprudence. It was during this period that a common tradition of the western philosophical literature was born in commenting on the works of Aristotle.

There were several formidable Roman philosophers, such as Cicero (106–43 BC), Lucretius (94–55 BC), Seneca (4 BC – 65 AD), Musonius Rufus (30 AD – 100 AD), Plutarch (45–120 AD), Epictetus (55–135 AD), Marcus Aurelius (121–180 AD), Clement of Alexandria (150–215 AD), Alcinous (2nd century AD), Sextus Empiricus (3rd century AD), Alexander of Aphrodisias (3rd century AD), Ammonius Saccas (3rd century AD), Plotinus (205–270 AD), Porphyry (232–304 AD), Iamblichus (242–327 AD), Themistius (317–388 AD), Augustine of Hippo (354–430 AD), Proclus (411–485 AD), Philoponus of Alexandria (490–570 AD), Damascius (462–540 AD), Boethius (472–524 AD), and Simplicius of Cilicia (490–560 AD).

== Medieval ==
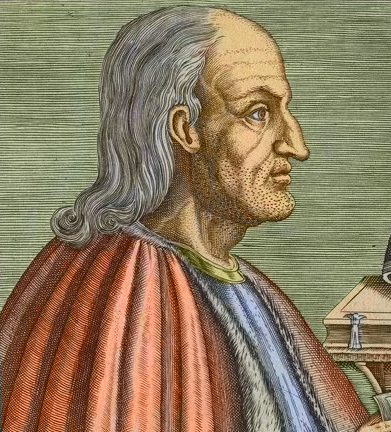
A colourised 16th-century portrait of Anselm, Archbishop of Canterbury

Italian Medieval philosophy was mainly Christian, and included several important philosophers and theologians such as Anselm of Aosta. Born in 1033 in Aosta, in his mid-twenties Anselm entered the Benedictine school at Bec in Normandy where he came under the tutelage of Lanfranc.

In 1063 Anselm succeeded Lanfranc as prior and was consecrated abbot in 1078. Anselm held the office of Archbishop of Canterbury from 1093 to 1109. He is famed as the originator of the ontological argument for the existence of God and of the satisfaction theory of atonement. Anselm's works are considered philosophical as well as theological since they endeavour to render Christian tenets of faith, traditionally taken as a revealed truth, as a rational system.

Among the Italian medieval philosophers who exerted the greatest influence a very important one is Peter Lombard. Born in Lumellogno, in the region of Novara, Italy, Peter studied first in the cathedral school of Rheims. In 1136 he arrived in Paris with a letter of introduction from Bernard of Clairvaux to Gilduin, abbot of the house of Saint Victor, where Hugh of Saint Victor was the leading thinker.

Peter became a Master of Arts in the Parisian schools by 1143 or 1144. In 1145 he was made a canon of the cathedral of Notre-Dame in Paris. By 1156, perhaps earlier, Peter was archdeacon of Paris; in 1159 he became bishop of Paris. Peter's most enduring contribution to medieval thought was the Sententiae in IV libris distinctae (Four Books of Sentences, 1155–7), a systematic investigation of the whole range of questions that arise under the topic now designated ‘theology’. Often presented in modern scholarship as merely a collection of the opinions of earlier authorities on theological topics, the Sententiae is now recognized as a sophisticated work that resolves major (and minor) theological issues with skill and insight. Generations of university scholars, including Thomas Aquinas, wrote commentaries on it as part of their theological education and teaching. Peter also wrote influential biblical commentaries on the Psalms and the Pauline epistles (Magna glossatura).

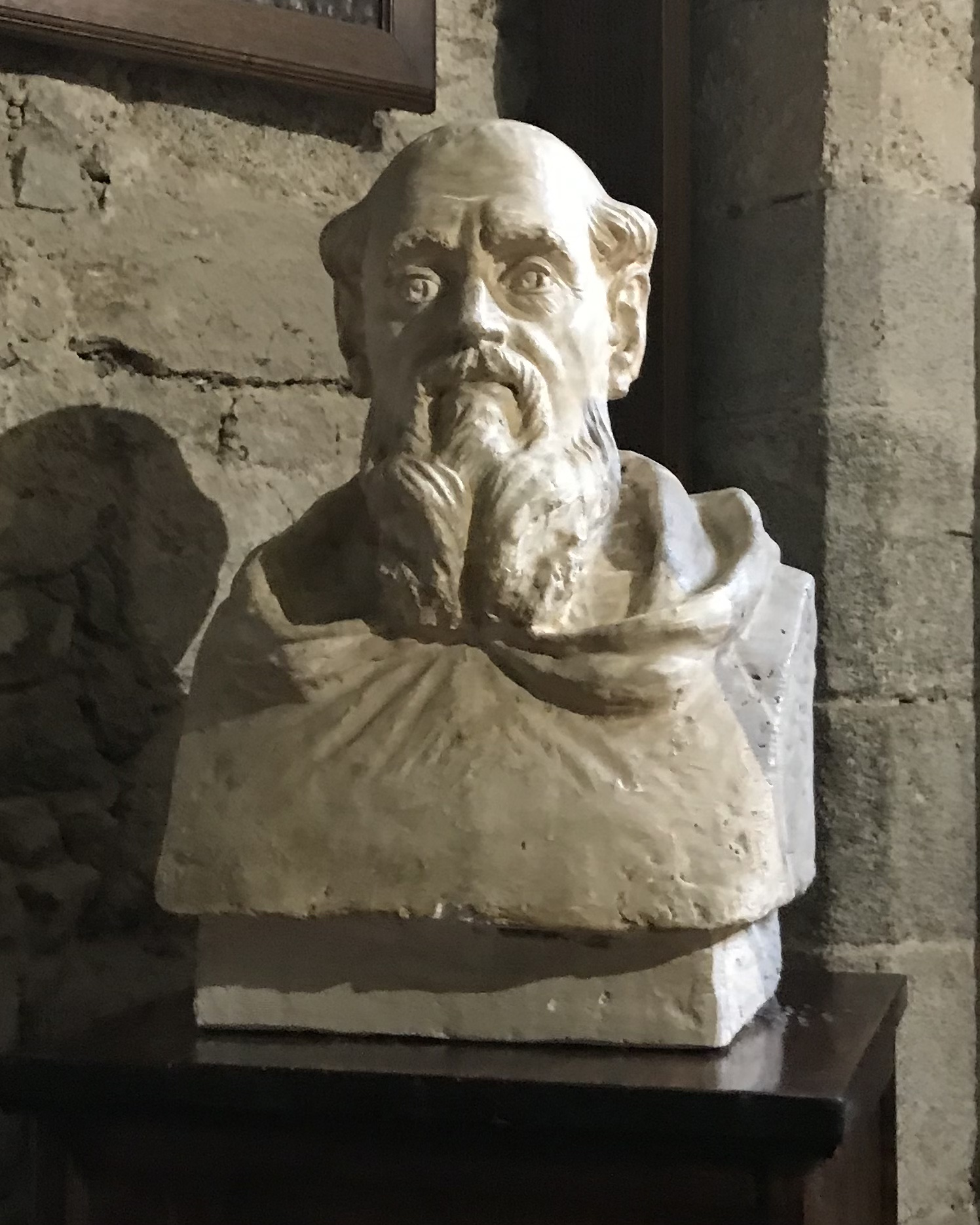
Bust of Joachim of Fiore, San Giovanni in Fiore Abbey

Almost contemporary to Peter Lombard was the influential mystic theologian Joachim of Fiore (c. 1132-1202). At first a Cistercian, in the early 1190s, he founded a new congregation, the Florenses, whose centre was the San Giovanni in Fiore Abbey, near Cosenza. Monk, exegete, and religious reformer, Joachim of Fiore stands among the most original and sophisticated apocalyptic thinkers of the Middle Ages. Over the course of his career, he composed a number of major and minor works challenging the normative Augustinian position that God's plan for history after the Bible could not be known, above all concerning the course of future events.

Joachim held a Trinitarian conception of history, which he divided into three ages (status): the age of the Father, in the Old Testament; the age of the Son, the period of the Church; and the shortly-to-be-inaugurated age of the Spirit. The age of the Father, corresponding to the Old Testament, was characterized by strict obedience to God's law and fear, represented by the condition of servants. The age of the Son, spanning from the advent of Christ up to Joachim's days, represented the era of the Church. It was a time of filial obedience and faith, where humanity lived as sons of God. The age of the Holy Spirit was the final age of history. It was to be characterized by complete spiritual freedom, universal love, and deep contemplation. In this era, the formal Church hierarchy was expected to give way to a new Spiritual Church.

Joachim's views were influential among the new orders of the 13th century, especially the Spiritual Franciscans. Scholars like Oswald Spengler, Henri de Lubac and Eric Voegelin note that Joachim's theological model of a progressive, three-stage movement toward a spiritual culmination laid the conceptual groundwork for modern philosophies of history, most notably Hegelian historicism.

Although Joachim remained orthodox in the eyes of established clerical authorities during his lifetime, some of his posthumous devotees espoused radical apocalyptic views that earned them ecclesiastical censure and condemnation. His trinitarian views were condemned during the Fourth Council of the Lateran (1215), casting a shadow of heterodoxy over his theology.

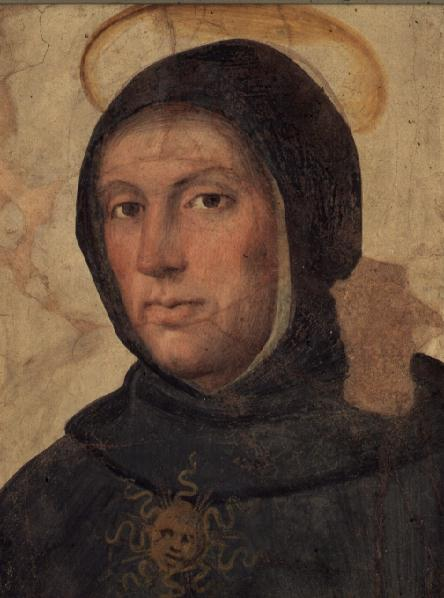
St Thomas Aquinas

The most important Italian medieval philosopher is St Thomas Aquinas, the foremost classical proponent of natural theology and the father of Thomism. Aquinas was the student of Albert the Great, a brilliant Dominican experimentalist, much like the Franciscan, Roger Bacon of Oxford in the 13th century.

Aquinas reintroduced Aristotelian philosophy to Christianity. He believed that there was no contradiction between faith and secular reason. He believed that Aristotle had achieved the pinnacle in the human striving for truth and thus adopted Aristotle's philosophy as a framework in constructing his theological and philosophical outlook. He was a professor at the prestigious University of Paris.

He argued that God is the source of both the light of natural reason and the light of faith. He has been described as "the most influential thinker of the medieval period" and "the greatest of the medieval philosopher-theologians." His influence on Western thought is considerable, and much of modern philosophy is derived from his ideas, particularly in the areas of ethics, natural law, metaphysics, and political theory.

The Catholic Church honors Thomas Aquinas as a saint and regards him as the model teacher for those studying for the priesthood, and indeed the highest expression of both natural reason and speculative theology. In modern times, under papal directives, the study of his works was long used as a core of the required program of study for those seeking ordination as priests or deacons, as well as for those in religious formation and for other students of the sacred disciplines (philosophy, Catholic theology, church history, liturgy, and canon law).

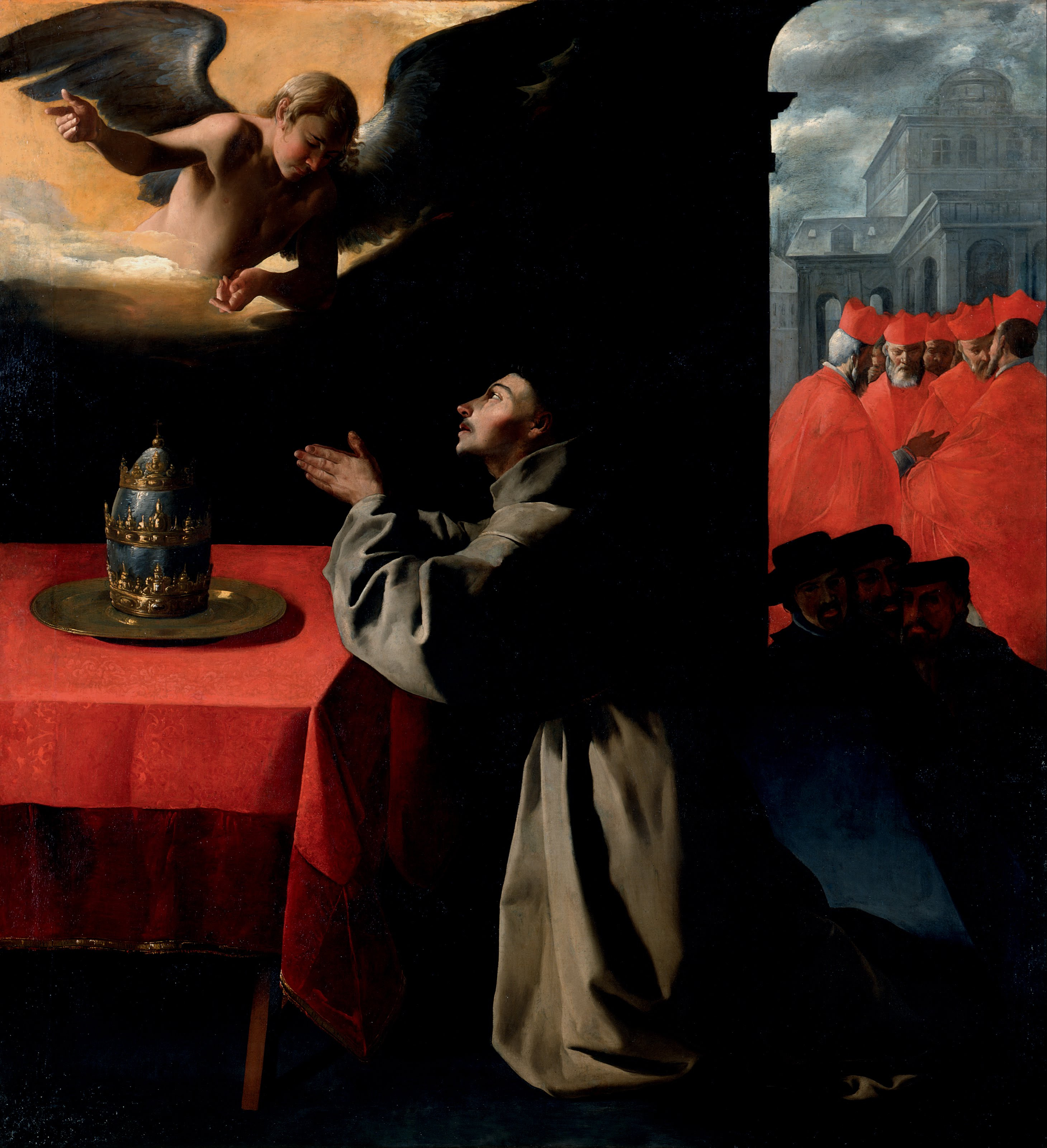
Francisco de Zurbarán: The Prayer of St. Bonaventura about the Selection of the New Pope.

Next to Aquinas ranks Bonaventure, perhaps the foremost Franciscan theologian of the 13th century, whose only real rival, in terms of immediate and ultimate influence, is the Scottish Duns Scotus.

A disciple of Alexander of Hales and John of La Rochelle, Bonaventure was an Augustinian, rejecting much of the Aristotelianism incorporated by his contemporary Thomas Aquinas. While Siger of Brabant and Boetius of Dacia, defended an Aristotle tainted with Averroism and Thomas Aquinas tried to give the Philosopher a theologically acceptable interpretation, Bonaventure moved in completely different way. Aristotle for him was an authority who must be read critically and with eyes open.

When in 1273 he gave his conferences on the Hexameron, he denounced the nefarious influence of Aristotle in Theology and undertook to expound what, according to him, Christian wisdom consisted in. This Christian wisdom that he intended to expound determined the sources of his knowledge; his choice was significant, since he turned more readily to Pseudo-Dionysius than to Aristotle. That is to say that he intended to construct a spiritual synthesis and not a rationally scientific work. In works such as Breviloquium or De triplici via, Bonaventure describes theology as wisdom (sapientia) rather than science (scientia) and considers its main task to be the achievement of spiritual perfection.

Gregory of Rimini was the first scholastic writer to unite the Oxonian and Parisian traditions in 14th-century philosophy. His work had a lasting influence in the Late Middle Ages and Reformation. His rigorous Augustinian theology emphasizing radical grace and human sinfulness heavily influenced Martin Luther. Luther explicitly cited Gregory of Rimini during the Leipzig/Luther-Eck disputations as an ally against prevailing scholastic notions of human merit.

== Renaissance ==
The Renaissance was an essentially Italian (Florentine) movement, and also a great period of the arts and philosophy. Among the distinctive elements of Renaissance philosophy are the revival (renaissance means "rebirth") of classical civilization and learning; a partial return to the authority of Plato over Aristotle, who had come to dominate later medieval philosophy; and, among some philosophers, enthusiasm for the occult and Hermeticism.

As with all periods, there is a wide drift of dates, reasons for categorization and boundaries. In particular, the Renaissance, more than later periods, is thought to begin in Italy with the Italian Renaissance and roll through Europe.

=== Humanism ===
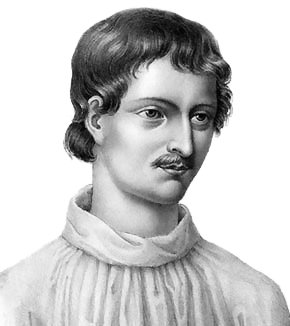
Giordano Bruno, one of the major scientific figures of the western world

Renaissance Humanism was a European intellectual movement that was a crucial component of the Renaissance, beginning in Florence in the latter half of the 14th century, and affected most of Italy. The humanist movement developed from the rediscovery by European scholars of Latin literary and Greek literary texts. Initially, a humanist was simply a scholar or teacher of Latin literature. By the mid-15th century humanism described a curriculum – the studia humanitatis – consisting of grammar, rhetoric, moral philosophy, poetry, and history as studied via Latin and Greek literary authors.

Humanism offered the necessary intellectual and philological tools for the first critical analysis of texts. An early triumph of textual criticism by Lorenzo Valla revealed the Donation of Constantine to be an early medieval forgery produced in the Curia. This textual criticism created sharper controversy when Erasmus followed Valla in criticizing the accuracy of the Vulgate translation of the New Testament, and promoting readings from the original Greek manuscripts of the New Testament.

Italian Renaissance humanists believed that the liberal arts (art, music, grammar, rhetoric, oratory, history, poetry, using classical texts, and the studies of all of the above) should be practiced by all levels of "richness". They also approved of self, human worth and individual dignity. They hold the belief that everything in life has a determinate nature, but man's privilege is to be able to choose his own path. Pico della Mirandola wrote the following concerning the creation of the universe and man's place in it:

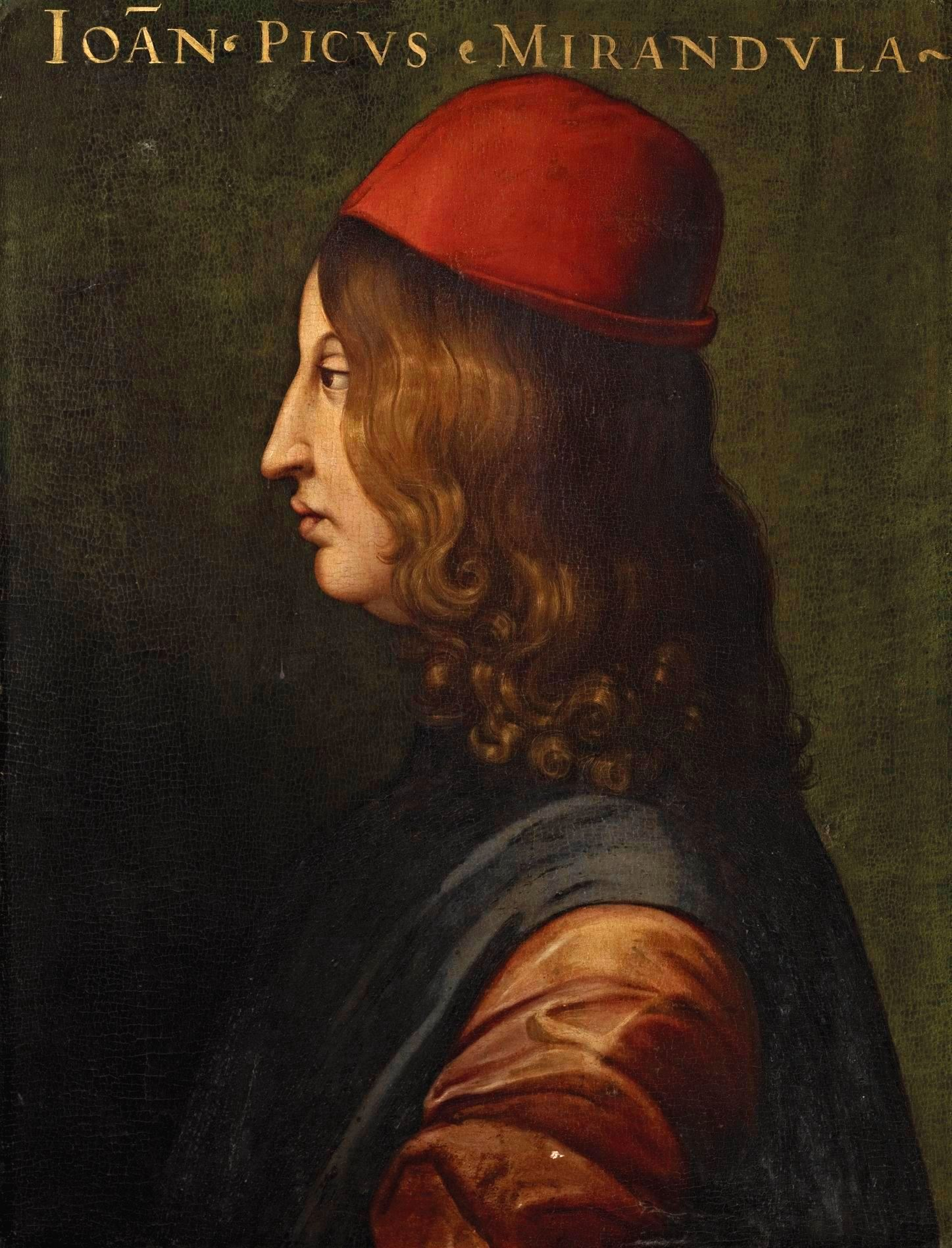
Pico della Mirandola

But when the work was finished, the Craftsman kept wishing that there were someone to ponder the plan of so great a work, to love its beauty, and to wonder at its vastness. Therefore, when everything was done... He finally took thought concerning the creation of man... He therefore took man as a creature of indeterminate nature and, assigning him a place in the middle of the world, addressed him thus: "Neither a fixed abode nor a form that is thine alone nor any function peculiar to thyself have we given thee, Adam, to the end that according to thy longing and according to thy judgement thou mayest have and possess what abode, what form and what functions thou thyself shalt desire. The nature of all other beings is limited and constrained within the bounds of law. Thou shalt have the power to degenerate into the lower forms of life, which are brutish. Thou shalt have the power, out of thy soul's judgement, to be born into the higher forms, which are divine."

Italian culture produced the great Renaissance commentators on Aristotle's Poetics. Giorgio Valla's 1498 Latin translation of Aristotle's text (the first to be published) was included with the 1508 Aldine printing of the Greek original as part of an anthology of Rhetores graeci. There followed an ever-expanding corpus of texts on poetics in the later fifteenth century and throughout the sixteenth, a phenomenon that began in Italy and spread to Spain, England, and France. Among the most important Renaissance works on poetics are Marco Girolamo Vida's De arte poetica (1527), Gian Giorgio Trissino's La Poetica (1529, expanded edition 1563) and Paolo Beni's commentary on Aristotle's Poetics (1613). By the early decades of the sixteenth century, Italian versions of Aristotle's Poetics appeared, culminating in Lodovico Castelvetro's editions of 1570 and 1576. In the baroque period Emanuele Tesauro, with his Cannocchiale aristotelico, re-presented to the world of post-Galilean physics Aristotle's poetic theories as the sole key to approaching the human sciences.

=== Neoplatonism ===
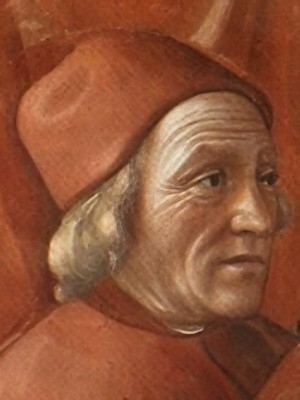
Marsilio Ficino, one of the most influential humanist philosophers of the Renaissance

Italy was also affected by a movement called Neoplatonism, which was a movement which had a general revival of interest in Classical antiquity. Interest in Platonism was especially strong in Florence under the Medici.

During the sessions at Florence of the Council of Ferrara-Florence in 1438–1445, during the failed attempts to heal the schism of the Orthodox and Catholic churches, Cosimo de' Medici and his intellectual circle had made acquaintance with the Neoplatonic philosopher George Gemistos Plethon, whose discourses upon Plato and the Alexandrian mystics so fascinated the learned society of Florence that they named him the second Plato.

In 1459 John Argyropoulos was lecturing on Greek language and literature at Florence, and Marsilio Ficino became his pupil. When Cosimo decided to refound Plato's Academy at Florence, his choice to head it was Ficino, who made the classic translation of Plato from Greek to Latin (published in 1484), as well as a translation of a collection of Hellenistic Greek documents of the Hermetic Corpus, and the writings of many of the Neoplatonists, for example Porphyry, Iamblichus, Plotinus, et al.. Following suggestions laid out by Gemistos Plethon, Ficino tried to synthesize Christianity and Platonism.

=== Machiavelli ===
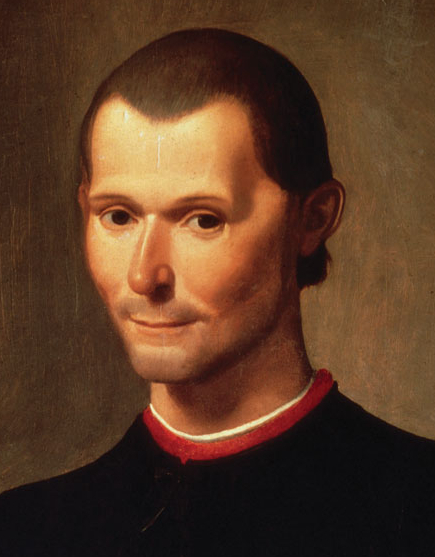
Niccolò Machiavelli (1469–1527), one of the main founders of modern political science

Niccolò di Bernardo dei Machiavelli (3 May 1469 – 21 June 1527) was an Italian philosopher /writer, and is considered one of the most influential Italian Renaissance philosophers and one of the main founders of modern political science. Machiavelli's best-known book Il Principe contains several maxims concerning politics. Instead of the more traditional target audience of a hereditary prince, it concentrates on the possibility of a "new prince". To retain royal authority, the hereditary prince does not have to do much to keep his position, as Machiavelli states that only an "excessive force" will deprive him of his rule. By contrast, a new prince has the more difficult task in ruling: He must first stabilize his newfound power in order to build an enduring political structure. Machiavelli views that the virtues often recommended to princes actually hinder their ability to rule, thus a prince must learn to be able to act opposite said virtues in order to maintain his regime. A ruler must be concerned not only with reputation, but also must be positively willing to act immorally at the right times.

While Machiavelli has become widely popular for his work on principalities, his other major work, The Discourses on Livy, focused mainly on republican statecraft, and his recommendations for a well ordered republic. Machiavelli noted how free republics have power structures that are better than principalities. He also notes how advantageous a government by a republic could be as opposed to just a single ruler. However, Machiavelli's more controversial statements on politics can also be found even in his other works. For example, Machiavelli notes that sometimes extraordinary means, such as violence, can be used in re-ordering a corrupt city. In one area, he praises Romulus, who murdered his brother and co-ruler in order to have power by himself to found the city of Rome. In a few passages he sometimes explicitly acts as an advisor of tyrants as well.

Francesco Guicciardini, Machiavelli's close friend and critic, read the book and wrote critical notes (Considerazioni) on many of the chapters. He also objected to much of Machiavelli's advice, as he thought that many of his recommendations were too violent. To this day, contemporary usage of Machiavellian is an adjective meaning "marked by cunning, duplicty, or bad faith". The Prince is the treatise that is most responsible for the term being brought about. To this day, Machiavellianism also remains a popular term used casually in political discussions, often as a byword for bare-knuckled political realism.

== Age of Enlightenment ==
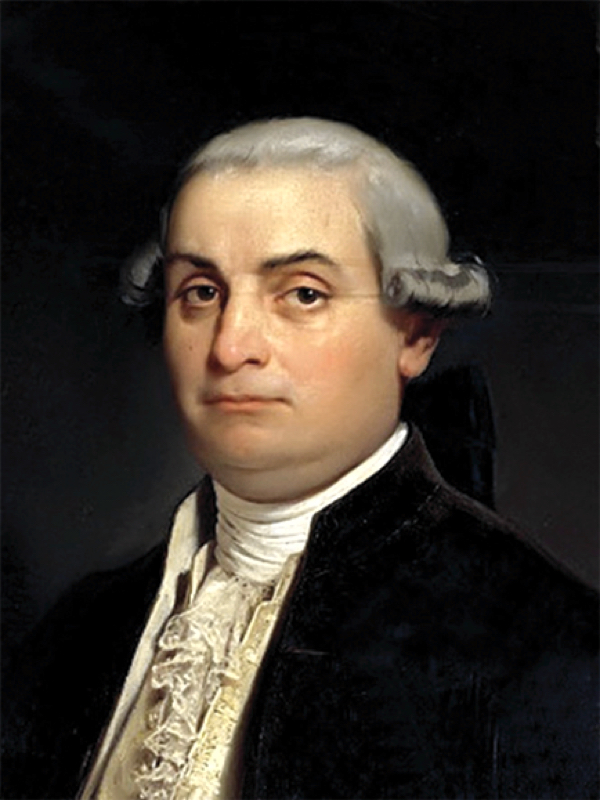
Cesare Beccaria (1738–1794) was one of the greatest writers of the Italian Age of Enlightenment.

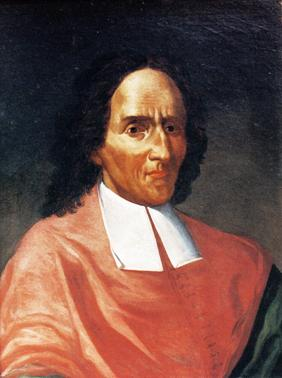
Giambattista Vico, one of the greatest philosophers of the Age of Enlightenment

Italy was also affected by the enlightenment, a movement which was a consequence of the Renaissance and changed the road of Italian philosophy. Followers of the group often met to discuss in private salons and coffeehouses, notably in the cities of Milan, Rome and Venice. Cities with important universities such as Padua, Bologna and Naples, however, also remained great centres of scholarship and the intellect, with several philosophers such as Giambattista Vico (1668–1744) (who is widely regarded as being the founder of modern Italian philosophy) and Antonio Genovesi.

Giambattista Vico criticized the expansion and development of modern rationalism, finding Cartesian analysis and other types of reductionism impractical to human life, and he was an apologist for classical antiquity and the Renaissance humanities, in addition to being the first expositor of the fundamentals of social science and of semiotics. He is recognised as one of the first Counter-Enlightenment figures in history. The Latin aphorism Verum esse ipsum factum ("truth is itself something made") coined by Vico is an early instance of constructivist epistemology. He inaugurated the modern field of the philosophy of history, and, although the term philosophy of history is not in his writings, Vico spoke of a "history of philosophy narrated philosophically."

Italian society also dramatically changed during the Enlightenment, with rulers such as Leopold II of Tuscany abolishing the death penalty. The church's power was significantly reduced, and it was a period of great thought and invention, with scientists such as Alessandro Volta and Luigi Galvani discovering new things and greatly contributing to Western science. Cesare Beccaria was a significant Enlightenment figure and is now considered one of the fathers of classical criminal theory as well as modern penology. Beccaria is famous for his On Crimes and Punishments (1764), a treatise that served as one of the earliest prominent condemnations of torture and the death penalty and thus a landmark work in anti-death penalty philosophy, which was later translated into 22 languages.

== Early modern and 19th-century philosophy ==
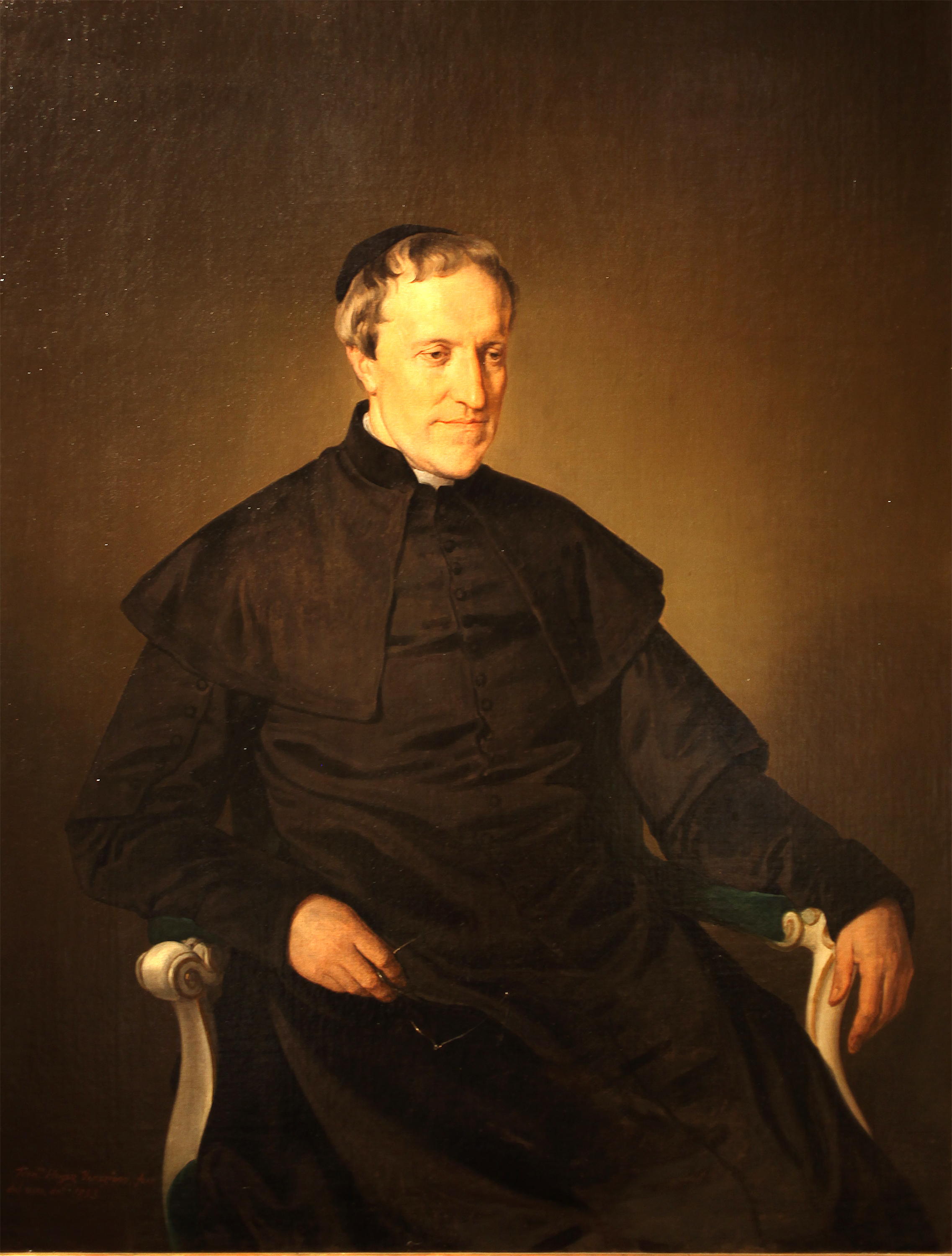
Antonio Rosmini, the progenitor of Italian spiritualism and idealism

Italy also had a renowned philosophical movement in the 1800s, with Idealism, Sensism and Empiricism. The main Sensist Italian philosophers were Melchiorre Gioja (1767–1829) and Gian Domenico Romagnosi (1761–1835). Criticism of the Sensist movement came from other philosophers such as Pasquale Galluppi (1770–1846), who affirmed that a priori relationships were synthetic.

With the transition from the Enlightenment to Romanticism, instead, new currents imbued with a strong religious, ideal and moral spiritualism emerged, which sought to give a cultural imprint to the historical path towards Italian unification. Antonio Rosmini, above all, was a pioneering father of Italian idealism. The most comprehensive view of Rosmini's philosophical standpoint is to be found in his Sistema filosofico, in which he set forth the conception of a complete encyclopaedia of the human knowable, synthetically conjoined, according to the order of ideas, in a perfectly harmonious whole. Contemplating the position of recent philosophy from Locke to Hegel, and having his eye directed to the ancient and fundamental problem of the origin, truth and certainty of our ideas, he wrote: "If philosophy is to be restored to love and respect, I think it will be necessary, in part, to return to the teachings of the ancients, and in part to give those teachings the benefit of modern methods" (Theodicy, a. 148). He examined and analysed the fact of human knowledge, and obtained the following results:

1. that the notion or idea of being or existence in general enters into, and is presupposed by, all our acquired cognitions, so that, without it, they would be impossible
2. that this idea is essentially objective, inasmuch as what is seen in it is as distinct from and opposed to the mind that sees it as the light is from the eye that looks at it
3. that it is essentially true, because being and truth are convertible terms, and because in the vision of it the mind cannot err, since error could only be committed by a judgment, and here there is no judgment, but a pure intuition affirming nothing and denying nothing
4. that by the application of this essentially objective and true idea the human being intellectually perceives, first, the animal body individually conjoined with him, and then, on occasion of the sensations produced in him not by himself, the causes of those sensations, that is, from the action felt he perceives and affirms an agent, a being, and therefore a true thing, that acts on him, and he thus gets at the external world, these are the true primitive judgments, containing
  1. the subsistence of the particular being (subject), and
  2. its essence or species as determined by the quality of the action felt from it (predicate)
5. that reflection, by separating the essence or species from the subsistence, obtains the full specific idea (universalization), and then from this, by leaving aside some of its elements, the abstract specific idea (abstraction)
6. that the mind, having reached this stage of development, can proceed to further and further abstracts, including the first principles of reasoning, the principles of the several sciences, complex ideas, groups of ideas, and so on without end
7. finally, that the same most universal idea of being, this generator and formal element of all acquired cognitions, cannot itself be acquired, but must be innate in us, implanted by God in our nature. Being, as naturally shining to our mind, must therefore be what men call the light of reason. Hence the name Rosmini gives it of ideal being; and this he laid down as the fundamental principle of all philosophy and the supreme criterion of truth and certainty. This he believed to be the teaching of St Augustine, as well as of St Thomas, of whom he was an ardent admirer and defender.

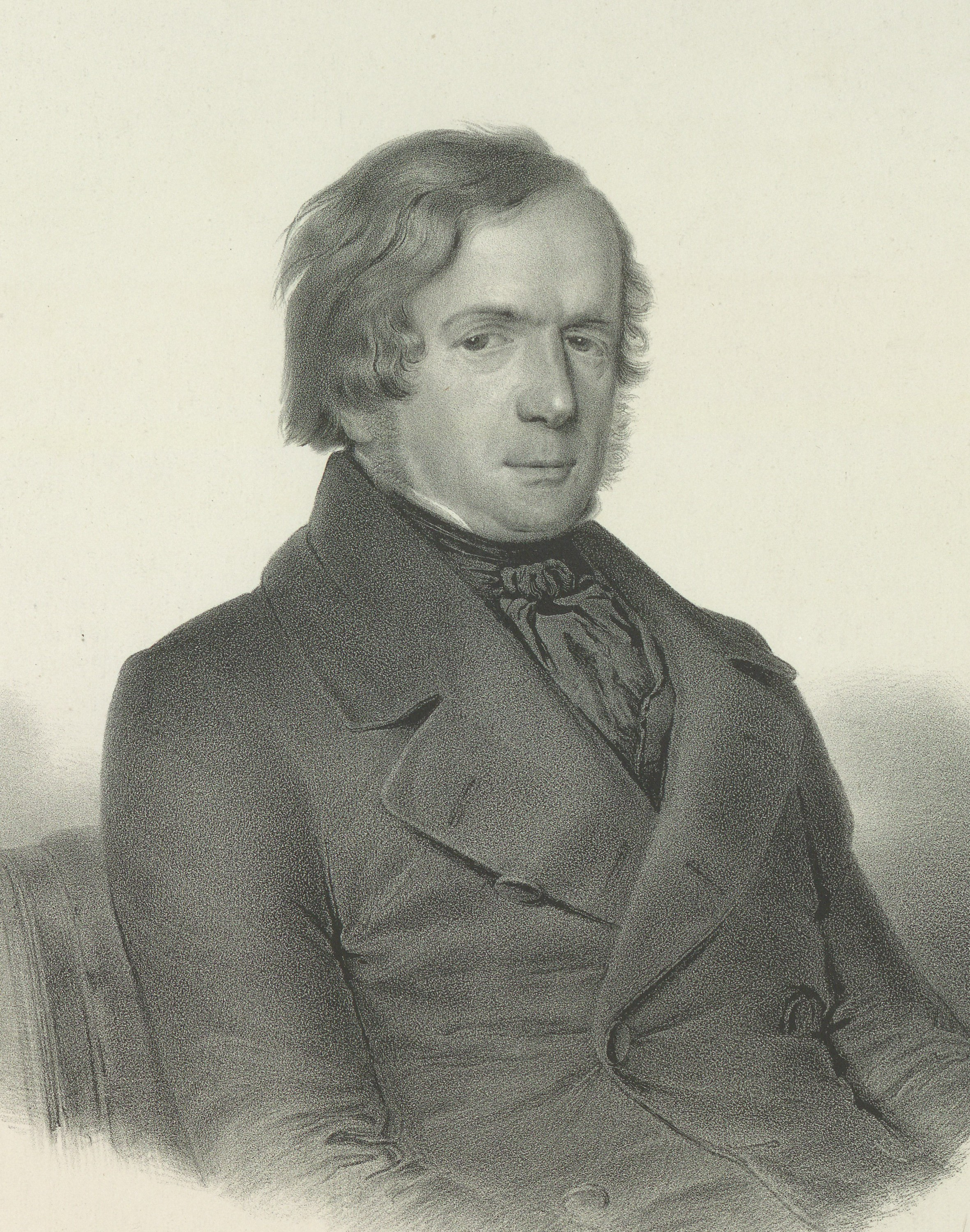
Vincenzo Gioberti

In the 19th century, there were also several other movements which gained some form of popularity in Italy, such as Ontologism. The main Italian son of this philosophical movement was Vincenzo Gioberti (1801–1852), who was a priest and a metaphysician. Gioberti's writings are more important than his political career. In the general history of European philosophy they stand apart. As the speculations of Rosmini-Serbati, against which he wrote, have been called the last link added to medieval thought, so the system of Gioberti, known as Ontologism, more especially in his greater and earlier works, is unrelated to other modern schools of thought. It shows a harmony with the Roman Catholic faith which caused Cousin to declare that Italian philosophy was still in the bonds of theology, and that Gioberti was no philosopher.

Method is with him a synthetic, subjective and psychological instrument. He reconstructs, as he declares, ontology, and begins with the ideal formula, the "Ens" creates ex nihilo the existent. God is the only being (Ens); all other things are merely existences. God is the origin of all human knowledge (called lidea, thought), which is one and so to say identical with God himself. It is directly beheld (intuited) by reason, but in order to be of use it has to be reflected on, and this by means of language. A knowledge of being and existences (concrete, not abstract) and their mutual relations, is necessary as the beginning of philosophy.

Gioberti is in some respects a Platonist. He identifies religion with civilization, and in his treatise Del primato morale e civile degli Italiani arrives at the conclusion that the church is the axis on which the well-being of human life revolves. In it he affirms the idea of the supremacy of Italy, brought about by the restoration of the papacy as a moral dominion, founded on religion and public opinion. In his later works, the Rinnovamento and the Protologia, he is thought by some to have shifted his ground under the influence of events.

His first work, written when he was thirty-seven, had a personal reason for its existence. A young fellow-exile and friend, Paolo Pallia, having many doubts and misgivings as to the reality of revelation and a future life, Gioberti at once set to work with La Teorica del sovrannaturale, which was his first publication (1838). After this, philosophical treatises followed in rapid succession. The Teorica was followed by Introduzione allo studio della filosofia in three volumes (1839–1840). In this work he states his reasons for requiring a new method and new terminology. Here he brings out the doctrine that religion is the direct expression of the idea in this life, and is one with true civilization in history. Civilization is a conditioned mediate tendency to perfection, to which religion is the final completion if carried out; it is the end of the second cycle expressed by the second formula, the Ens redeems existences.

Essays (not published till 1846) on the lighter and more popular subjects, Del bello and Del buono, followed the Introduzione. Del primato morale e civile degli Italiani and the Prolegomeni to the same, and soon afterwards his triumphant exposure of the Jesuits, Il Gesuita moderno, no doubt hastened the transfer of rule from clerical to civil hands. It was the popularity of these semi-political works, increased by other occasional political articles, and his Rinnovamento civile d'Italia, that caused Gioberti to be welcomed with such enthusiasm on his return to his native country. All these works were perfectly orthodox, and aided in drawing the liberal clergy into the movement which has resulted since his time in the unification of Italy. The Jesuits, however, closed round the pope more firmly after his return to Rome, and in the end Gioberti's writings were placed on the Index. The remainder of his works, especially La Filosofia della Rivelazione and the Prolologia, give his mature views on many points.

Other Ontological philosophers include Terenzio Mamiani (1800–1885), Luigi Ferri (1826–1895), and Ausonio Franchi (1821–1895).

=== Hegelianism, Scholasticism and Positivism ===
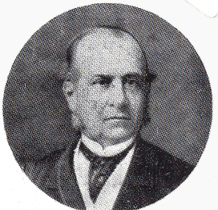
Augusto Vera

Augusto Vera (1813–1885) was probably the greatest Italian Hegelianist philosopher, who composed works in both French and Italian. It was during his studies, with his cousin in Paris, that he learned of philosophy and through them he acquired knowledge of Hegelianism and it culminated during the events of the 1848–49 French revolution. In England he continued his studies of Hegelian philosophy. During his years in Naples, he would maintain relationships with the Philosophical Society of Berlin, which originally consisted of Hegelians, and kept up to date with both the German and the French Hegelian literature. As a teacher, he undertook the translation of Hegel's Introduzione alla filosofia (Introduction to philosophy) in French.

Neo-Hegelian theories were revitalized not only by Vera but also by Bertrando Spaventa (1817–1883), who reformed Hegelian dialectics within the framework of Kant's transcendental self-consciousness, introducing other original themes from the indigenous Italian tradition, such as historicism.

In the mid-19th century, other Hegelians of the Risorgimento, active especially in Naples, included de Sanctis, Fiorentino, De Meis. These were contrasted by positivist thinkers such as Pasquale Villari, or by more conservative thinkers linked to Platonism, interested in scholastic thought that began once again to flourish, in large part in reaction against the Modernism inspired by thinkers such as René Descartes, Immanuel Kant and Georg Hegel, whose principles were perceived to conflict with Christian dogma. This was particularly vigorous at first in Italy. "The direct initiator of the neo-Scholastic movement in Italy was Gaetano Sanseverino (1811–1865), a canon at Naples." The influential German Jesuit Joseph Kleutgen (1811–83), who taught at Rome, argued that post-Cartesian philosophy undermined Catholic theology, and that its remedy was the Aristotelian scientific method of Aquinas. From 1874 to 1891, the Accademia di San Tommaso of Rome published the review La Scienza Italiana. Numerous works were produced by Giovanni Maria Cornoldi (1822–92), Giuseppe Pecci, Tommaso Maria Zigliara (1833–93), Francesco Satolli (1839–1909), Matteo Liberatore (1810–92), Alberto Barberis (1847–96), Santo Schiffini (1841–1906), Salvatore Talamo, Antonio Ballerini, Guido Mattiussi and others. The Italian writers at first laid special emphasis on the metaphysics of Scholasticism, and less on the empirical sciences or the history of philosophy.

The two main figures of nineteenth century Italian positivism were Carlo Cattaneo (1801–69) and Roberto Ardigò (1828–1920). Ardigò introduced the fundamental themes of European positivism into Italian culture. Influenced to a large extent by Spencer, he maintained that concrete, scientifically verifiable experiences constituted the outer limit of any philosophical theory of reality. Ardigò's "positive philosophy" was a synthesis of various philosophical and scientific theories, including positivism, evolutionism, and spiritualism. Inspired by Auguste Comte, Ardigò differed from Comte in that he considered thought more important than matter. He believed thought was dominant in every action and the result of every action, and that it disappears only in a state of general corruption. His treatise La psicologia come scienza positiva (1870) is an important contribution to the birth of modern European psychology, showing the influence of Darwin and John Stuart Mill and proposing that psychic phenomena depend on physiological ones. His writings on pedagogy and moral philosophy (many put on the Index by the Church) include La morale dei positivisti (1879), in which he argues that morality is independent of religion and criticizes contemporary spiritualism. In the twentieth century, positivist thinking was continued by the Italian school of criminology, particularly Cesare Lombroso (1835–1909) and Enrico Ferri (1846–1929).

== Modern, contemporary and 20th-century philosophy ==
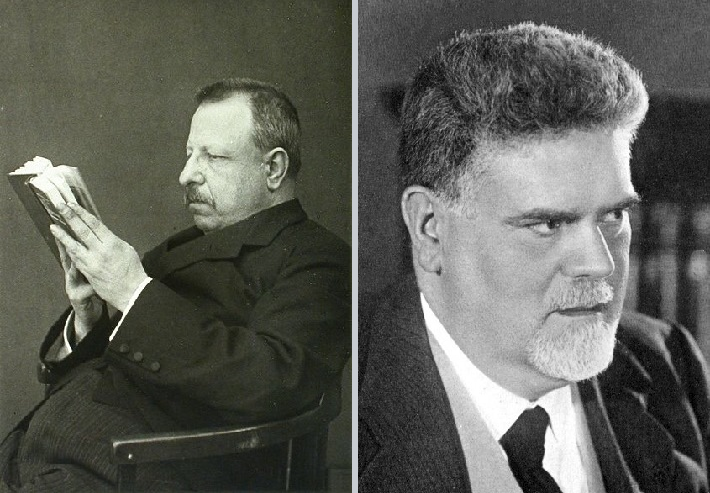
Benedetto Croce (left) and Giovanni Gentile (right), the two greatest exponents of the Italian idealism

Some of the most prominent philosophies and ideologies in Italy during the late 19th and 20th centuries included anarchism, communism, socialism, futurism, fascism, idealism, and Christian democracy. Both futurism and fascism (in its original form, now often distinguished as Italian fascism) were developed in Italy at this time. From the 1920s to the 1940s, Italian Fascism was the official philosophy and ideology of the Italian government. Giovanni Gentile was one of the greatest Italian 20th-century Idealist/Fascist philosophers, who greatly supported Benito Mussolini. He had great a number of developments within his thought and career which defined his philosophy.

- The discovery of Actual Idealism in his work Theory of the Pure Act (1903)
- The political favour he felt for the invasion of Libya (1911) and the entry of Italy into World War I (1915)
- The dispute with Benedetto Croce over the historic inevitability of Fascism.
- His role as education minister (1923)
- His belief that Fascism could be made to be subservient to his thought and the gathering of influence through the work of such students as Ugo Spirito.

Benedetto Croce, one of the greatest Italian 20th-century Idealist philosophers, wrote that Gentile "...holds the honor of having been the most rigorous neo–Hegelian in the entire history of Western philosophy and the dishonor of having been the official philosopher of Fascism in Italy." His philosophical basis for fascism was rooted in his understanding of ontology and epistemology, in which he found vindication for the rejection of individualism, acceptance of collectivism, with the state as the ultimate location of authority and loyalty to which the individual found in the conception of individuality no meaning outside of the state (which in turn justified totalitarianism). Ultimately, Gentile foresaw a social order wherein opposites of all kinds weren't to be given sanction as existing independently from each other; that 'publicness' and 'privateness' as broad interpretations were currently false as imposed by all former kinds of Government; capitalism, communism, and that only the reciprocal totalitarian state of Corporative Syndicalism, a Fascist state, could defeat these problems made from reifying as an external that which is in fact to Gentile only a thinking reality. Whereas it was common in the philosophy of the time to see conditional subject as abstract and object as concrete, Gentile postulated the opposite, that subject was the concrete and objectification was abstraction (or rather; that what was conventionally dubbed "subject" was in fact only conditional object, and that true subject was the 'act of' being or essence above any object).

Gentile was a notable philosophical theorist of his time throughout Europe, since having developed his 'Actual Idealism' system of Idealism, sometimes called 'Actualism.' It was especially in which his ideas put subject to the position of a transcending truth above positivism that garnered attention; by way that all senses about the world only take the form of ideas within one's mind in any real sense; to Gentile even the analogy between the function & location of the physical brain with the functions of the physical body were a consistent creation of the mind (and not brain; which was a creation of the mind and not the other way around). An example of Actual Idealism in Theology is the idea that although man may have invented the concept of God, it does not make God any less real in any sense possible as far as it is not presupposed to exist as abstraction and except in case qualities about what existence actually entails (i.e. being invented apart from the thinking making it) are presupposed. Benedetto Croce objected that Gentile's "pure act" is nothing other than Schopenhauer's will. Therefore, Gentile proposed a form of what he called 'absolute Immanentism' in which the divine was the present conception of reality in the totality of one's individual thinking as an evolving, growing and dynamic process. Many times accused of Solipsism, Gentile maintained his philosophy to be a Humanism that sensed the possibility of nothing beyond what was contingent; the self's human thinking, in order to communicate as immanence is to be human like oneself, made a cohesive empathy of the self-same, without an external division, and therefore not modeled as objects to one's own thinking.

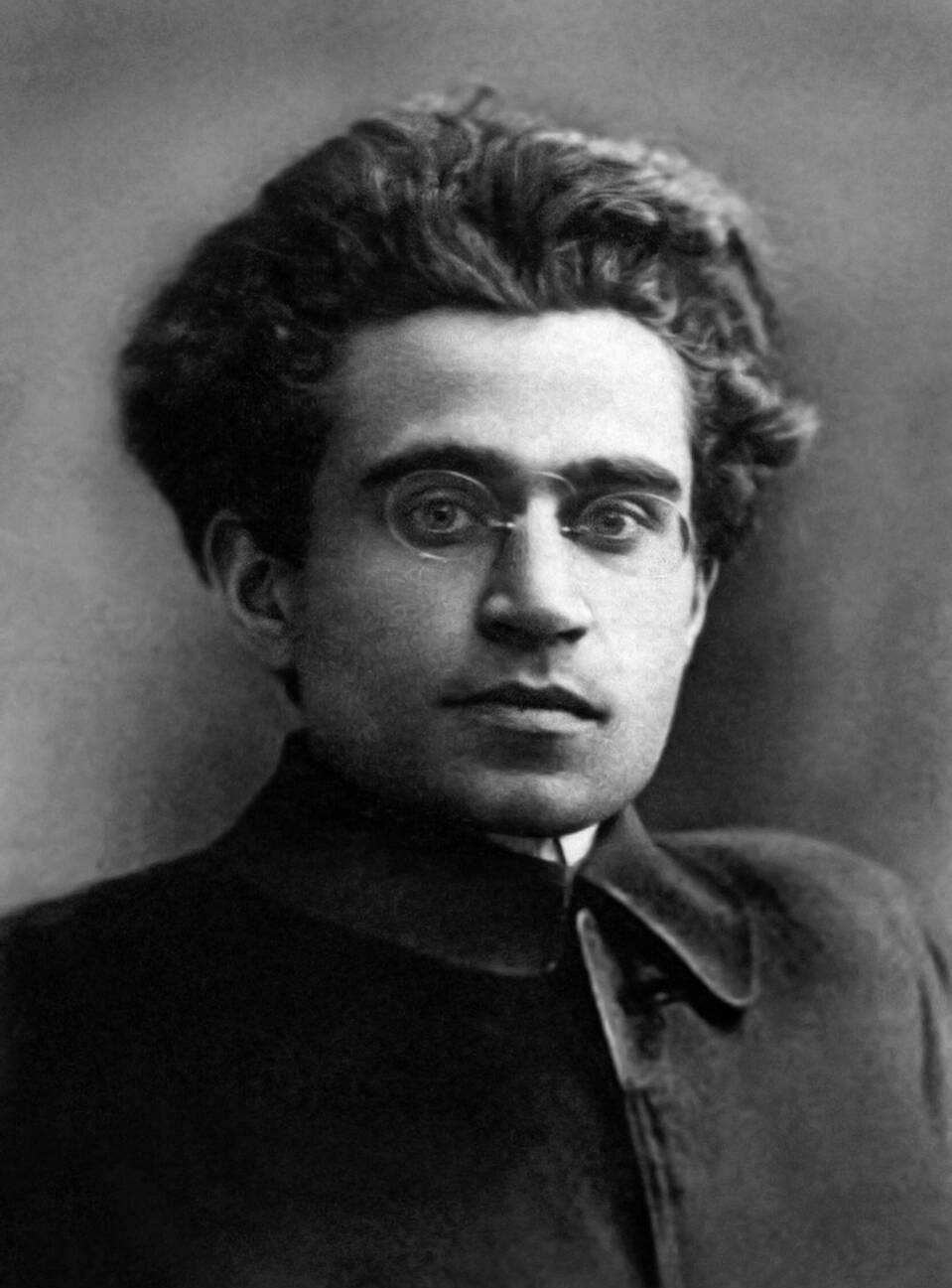
Antonio Gramsci

Meanwhile, anarchism, communism, and socialism, though not originating in Italy, took significant hold in Italy during the early 20th century, with the country producing numerous significant figures in anarchist, socialist, and communist thought. In addition, anarcho-communism first fully formed into its modern strain within the Italian section of the First International. Italian anarchists often adhered to forms of anarcho-communism, illegalist or insurrectionary anarchism, collectivist anarchism, anarcho-syndicalism, and platformism. Some of the most important figures in the late 19th and 20th century anarchist movement include Italians such as Errico Malatesta, Giuseppe Fanelli, Carlo Cafiero, Alfredo M. Bonanno, Renzo Novatore, Pietro Gori, Luigi Galleani, Severino Di Giovanni, Giuseppe Ciancabilla, Luigi Fabbri, Camillo Berneri, and Sacco and Vanzetti. Other Italian figures influential in both the anarchist and socialist movements include Carlo Tresca and Andrea Costa, as well as the author, director, and intellectual Pier Paolo Pasolini. Antonio Gramsci remains an important philosopher within Marxist and communist theory, credited with creating the theory of cultural hegemony. Italian philosophers were also influential in the development of the non-Marxist liberal socialism philosophy, including Carlo Rosselli, Norberto Bobbio, Piero Gobetti, Aldo Capitini, and Guido Calogero; Gianni Vattimo borders this tradition, defending a "weak Marxism", as part of his pensiero debole (weak thought) take on hermeneutics. 21st century post-marxist philosophers include Giorgio Agamben and Antonio Negri.In the 1960s, many Italian left-wing activists adopted the anti-authoritarian pro-working class leftist theories that would become known as autonomism and operaismo.

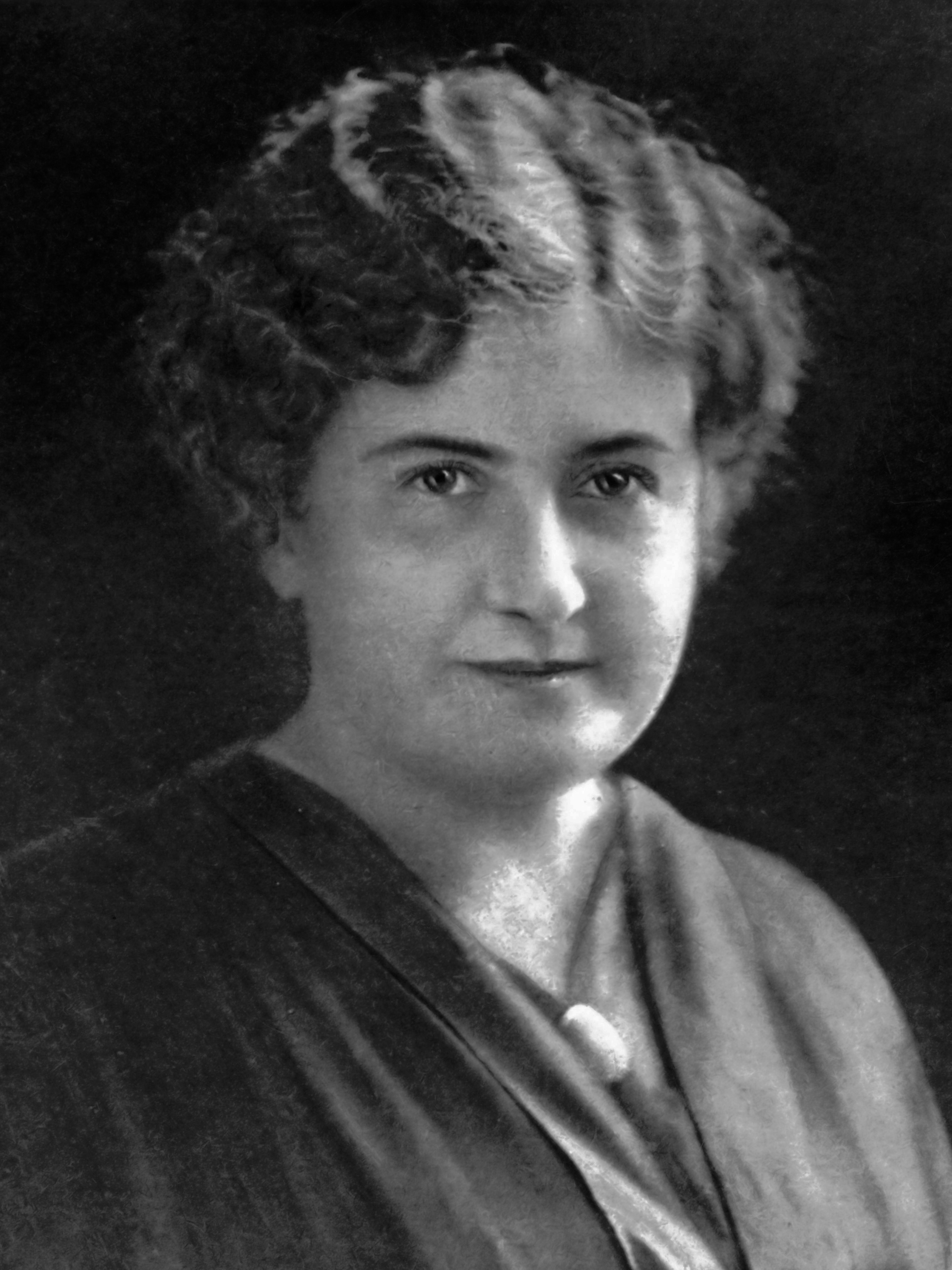
Maria Montessori

Important scholars and specialists include Giovanni Reale and Enrico Berti in Ancient philosophy; Franco Volpi and Diego Giordano in German philosophy, Umberto Eco in semiotics and narrative theory, Maurizio Ferraris in hermeneutics and ontology. Cornelio Fabro (1911–95), made major scholarly contributions to the study of Aquinas, drawing attention to Platonic elements in Thomism (such as ‘participation’), later an emphasis for Anglican Thomists such as Mascall and figures associated with the Radical Orthodoxy movement. Early and important Italian feminists include Sibilla Aleramo, Alaide Gualberta Beccari, and Anna Maria Mozzoni, though proto-feminist philosophies had previously been touched upon by earlier Italian writers such as Christine de Pizan, Moderata Fonte, Lucrezia Marinella. The Italian physician and educator Maria Montessori is credited with the creation of the philosophy of education that bears her name, an educational philosophy now practiced throughout the world.

The Montessori method of education is a system of education for children that seeks to develop natural interests and activities rather than use formal teaching methods. A Montessori classroom places an emphasis on hands-on learning and developing real-world skills. It was developed by physician Maria Montessori. It emphasizes independence and it views children as naturally eager for knowledge and capable of initiating learning in a sufficiently supportive and well-prepared learning environment. It discourages some conventional measures of achievement, such as grades and tests. Montessori developed her theories in the early 20th century through scientific experimentation with her students; the method has since been used in many parts of the world, in public and private schools alike.

A range of practices exists under the name "Montessori", which is not trademarked. Popular elements include mixed-age classrooms, student freedom (including their choices of activity), long blocks of uninterrupted work time, specially trained teachers and prepared environment. Scientific studies regarding the Montessori method are mostly positive, with a 2017 review stating that "broad evidence" exists for its efficacy.

The Italian mathematician Giuseppe Peano can be considered as one of the inspirers of contemporary philosophy of mathematic and analytic philosophy above all thanks to the influence he had on the thought of Bertrand Russell. Ludovico Geymonat and Francesco Barone also contributed to the birth of analytic philosophy in Italy by introducing the work of the Vienna Circle and Logical Positivism.

Recent Italian analytic philosophers, many of whom work abroad, include Evandro Agazzi, Francesco Berto, Claudia Bianchi, Cristina Bicchieri, Emiliano Boccardi, Roberto Casati, Annalisa Coliva, Franca D'Agostini, Maria Luisa Dalla Chiara, Mauro Dorato, Luciano Floridi, Pieranna Garavaso, Aldo Gargani, Giulio Giorello, Luca Incurvati, Lorenzo Magnani, Diego Marconi, Michela Massimi, Luca Moretti, Gloria Origgi, Carlo Penco, Marcello Pera, Eva Picardi, Gualtiero Piccinini, Stefano Predelli, Marina Sbisà, Alessandra Tanesini, Alessandro Torza, Laura Valentini, Achille Varzi, and Nicla Vassallo.

== See also ==
- Ancient Roman philosophy
- Italian idealism
- List of Italian philosophers
