= Italian idealism =

Late 19th and early 20th century italian philosophy inspired by German idealism

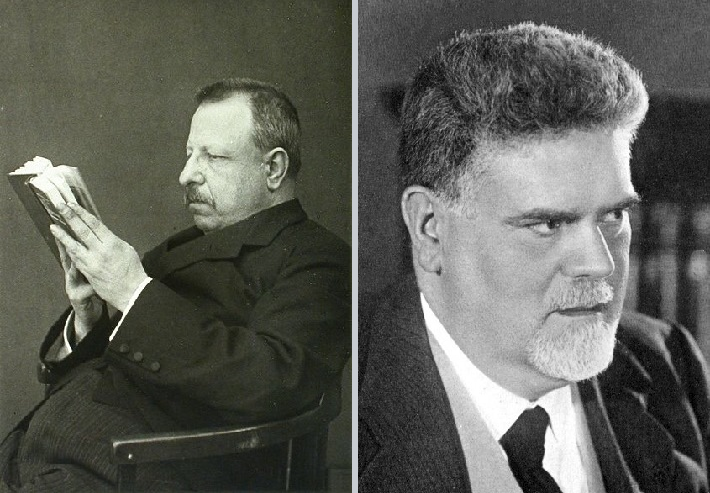
Benedetto Croce and Giovanni Gentile

Italian idealism, born from interest in the German movement and particularly in Hegelian doctrine, developed in Italy starting from the spiritualism of the nineteenth-century Risorgimento tradition, and culminated in the first half of the twentieth century in its two greatest exponents: Benedetto Croce and Giovanni Gentile.

== Risorgimento spiritualism and Hegelianism ==
In the age of Romanticism, Italian patriots' philosophical circles tried to give a spiritual, moral and ideal imprint to the historical path towards national unification.

Initially, both Antonio Rosmini (1797–1855) and Vincenzo Gioberti (1801–1852) revived the Augustinian neoplatonic themes of the interiority of conscience and divine illumination, but the former aspired to reform Kantianism in an ontological and transcendent sense, the latter more oriented towards countering the subjectivism of modern philosophy emerging from Descartes, reaffirming the objective preeminence of God, or "Entity-Idea", on which to build an ontologism understood in an almost pantheistic manner.

Later, the revolutionary and liberal tendencies of the Risorgimento bourgeoisie, especially in Naples, found in Hegelian idealism the way to a cultural and ideological renewal of the country.

The interest in the Hegelian doctrine in Italy spread especially for the works of Augusto Vera (1813–1885) and Bertrando Spaventa (1817–1883), without omitting also the importance of the studies on Hegelian "Aesthetic" by Francesco De Sanctis (1817–1883), author of the History of Italian Literature.

De Sanctis's concept of art and of literary history, inspired by Hegel, will stimulate the genesis of Crocian idealism.

Augusto Vera, author of writings and commentaries about Hegel, was a famous philosopher in Europe, who interpreted the Hegelian Absolute in a religious and transcendent sense.

An opposite interpretation was formulated by the neo-hegelian Bertrand Spaventa, for whom the Spirit was immanent in the history of philosophy.

Reconstructing the development of Italian philosophy, Spaventa argued that Italian Renaissance thought of Bruno and Campanella had been at the origin of modern philosophy, but had stopped due to the Counter-Reformation. Its task now was to catch up with European philosophy, linking up with Vico's mind philosophy, which along with those of Galluppi, Rosmini, and Gioberti, had anticipated themes of Kantism and German idealism.

Se la filosofia non è una vana esercitazione dell'intelletto, ma quella forma reale della vita umana, nella quale si compendiano e trovano il loro vero significato tutti i momenti anteriori dello spirito, è cosa naturale che un popolo libero si riconosca e abbia la vera coscienza di se stesso anche ne' suoi filosofi.

Translation:

If philosophy is not a vain exercise of the intellect, but the real form of human life within which are compounded and find their true meaning all the past moments of the spirit, then it is natural for a free people to recognize itself and find the true conscience of itself in its own philosophers.

Spaventa reformulated the Hegelian dialectic, reinterpreting it from the perspective of Kantian and Fichtian conscientialism or subjectivism. He considered the act of thinking prevalent with respect to the phases of objectification and synthesis. That is, he supported the need to «mentalise» Hegel, because the Mind is the protagonist of every original production. The synthesis of the actual thinking of the Spirit was then placed by Spaventa, as the only reality, not only after the hegelian moments of Idea and of Nature, but so as to permeate them also from the beginning.

== The idealisms of Gentile and Croce ==
After a parenthesis characterized by positivism, in 1913 Giovanni Gentile (1875–1944) with the publication of The reform of Hegelian dialectics resumed Spaventa's interpretation of the Hegelian Idea, seeing in Hegelian Spirit the category of becoming as coinciding with the pure act of thought in which the whole reality of nature, history and spirit was transfused. Every thing exists only in the mental act of thinking it: there are no single empirical entities separated from the transcendental consciousness; even the past lives only in the actual, present moment of memory. To Gentile, who considered himself the "philosopher of Fascism", actual idealism was the sole remedy to philosophically preserving free agency, by making the act of thinking self-creative, and, therefore, without any contingency and not in the potency of any other fact.

Gentile reproached Hegel for having built his dialectic with elements proper to "thought", that is to say that of determined thought and of the sciences. For Gentile, instead, only in "thinking in action" is dialectical self-consciousness that includes everything.

Una concezione idealistica mira a concepire lo stesso assoluto, il tutto, come idea: ed è perciò intrinsecamente idealismo assoluto. Ma assoluto l'idealismo non può essere se l'idea non coincide con lo stesso atto del conoscerla; perché - è questa la più profonda origine delle difficoltà in cui si dibatte il platonismo - se l'idea non fosse lo stesso atto per cui l'idea si conosce, l'idea lascerebbe fuori di sè qualche cosa, e l'idealismo pertanto non sarebbe più assoluto.

Translation:

An idealistic conception aims at conceiving the absolute, the whole, as an idea, and is therefore intrinsically absolute idealism. But absolute it cannot be unless the idea coincides with the act of knowing it, because — and here we find the very root of the difficulty in which Platonism is entangled — were the idea not the act itself through which it is known, it would leave something outside itself, and the idealism would then no longer be absolute.

Gentile made a pivotal distinction to factors concerning Idealism's own criteria for reality, which have stood since Berkeley's adage «esse est percipi» by distinguishing between the concrete real «act of thinking» (pensiero pensante), and the abstract «static thought» (pensiero pensato).

To his actual vision was opposed since 1913 Benedetto Croce (1866–1952, cousin of Bertrando Spaventa) who in his Essay on Hegel interpreted Hegelian thought as immanentist historicism: he also understood the Hegelian dialectic of the opposites in a different way, integrating it with that of the «distincts». According to Croce, in fact, the life of the Spirit also consists of autonomous moments that are not opposed, but rather distinct, that is:

- "Art", intuitive knowledge of the particular, which aims to beauty;
- "Philosophy", logical knowledge of the universal, which aims to truth;
- "Economy", volition of the particular, which aims to usefulness;
- "Ethics", volition of the universal, which aims to good.

Referring to Giambattista Vico, Croce identified philosophy with history, understood not as a capricious sequence of events, but the implementation of Reason, in the light of which it becomes possible the historical understanding of the genesis of facts, and their simultaneous justification with her own unfolding.

La storia non è mai giustiziera, ma sempre giustificatrice; e giustiziera non potrebbe farsi se non facendosi ingiusta, ossia confondendo il pensiero con la vita, e assumendo come giudizio del pensiero le attrazioni e le repulsioni del sentimento.

Translation:

History never metes out justice, but always justifies; she could not carry out the former act without making herself unjust — that is to say, confounding thought with life, taking the attractions and repulsions of sentiment for the judgments of thought.

Historian's task is therefore to overcome every form of emotionality towards the studied matter, and to present it in form of knowledge, without referring to good or evil. Croce also affirmed the contemporaneity of history, since any event or problem from the past becomes present the moment it is studied and thought about. In spirit thus philosophy and history coincide, so that the latter is an ever-living progress toward freedom: «Life and reality are history, and nothing but history».

== Other idealists ==
Among the other exponents of this idealistic era in Italy, there was Guido De Ruggiero (1888–1948), a student of Croce and Gentile, who saw in State institutions the privileged place for the manifestation and development of the hegelian Spirit, in a continuous process towards a growing self-awareness and realization of the Idea. He derived from it an idealism of a social liberal nature, thanks to which the possession of history helps one not to be possessed or conditioned by it.

Other students of Gentile were divided between a "left-wing" orientation, such as Ugo Spirito (1896–1979) who defended actualist immanentism to the point of adopting so-called "problematicism", and a right-wing orientation, such as Armando Carlini (1878–1959), and later Augusto Del Noce (1910–1989), who advocated the need for openness to religious transcendence. Adolfo Omodeo (1889–1946) instead brought about a convergence between Croce's idealistic historicism and Gentile's actualism, uniting historical knowledge of thought and creative action in the synthesis of the spirit.

Finally, outside of academic idealism, the esotericist Julius Evola (1898–1974) aimed to transform philosophical theory into practical realization, something that for him could only occur in the magical-hermetic dimension, that is, in a magical idealism, the term he gave to his metaphysical system.

After having characterized Italian philosophical culture for over forty years, after the Second World War the neo-idealism entered a crisis, replaced by existentialism, neo-positivism, phenomenology, and marxism, of which the chief exponent, Antonio Gramsci, was partly indebted to the input of Italian idealism.

== See also ==
- Actual idealism
- Giovanni Gentile
- Benedetto Croce
- Bertrando Spaventa
- Italian philosophy
- Neo-hegelianism
