= Giorgio Raguseo =

Italian philosopher, theologist, and orator

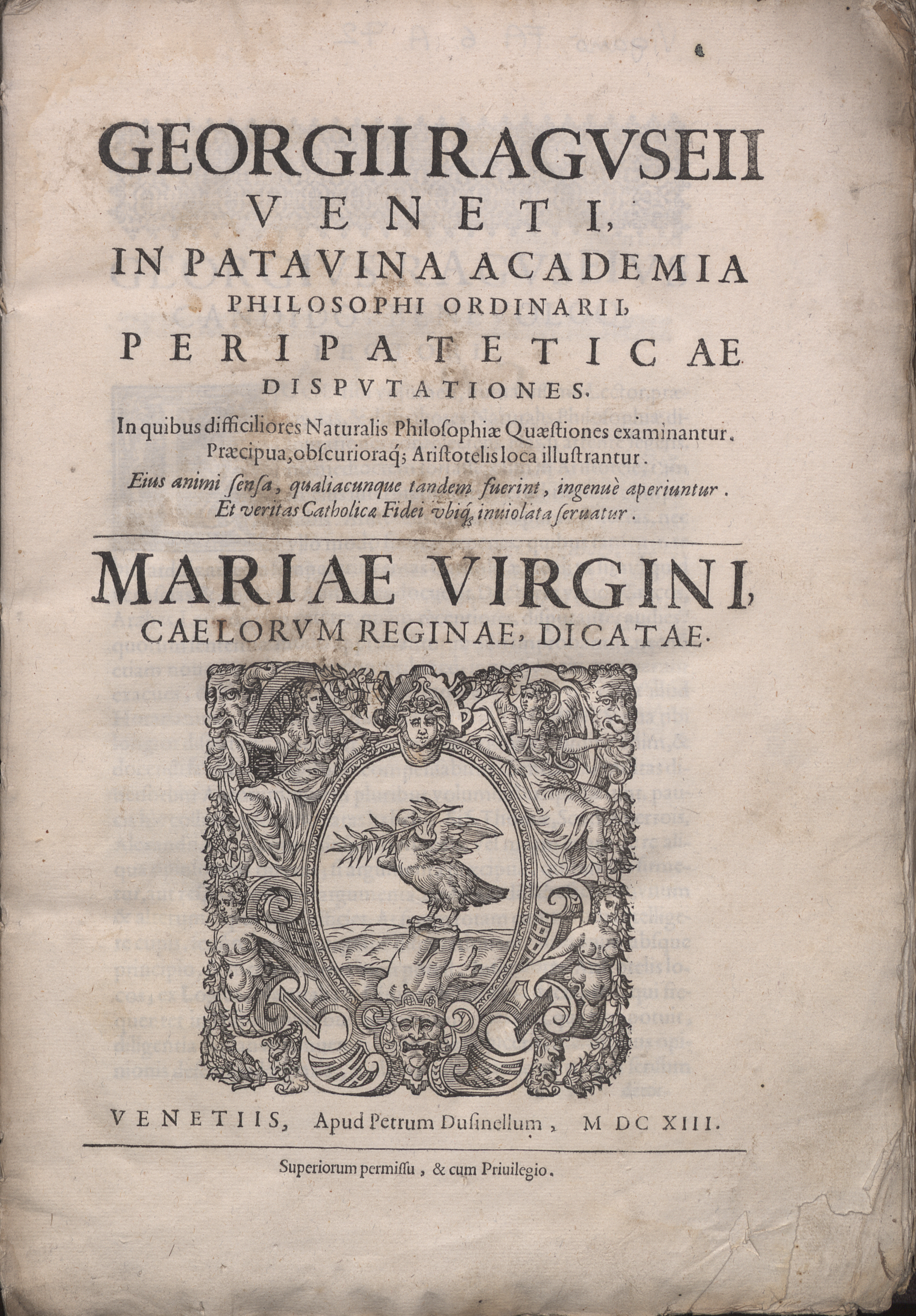
Title page of the Peripateticae disputationes (1613)

Giorgio Raguseo (1580–1622) was an Italian philosopher, theologist, and orator from the Republic of Venice.

Born an illegitimate child in Dubrovnik (formerly Ragusa), Croatia, Raguseo had to beg before being taken to Venice by a gentleman who provided him an education. He became a priest and taught at the University of Padua.

== Biography ==
Born in Dubrovnik, as an illegitimate child, he was forced to beg before being taken to Venice by a gentleman who gave him an education. He became a priest and taught at the University of Padua.

He had a famous dispute with his colleague Cesare Cremonini (philosopher) on the nature of the elements, the value of Aristotle interpretations, and educational issues.

== Works ==
- Peripateticae disputationes (in Latin). Venice: Pietro Dusinelli. 1613.

== See also ==
- Aristotelianism
- Cesare Cremonini
- Italian philosophy
- Renaissance philosophy
