= Spaventa =

Spaventa is an Italian surname. Notable people with the surname include:

- Bertrando Spaventa (1817–1883), Italian philosopher
- Luigi Spaventa (1934–2013), Italian academic
- Silvio Spaventa (1822–1893), Italian journalist, politician and statesman
