= Pieranna Garavaso =

American philosopher

Pieranna Garavaso is an analytic philosopher and professor emerita at the University of Minnesota Morris. Her areas of interest include epistemological and metaphysical issues in philosophy of mathematics, philosophy of language, Ludwig Wittgenstein, Gottlob Frege, Bertrand Russell, and feminist epistemology. She received her doctorate in philosophy from the University of Nebraska–Lincoln. She is the recipient of two distinguished teaching awards: the University of Minnesota, Morris Alumni Association Teaching Award in 2003 and the Horace T. Morse University of Minnesota Alumni in 2004.

== Publications ==
=== Books ===
- The Bloomsbury Companion to Analytic Feminism, Bloomsbury Academic, June 2018.
- Frege on Thinking and Its Epistemic Significance, coauthored with Nicla Vassallo, Lexington Books, Lanham, November 2014.
- Filosofia delle donne (Philosophy of Women), coauthored with Nicla Vassallo, Laterza, Roma-Bari, 2007; first reprint September 2007.
- Filosofia della matematica. Numeri e strutture (Philosophy of Mathematics. Numbers and Structures), Guerini, Milan (Italy), 1998.

=== Articles ===
- "Psychological Continuity and Trauma," The Journal of Philosophical Research, 39(2014), 101-125.
- "Four Theses in Frege," Paradigmi, 3 (2013): 43-59.
- "Hilary Putnam's Consistency Objection Against Wittgenstein's Conventionalism in Mathematics," Philosophia Mathematica, (III), 00 (2013): 1-18.
- "Il destino di Karen. Università e donne nel Nord America" (Karen's Fate. Academe and Women in North America), Diogene, Vol. 4, 16(September–November 2009), pp. 44–46.
- "Scienza," in Donna m'apparve, Codice Edizioni 2009, pp. 117–130.
- "Editor's Introduction," in Philip Hugly and Charles Sayward, Arithmetic and Ontology: A Non-Realist Philosophy of Mathematics, Monograph-in-Debate Series of The Poznan Studies in the Philosophy of the Sciences and the Humanities, vol. 90, Amsterdam/New York, NY: Rodopi, 2006, pp. 11–20.
- "On Frege's Alleged Indispensability Argument," in Philosophia Mathematica (III) 13(2005), pp. 160–173.
- "Esiste una condizione necessaria per la razionalitá?" (Is there a necessary condition for rationality?), in Esperienza e razionalitá. Prospettive contemporanee, edited by Roberta Corvi, Franco Angeli, Milan, 2005, pp. 127–143.
- "On Behalf of the Neglected Body," in Ikaheimo, Kotkavirta, Laitinen, and Lyyra, eds., Personhood. workshop Papers of the Conference "Dimensions of Personhood," University of Jyväskylä, Finland, 2004, pp. 54–60.
- "On the Virtues and Plausibility of Feminist Epistemologies," Epistemologia, (coauthored with Nicla Vassallo), Vol. XXVI (2003), pp.99-132.
- "Filosofia della Matematica" (Philosophy of Mathematics), Storia della filosofia analitica (History of Analytic Philosophy), Einaudi, Turin (Italy), 2002.
- "La Varietà delle epistemologie femministe" (The Variety of Feminist Epistemologies), Donne e filosofia (Women and Philosophy), Erga, 2001, pp. 218–233.
- "Why the New Theorist May still Need to Explain Cognitive Significance but not Mind Doing It," Philosophia Vol. 28 (2000), pp. 1–11.
- "Mens Una in Corpore Uno," Identità personale: un dibattito aperto (Personal Identity: an open debate), Andrea Bottani and Nicla Vassallo, eds. Loffredo, Naples 2000, pp. 281–309.
- "The Quine/Wittgenstein Controversy: Any Role for Feminist Empiricism in It?," Epistemologia, Vol. XXII (1999), pp.63–90.
- "Il controverso rapporto fra naturalismo e femminismo" (The Controversial Relationship Between Naturalism and Feminism), in E. Agazzi and N. Vassallo, eds., Introduzione al Naturalismo (Introduction to Naturalism), Franco Angeli, March 1998.
- "The Distinction Between the Logical and the Empirical in On Certainty," Philosophical Investigations, 1998.
- "Actuality and Necessity," The Journal of Critical Analysis, vol. 9, No. 2 (1992). pp. 173–187.
- "Anti-Realism and Objectivity in Wittgenstein's Philosophy of Mathematics," Philosophica, 48 (1991, 2), 93-106.
- "Frege on the Analysis of Thoughts," History and Philosophy of Logic, 12 (1991), 195-210.
- "Taylor's Defense of Two Traditional Arguments for the Existence of God," Sophia, (co-authored with Lory Lemke), vol. 29, no. 1, April 1990, pp. 31–41.
- "Wittgenstein's Philosophy of Mathematics: A Reply to Two Objections," Southern Journal of Philosophy, vol. 26, 1988, pp. 179–191.

== Reviews of Garavaso's work ==
- Jose Maria Ariso, "El efecto de la experiencia sobre la reestructuración de los sistemas de creencias de Quine y Wittgenstein" ("The effect of experience on the restructuration of Quine's and Wittgenstein's systems of beliefs"), LOGOS. Anales del Seminario de Metafísica Vol. 41 (2008): 239-258.
- Daniele Moyal-Sharrock, "Wittgenstein Distinguished: A Response to Pieranna Garavaso," Philosophical Investigations, Volume 23, Number 1, January 2000, pp. 54–69(16).
- "Some Objections to Garavaso's Wittgenstein", The Southern Journal of Philosophy (1991) Volume XXIX, No. 3.
