= Actual idealism =

Philosophical system of Giovanni Gentile

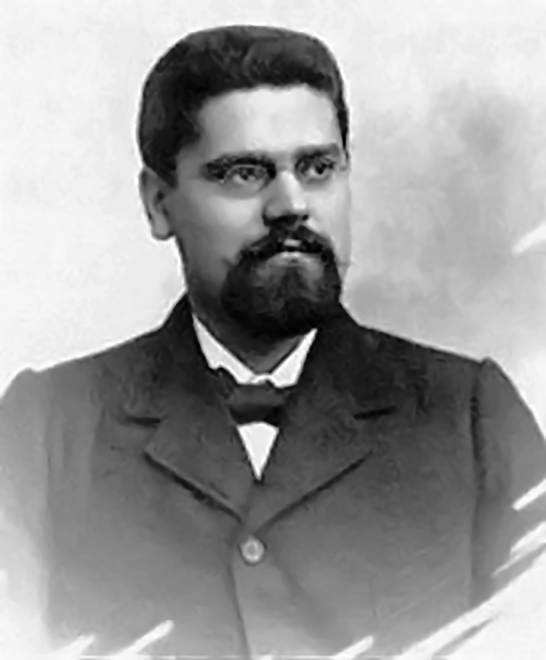
Italian philosopher Giovanni Gentile, who developed actual idealism. It contrasted the transcendental idealism of Kant and the absolute idealism of Hegel.

Actual idealism is a form of idealism, developed by Giovanni Gentile, that was influenced by the absolute idealism of G. W. F. Hegel.

== Doctrine ==
Gentile calls his philosophy "actualism" or "actual idealism", because, in it, the only true reality is the pure act of the "thinking that thinks", i.e. self-consciousness in the present moment, in which the spirit that comprises all existing is manifested. Reality lies in the productive and self-creative act of thinking, rather than in the object thought.

The Spirit is Thought, and Thought is a perennial activity in which there is no distinction between subject and object. Gentile therefore opposes any dualism and naturalism claiming the unity of nature and spirit (monism), that is spirit and matter within the thinking consciousness, giving it a gnoseological and ontological primacy. Consciousness is seen as a synthesis of subject and object, synthesis of an act in which the first places the second. Therefore, they do not make sense only spiritualist or only materialist orientations, as it does not have the clear division between spirit and matter of Platonism, as reality is unique: here is evident the influence of Renaissance pantheism and Brunian immanentism, more than Hegelianism.

Unlike Benedetto Croce (proponent of absolute historicism or historicist idealism for which all reality is "history" and not an act in the Aristotelian sense) Gentile appreciates Hegel not so much the historicist horizon, as the idealistic system based on consciousness as a "transcendental subject", or the assumption of consciousness as the principle of reality, a position that brings him closer to Fichte. Also according to Gentile there is an error, in Hegel, in the setting of the dialectic, but in a different way from Croce: Hegel would have built his dialectic with elements of the "thought", or that of the determined thought and science. For Gentile, on the other hand, only in the "thinking in action" consists the dialectical self-consciousness that encompasses everything, while the "thought" is an illusory fact.

Gentile's actualism therefore aims to reform the Hegelian dialectic, to make it an authentically absolute idealism, with the addition of the theory of the pure act and the explication of the relationship between "logic of thinking" and "logic of thought."

An idealist conception aims at conceiving the absolute itself, the whole, as an idea: it is thus an intrinsically absolute idealism. But idealism cannot be absolute if the idea does not coincide with the very act of knowing it; because - this is the deepest origin of the difficulties in which Platonism struggles - if the idea were not the very act by which the idea is known, the idea would leave something outside itself, and idealism would therefore no longer be absolute.

— Giovanni Gentile, Teoria generale dello spirito, chap. XVII, § 1

Taking up Fichte, the philosopher asserts that the spirit is foundational insofar as it is the unity of consciousness and self-consciousness, thought in act; the act of thinking thought, or "pure act," is the principle and form of becoming reality, outside of which there is nothing: there are no empirical individuals separate from the absolute I; error, evil, and death have no consistency before Truth and the Eternal; even the past lives only in the present moment of remembrance.

According to Gentile, the dialectic of the pure act is implemented in particular in the opposition between the subjectivity represented by art (thesis) and the objectivity represented by religion (antithesis) to which philosophy (synthesis) provides the solution. The "logic of thinking thought," understood as an archetypal-ontological instance, is a philosophical and dialectical logic; the "logic of thought thought," on the other hand, is formal and erroneous, because the individual thoughts coming from original thinking are merely a contemplative reflection, a kind of "by-product.".

=== Abstract thought and concrete thought ===
Reality is thus not a fact, a factual and static datum, but an act, an action of the spirit, a dynamic activity endowed with an infinite power. Potentiality and actuality are to be understood here not so much in the Aristotelian sense as in the Neoplatonist sense borrowed from German idealism.

Although realists admit that the external world is the only knowable one, enclosable within a "static" concept based on the repeatability of experience that would testify to the existence of a solid basis transcending the mutability of our perceptions, they continue to dogmatically assume that there is something real independently of the thought that thinks it.

But a reality thought of as a "presupposition of thought," that is, thought of as "unthought" (being external, prior to thought), is a contradictory, dogmatic, and arbitrary concept that corresponds to the empirical point of view. Empiricism is an abstract point of view, because it separates the object from the ego, from the subject that posits it, and thus "abstracts" a part from the whole. The only concrete reality is the unitary synthesis of subject-object, which Gentile calls self-consciousness, in which it is possible to recompose the opposition between "thinking thought" and "thought thought", between "act" and "fact", or according to Gentile's terminology, between "concrete logos" and "abstract logos".

=== Immediacy and mediation ===
The actual self-consciousness of thought is not immediate subjectivity, but mediated. Assuming the non-ego as opposite to the ego is in fact, at the beginning, an abstract and therefore immediate positing of thought that does not see itself in the objects of the world, a positing without mediation. Conversely, the transcendental (self-conscious) Ego is a mediated consciousness of itself, because it cannot subsist without consciousness of the other than itself, that is, of the world.

Gentile rejects as abstract the Kantian table of the twelve categories, which depend in fact on the only true concrete judgment constituted by the I think (or aperception):

Since the true judgment, in its concrete character, is not, for example, that "Caesar has subdued Gaul" but: "I think" that Caesar has subdued Gaul": and it is only in this second judgment, which is the only one that can be pronounced, that we can look for the modality of the function of judgment and the true relation that intervenes between the terms that this function unites in an "a priori" synthesis.

— Giovanni Gentile, Teoria generale dello spirito, chap. VIII, § 2

=== Empirical self and transcendental self ===
The transcendental self that operates this synthesis must be distinguished from the empirical self: the latter is an entity different from all the rest as well as from the other empirical selves, the transcendental self is on the contrary the universal subject, which can never be looked at from the outside, because it cannot be the object of our experience, like a show we attend as spectators, otherwise it will no longer be a subject but an object, a self indeed simply empirical.

Thus, that we look at the visible object, or that we look at the eyes to which it is visible, we have two objects of experience: of an experience, the one that we make currently, and with regard to which not only the object, but also the subject of the experience that is analyzed, that is made the term of the new present experience, are object. Except that our eyes, we can only look at them in the mirror!

— Giovanni Gentile, Teoria generale dello spirito, chap. I, § 5

Even if we presume to objectify the subjective act of the Ego, we would still lower it to one of the many finite objects of knowledge. For this reason it is an act that can never be transcended: its transcendental (not transcendent) nature cannot be understood as a completed act, but only as an "act in progress", that is, an act that is never definitively concluded, constantly actualizing and in continuous becoming.

In this act lies that concrete character that remains for Gentile as a fundamental need also in the act of Education, understood as self-education of the mind based not on the otherness of the teacher and the pupil, but on the unity of the same process that are the school and the life, the Pedagogy and the Philosophy, theory and practice.

=== The autoctisis of the mind ===
Actual thought is in fact "the center in which the principle of life is, from which every reality sprouts": actualism is the awareness of this center.

Thinking is at the same time an act, a constant process of self-creation or, as Gentile says, of autoctisis, with which by thinking it places itself and the world at the same time, thus becoming aware of itself .

The self-production of the mind as causa sui ipsius, however, is not prior to the act with which thought is thought, but is this same act, because one cannot formulate thoughts without the awareness of formulating. Moreover, the nature of such a self-production is essentially the volition, free creation of the feeling, whose ethics is not external but is one with this self-production, which alienates itself in an external reality to return to itself.

The moment of objectification, of the non-ego, is essential as it constitutes the very thought of the ego; the latter gives himself an object in order to carry out his activity, because otherwise a thought without content could not exist.

=== The circle of self-awareness: negation and affirmation ===
The starting point of the circle of self-consciousness is therefore an inactual potentiality, but it does not exist only ideally, because without immediacy mediation is not possible.

For the concrete character of thought, which is the negation of the immediacy of any abstract position, to be realized, it is necessary that the abstract character be not only denied but also asserted; in the same way that in order to maintain the fire that destroys the fuel, there must always be fuel, and that this fuel is not removed from the devouring flames, but actually burns.

— Giovanni Gentile, Teoria generale dello spirito, chap. VII, § 9

That is, the abstract is still a moment of the concrete, and it provides fuel for it to the extent that it is denied. The abstract cannot be combusted once and for all, otherwise becoming, or the dialectic of thinking, would stop. Rather, each time the abstract is overcome in the concrete, the concrete presents itself again as a new abstract, to be overcome endlessly.

=== Logic of abstract thought ===
The logic of the concrete therefore does not deny the object, but rather is aware of its abstractness, which it therefore recognizes by admitting alongside the dialectic of thought a logic of the abstract, as its degree or moment in becoming.

The logic of abstract thinking consists of the principle of identity, when being is made the object of thought, becoming identical with itself (A=A).

Being is the negation of thought, because it is external to the actuality of thought, a being that according to Eleatic or naturalistic philosophy would exist even when it is not thought.

Gentile points out that pure (natural) being, understood as the immediate and static "A", cannot be identical to itself, being unthought and therefore unreal, whereas only thought, however abstract, can establish the relation of identity A = A. This relation thinks the being as distinct from the thought, but not separated.

The principle of identity then gives rise to the other determinations of Aristotelian logic such as that of the noncontradiction, of the excluded thirds, of the judgments and of the syllogism, a logic which thus remains fully valued by Gentile, and "remains all solid and alive" as a moment of the logic of the concrete.

=== Logic of concreteness ===
The determinateness of the abstract concept must thus be brought back to the concreteness of the actual life of the spirit, since it is proper for spiritual concreteness to create determined and circumscribed forms.

Even the [...] truth of the equivalence of the internal angles of a triangle to two right angles is something closed and separated only by abstraction; in reality, it is articulated in the process of geometry through all the minds, in which this geometry, in the world, is realized.

— Giovanni Gentile, Teoria generale dello spirito, chap. III, § 8

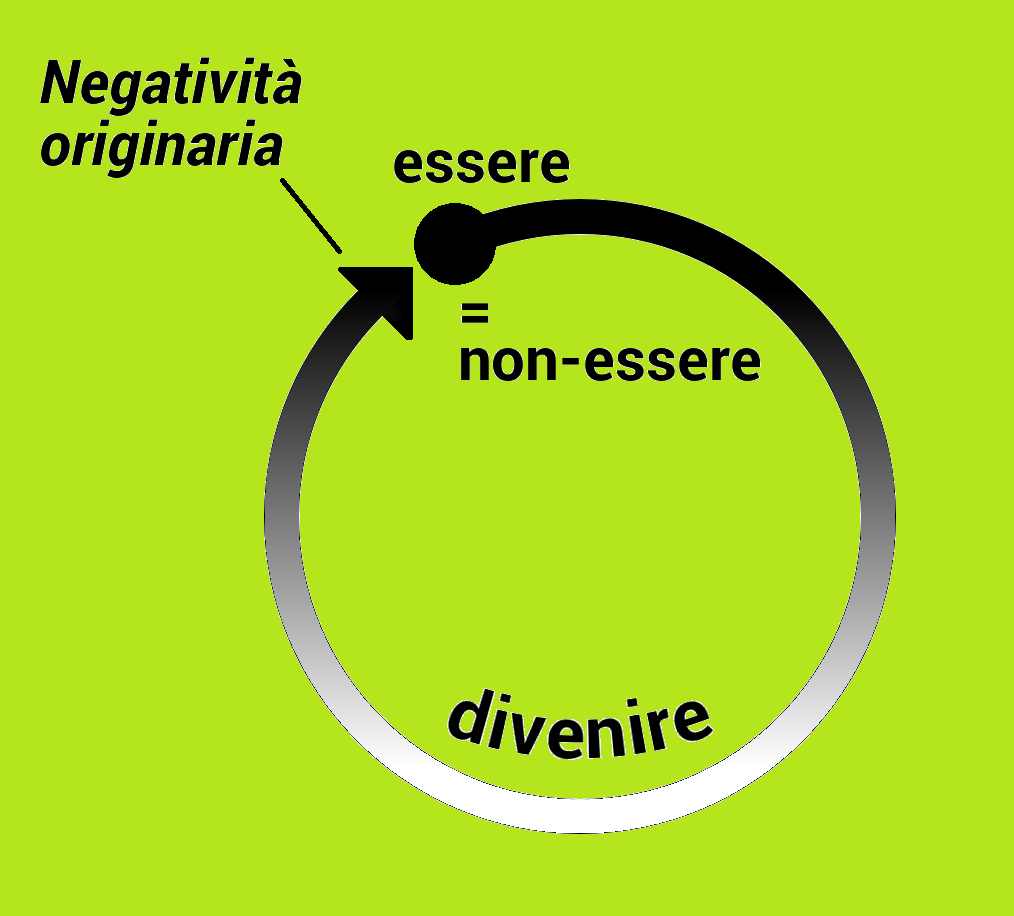
The original negation of being, understood as a presupposition external to thought and therefore recognized as non-being, implies that the becoming of the act, arising from that negation, produces by itself, within itself, the being that it denies by thinking it, resolving itself in a circle.

The determined forms of thought reality, that is, of "experience," are expressions of the historical, spatiotemporal becoming of the Spirit: their multiplicity is not next to the unity of the Spirit, but belongs to the world as the object of consciousness, which unifies them all in a simple act.

The positivity of the historical determinations is thus reconciled with the original negativity of the self-concept, or self-consciousness of the determined concept. The act of the spirit is "original negativity" in that it is fulfilled at the moment in which it denies being as nature (the simple "A" devoid of connections), that is, it denies something that does not exist (mistakenly believed to exist by naturalism), and in this denial it realizes itself. Pure being is nothing because it is not even that conceptual being posited by abstract thought which, although inactual, provides fuel for the logic of the concrete.

The latter, also called authentic or speculative logic, highlights the continuity of the self through its progressive development in the principles me = me (differentiation in unity) but also me = non-me (unity in difference), for both find their synthesis in the real unity of the concrete and the abstract, of the subject thinking and the object thought.

=== Identity of history and current events ===
The transcendental feature of thought is such that the present thought of now includes the past and the future: the now, the present hour of thought is not between before and after, but encompasses the totality of time, and therefore it is eternal, an eternal becoming.

Gentile challenges Croce's distinction between "history that is made" and "history that is thought," between "res gestae" and "historia rerum gestarum," asserting the contemporaneity of history, which "should not be confused with Vico's, which leaves out of itself one that unfolds in time : one where our eternal is the same time considered in the actuality of the spirit".

Historical knowledge consists of the reduction of the multiple to the concrete unity of the act, a synthesis of the opposing theses that conceive the spirit now as a historical dialectic, now as an ahistorical eternity. The identity of philosophy and history is therefore supported by Gentile in a much more radical way than Croce:

The facts of philosophy in its past, think about it; and they can only be the act, the only act of your philosophy, which is not in the past, nor in a present that will be past, because it is the life, the very reality of your thought, the center of irradiation of all times, whether past or future. History, therefore, that which is precisely in time, only materializes in the act of those who consider it as eternal history.

— Giovanni Gentile, Teoria generale dello spirito, chap. XIII, § 13

=== Evolution of the Spirit ===
The history of the spirit as an eternal presence of itself to itself is seen by Gentile as a progressive awareness of actualism.

Reforming the idealism of Hegel, he intends to purge it of both the developments going in the direction of Platonism attempted by the Hegelian Right and the Materialist results of the Hegelian Left. According to Gentile, Plato's mistake is to assume the transcendence of ideas with respect to thought, remaining in a dualism of mind-matter based abstractly on a being, or a matter, presupposed to the thought, which is the characteristic feature of Greek philosophy.

Christian philosophy has the merit of overcoming the intellectual position of the Greeks, their materialistic representation of the world, through the arduous effort to spiritualize reality, while still affirming the transcendence of the Spirit. This will later be resolved by Spinoza in the immanent unity of substance, which Gentile intends to transform into an immanentism of a subjectivistic and spiritualistic kind.

The cogito ergo sum of Descartes is a fundamental step in the journey of Western philosophy toward the self-consciousness of the actualist principle, as are George Berkeley's famous adage esse est percipi and Kant's a priori synthesis, though they still admit some realist and transcendent elements beyond the act of thinking. Berkeley, for example, while affirming the dependence of actual on the idea, i.e., that there are no objects outside our perceptions, nevertheless continues to attribute representations of reality to an objective and absolute mind, presupposed to the human mind. For Gentile, on the contrary, the only absolute thought is that which is immanent to becoming and to individual minds, i.e., actual thought.

With German idealism, thought finally becomes aware that there are no other realities outside itself, although Fichte remains in the dualism of the self and the not-self, which is never overcome by the actuality of thought, but only by an infinitely dilated practical act, without prejudice to the opposition between theory and practice. The same opposition is not overcome by Schelling either, if not by an intellectual intuition thought in a dogmatic way and thus always presupposed to the present consciousness.

Finally, Hegel, by tripling the single thought, conceives of logic and nature as something other than spirit, as "thought" rather than as moments of the same thinking act, so that his dialectic result is definitive, immutable, situated at the apex of the development of the mind. For Gentile, becoming is eternal, outside of time; otherwise arriving at such immutability would be at odds with its flow. To this end, Gentile endorses the need, already stated by Spaventa, to "kantianize" Hegel, by bringing the totality of the mind within the unity of the transcendental self.

In the concrete synthesis of this Ego, in its autoctisis outside of which there is nothing, that distinction between theory and praxis falls away, which Gentile reproached Croce for again, who was wrong to put a "logic of fact" in place of the actual logic of the Spirit, basing it on the distinction of the forms of the Spirit (art, philosophy, economics and ethics), which being "distinct" are only empty abstractions, divorced from the spiritual life, whose unity they compromise.

=== Art, religion and philosophy ===
Gentile repeatedly reiterates the concreteness of the spiritual life of the thinking act, which unfolds in the dialectical triad thesis-antithesis-synthesis, represented by art, religion and philosophy.

- Art (thesis): we have seen how the initial moment of the Spirit's self-production was immediacy, immediate subjectivity, in which art properly consists, which is precisely "the form of subjectivity or, as we also say, of the spirit's immediate individuality".

Gentile recovers the romantic conception of art as pure sentiment, giving it a character of lyrical intuition as De Sanctis and Croce have already done, however, challenging the latter that art is not mediated expression of feeling, but the feeling itself, an active force of the spirit that contains the whole in power. Moreover, art is not to be distinguished from other forms of human creativity as Croce believes, but permeates them all. And sentiment, as the core of art, will be increasingly revalued by Gentile to the point of saying that it is not only the potentiality of thought in action, but infinite creative energy that moves thought itself, and therefore the world, reality.

Thought, yes, is reality, the world. But the Atlas that sustains this world in which we live, and in which living is a joy, is the feeling, which [...] always makes us go back into ourselves to make sure that the world rests firmly on its foundations

— Giovanni Gentile, Filosofia dell'arte, Florence, Sansoni, 1937, p. 373

- Religion (antithesis): opposite to art, religion is the exaltation of the object, disconnected from the subject and therefore from the ideality and knowability of the spirit. As art was consciousness of the subject, religion is therefore consciousness of the object, but without rational mediation, and therefore requires a mystical adherence by the subject who feels like nothing, replacing revelation and grace with knowledge and autonomous will.

Religion, however, is a necessary moment in the development of the spirit that needs to alienate itself in order to become self-aware.

On the other hand, it is not possible either for the spirit to fix itself in its simple religious position, cancelling itself as the subject itself; for the same cancellation can only take place, as we have already observed, by an affirmation of the spirit's activity. The spirit is led by its very nature to overcome each religious position in turn, recovering its autonomy, criticizing its conception of the divine, and thus proceeding to ever more spiritual forms of religion.

— Giovanni Gentile, Teoria generale dello spirito, chap. XIV, § 8

- Philosophy (synthesis): the moment of synthesis is thus represented by philosophy, in whose actuality the contradiction of art and religion, thought at the beginning as inactual, is resolved: these are simultaneously integrated in philosophy, which grasps them not as separate moments, but in the oneness of the final self-conscious act.

Gentile recognizes in Christianity the beginning of this process of evolution of the spirit, because it has always privileged the intimacy and the responsibility of the subject starting from the central dogma of the Man-God, which recomposes in unity the separation between the divine spirit and the human spirit.

=== Actualism and Christianity ===
Gentile thus presents his philosophy as essentially Christian, or the fulfillment of Christianity in a demythologized form, as a religion of interiority which he intends to purge of the elements of realism and transcendence brought historically by platonism and aristotelianism.

Restoring the authentic Christian tradition, Gentile proposes to renew even the spiritualistic instances of the Italian Risorgimento, removing them from Platonism and mysticism of transcendence, in favor of an immanent religiosity that excludes any barrier between sacred and profane, and in which every man finds within himself, and in every aspect of his life, the concrete unity of the spirit.

He who trembles and is afraid to accept in his soul that consciousness of infinite responsibility with which man weighs himself down by recognizing and feeling God in him, is not a Christian, and, if Christianity is only a revelation, that is to say, a more open consciousness that man acquires of his own spiritual nature, he is not even a man. I mean a man conscious of his humanity. [...] And how will he be able to feel free, and therefore able to recognize and fulfill a duty, and to learn a truth, and to enter, in short, into the realm of the spirit, if in the depths of his own being he does not feel the gathering and the pulsation of history, of the universe, of the infinite, of everything? [...] And therefore the actualist does not deny God, but with the mystics and the most religious spirits that have been in the world, repeats: "Est Deus in nobis".

— Giovanni Gentile, Introduzione alla filosofia [1933], Florence, Le Lettere, 1958, p. 33

=== Actualism and science ===
Between art and religion lies science, which shares the limits of both without participating in their validity. Like art, science does not deal with the universal but with the particular and, in this sense, it is subjective. On the other hand, being faced with an object that it does not create, whose materiality is opposed to the activity of the spirit, science is in a condition of passivity typical of religion.

[...] It [science] is therefore agnostic by nature, and ready to say not only ignoramus, but also, and above all, ignorabimus, as religion does in front of its unknown and formidable God in its mystery. Ignoring the true impenetrable being of things, science knows what it considers to be a pure phenomenon, a subjective, one-sided and fragmentary appearance, like the image of the poet who sends a flash of lightning to the imagination in a dream from which the mind is distant from reality. The science, therefore, oscillating between art and religion, does not unify them, as the philosophy, in a superior synthesis; on the contrary, it adds, with the defect of objectivity and universality of the art, the defect of subjectivity and rationality of the religion.

— Giovanni Gentile, Teoria generale dello spirito, chap. XV, § 8

Instead of combining the subjectivity of art with the objectivity of religion, as philosophy does, science thus remains at their level of abstraction, which cannot be overcome except in the self-consciousness of the spiritual act, the only one where subject and object concretely coexist.

Gentile rejects the accusation of "hostility to science". To the contrary, he claims to share the desire, proper to a scientific mind, to overcome every limit that is considered inviolable by thought, a desire that finds its foundation in the "fruitfulness" of a philosophy such as the actualist one.

Because actualism denies the existence of immutable realities that oppose thought, every limit to free human creativity falls in the technico-scientific direction.

=== Ethics and politics ===
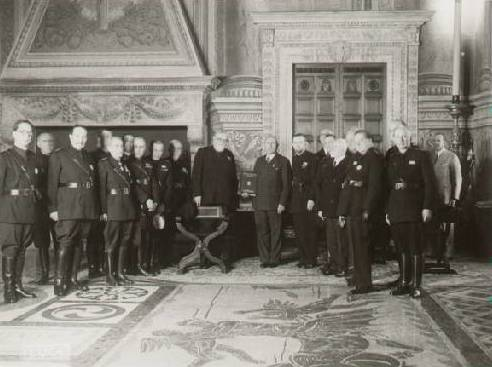
Giovanni Gentile with Benito Mussolini at the seat of the fascist government in the Palace of Venice (1937)

Since the divine is immanent to the human, even on the ethical level, the spirit must be affirmed not as an empty universality that suppresses individuality, but as the concrete overcoming of particular interests in a superior ethics that includes them all and at the same time realizes them.

In this sense, Gentile presents himself as "more liberal than Wilson and more socialist than Lenin" ("più liberale di Wilson e più socialista di Lenin, certamente"), defending a human liberty understood as the capacity to universalize oneself by going beyond the limits of one's own empirical singularity. Gentile rejects the distinction made by Croce between economics and ethics, which, taken individually, remain at the stage of unattainable abstractions, in order to integrate them into a synthesis in which both find their concreteness in action, represented by State Ethics. The State is conceived by Gentile as a living organism in which individuals express themselves and discover their raison d'être; a state that does not set itself as a fixed and binding goal, but understood dynamically as a constant process of integration and renewal of spiritual life, as Gentile saw embodied by fascism.

In view of a reform of ethics and of the national conscience of which Actualism would have constituted the foundations, he motivated his adherence to Fascism by honouring himself as its official philosopher.

== Reception ==
Actual idealism was successful in that it promoted a theory of regarding thought, that garnered enough attention to be a competitor to the new waves of positivism, and therefore materialist conceptions of social life that were vying for reformist tendencies in the politics of the time. Its ideas were key to helping the National Fascist Party consolidate power in Italy with its own reform, and integral to giving fascism the content of its philosophical sentiment. Despite this, Gentile claimed actual idealism to be the true form of positivism, and the proper interpretation of the concept of positivism.

== Criticism ==
Benedetto Croce objected that Gentile's "pure act" is nothing other than Schopenhauer's will. However Schopenhauer "…came to rest in an Absolute which transcends concrete experience … and for (Schopenhauer) the Critical Philosophy was only a prolegomena or propaedeutic to a speculative or 'transcendent' philosophy of the kind which Gentile and Kant are united in opposing", according to H. S. Harris's book on the basic metaphysics of Giovanni Gentile in contrast to that of Schopenhauer.

With actualism, Gentile reforms Hegelian dialectic based on the spiritualist motives of the Italian ontological tradition, reconciling them with the needs of concrete character of Marxist thought. He thus takes to Spaventa and Marx the reference models to reinterpret Hegel, proceeding to one of his "kantianizations", but avoiding falling into materialism.

An opponent of all intellectualism, which he considered detached from reality, he succeeded in postulating a theory of speculative thought that would obtain sufficient consensus to compete with the new waves of positivism (and thus of materialist conceptions of social life) that were clashing in the field of reformist political trends of the time. In 1921, Piero Gobetti wrote of Gentile that he "brought philosophy down from the professorial obscurities into the concreteness of life". However, unlike Benedetto Croce, who permeates Italian culture in general, Gentile had an impact on the specifically philosophical milieu of his time.

His ideas, historically, are decisive for the consolidation of power of the National Fascist Party in Italy, providing a dogmatic basis for relative reforms, as well as the real driving force of the Fascist philosophical doctrine, tending towards the construction of a new humanity. Nevertheless, Gentile claims for his actualism the quintessential quality of positivism, of which it would constitute only the most correct interpretation.

With his conception idealist, Gentile intends to become a prophet of the spirit, a priest of an immanent divinity that religion wrongly considers transcendent, devoid of limits and imperfections. This concept, however, enters a crisis at the end of World War II, when new philosophical paradigms based on existentialism and individualistic presuppositions impose themselves. Nicola Abbagnano, although a bearer of these new philosophical instances, exalted Gentile's differences between Gentile's philosophy and the idealism of Benedetto Croce, emphasizing at the same time the strongly romanticism roots from which Gentile's actualism draws.

Gentile's position [...] seemed to me, because it was, clearer and more concrete than Croce's. Moreover, although linked to Hegelianism, in all his philosophical system Gentile tried to free himself from abstraction and to anchor himself in reality. Also because of the strong political value of his personality, he criticized Hegel: he was indeed wrong, according to him, to have attempted a dialectic (relation/conflict between "thesis" and "antithesis", in order to generate an infinite series of rational "syntheses", aiming at Progress) relative to the thought, i.e., to the Spirit or to the thinkable reality, whereas the only dialectic is the one that involves the thinking, i.e., the human subject in the act in which he thinks. This "actualism" (the only reality is the thought in act, that is the subject of the thought) had in itself a flavor of concrete character, much more convincing than the schemes of Croce. Gentile also partially distanced himself from Hegel by affirming, in practice, that nothing exists outside the act of thought.

— Nicola Abbagnano, Nella Napoli nobilissima, in Ricordi di un filosopho, sous la direction de Marcello Staglieno, § 3, p. 33, Milan, Rizzoli, 1990

Similarly, according to Leo Valiani, "his philosophy seems anachronistic to us. The evolution of societies and sciences has made it even more anachronistic than it already was. The link between thinking and doing, the problem of the active character of knowledge, which is at the center of Gentile's meditations, is nevertheless an eternal problem, which survives the particular approach he gave it".

Among Gentile's most faithful disciples is Ugo Spirito, who defends the immanentism of his philosophy, to the point of reconciling it, after a long philosophical journey, with a vision that elevates science to the rank of cornerstone of the contemporary age. If other thinkers find in Marxism a natural outlet for his immanentism, there are those who, more attentive to the religious and spiritualist motives of his thought, claim the need to open up to transcendence, in particular the idealist Augusto Guzzo, or in the Catholic sphere, Armando Carlini, Michele Federico Sciacca and Augusto del Noce.

Recently, the philosopher Emanuele Severino is keen to highlight "the essential solidarity between actualism and techno-science; on the other hand, the capacity of actualism to carry over the entire Western tradition: this means that Gentile's thought is destined to be recognized as one of the most decisive features of world culture".

== See also ==
- Absolute idealism
- Constructivist epistemology
- Dialectical monism
- Idealism
- Phenomenology
- Plane of immanence
- Platonic epistemology
- Process philosophy
- Transcendental idealism
