= Augusto Vera =

Italian philosopher

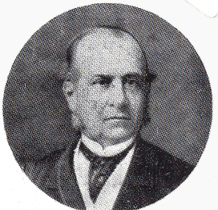
Augusto Vera

Augusto Vera (4 May 1813 – 13 July 1885) was an Italian philosopher who followed Hegel's theories and translated many of his works.

== Life ==
Vera was born in Amelia in the province of Terni. He was educated in Rome and Paris, and, after teaching classics for some years in Geneva, held chairs of philosophy in various colleges in France. He was a philosophy teacher at the Lycée Victor-Duruy (Mont-de-Marsan) and subsequently was professor in Strasbourg and in Paris. He left Paris after the coup d'etat of 1851 and spent nine years in England. Attaching himself with enthusiasm to Hegel's system, Vera (who wrote fluently both in French and in English as well as in Italian) became widely influential in spreading a knowledge of the Hegelian doctrine, and became the chief representative of Italian Hegelianism.

Without any marked originality, his writings are distinguished by lucidity of exposition and genuine philosophic spirit. In 1860 Vera returned to Italy, where he was made professor of philosophy in the Royal Academy of Milan. In the following year, at the invitation of Francesco de Sanctis, he was transferred to Naples as professor of philosophy at the University of Naples. His Prolusioni alla Storia della Filosofia and Lezioni sulla Filosofia della Storia were connected with his professorial work, which was specially devoted to the history of philosophy and the philosophy of history. He kept his teaching position until his death in Naples.

== Philosophy ==
It was during his studies, with Victor Cousin in Paris, that he came to know about philosophy and through them he acquired knowledge of Hegelianism and it culminated during the events of the 1848-49 French revolution. In England he continued his studies of Hegelian philosophy. During his years in Naples, he would maintain relationships with the Philosophical Society of Berlin, which originally consisted of Hegelians, and kept up to date with both the German and the French Hegelian literature. As a teacher, he undertook the translation of Hegel's Introduzione alla filosofia (Introduction to philosophy) in French. A lot of his work on neo-Hegelian theories were undertaken with Bertrando Spaventa. Some works see the Italian Hegelian doctrine as having led to Italian Fascism.

== Works ==
Among his works may be mentioned:

- Introduction à la philosophie d'Hégel (1855; 2nd ed., 1865)
- Problème de la certitude (1845)
- Le Hégelianisme et la philosophie (1861)
- Mélanges philosophiques (1862)
- Essais de philosophie Hégélienne (1864)
- Strauss, l'ancienne et la nouvelle foi (1873), an attack upon Strauss's last "confession," written from the standpoint of an orthodox Hegelian
- A comprehensive work in Italian, Il Problema dell' Assoluto (Naples, 1872–82).

His English works are:

- Inquiry into Speculative and Experimental Science (London, 1856)
- Introduction to Speculative Logic and Philosophy (St Louis, 1875)
- A translation of Bretschneider's History of Religion and of the Christian Church.

He also published translations into French with commentaries of Hegel's works:

- Logique de Hégel (Paris, 1859; 2nd ed., 1874)
- Philosophie de la nature de Hégel (1863–65)
- Philosophie de l'esprit de Hégel (1867–69)
- Philosophie de la religion de Hégel (1876–78, incomplete).
