= Absolute idealism =

Type of idealism in metaphysics

Absolute idealism is a form of idealism chiefly associated with F. W. J. Schelling and G. W. F. Hegel, both of whom were German idealist philosophers in the 19th century. The label has also been attached to others such as Josiah Royce, an American philosopher who was greatly influenced by Hegel's work, the British idealists (often referred to as the neo-Hegelians), and the Italian idealists, particularly the actual idealism of Giovanni Gentile.

According to Hegel, being is ultimately comprehensible only as an all-inclusive whole (das Absolute). Hegel asserted that in order for the thinking subject (human reason or consciousness) to be able to know its object (the world) at all, there must be in some sense an identity of thought and being. Otherwise, the subject would never have access to the object and we would have no certainty about any of our knowledge of the world.

The absolute idealist position dominated philosophy in nineteenth-century Britain and Germany, while exerting significantly less influence in the United States. The absolute idealist position should be distinguished from the subjective idealism of Berkeley, the transcendental idealism of Immanuel Kant, or the post-Kantian critical idealism (or post-Kantian transcendental idealism) of J. G. Fichte.

== Schelling and Hegel's concepts of the absolute ==
According to the scholar Andrew Bowie, Hegel's system depends upon showing how each view and positing of the world has an internal contradiction: "This necessarily leads thought to more comprehensive ways of grasping the world, until the point where there can be no more comprehensive way because there is no longer any contradiction to give rise to it."

For Hegel, the interaction of opposites generates, in a dialectical fashion, all concepts necessary to comprehend what is.

For Kant, reason was only for us, and the categories only emerged within the subject. However, for Hegel, reason is fully immanent. Spirit emerges from nature in history and, in art, religion, and philosophy, knows itself in its truth.

Hegel shows that the world is not other than self. With the realization that mind and world are, by logical necessity, meaningfully coherent, our access to the world is made secure, a security that was lost in Kant's proclamation that the thing-in-itself was ultimately inaccessible.

Hegel's position is a critical transformation of the concept of the absolute advanced by Friedrich Wilhelm Joseph von Schelling (1775–1854), who argued for a philosophy of Identity; as articulated by Bowie:

‘Absolute identity’ is, then, the link of the two aspects of being, which, on the one hand, is the universe, and, on the other, is the changing multiplicity which the knowable universe also is. Schelling insists now that “The I think, I am, is, since Descartes, the basic mistake of all knowledge; thinking is not my thinking, and being is not my being, for everything is only of God or the totality” (SW I/7, p. 148), so the I is ‘affirmed’ as a predicate of the being by which it is preceded.

For Schelling, the absolute is a causeless 'ground' upon which relativity (difference and similarity) can be discerned by human judgement (and thus permit 'freedom' itself) and this ground must be simultaneously not of the 'particular' world of finites, but also not wholly different from them (or else there would be no commensurability with empirical reality, objects, sense data, etc. to be compared as 'relative' or otherwise).

In both Schelling and Hegel's systems (especially the latter), the project aims towards a completion of metaphysics. As Redding describes it: "While opinions divide as to how Hegel's approach to logic relates to that of Kant, it is important to grasp that for Hegel logic is not simply a science of the form of our thoughts. It is also a science of actual content as well, and as such has an ontological dimension."

For Schelling, reason was an organic 'striving' in nature, and this striving was one in which the subject and the object approached an identity. Schelling saw reason as the link between spirit and the phenomenal world, as Lauer explains: "For Schelling [...] nature is not the negative of reason, to be submitted to it as reason makes the world its home, but has since its inception been turning itself into a home for reason."

Hegel's doubts about intellectual intuition's ability to prove or legitimate that the particular is in identity with whole led him to progressively formulate a speculative dialectic in which concepts like Aufhebung came to be articulated. Beiser summarizes the early formulation as follows:

a) Some finite concept, true of only a limited part of reality, would go beyond its limits in attempting to know all of reality. It would claim to be an adequate concept to describe the absolute because, like the absolute, it has a complete or self-sufficient meaning independent of any other concept.

b) This claim would come into conflict with the fact that the concept depends for its meaning on some other concept, having meaning only in contrast to its negation. There would then be a contradiction between its claim to independence and its de facto dependence upon another concept.

c) The only way to resolve the contradiction would be to reinterpret the claim to independence, so that it applies not just to one concept to the exclusion of the other but to the whole of both concepts. Of course, the same stages could be repeated on a higher level, and so on, until we come to the complete system of all concepts, which is alone adequate to describe the absolute.

Hegel's innovation in German Idealism was to theorize a historical mode of self-consciousness self-reflection capable of generating a more inclusively holistic understanding of what it ultimately means to be rational in the grand scheme of things.

== Absolute idealism in Britain ==
By the beginning of the 19th century, German idealist philosophy, particularly that of Kant, Hegel, and Fichte, was being read by British philosophers. Figures such as Samuel Taylor Coleridge, Thomas Carlyle and J. F. Ferrier found in idealism an alternative and a response to the then-dominant empiricist views in Britain. Early authors such as James Hutchison Stirling not only attempted to introduce German idealist thought to Britain, but sought to present their own version of absolute idealism in an English medium.

Edward Caird and T. H. Green were of the first generation of British idealists who took the work of Hegel and some of his successors and, from their positions as professors at the universities of Glasgow and Oxford, respectively, influenced generations of students. Absolute idealism was more fully developed in a second generation by their students, especially F. H. Bradley and Bernard Bosanquet. Bradley's 1893 Appearance and Reality and Bosanquet's two volumes of Gifford lectures, The Principle of Individuality and Value (1912) and The Value and Destiny of the Individual were the most influential volumes of absolute idealism of the period. British absolute idealism had an influence not only within philosophy, but in theology, politics, and social and public policy. Moreover, many of the students of the idealists, in turn, introduced absolute idealism to Canada, southern Africa, and India.

== Absolute idealism in Italy ==
Neo-idealism in Italy took on different characteristics from its English counterpart. Among its exponents were Guido De Ruggiero, a supporter of social liberalism, and above all Benedetto Croce, who articulated idealism in a historicist sense, and Giovanni Gentile, who theorized an actual idealism, which he saw embodied in the fascist state.

Gentile made a pivotal distinction to factors concerning Idealism's own criteria for reality, which have stood since Berkeley's adage «esse est percipi» by distinguishing between the concrete real «act of thinking», and the abstract «static thought». For him, only in "thinking in action" is dialectical self-consciousness that includes everything.

So Gentile transfused he whole reality of nature, history and spirit in the pure act of thought. Every thing exists only in the mental act of thinking it: there are no single empirical entities separated from the trascendental consciousness; even the past lives only in the actual, present moment of memory. Idealism itself cannot ignore our current awareness of it:

An idealistic conception aims at conceiving the absolute, the whole, as an idea, and is therefore intrinsically absolute idealism. But absolute it cannot be unless the idea coincides with the act of knowing it, because were the idea not the act itself through which it is known, it would leave something outside itself, and the idealism would then no longer be absolute.

— Giovanni Gentile, The Theory of Mind as Pure Act, chapter XVII (1916)

== Reactions ==
Absolute idealism has greatly altered the philosophical landscape. This influence is mostly felt in the strong opposition it engendered. Both logical positivism and analytic philosophy grew out of a rebellion against Hegelianism prevalent in England during the 19th century. Continental phenomenology, existentialism, and postmodernism also seek to 'free themselves from Hegel's thought'.

Geoffrey Warnock, writing after the demise of absolute idealism as a philosophical movement in Britain, wrote that the absolute idealists were motivated by emotional concerns, which he says Bradley and McTaggart admitted. He also criticized them for vagueness and overreliance on rhetoric as opposed to argument, he added that in the writings of some "solemnity and unclarity seem to rise not seldom to the pitch of actual fraud".

Martin Heidegger, one of the leading figures of Continental philosophy in the 20th century, sought to distance himself from Hegel's work. One of Heidegger's philosophical themes in Being and Time was "overcoming metaphysics," aiming to distinguish his book from Hegelian tracts. After the 1927 publication, Heidegger's "early dismissal of them [German idealists] gives way to ever-mounting respect and critical engagement." He continued to compare and contrast his philosophy with Absolute idealism, principally due to critical comments that certain elements of this school of thought anticipated Heideggerian notions of "overcoming metaphysics."

== See also ==
- Doctrine of internal relations
- Jena Romanticism
- Objective idealism
