= Ontologism =

Unsafe Philosophical System

Ontologism is a philosophical system most associated with Nicholas Malebranche (1638–1715) which maintains that God and divine ideas are the first object of our intelligence and the intuition of God the first act of our intellectual knowledge. Nicolas Malebranche was a source for many later philosophers of Ontologism such as Antonio Rosmini. The Holy Office condemned Ontologism in 1861 as unsafe for teaching (tuto tradi non possunt).

== See also ==
- Antoine Arnauld
- Casimir Ubaghs
- Vincenzo Gioberti
- Antonio Rosmini-Serbati

== Bibliography ==
- Malebranche, Nicholas. Dialogues on Metaphysics and on Religion, trans. David Scott, ed. Nicholas Jolley. Cambridge: Cambridge University Press, 1997.
- Malebranche, Nicholas. The Search After Truth, trans. Paul J. Olscamp, ed. Thomas Lennon. Cambridge: Cambridge University Press, 1997.
- Rosmini, Antonio. The constitution under social justice, trans. Alberto Mingardi. Lexington Books, 2006.
- Rosmini, Antonio. The origin of ideas, trans. Anonymous (Translated from the 5th Italian ed.). London: Keegan Paul, Trench, 1883.
- Rosmini, Antonio. Discourses on Moral & Religious Subjects, trans. Anonymous. James Duffy and Sons, 1882
