= List of Italian philosophers =

This list presents Italian philosophers, classified chronologically, by historical era.

Italian philosophy has a long history dating back to antiquity. While there have been various foreign influences on the philosophy of Italy, this article focuses solely on philosophers native to Italy.

== Ancient philosophers ==
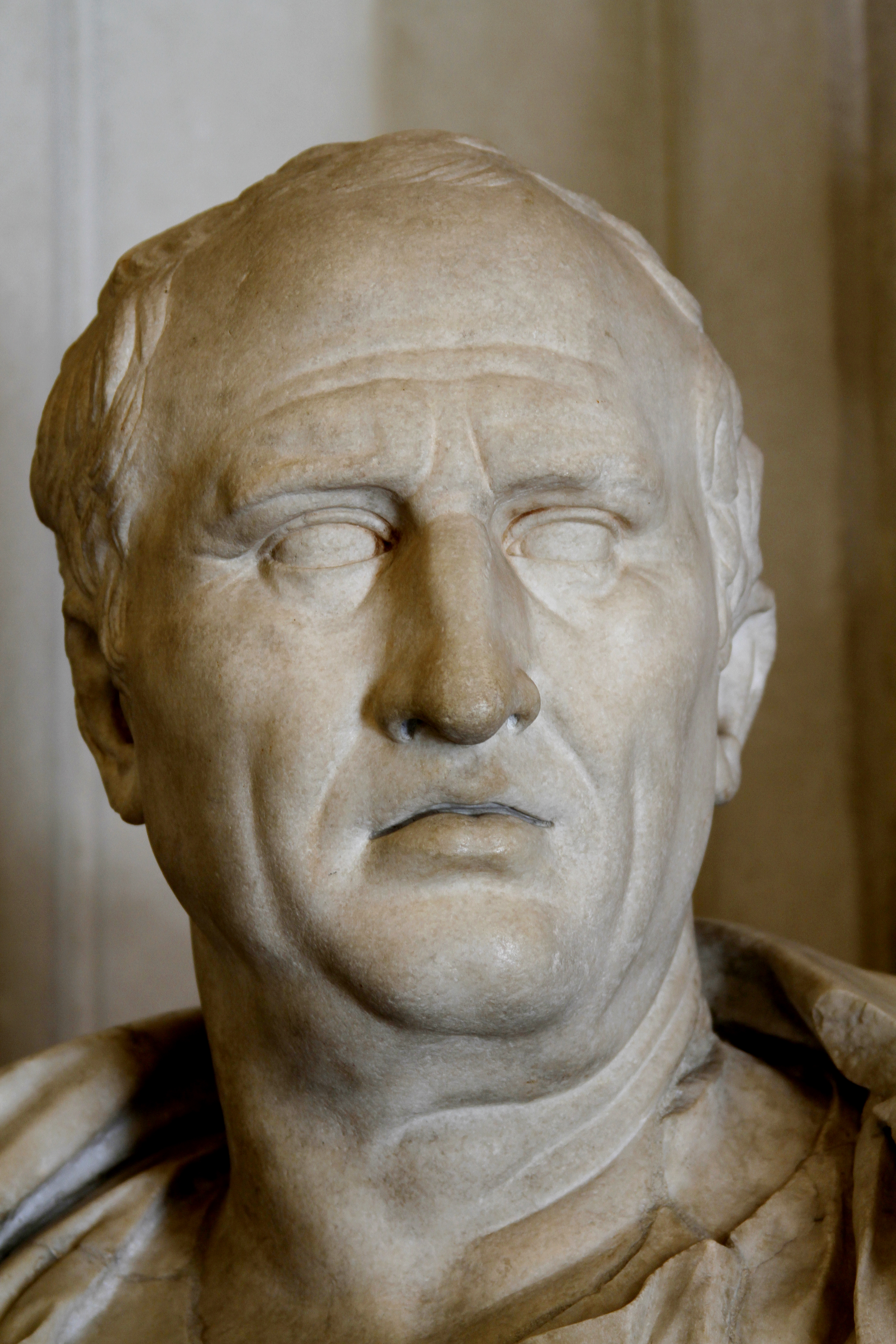
First-century AD bust of Cicero in the Capitoline Museums, Rome

- Catius
- Amafinius
- Gaius Blossius
- Papirius Fabianus
- Aulus Cornelius Celsus
- Cato the Younger
- Cicero
- Helvidius Priscus
- Lucretius
- Marcus Junius Brutus
- Nigidius Figulus
- Seneca the Younger
- Arulenus Rusticus
- Publius Clodius Thrasea Paetus
- Gaius Musonius Rufus
- Tacitus
- Marcus Aurelius
- Marcus Minucius Felix
- Claudius Aelianus
- Amelius
- Calcidius
- Tyrannius Rufinus

== Medieval philosophers ==
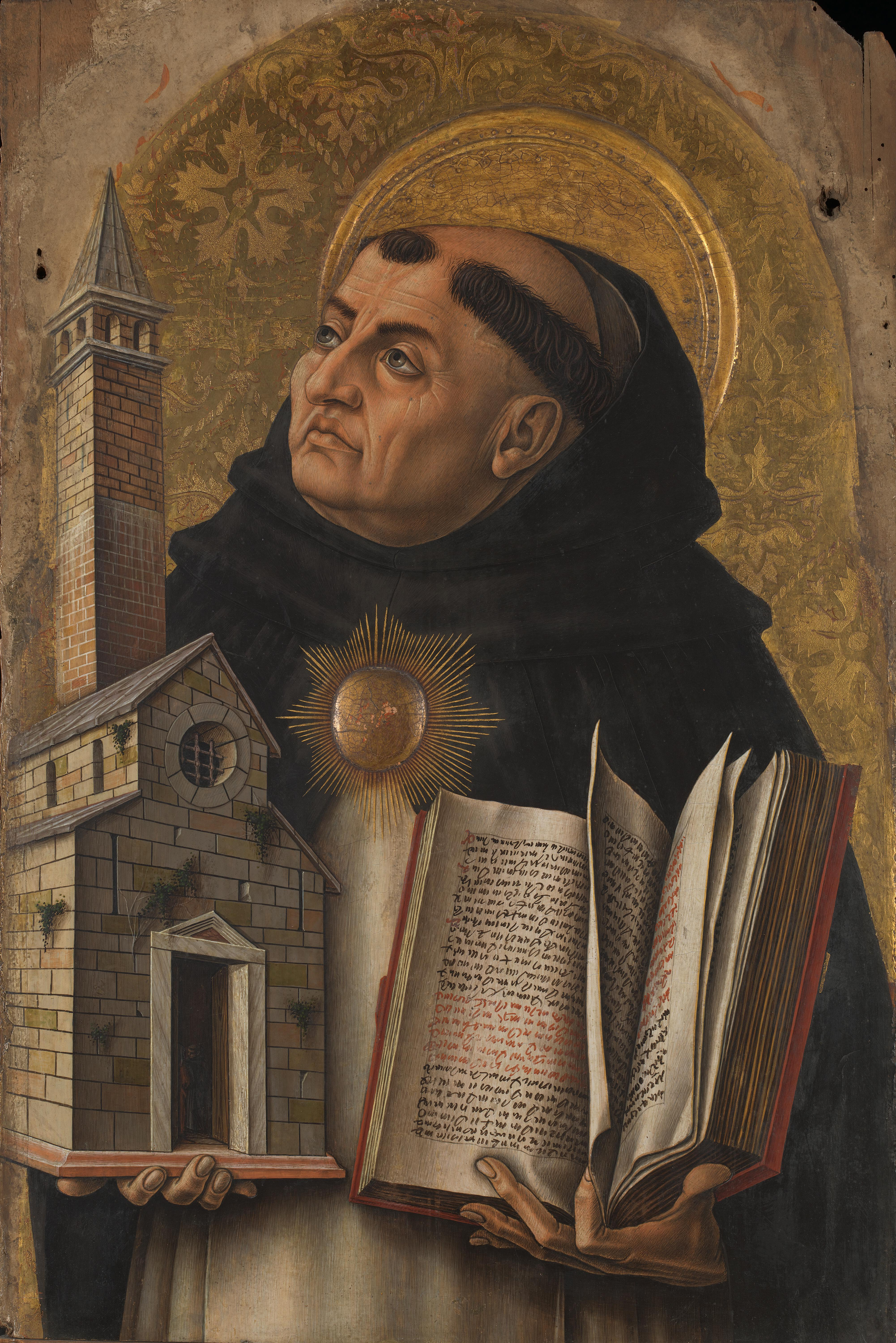
Saint Thomas Aquinas

- Boethius
- Cassiodorus
- Joachim of Fiore
- Anselm of Besate
- Lanfranc
- Pierre Lombard
- Peter of Capua the Elder
- Boncompagno da Signa
- Brunetto Latini
- Bonaventure
- Thomas Aquinas
- Matthew of Aquasparta
- Giles of Rome
- Pietro d'Abano
- Cavalcante Cavalcanti
- John of Naples
- James of Viterbo
- Michael of Cesena
- Marsilio da Padova
- Albertano da Brescia
- Menahem Recanati
- Isaac ben Mordecai
- Hillel ben Samuel
- Eliezer ben Samuel of Verona
- Francis of Marchia
- Gregory of Rimini
- Giovanni Dondi
- Blasius of Parma
- Guarino of Verona
- Paul of Venice
- Leonardo Bruni
- Palla di Onorio Strozzi
- Poggio Bracciolini
- Gaetano da Thiene

== Philosophers born in the 15th century ==
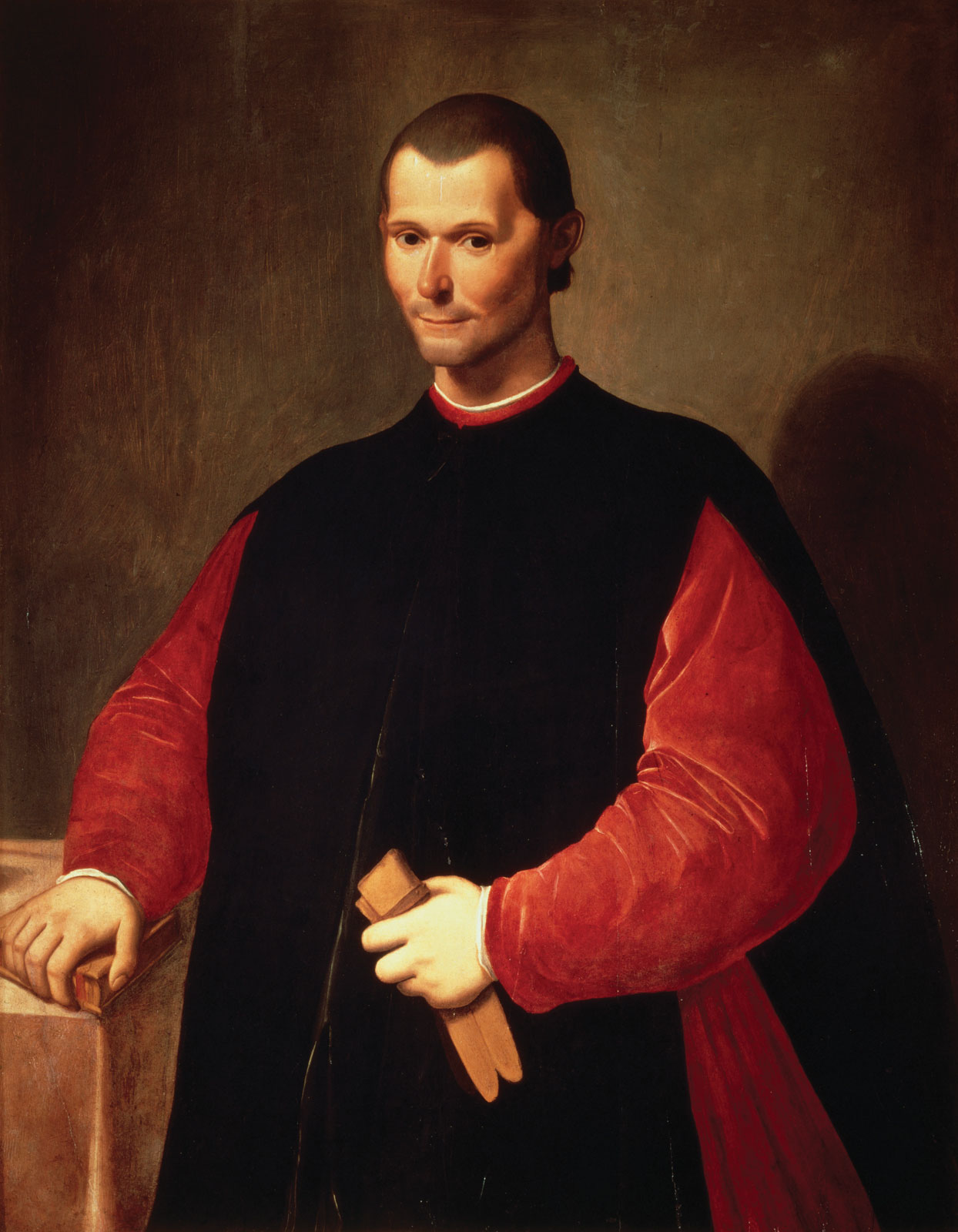
Niccolò Machiavelli

- Leon Battista Alberti
- Lorenzo Valla
- Judah Messer Leon
- Cristoforo Landino
- Marsilio Ficino
- Alessandro Braccesi
- Ludovico Lazzarelli
- Pomponazzi
- Giovanni Pico della Mirandola
- Alessandro Achillini
- Francesco Cattani da Diacceto
- Francesco Zorzi
- Thomas Cajetan
- Niccolò Machiavelli
- Aulo Giano Parrasio
- Petrus Egidius
- Obadiah ben Jacob Sforno
- Marcantonio Zimara
- Agostino Nifo
- Girolamo Fracastoro
- Leandro Alberti
- Giulio Camillo Delminio
- Francesco Guicciardini
- Mariangelo Accorso
- Jacopo Aconcio
- Matteo Tafuri
- Simone Porzio
- Vittore Trincavelli
- Agostino Steuco
- Giovan Battista Gelli
- Mario Nizzoli
- Sperone Speroni
- Pier Angelo Manzolli

== Philosophers born in the 16th century ==
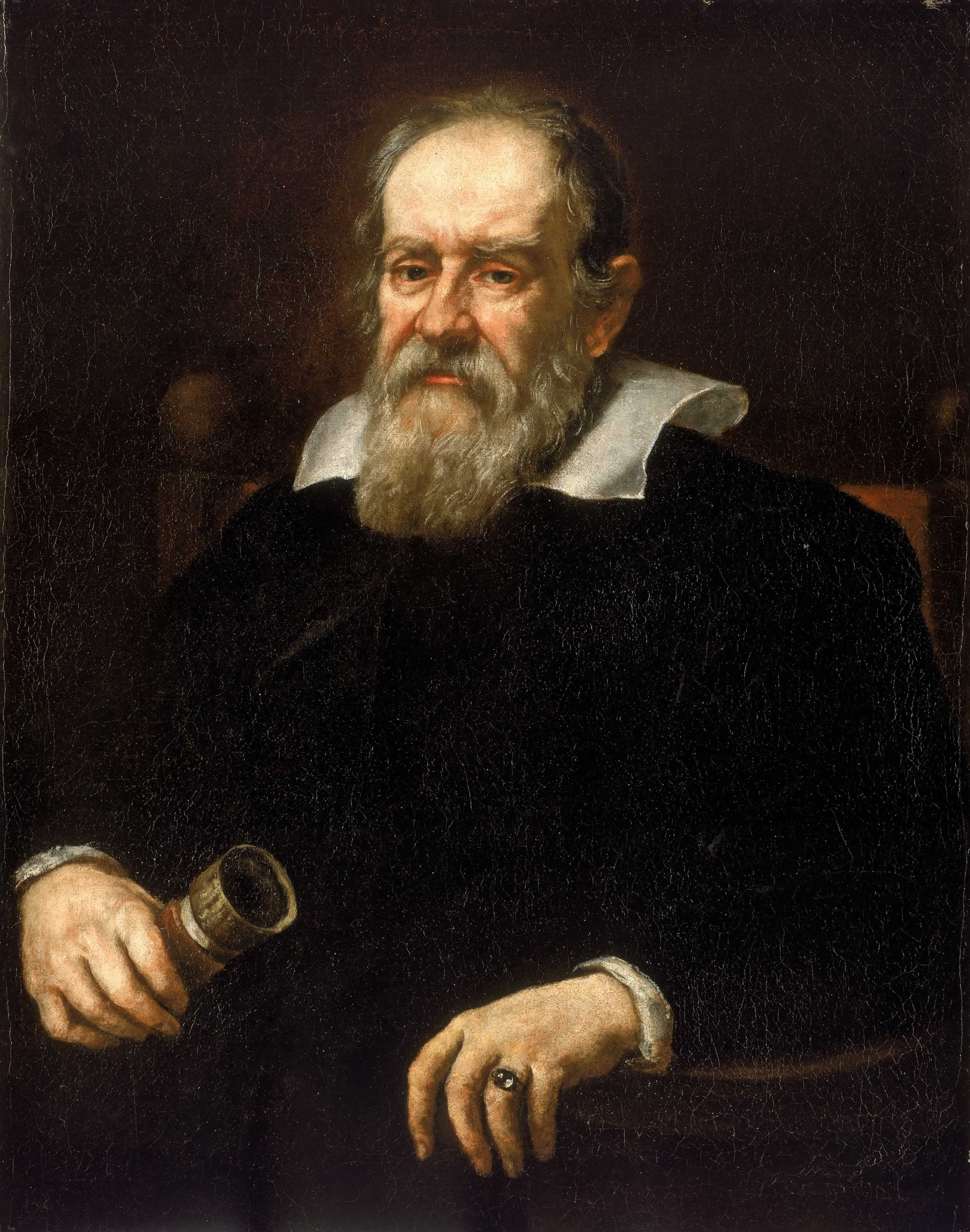
Galileo Galilei

- Girolamo Cardano
- Moshe Provençal
- Leon of Modena
- Alessandro Piccolomini
- Bernardino Telesio
- Azariah dei Rossi
- Guglielmo Gratarolo
- Andrea Cesalpino
- Francesco Piccolomini
- Francesco Patrizi
- Girolamo Mercuriale
- Marcello Capra
- Simone Simoni
- Jacopo Zabarella
- Francesco Buonamici
- Giambattista della Porta
- Francesco Pucci
- Giovanni Botero
- Guidobaldo del Monte
- Giordano Bruno
- Jacopo Mazzoni
- Cesare Cremonini
- Giulio Pace
- Abraham Yagel
- Galileo Galilei
- Lodovico delle Colombe
- Tommaso Campanella
- Antonio Serra
- Fortunio Liceti
- Mario Bettinus
- Lucilio "Giulio Cesare" Vanini
- Valeriano Magni
- Antonio Rocco
- Torquato Accetto
- Francesco Pona
- Giacomo Accarisi
- Giulio Sirenio

== Philosophers born in the 17th century ==
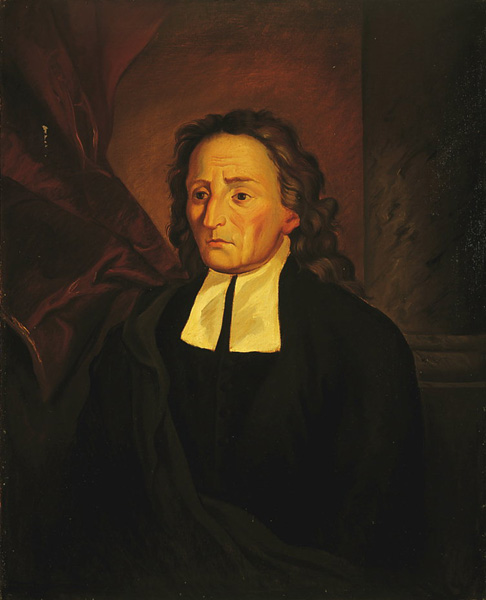
Giambattista Vico

- Bartolomeo Mastri
- Lemme Rossi
- Giovanni Alfonso Borelli
- Tito Livio Burattini
- Francesco D'Andrea
- Elena Cornaro Piscopia
- Michelangelo Fardella
- Giovanni Battista Tolomei
- Domenico Gagliardi
- Francesco Bianchini
- Tommaso Campailla
- Giambattista Vico
- Luigi Guido Grandi
- Pietro Giannone
- Giovanni Andrea Tria
- Antonio Schinella Conti
- Francesco Maria Zanotti
- Alberto Radicati
- Jacopo Stellini
- Giuseppa Eleonora Barbapiccola

== Philosophers born in the 18th century ==
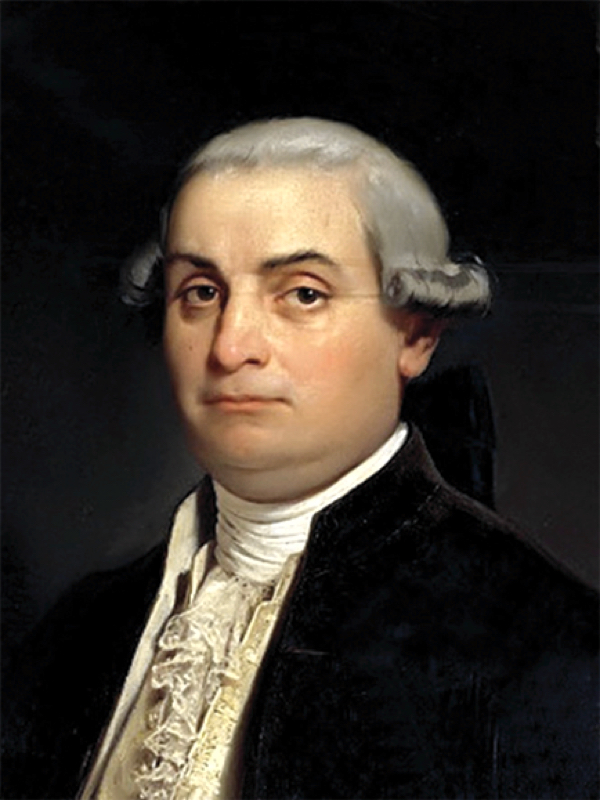
Cesare Beccaria

- Moshe Chaim Luzzatto
- Giovanni Salvemini
- Francesco Algarotti
- Antonio Genovesi
- Giovanni Maria Ortes
- Appiano Buonafede
- Cosimo Alessandro Collini
- Giambattista Toderini
- Pietro Verri
- Filippo Mazzei
- Ferrante de Gemmis
- Cesare Beccaria
- Giovanni Cristofano Amaduzzi
- Nicola Spedalieri
- Alessandro Verri
- Melchiorre Delfico
- Niccola Andria
- Vittorio Alfieri
- Vitangelo Bisceglia
- Gaetano Filangieri
- Joseph de Maistre
- Gian Domenico Romagnosi
- Marco Mastrofini
- Pasquale Galluppi
- Paolo Costa
- Monaldo Leopardi
- Francesco Puccinotti
- Antonio Rosmini
- Giacomo Leopardi
- Terenzio Mamiani della Rovere

== Philosophers born in the 19th century ==
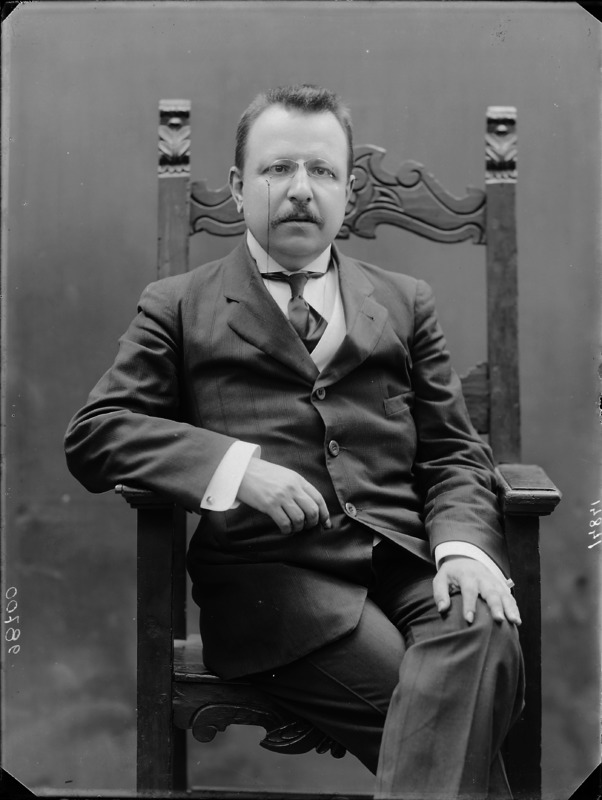
Benedetto Croce

- Carlo Cattaneo
- Vincenzo Gioberti
- Matteo Liberatore
- Giuseppe Ferrari
- Gaetano Sanseverino
- Raffaele Garofalo
- Augusto Vera
- Francesco De Sanctis
- Ausonio Franchi
- Augusto Conti
- Giorgio Politeo
- Luigi Fabbri
- Roberto Ardigò
- Francesco Bonatelli
- Francesco Acri
- Francesco Fiorentino
- Giovanni Bovio
- Antonio Labriola
- Gaetano Mosca
- Vilfredo Pareto
- Giuliano Kremmerz
- Benedetto Croce
- Errico Malatesta
- Enrico Ruta
- Eugenio Rignano
- Giuseppe Rensi
- Giovanni Gentile
- Sergio Panunzio
- Carlo Michelstaedter
- Arturo Reghini
- Antonio Gramsci
- Julius Evola

== Philosophers born in the 20th century ==
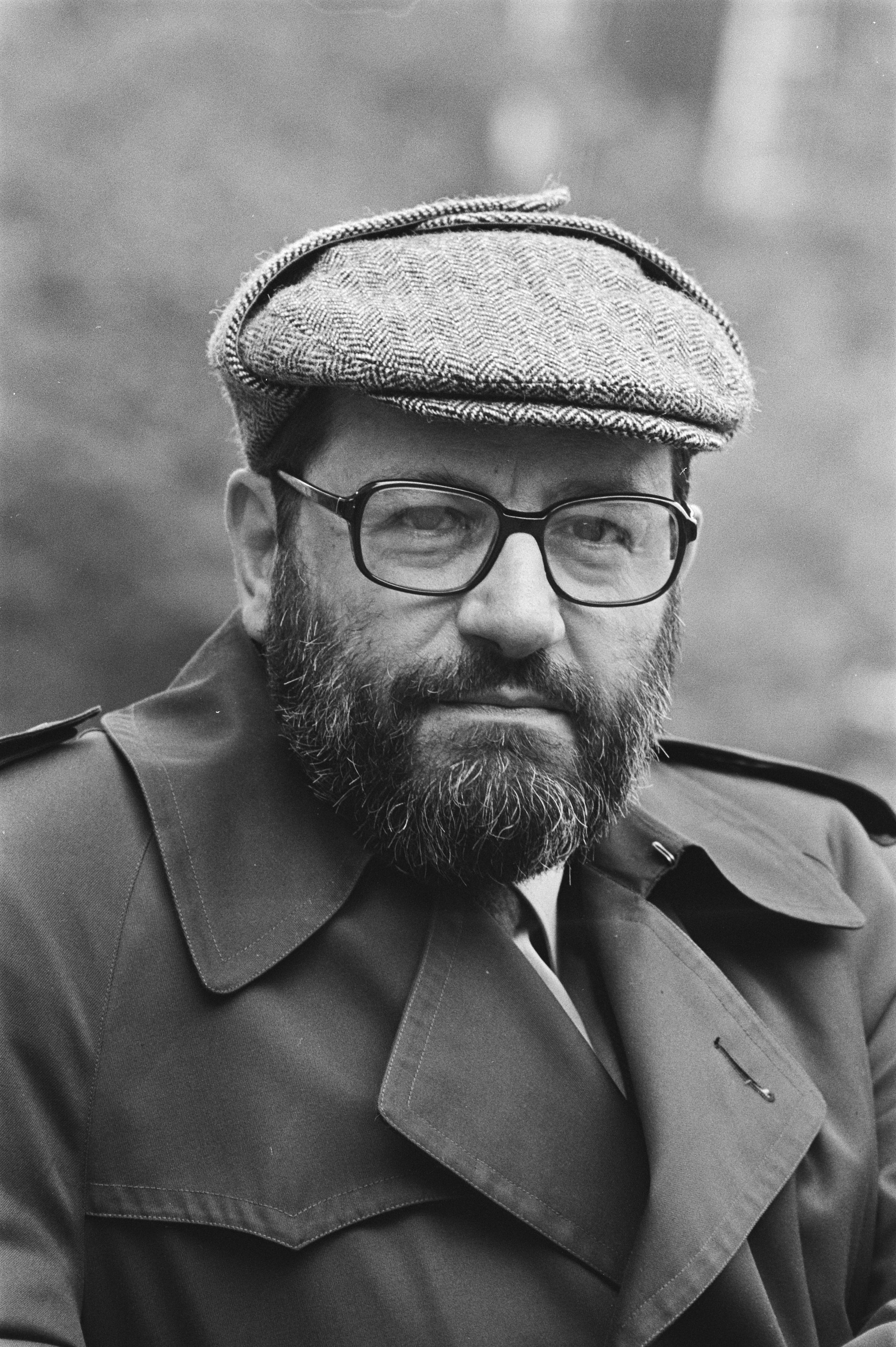
Umberto Eco

- Nicola Abbagnano
- Giorgio Agamben
- Evandro Agazzi
- Mario Albertini
- Rosario Assunto
- Franco Berardi
- Vincenzo Bianchini
- Cristina Bicchieri
- Norberto Bobbio
- Remo Bodei
- Diego Bubbio
- Massimo Cacciari
- Paola Cavalieri
- Silvio Ceccato
- Giorgio Colli
- Franca D'Agostini
- Francesco D'Agostino
- Maria Luisa Dalla Chiara
- Emanuele Coccia
- Guido del Giudice
- Augusto Del Noce
- Marino Di Teana
- Umberto Eco
- Roberto Esposito
- Cornelio Fabro
- Federico Ferrari
- Maurizio Ferraris
- Luciano Floridi
- Pieranna Garavaso
- Aldo Gargani
- Eugenio Garin
- Ludovico Geymonat
- Giulio Giorello
- Ernesto Grassi
- Luigi Gui
- Alberto Jori
- Marcello Landi
- Lanza del Vasto
- Bruno Leoni
- Domenico Losurdo
- Carlo Lottieri
- Lorenzo Magnani
- Michela Marzano
- Toni Negri
- Nuccio Ordine
- Gloria Origgi
- Bruno Osimo
- Tommaso Palamidessi
- Luigi Pareyson
- Alexandre Passerin d'Entrèves
- Carlo Penco
- Mario Perniola
- Eva Picardi
- Gualtiero Piccinini
- Massimo Pigliucci
- Costanzo Preve
- Paolo Rossi Monti
- Emanuele Severino
- Manlio Sgalambro
- Giulia Sissa
- Mario Tronti
- Achille Varzi
- Nicla Vassallo
- Gianni Vattimo
- Gianni Vattimo
- Paolo Virno
- Franco Volpi
- Giuseppe Zevola

== See also ==
- Italian philosophy
- List of philosophers
