= Albareto (meteorite) =

Meteorite found in Italy

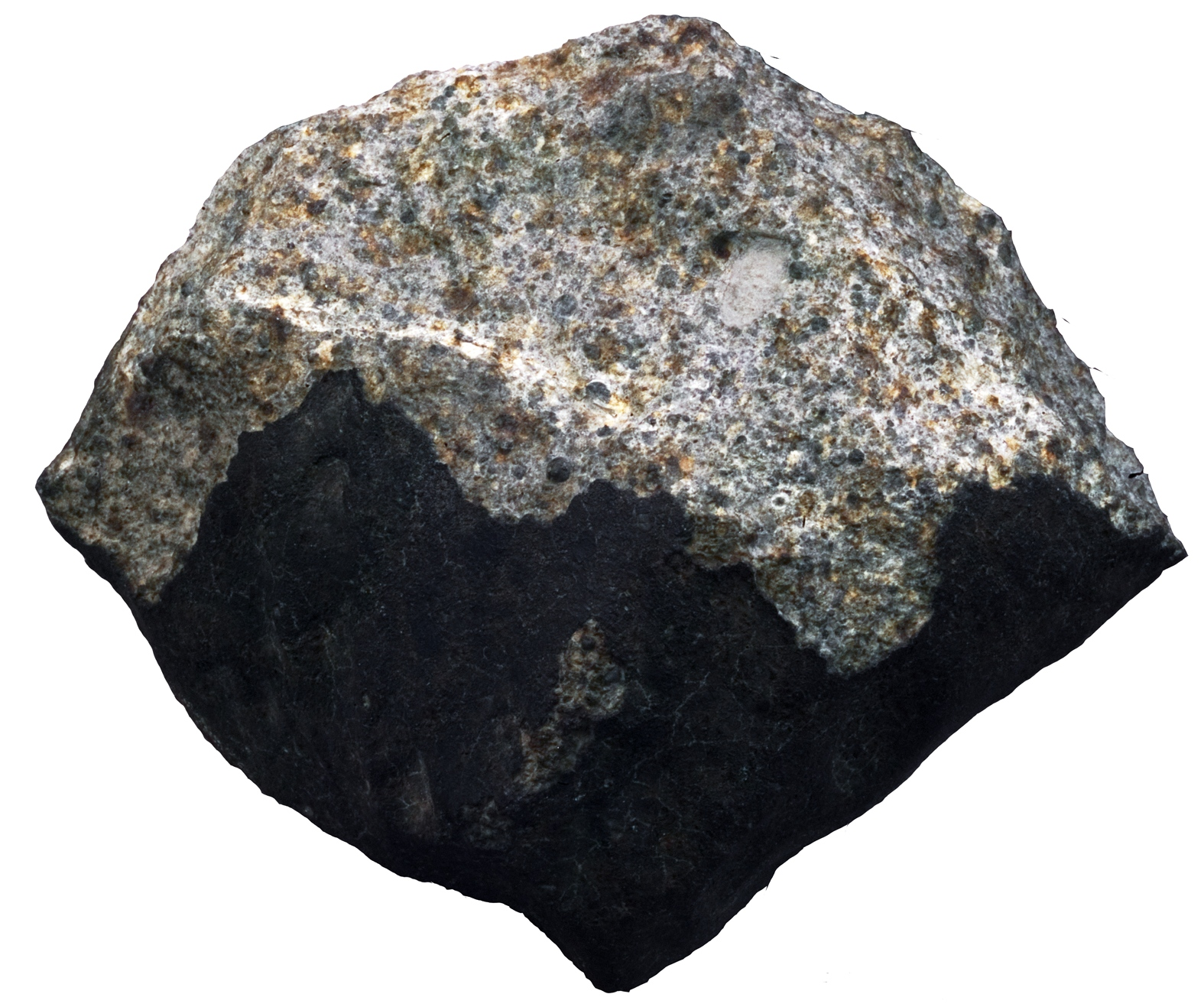
- Type: Chondrite
- Class: Ordinary chondrite
- Group: L/LL4
- Country: Italy
- Region: Emilia-Romagna
- Coordinates: 44°39′N 11°01′E
- Observed fall: Yes
- Fall date: July 1766
- TKW: 2 kg

Albareto is a meteorite which fell in July 1766 near the frazione Albareto, of Modena, Emilia-Romagna, Italy.

== Composition and classification ==
Albareto is a transitional ordinary chondrite between the L and the LL group. It belongs to the petrologic type 4.

== History ==
The fall of the Albareto's meteorite is documented in a document "Della caduta di un sasso dall'aria" of the natural philosopher Domenico Troili. Troili didn't realize the extraterrestrial origin of the object but provided with his treatise one of the first chronicles of the fall of a meteorite.

In addition to describing the phenomenon, Troili carefully examined and noted the meteorite grains of a mineral similar to brass, which he called "marchesita" and that for long was thought to be pyrite (FeS_{2}). In 1862 the German mineralogist Gustav Rose analyzed the composition of this mineral, and determined a different chemical formula: FeS. Rose called this new mineral Troilite in honor of Domenico Troili

== See also ==
- Glossary of meteoritics
- Meteorite
- Meteorite falls
- Ordinary chondrite
