= Frusta letteraria (magazine) =

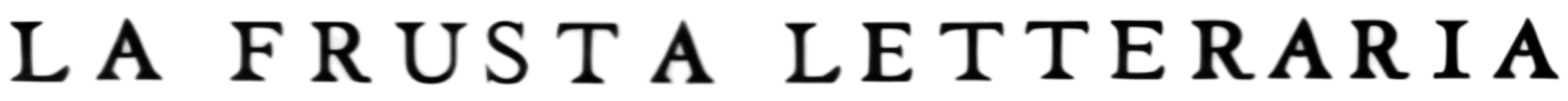

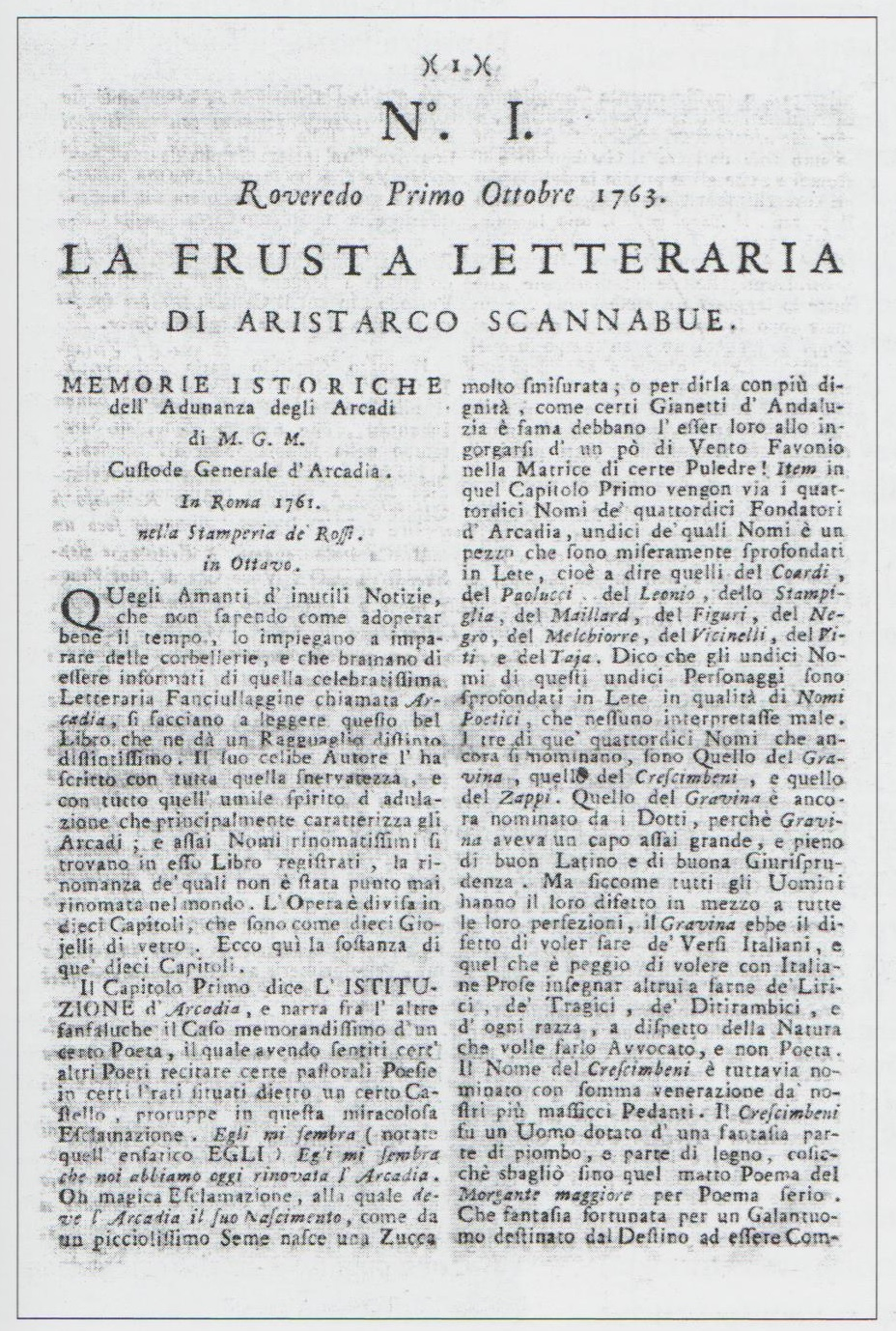
- First issue of Frusta letteraria (1763)
- Founder: Giuseppe Marc'Antonio Baretti
- First issue: 1 Occtober 1763
- Final issue: 15 July 1765
- Based in: Venice
- Language: Italian

Frusta letteraria (The literary whip) was a fortnightly periodical founded in Venice in 1763, directed and written almost entirely by Giuseppe Baretti, under the pseudonym of Aristarco Scannabue.

Published between 1763 and 1765, the magazine obtained a great success, especially for the polemical shots and the bright tones with which Baretti expressed his opinions towards numerous writers, his contemporaries or the past.

== History ==
During the years spent in England, Giuseppe Baretti had the opportunity to appreciate the liveliness of the English press. Back in Italy, he had decided to settle in Venice and to found a periodical on the model of Addison's and Steele's Spectator.

Baretti decided to sign the magazine under the pseudonym of Aristarco Scannabue, a character of his invention, to whom he dedicated a lively description in the introductory part. The figure he built, that of a former soldier who had fought for years in the East, was completely opposed to that of the eighteenth century academic scholar. Baretti imagined that Scannabue, after having retired to a country place, spent time reviewing, with strong criticism, all the books that were published and that were given to him by Don Pietro Zamberlucco, the parish priest of the place.

The first issue of the magazine came out on 1 October 1763 in Venice, but with the indication of Rovereto (a town located outside the borders of the Republic of Venice). The purpose of the founder was to avoid incurring the rigors of censorship. As for the title, the name "Frusta" (Whip) symbolizes the intentions of Baretti to whip metaphorically, through fierce criticism, all those who were considered by him as bad writers.

Baretti succeeded in gaining many readers, but at the same time there was no lack of controversy. At the beginning of 1765 the magazine came to the attention of the Reformers, the magistrature charged with monitoring the conformity of the printed works with the laws of the state. Numerous citizens, resentful of the criticisms made by Baretti against Pietro Bembo, a sixteenth-century poet, beloved by the Venetians, asked the Reformers to cease publication of the magazine. The magazine was not closed, but underwent strong censorship.

Baretti, who at first seemed to want to abandon the project, decided to move to another state. He began to print his periodical in Ancona, in the Papal States, starting from 1 April 1765. From then on, all the remaining eight issues of the magazine, from 19 April to 15 July 1765, were dedicated to the impetuous criticism against father Appiano Buonafede, who a few months earlier had published a work, full of rancor against Baretti, titled Novelle Menippee di Luciano da Firenzuola contro una certa Frusta pseudoepigrafa di Aristarco Scannabue.

== Bibliography ==
- Giuseppe Baretti, La Frusta Letteraria, ed. by Luigi Piccioni, Bari: Laterza, 1932, 2 vols.
- Giuseppe Baretti, Opere Scelte, ed. by Bruno Maier, Turin: UTET, 1972, 2 vols.
- Giuseppe Baretti, La Frusta Letteraria, with a preface by Massimo Bontempelli, Milan: Istituto Editoriale Italiano, 1910, 2 vols.
- Giuseppe Baretti, La Frusta Letteraria, ed. by Ferdinando Giannessi, Treviso: Canova, 1974.
