= Cranbourne meteorite =

Second largest meteorite found in Australia

Cranbourne
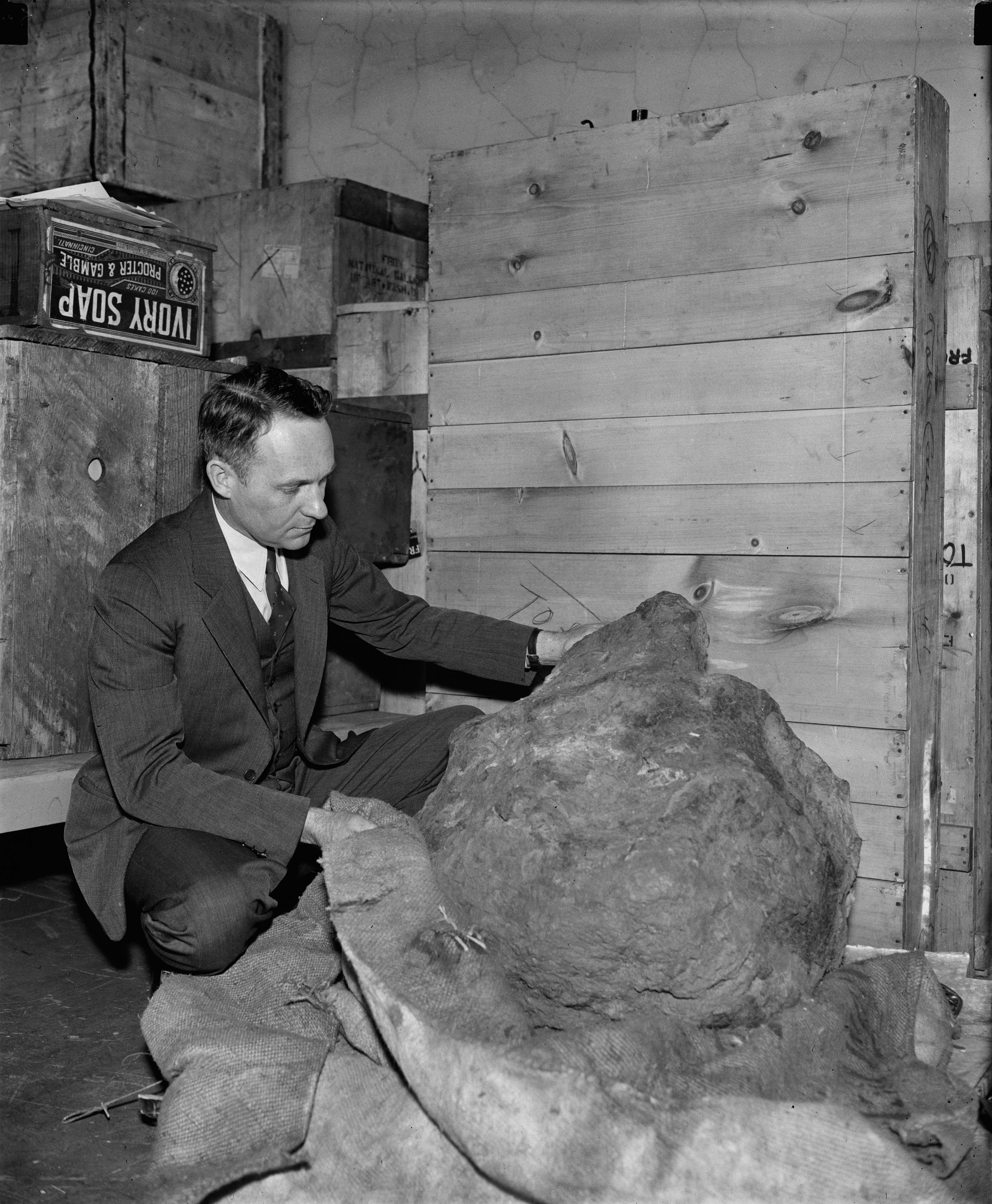
- Fragment known as Cranbourne 11, or "Pearcedale", held by the National Museum of Natural History (Smithsonian) in Washington, D.C.
- Group: IAB Main group (MG)
- Country: Australia
- Region: Victoria
- Coordinates: 38°6′S 145°18′E
- Observed fall: No
- Fall date: c.1780
- Found date: unknown (main mass known about since 1830s)
- TKW: 8,600 kilograms (19,000 lb)
- Strewn field: Yes

The Cranbourne meteorite is an octahedrite iron meteorite, classified as a main group IAB meteorite. It is the second largest meteorite found in Australia after the Mundrabilla meteorite, but at the time of reporting it was the largest known meteorite in the world. As one piece of a group of 13 fragments that together are known as the Cranbourne Meteorites, it is also known as Cranbourne 1 or the Bruce Meteorite. It is held by the Natural History Museum in London, after being sent to England in 1865 as an exchange for a smaller fragment known as Cranbourne 2, or the Abel Meteorite, which had been sent to England in 1861. These two were the largest pieces, weighing in at 3,550 kg (7,830 lb) and 1,525 kg (3,362 lb) respectively. Cranbourne 3 was lost in shipping, and the remaining 10 fragments are held in various museums in Australia, England, and the United States.

== History ==
=== Discovery by Europeans ===
Of the 13 fragments that have so far been found, the largest mass, the Bruce Meteorite (Cranbourne 1), which weighs 3.5 tonnes (3,550 kg (7,830 lb)), was found on the land of a cattle grazier by the name of McKay. It is believed he had known about the mass since he moved into the area, now Devon Meadows, in 1836. A fragment of the Bruce Meteorite, that had been made into a horse shoe had been displayed at an exhibition in Melbourne in 1854, by James A. Scott, but at that time its meteoric origins were not known. Scott described it as "A specimen of iron from Western Port" - the first written record of any of the fragments.

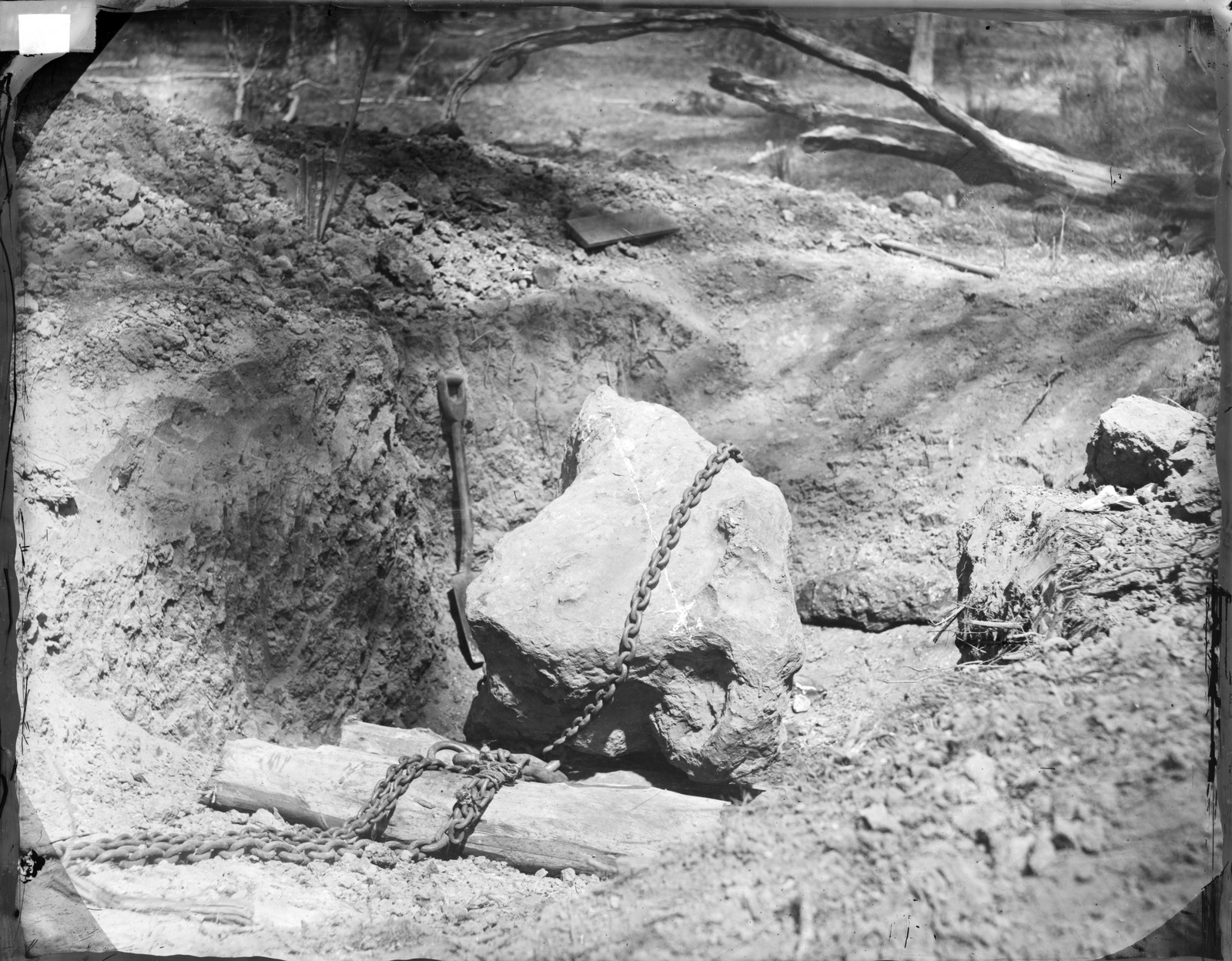
Cranbourne 1, the Bruce Meteorite, being excavated in February 1862 (State Library Victoria pictures collection)

Colonists at the time thought that there must be a seam of iron underneath the earth, and tried digging to uncover the mineral, realising that it must have other origins when none was found. Both Cranbourne 1 and 2 were first recognised as meteoric in 1860 when the Melbourne Town Clerk, Edmund Gerald FitzGibbon, an amateur geologist, visited the sites of both the Bruce and Abel fragments. Then in 1861, renowned German meteorologist Georg von Neumayer and some other scientists visited the sites and performed scientific experiments on them, thus confirming their meteoric origin. at the time of discovery it was the largest known meteorite in the world.

Cranbourne 1, the Bruce Meteorite, was purchased by a neighbour of McKay, on whose land it had fallen, named James Bruce. Bruce wished to donate it to the British Museum, and so arranged with Ferdinand von Mueller to have it transported to The University of Melbourne to have it exhibited before its long journey to London. While it was being held here, petitions were made by members of Melbourne's Royal Society of Victoria to have it retained in the colony. Eventually it was agreed to have it sent to the British Museum in exchange for the Abel Meteorite, which had been sent to England in 1861. In 1865, the Bruce meteorite arrived in the British Museum, which later became the Natural History Museum in London. However, as of 2026, it is not on display in the museum.

Cranbourne 2, the Abel Meteorite, was found on land belonging to a Mr Lineham. It was purchased by a Ballarat mineralogist named August Theodore Abel, who had accompanied Von Neuymayer to the sites in 1861. The same year, Abel sold the fragment to the British Museum in London for 300 pounds, before it was returned to the National Museum of Victoria (now Melbourne Museum) in Melbourne in 1865. As of 2026 Cranbourne 2, which weighs 1,525 kg (3,362 lb), is held by Museums Victoria.

Cranbourne 3 was first been found by a farmhand around 1857 and used as an andiron (also known as a hob - used in a wood-fired stove). Estimated to weigh around 6.8 kg (15 lb) in total originally, it was broken by the farmer using it, and by the time its real composition was uncovered in 1860, only a 3.2 kg (7.1 lb) fragment was left, the rest having been thrown away. When this piece was sent off for analysis, it was lost in transit, and never recovered.

A total of nine more fragments were discovered between 1876 and 1928.

Cranbourne 9, aka the Beaconsfield iron or meteorite, was found in 1876 around 3 km (1.9 mi) east of the Beaconsfield Railway Station. It weighed 74.9 kg (165 lb). It was sold to a German mineral dealer who cut it into pieces and sold them off.

Cranbourne 10, aka the Langwarrin meteorite, was found In 1866 by a farmer in a field around 8 km (5.0 mi) south-east of the Langwarrin railway station, who just pushed it aside. After a government geologist visited and recognised the object, the farmer sent it to the National Museum of Victoria, where it weighed in at 915 kg (2,017 lb). The main part of this meteorite was acquired by the museum in 1886 and is as of July 2026 on display in Melbourne Museum. (Note: Oz Geology says that it was sold to the National Museum of Natural History (Smithsonian) in 1938, along with Cranbourne 11. However, following an email enquiry (by editor Laterthanyouthink), Museums Victoria responded on 17 July 2026: "...from our geosciences collection manager Oskar Lindenmayer: The main mass of the ~ 900 kg Cranbourne No. 10 (aka the Langwarrin meteorite) has been in Victoria's State collection since 1886 and is currently on display. A piece has been sawn off one edge of the meteorite to reveal its internal material, so it is possible that some small pieces of this sawn edge could be in the collections of the Smithsonian. It sounds like the Ozgeology blog is confusing it with Cranbourne No. 11 (aka the Pearcedale meteorite), which I believe was sold to the Smithsonian. This was another large piece at ~700 kg.)

Cranbourne 11 was found just below the surface of the ground in or around 1903, 2 km (1.2 mi) north north-east of Pearcedale, and thus dubbed "Pearcedale". It weighed 762 kg (1,680 lb). It was not immediately reported, and was kept by the finder until 1938, when it was bought by the National Museum of Natural History (Smithsonian) in Washington, D.C..

Four meteorites (Cranbourne 4, 5, 7, & 8; the Devon Meadows Cluster) were found in 1923, at shallow depths in a field not far away from where Cranbourne 1 had been located. No. 4 was the largest at 1,270 kg (2,800 lb). Cranbourne 5 weighed 356 kg (785 lb); 7 weighed 153 kg (337 lb), and 8 weighed 23.6 kg (52 lb). Museums Victoria holds number 4, while the rest are held in Melbourne by the Victorian Geological Survey and the University of Melbourne, both in Melbourne.

Cranbourne 6, or the Pakenham meteorite, was found in 1928 around 1.3 km (0.81 mi) west of Tomuc Creek, near Pakenham, in the course of roadworks to widen the Princes Highway. It weighed 40.5 kg (89 lb). It was given to the Victorian Geological Survey in Melbourne.

Cranbourne 13 was discovered in 2008 in Clyde, not far from the location of the Abel Iron. It was found by a market gardener who dug up the rock and was about to dispose of it before an acquaintance encouraged him to have it tested, and geologists at Museums Victoria confirmed that it was a part of the Cranbourne meteorites. It weighs around 85 kg (187 lb).

=== Aboriginal significance ===
Bunurong Aboriginal people knew of the meteorites as "Kuunhdurt Laang", meaning "fire star rock". In Aboriginal mythology, they came from the creator being Bunjil, who was often characterised as a wedge-tailed eagle, to teach the people, especially young men, to behave properly, and how to look after Country. The place where it fell was regarded as a sacred site and used as a significant meeting place, as well as part of an ancient Songline, one of many that criss-crossed the continent.

After the meteorites had been discovered by Europeans, old colonists reported that, years previously, Aboriginal people used to "dance around the meteorite, beating their stone tomahawks against it, and apparently much pleased with the metallic sound thus produced". A woman who lived on the property where Cranbourne 2 was found and removed told her granddaughter that Kuunhdurt Laang "was so special [to the Bunurong people] that they cried when they saw it being taken away".

Today (2026), Bunurong people still pass on the stories and speak the songs associated with Kuunhdurt Laang, but they are unable to sing or dance them without their presence in the landscape. The Natural History Museum has offered to talk to Bunurong elder Aunty Gail Kunwarra Dawson about Cranbourne 1, but that it was limited in what it was able to do under UK legislation regarding repatriation.

== Description ==
It is surmised that the Cranbourne meteorites probably fell during the Pleistocene (4,000 to 20,000 years ago), and did not cause craters because by the time they hit the earth, they had broken up and slowed down. Their flight path was oblique, meaning more time spent in the Earth's atmosphere, which slowed them further. They are all in the most common grouping of iron meteorite, the Octahedrites.

The Cranbourne meteorite is the second largest meteorite found in Australia after the Mundrabilla meteorite. It is classified as a main group IAB meteorite. The total known weight of all the fragments is 8,600 kilograms (19,000 lb).

A crust of limonite coats the fragments from Oxidisation, but weathering has occurred on the outer layer of the fragments, and other minerals have been discovered, including trevorite and small amounts of iron and nickel chlorides. It was reported in December 2024 that traces of the mineral muonionalustaite, first discovered in 2021, had been discovered on a fragment of the meteorite held by the Melbourne Museum.

== In popular culture ==
The Cranbourne meteorite is the subject of "Fire Star Rock", an episode in the TV documentary series Stuff the British Stole, first broadcast in 2026, giving a contemporary Indigenous Australian perspective of its cultural value, which records their oral tradition of witnessing its fall, and their sense of loss at its removal.

== Locations ==
The following table lists all the fragments of the Cranbourne meteorite and their location as of 2025:

Fragment	Name	Year identified	Mass [kg]	Location
Cranbourne 1	Bruce	1860	3550	Natural History Museum, London, UK
Cranbourne 2	Abel	1860	1525	Melbourne Museum (Museums Victoria)
Cranbourne 3	-	1860	~6.8	Lost (1860)
Cranbourne 4	-	1923	1270	Melbourne Museum
Cranbourne 5	-	1923	356	Collection of the Department of Mines (Archive)
Cranbourne 6	Pakenham	1928	40.5	Geological Survey Museum, Melbourne
Cranbourne 7	-	1923	153	University of Melbourne collection
Cranbourne 8	-	1923	23.6	Geological Survey Museum, Melbourne
Cranbourne 9	Beaconsfield	1876	74.9	Cut into pieces and sold
Cranbourne 10	Langwarrin	1886	914	Melbourne Museum
Cranbourne 11	Pearcedale	1903	762	National Museum of Natural History (Smithsonian), US
Cranbourne 12	-	1982	23	City of Casey (on loan from Museums Victoria)
Cranbourne 13	-	2008	85	City of Casey (on loan from Museums Victoria)

== See also ==
- Glossary of meteoritics
