= Federico Ferrari =

Federico Ferrari may refer to:

- Federico Ferrari (philosopher) (born 1969), Italian philosopher and art critic
- Federico Ferrari Orsi (1886–1942), general in the Royal Italian Army during World War II
