= Troilite =

Rare iron sulfide mineral: FeS

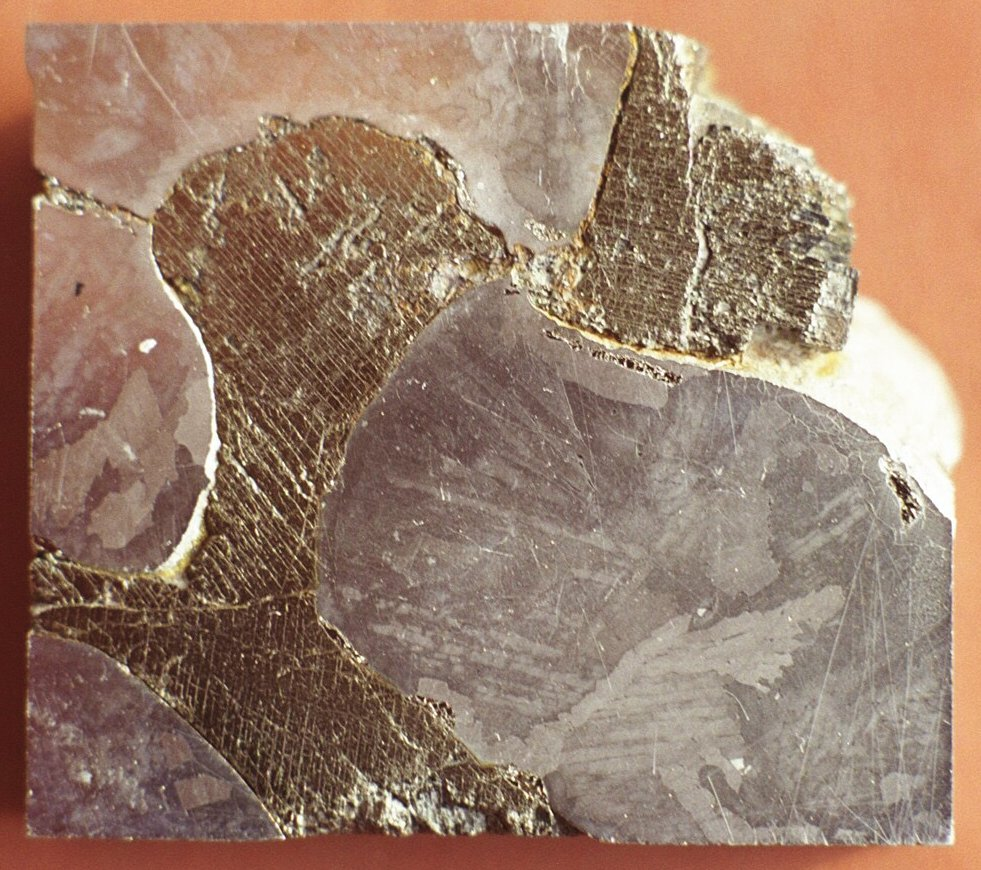
- Polished and etched surface of the Mundrabilla meteorite from Australia. The darker brownish areas with striations are troilite with exolved daubréelite.

General
- Category: Sulfide mineral
- Formula: FeS
- IMA symbol: Tro
- Strunz classification: 2.CC.10
- Crystal system: Hexagonal
- Crystal class: Ditrigonal dipyramidal (6̅m2); H-M symbol: (6̅m2)
- Space group: P6̅2c
- Unit cell: a = 5.958, c = 11.74 [Å]; Z = 12

Identification
- Color: Pale gray brown
- Crystal habit: Massive, granular; nodular; platey to tabular
- Cleavage: None
- Fracture: Irregular
- Mohs scale hardness: 3.5–4.0
- Luster: Metallic
- Streak: Gray black
- Diaphaneity: Opaque
- Specific gravity: 4.67–4.79
- Alters to: Tarnishes on exposure to air

Troilite (/ˈtrɔɪlaɪt/) is a rare iron sulfide mineral with the simple formula of FeS. It is the iron-rich endmember of the pyrrhotite group. Pyrrhotite has the formula Fe_{(1−x)}S (x = 0 to 0.2) which is iron deficient. As troilite lacks the iron deficiency which gives pyrrhotite its characteristic magnetism, troilite is non-magnetic.

Troilite can be found as a native mineral on Earth but is more abundant in meteorites, in particular, those originating from the Moon and Mars. It is among the minerals found in samples of the meteorite that struck Russia in Chelyabinsk on February 15th, 2013. Uniform presence of troilite on the Moon and possibly on Mars has been confirmed by the Apollo, Viking and Phobos space probes. The relative intensities of isotopes of sulfur are rather constant in meteorites as compared to the Earth minerals, and therefore troilite from Canyon Diablo meteorite is chosen as the international sulfur isotope ratio standard, the Canyon Diablo Troilite (CDT).

== Structure ==
Troilite has hexagonal structure (Pearson symbol hP24, Space group P-62c No 190). Its unit cell is approximately a combination of two vertically stacked basic NiAs-type cells of pyrrhotite, where the top cell is diagonally shifted. For this reason, troilite is sometimes called pyrrhotite-2C.

== Discovery ==
A meteorite fall was observed in 1766 at Albareto, Modena, Italy. Samples were collected and studied by Domenico Troili who described the iron sulfide inclusions in the meteorite. These iron sulfides were long considered to be pyrite (i.e. FeS_{2}). In 1862, German mineralogist Gustav Rose analyzed the material and recognized it as stoichiometric 1:1 FeS and gave it the name troilite in recognition of the work of Domenico Troili.

== Occurrence ==
Troilite has been reported from a variety of meteorites occurring with daubréelite, chromite, sphalerite, graphite, and a variety of phosphate and silicate minerals. It has also been reported from serpentinite in the Alta mine, Del Norte County, California, and in layered igneous intrusions in Western Australia, the Ilimaussaq intrusion of southern Greenland, the Bushveld Complex in South Africa and at Nordfjellmark, Norway. In the South African and Australian occurrence, it is associated with copper, nickel, platinum, and iron ore deposits occurring with pyrrhotite, pentlandite, mackinawite, cubanite, valleriite, chalcopyrite and pyrite.

Troilite is extremely rarely encountered in the Earth's crust (even pyrrhotite is relatively rare compared to pyrite and iron(II) sulfate minerals). Most troilite on Earth is of meteoritic origin. One iron meteorite, Mundrabilla contains 25 to 35 volume percent troilite. The most famous troilite-containing meteorite is Canyon Diablo. Canyon Diablo Troilite (CDT) is used as a standard of relative concentration of different isotopes of sulfur. A meteoritic standard was chosen because of the constancy of the sulfur isotopic ratio in meteorites, whereas the sulfur isotopic composition in Earth materials varies due to the bacterial activity. In particular, certain sulfate reducing bacteria (SRB) can reduce ^{32}SO^{2−}_{4} 1.07 times faster than ^{34}SO^{2−}_{4}, which may increase the ^{34}S/^{32}S ratio in the residual sulfate by up to 10 % while this ratio simultaneously decreases in the reduced sulfides. So, the ^{34}S/^{32}S ratio is a helpful indicator for microbial sulfate reduction.

Troilite is the most common sulfide mineral at the lunar surface. It forms about one percent of the lunar crust and is present in any rock or meteorite originating from the Moon. In particular, all basalts brought by the Apollo 11, 12, 15 and 16 missions contain about 1% troilite.

Troilite is regularly found in Martian meteorites (i.e. those originating from Mars). Similar to the Moon's surface and meteorites, the fraction of troilite in Martian meteorites is close to 1%.

Based on observations by the Voyager spacecraft in 1979 and Galileo in 1996, troilite might also be present in the rocks of Jupiter's satellites Ganymede and Callisto. Whereas experimental data for Jupiter's moons are yet very limited, the theoretical modeling assumes large percentage of troilite (c. 22.5%) in the core of those moons.

== See also ==
- Glossary of meteoritics
- Isotope fractionation
- Kinetic fractionation
