= Cristina Bicchieri =

Italian–American philosopher

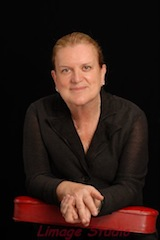
- Bicchieri in 2011
- Born: Milan

Philosophical work
- Era: 20th-/21st-century philosophy
- Region: Western philosophy
- School: Analytic
- Main interests: Philosophy of social science, rational choice, game theory

Cristina Bicchieri (born 1950) is an Italian–American philosopher. She is the S.J.P. Harvie Professor of Social Thought and Comparative Ethics in the Philosophy and Psychology Departments at the University of Pennsylvania, professor of Legal Studies in the Wharton School, and director of the Master in Behavioral Decision Sciences program (https://www.lps.upenn.edu/degree-programs/mbds) and the Philosophy, Politics and Economics program. She has worked on problems in the philosophy of social science, rational choice and game theory. More recently, her work has focused on the nature and evolution of social norms, and the design of behavioral experiments to test under which conditions norms will be followed. She is a leader in the field of behavioral ethics and is the director of the Center for Social Norms and Behavioral Dynamics at the University of Pennsylvania.

== Life and career ==
Bicchieri was born in Milan, Italy. She received her laurea in philosophy, summa cum laude, from the University of Milan in 1976, and her PhD in philosophy of science at Cambridge University in 1984. Before moving to the University of Pennsylvania, she taught in the program of Philosophy and Economics at Barnard College, Columbia University, in the Philosophy department at Notre Dame University and in the departments of Philosophy and Social and Decision Sciences at Carnegie Mellon University. In the Spring of 1998, Bicchieri was a Fellow at the Swedish Collegium for Advanced Study in Uppsala, Sweden.

She is also a member of the advisory board at the School of Government at LUISS University of Rome, where she occasionally teaches.

Bicchieri has served as a consultant to UNICEF since 2008, and she has advised various NGOs and other international organizations on social norms and how to deal with them when combating negative social practices. Her work on social norms has been adopted by UNICEF in its campaigns to eliminate practices that violate human rights.

She was knighted Cavaliere Ordine al Merito della Repubblica Italiana in 2007. In 2020 she was elected to the Germany National Academy of Science, Leopoldina. In 2021, she was elected a Fellow of the American Academy of Arts and Sciences. She is an Honorary Fellow of Wolfson College at Cambridge University.

== Philosophical work ==
Bicchieri is especially known for her work regarding the epistemic foundations of game theory and social norms. Her recent experimental work is a major contribution to behavioral ethics, as it shows how different kind of expectations influence pro-social behavior. The Behavioral Ethics Lab which she leads specializes in the study of social norms, moral heuristics, biases, resource division, cheating, corruption, measures of autonomy and their relation to social change.

=== Social norms ===
Bicchieri has developed a new theory of social norms that challenges several of the fundamental methodological assumptions of the social sciences. She argues that the emphasis social scientists place upon rational deliberation obscures the fact that many successful choices occur even though the individuals make their choices without much deliberation. She explores in depth the more automatic components of coordination and proposes a heuristic account of coordination that complements the more traditional deliberational account. According to her heuristic account, individuals conform with a social norm as an automatic response to cues in their situation that focus their attention on this particular norm. A social norm is analyzed as a rule for choosing in a mixed-motive game, such as the prisoner's dilemma, that members of a population prefer to follow on condition that they expect sufficiently many in the population to follow the rule. Bicchieri applies this account of social norms and heuristic selection of norms to a number of important problems in the social sciences, including bargaining, the prisoners' dilemma and suboptimal norms based upon pluralistic ignorance.

Her most recent research is experimental, showing how normative and empirical expectations support norm compliance, and how manipulating such expectations can radically change behavior. Her experimental results show that most subjects have a conditional preference for following pro-social norms. Manipulating their expectations causes major behavioral changes (i.e., from fair to unfair choices, from cooperation to defection). She asserts that there are no such things as stable dispositions or unconditional preferences (to be fair, reciprocate, cooperate, and so on). She similarly concludes that policymakers who want to induce pro-social behavior have to work on changing people's expectations about how others behave and how others think one should behave in similar situations (i.e. people's empirical and normative expectations). These results have major consequences for our understanding of moral behavior and the construction of better normative theories, grounded on what people can in fact do.

=== Epistemic foundations of game theory ===
Bicchieri pioneered work on counterfactuals and belief-revision in games, and the consequences of relaxing the common knowledge assumption. Her contributions include axiomatic models of players' theory of the game and the proof that—in a large class of games—a player's theory of the game is consistent only if the player's knowledge is limited. An important consequence of assuming bounded knowledge is that it allows for more intuitive solutions to familiar games such as the finitely repeated prisoner's dilemma or the chain-store paradox. Bicchieri has also devised mechanical procedures (algorithms) that allow players to compute solutions for games of perfect and imperfect information. Devising such procedures is particularly important for Artificial Intelligence applications, since interacting software agents have to be programmed to play a variety of 'games'.

== Books ==
- Norms in the Wild: How to Diagnose, Measure and Change Social Norms (Oxford University Press, 2016) ISBN 9780190622053
- The Grammar of Society: The Nature and Dynamics of Social Norms (Cambridge University Press, 2006) ISBN 0-521-57490-0
- The Logic of Strategy (with Brian Skyrms and Richard Jeffrey) (Oxford University Press, 1999) ISBN 978-0-19-511715-8
- The Dynamics of Norms (with Brian Skyrms and Richard Jeffrey) (Cambridge University Press, 1997) ISBN 0-521-56062-4
- Rationality and Coordination (Cambridge University Press, 1993; Second edition, 1997) ISBN 0-521-57444-7
- Knowledge, Belief and Strategic Interaction (with Maria Luisa Dalla Chiara) (Cambridge University Press, 1992) ISBN 0-521-41674-4
- Ragioni per Credere, Ragioni per Fare: Convenzioni e Vincoli nel Metodo Scientifico (Feltrinelli, 1988) ISBN 9788807101007

== See also ==
- Italian philosophy
- List of Italian philosophers
