= Bernardino Varisco =

Italian philosopher (1850–1933)

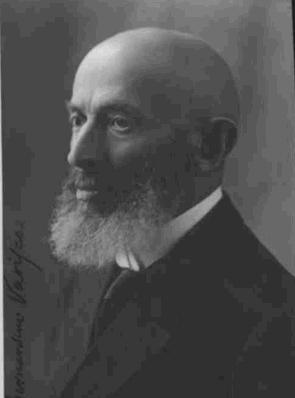
Bernardino Varisco

Bernardino Varisco (April 20, 1850 – October 21, 1933) was an Italian philosopher and a professor of Theoretical Philosophy at the University of Rome La Sapienza from 1905 to 1925.

== Life ==
Bernardino Varisco was born on April 20, 1850, in Chiari, a commune in the province of Brescia, in Lombardy, northern Italy. His mother was the daughter of the Italian philosopher Francesco Bonatelli and his father, Carlo, was the director of the Ginnasio Locale (public school) in Chiari. After the death of his mother in 1864, Varisco pursued classical studies at the Collegio Nazionale di Torino, and finally completed them first at the University of Padua then later at the University of Pavia where he graduated with a degree in mathematics. From 1874 to 1905, he taught as a professor of mathematics at various secondary schools and technical colleges. In 1906, he was appointed Professor of Theoretical Philosophy at the University of Rome La Sapienza, where he remained until his retirement in 1925.

After his retirement from the University of Rome in 1925, Varisco returned to Brescia. In 1928, he was appointed as a Senatore del Regno (national senator). He died at the age of 83 in his hometown on October 21, 1933. Bernardino's tomb is located in the Varisco family area of the town cemetery of Chiari. Above his tomb stands a bronze bust of the philosopher with the stern gaze of a man who spent his life absorbed in philosophical thought.

== Philosophy ==
Varisco's early philosophy adhered to the positivism and the empiricism that underlies the fundamental presuppositions of science. This position later evolved into something closer to a pluralistic form of idealism with strong theological tendencies. In his later years he eventually arrived at a blend of monadology and panpsychism. The most obscure and therefore weakest part of Varisco's philosophy was his attempt to move from the apparent plurality of subjects to an all-encompassing unitary reality. In his posthumous work Dall'uoma a Dio (From Man to God) he completed his gradual transformation from positivism to theism by arguing for a God who limits Himself by his own creation in order that we human beings can cooperate with Him in creative activity. Varisco, therefore, believed that philosophy supports a religious attitude of life fully compatible with the tenets of Christianity. His eventual metaphysical view was thus a pluralistic form of Philosophy of Spirit similar to the works of Gottfried Wilhelm Leibniz and Hermann Lotze. There is also a strong similarity between the philosophical theories of Bernardino Varisco and his British counterpart, James Ward.

Although his work is seldom referenced by contemporary philosophers, during Varisco's lifetime his reputation was considerable both in the United States and in Europe—especially in Italy. In fact, two of his major works were translated into English in order to accommodate popular demand.

== Principal works ==
- Scienze e opinioni. Rome, 1901.
- La conoscenza. Pavia, 1905.
- I massimi problemi. Milan, 1910.
- Conosci te stesso. Milan, 1912.
- The Great Problems., translated by R. C. Lodge, London: Allen, 1914.
- Know Thyself., translated by Guglielmo Salvadori, London: Allen and Unwin, 1915.
- Linee di filosofia critica. Rome, 1925.
- Sommario di filosofia. Rome, 1928.
- Dall'uomo a Dio Padua, 1939, (released posthumously.)

== Works on Varisco ==
- Chiapetta, L. La teodicea di Bernardino Varisco. Naples, 1938.
- De Negri, E. La metafisica di Bernardino Varisco. Florence, 1929.
- Drago, P. C. La filosofia di Bernardino Varisco. Florence, 1944.
- Librizzi, C. Il pensiero di Bernardino Varisco. Padua, 1944; rev. ed., 1953.
