= Domenico Troili =

Italian cleric in minor orders and Jesuit (1722–1792)

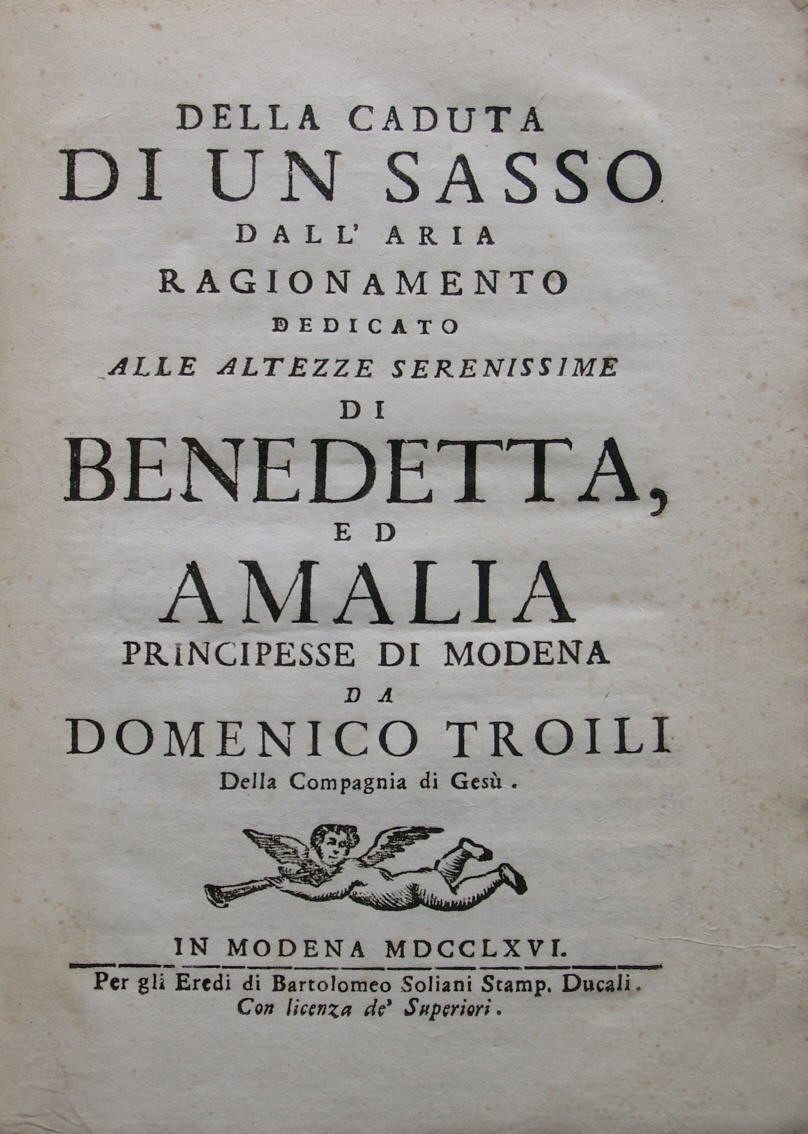

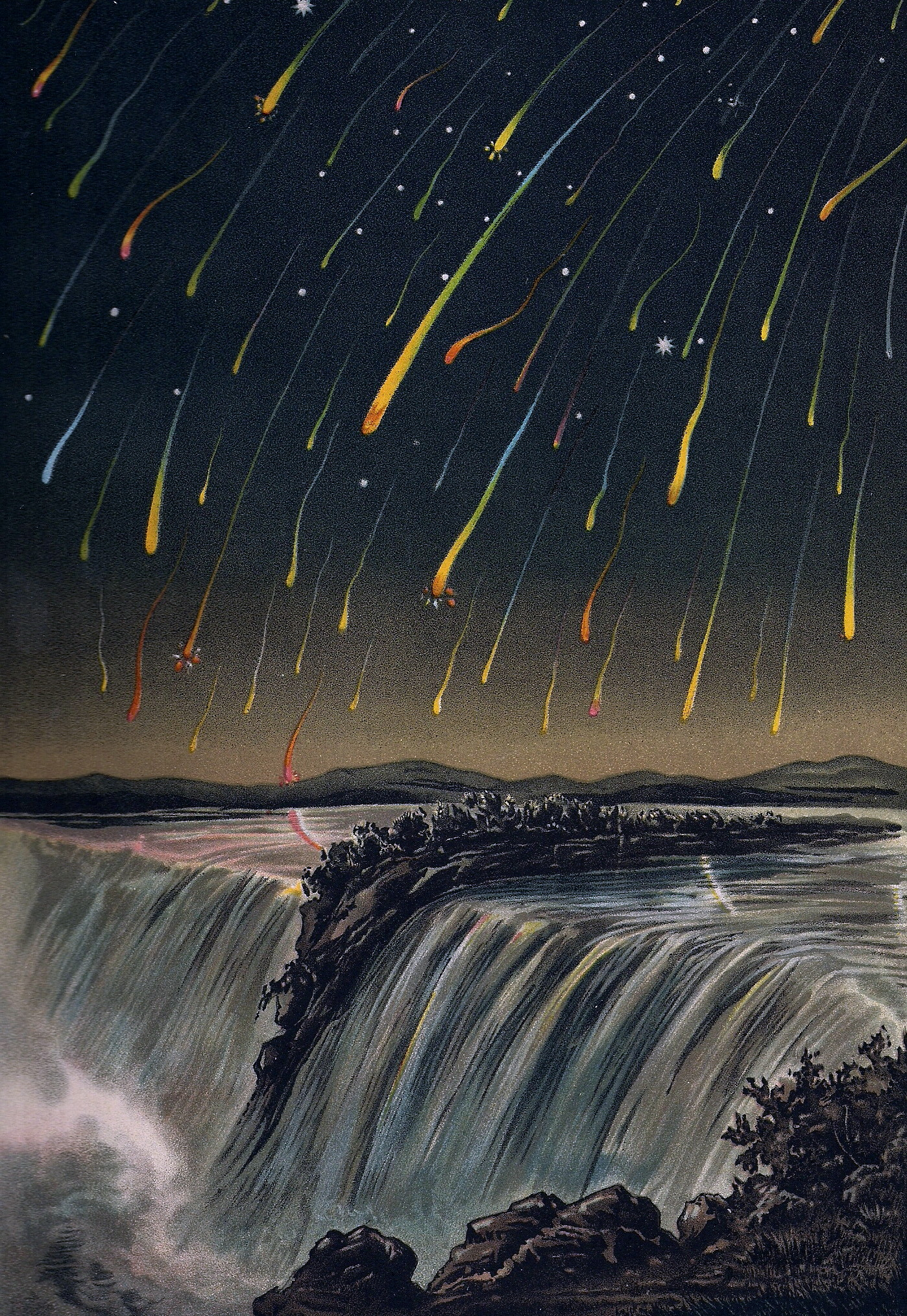
An illustration (1833) of the Victorian vision of a meteorite storm

Domenico Troili (1722–1792) was an Italian abbate and a Jesuit, who held the appointment of custodian of the library of the ruling family of Este in Modena. He is recognized as the first person who documented the fall of a meteorite, in 1766.

Troili was a pupil of Roger Joseph Boscovich at the Collegio Romano, and supported his master's atomic theory explaining the properties of matter.

== The Albareto meteorite ==
In 1766, Troili witnessed the fall of a stone from the sky near the town of Albareto, in the Duchy of Parma, Italy. He collected reports from many other eyewitnesses, closely examined the stone and detected in it small grains of a brassy mineral. He called the material "marchesita" (from Italian "little marchioness"). Troili summarized the results of his research in a 43-page document, Ragionamento della caduta di un sasso ("Concerning the fall of a stone from the air") published in Modena in 1766.

The report by Troili said that at about five hours after midday, when the sky was clear except for some clouds over the mountains on the far horizon, many people leaving their fields suddenly saw distant flashes of lightning and heard thunder. This rose in a crescendo of cannonading with loud explosions overhead. Numerous people saw a body streak across the sky and plunge to the ground. To some, the trail looked bright and fiery; to others, dark and smoky. The body hit the ground with such a force that a cow was knocked off its feet and two women clung to trees to avoid falling. The stone made a hole a meter deep in the earth and instantly broke into many pieces. It was a stone that was very heavy, irregular in shape, and magnetic. The outer surface looked as though it had been burned by fire. The inner parts looked much like sandstone with small steely sparkles.

Approximately 2 kilograms of the stone were recovered. Today, its small fragments are dispersed in numerous museums and laboratories, with the largest piece of 605 g located in the Museum of the University of Modena. The main component of the meteorite was long assumed to be pyrite, FeS_{2}. However, in 1862, German mineralogist Gustav Rose analyzed the composition and determined it as FeS, an iron sulfide. Rose named this new mineral troilite after Troili. Although the work by Troili is widely recognized as describing a meteoritic fall, Troili himself, though searching for a scientific explanation in the spirit of the Enlightenment, did not recognize its extraterrestrial origin, but instead attributed the event to a by-product of a volcanic eruption: "the true cause of the fall of a stone in Albereto in mid-July, 1766, is a subterranean explosion that hurled the stone skyward"

== Other investigations ==
His report Dell'oriuolo oltramontano ragionamento (Modena: Soliani) 1757, was concerned with the method of hour-reckoning familiar to us, but "foreign"— "ultramontane"— in Italy, of two sequences of twelve fixed hours each, not adjusted according to seasonal daylight; it was called "small" or "half clock" in the Old World, from an Italian perspective orologio (oriuolo) oltramontano.

In 1770 appeared his Dissertazione sopra un legno fossile co-authored with Giambattista Toderini; it was concerned with explaining the origin of fossil wood.

His report of electrical experiments, Della elettricità: lezioni di fisica sperimentale fatte nella Università di Modena il primo anno del suo rinnovamento, was published at Modena, 1772.

== Works ==
- Dell'oriuolo oltramontano (in Italian). Modena: eredi Bartolomeo Soliani (2.). 1757. Bibcode:1757doo..book.....T.
- Della caduta di un sasso dall'aria (in Italian). Modena: eredi Bartolomeo Soliani (2.). 1766.
