= Giuseppe Zevola =

Italian painter

Giuseppe Zevola (born 1952) is an Italian painter, philosopher and poet.

== Life ==
Zevola was born in 1952 in Naples. He has taught courses on painting at the Academy of Art of Rome and Catania and Perception and Visual Communication at Suor Orsola Benincasa of Naples, the Italian Institute for Philosophical Studies. Both his life and his art have been greatly influenced by his intellectual exchanges with Hermann Nitsch, Peter Kubelka, Antonio Gargano, Buz Barclay, Jonas Mekas and Bernard Heidsieck. Likewise, his decade of work in the Historical Archives of the Institute of the Banco of Naples Foundation yielded numerous works, the most important of which is his volume prefaced by Ernst H. Gombrich, The Pleasures of Boredom: Four Centuries of Doodles in the Historical Archives of the Bank of Naples. (Note: The preface was later reprinted in Gombrich's The uses of images: studies in the social function of art and visual communication.)

In 1998, the antique yacht Halloween became his home, laboratory and oratorio, inspiring his poem Prisoner of Freedom, which was translated into Japanese by Moto Hashiramoto. The book was presented at the Twelfth Congress of the Society for the Philosophy of Language (Piano di Sorrento, October 2005) as the first symmetrical book in the tradition of the illustrated poem. In 2003 Zevola created an installation in the Certosa of Padula entitled The Rule and the Exception: The All Too Human Cry of Giordano Bruno Responds to the Contemplative Silence of San Bruno, which is still on view. In 2004 he founded the publishing house Position Plotting Book which publishes in editions of 500 without a copyright the works of various international authors with translations in numerous languages. Recitations of these works have been the occasion for several performances around the world (Kyoto, Tokyo, Moscow, Vilnius, Vienna, Berlin, Budapest, Paris, Naples, Rome and New York City). In 2005 Zevola was the chief assistant to Hermann Nitsch in his 122nd Aktion al Burgtheater of Vienna, thus celebrating their more than thirty-year intellectual and artistic friendship.

The Sacred Forest of Bomarzo, an ancient place of inspiration, has now taken the place of Zevola’s yacht Halloween. There, he has launched new projects such as Art Real Estate: Center for the Free Circulation of People and Ideas Across the Planet. Among his most recent installations and exhibitions are Naples Calls New York: Mystic Teresa (Anthology Film Archives, November 2005, New York), Naples Calls Kyoto: 33 Photocollages for a Book (University of Art and Design, Kyoto, October 2005), Works and Days: The Rule (Certosa di San Lorenzo, Padula, June 2003), and currently Prince Antonio de Curtis Calls Daedalus: First Experiment of the Cosmographic Imagination (Kaplan’s Project, Palazzo Spinelli, Naples).
