= Enrico Ruta =

Italian philosopher, sociologist, and translator

Enrico Ruta (1869–1939) was an Italian philosopher, sociologist and translator.

== Life ==
Enrico Ruta lived mainly in Naples where he was a close friend of Benedetto Croce and where in 1930 he became a professor at the Higher Institute of Economics and Commerce.

Ruta wrote novels and essays in political science and social sciences. He also translated the texts of Friedrich Nietzsche and Heinrich von Treitschke. He has collaborated with the daily Neapolitan Il Mattino. During the 1930s, he developed a political theory that harmonized with the fascist regime.

== Works ==
=== Narrative ===
- The taste of love, 1895. (New ed. Millennium, 2006)
- Insaniapoli, 1911. (New ed. Editions Campus, 1999)
- The secret of Partenope, Naples, 1924. (New ed. Millennium, 2003)

=== Essays ===
- Visions of the East and West: essays in the history of science and poetry, in 1894 and 1924.
- The social psyche. Milan-Palermo-Naples, Sandron Publisher, 1909.
- The Return of genius about a new edition of the "New Science" by GB Vico. Bari, 1913.
- Politics and ideology. Milan, Corbaccio, 1929-2 st.
- The historical necessity of the new Italy, Naples 1931.

=== Translations ===
- Otto Braun, diary and letters / translation and preparation of ER Bari, 1923.
- Friedrich Nietzsche, The Birth of Tragedy, or Hellenism and pessimism / translation and preface by ER Bari, 1919.
- Heinrich von Treitschke, France by the first empire to 1871 / translated by ER Bari, 1916.
- Heinrich von Treitschke, policy / translation of ER Bari, 1916.
