= Giulio Sirenio =

Italian philosopher

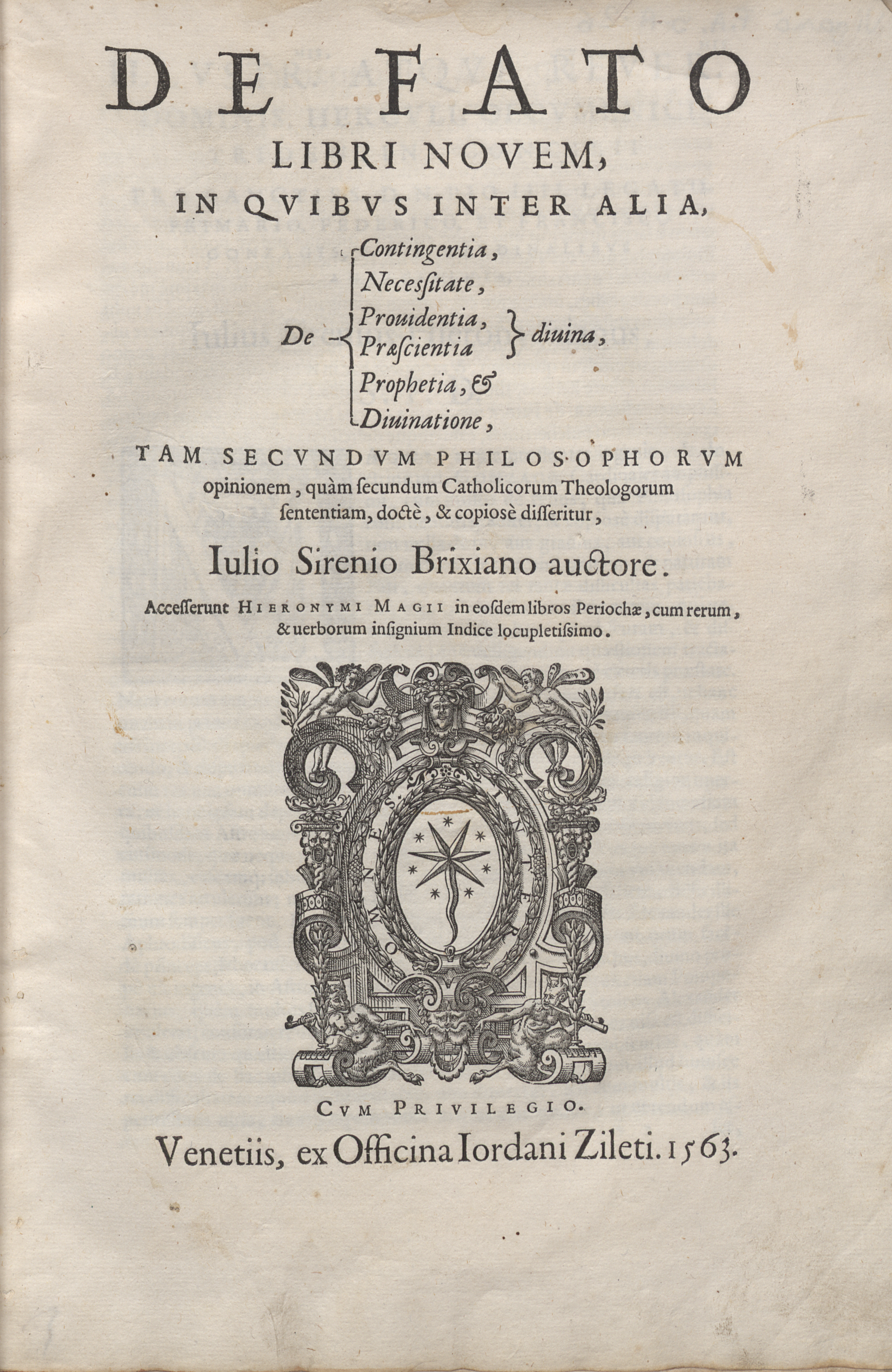
De fato, title page (1563)

Giulio Sirenio (Latin: Julius Syrenius; 1553 – 1593) was an Italian philosopher from Brescia.

He was professor of theology and metaphysics at the University of Bologna.

== Works ==
- De fato (in Latin). Venice: Iordani Zileti. 1563.
- De unitate naturae angelicae (in Latin). Bologna: Societatem Typographiae Bonon. 1578.
- De praedestinatione compendium (in Latin). Venice: Dominici Guerraei. 1580.
- Promptuarium theologicum (in Latin). Bologna: Faustum Bonardum. 1580.
