= Mundrabilla (meteorite) =

Meteorite found in Western Australia

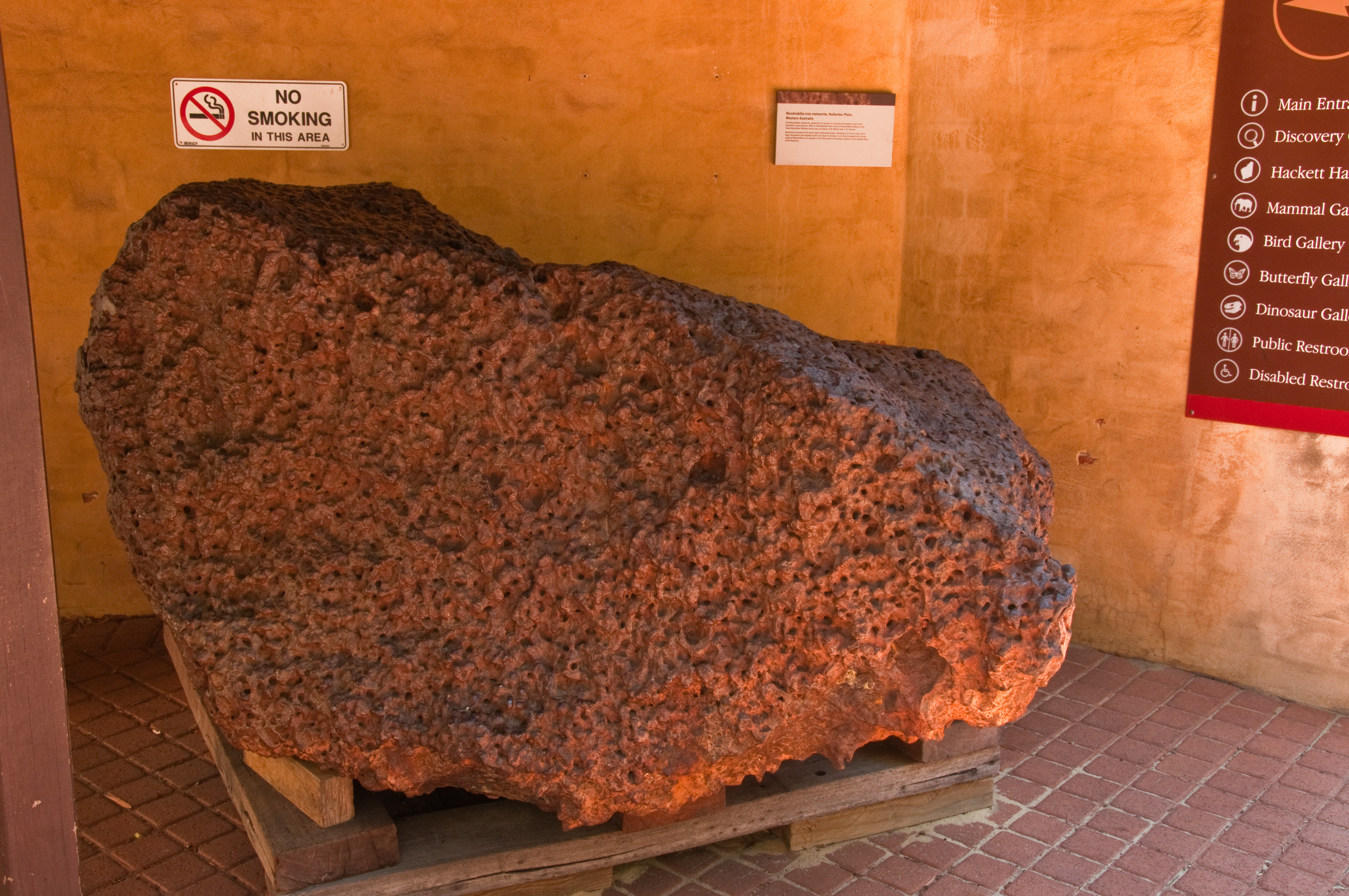
- Mundrabilla main mass
- Type: Iron
- Structural classification: Medium octahedrite
- Group: IAB
- Composition: 65-75% iron-nickel (7.8% Ni, 0.48% Co)
- Country: Australia
- Region: Western Australia
- Coordinates: 30°47′S 127°33′E
- Observed fall: >1 million years
- Found date: 1911
- TKW: 24 tonnes (24 long tons; 26 short tons)
- Related media on Wikimedia Commons

The Mundrabilla meteorite is an iron meteorite found in 1911 in Australia, one of the largest meteorites found, with a total known weight of 24 tonnes and the main mass (the single largest fragment) accounting for 12.4 tonnes.

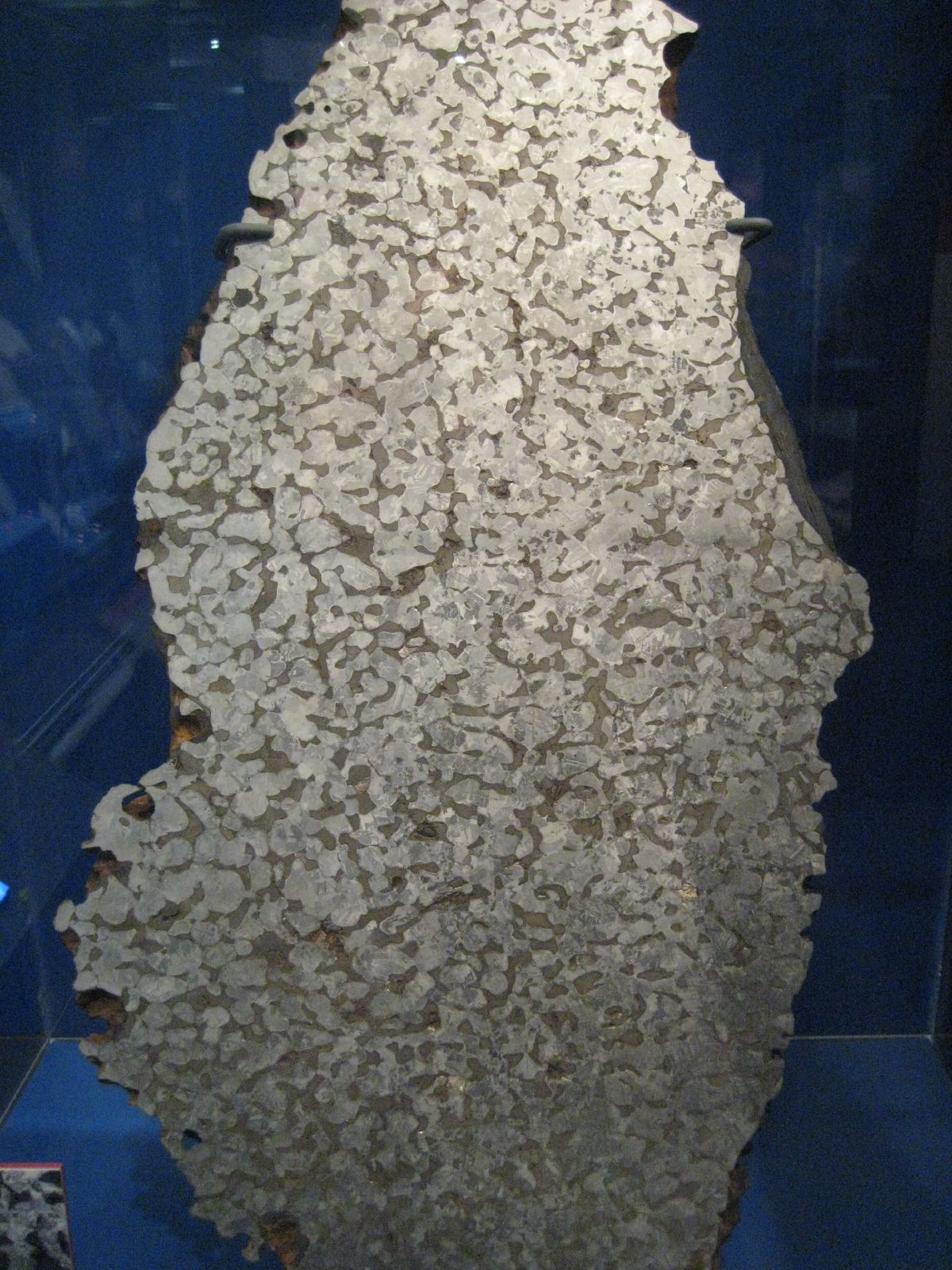
Slice of Mundrabilla II at National Museum of Natural History

== History ==
In 1911, an iron meteorite fragment of 112 g was found by Harry Kent, foreman in charge of camels for the Western Australian survey of the transcontinental railway route, at 31°1′S 127°23′E, on Premier Downs station on the Nullarbor Plain. The small meteorite was called Premier Downs I. Later in 1911 Kent found another small iron meteorite (116 g) about 13 kilometres (8.1 mi) west from the found location of Premier Downs I, named Premier Downs II. Both meteorites were medium octahedrites, believed to be part of the same fall.

In 1918, a third similar small iron meteorite of 99 g was found in the area by A. Ewing, named Premier Downs III.

In 1962, a small iron meteorite of 108 g with similar characteristics was found near Loongana by a rabbit trapper named Harrison. It was suggested as a possible pairing with the previous Premier Downs samples.

In 1965, three small iron fragments (94.1 g, 45 g, 38.8 g) were found by Bill Crowle of the Geological Survey of Western Australia 16 kilometres (9.9 mi) north of Mundrabilla Siding on the Trans Australian Railway at 30°45′S 127°30′E.

In April 1966, two very large iron masses of 12.4 tonnes and 5.44 tonnes were found in the Nullarbor Plain at 30°47′S 127°33′E by geologists R.B. Wilson and A.M. Cooney during a geological survey. The two masses were lying 180 metres (590 ft) apart, in clayey soil within slight depressions. The masses were surrounded by a large number of small iron fragments. The meteorites were named Mundrabilla, while the largest fragment, the eleventh largest found in the world as of 2013, is distinguished as Mundrabilla I. Mundrabilla II, the smaller of the two large Mundrabilla masses, found to weigh 6.1 tonnes, was shipped to Germany for cutting.

In 1967, a small iron fragment of 66.5 g found at 30°57′S 126°58′E by Harry Butler, was named Loongana Station West.

Two additional masses weighing 840 and 800 kg, designated Mundrabilla No. 3 and No. 4, respectively, were found by Carlisle in 1979 at a location 20 km east of the find-site of the two large Mundrabilla masses.

Perth Observatory has a 189 kg piece found in 1983, and list a 300 kg piece at The Gravity Discovery Centre in Gingin.

It has been suggested that the Mundrabilla meteorites are closely related to the Loongana Station and Premier Downs meteorites, and were shed from the same mass during atmospheric ablation.

Mundrabilla I, the main mass of 12.4 tonnes, is now conserved at the Western Australia Museum.

Another piece of the Mundrabilla meteorite, weighed at approximately 3.5 tons, was recovered in 1988. It was taken by train from Loongana to Perth where it was studied at the Western Australia Museum. It is now on display at the Museum of the Great Southern in Albany, Western Australia.

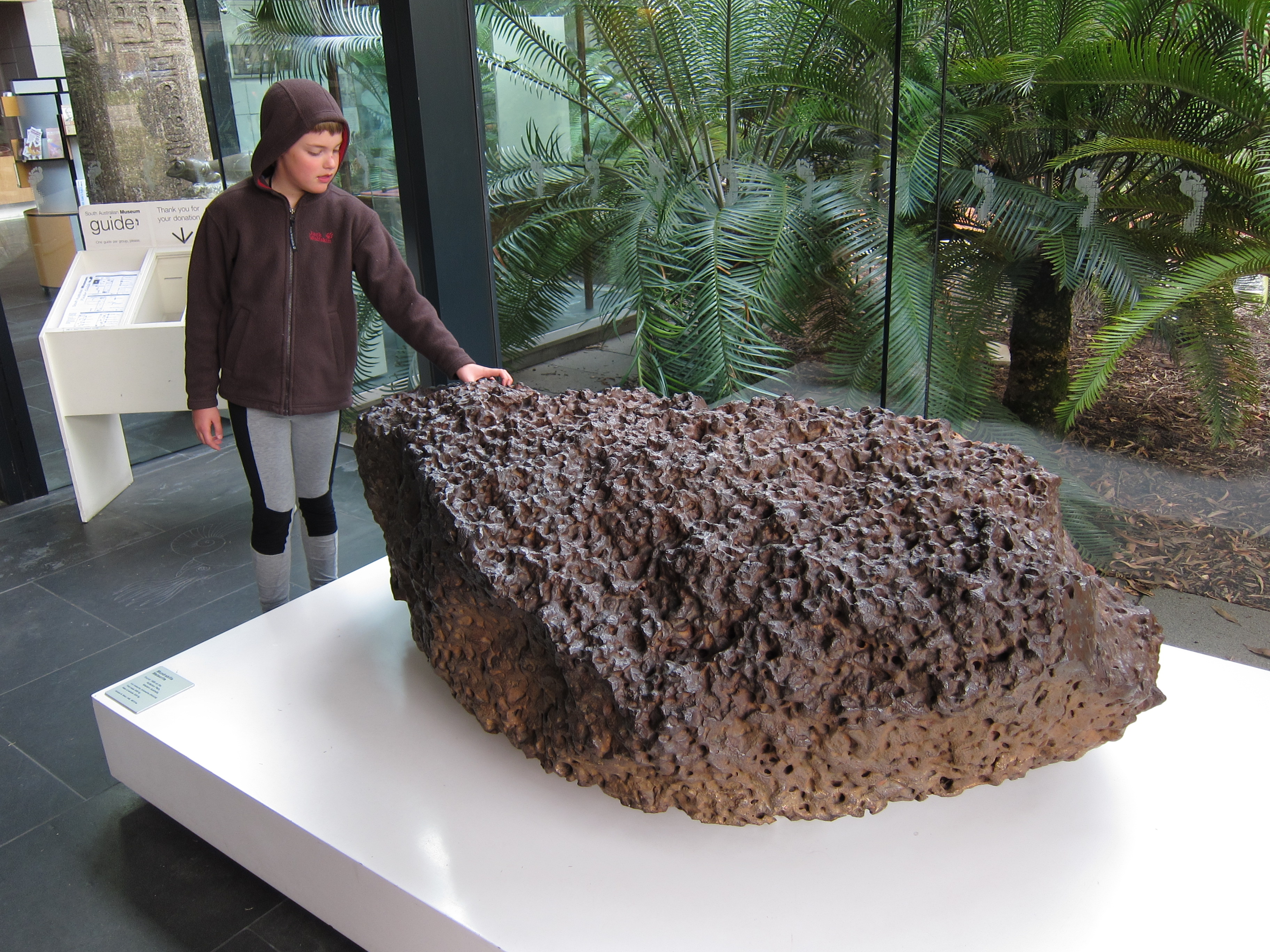
A 2.5 tonnes piece of Mundrabilla II in the foyer of South Australian Museum.

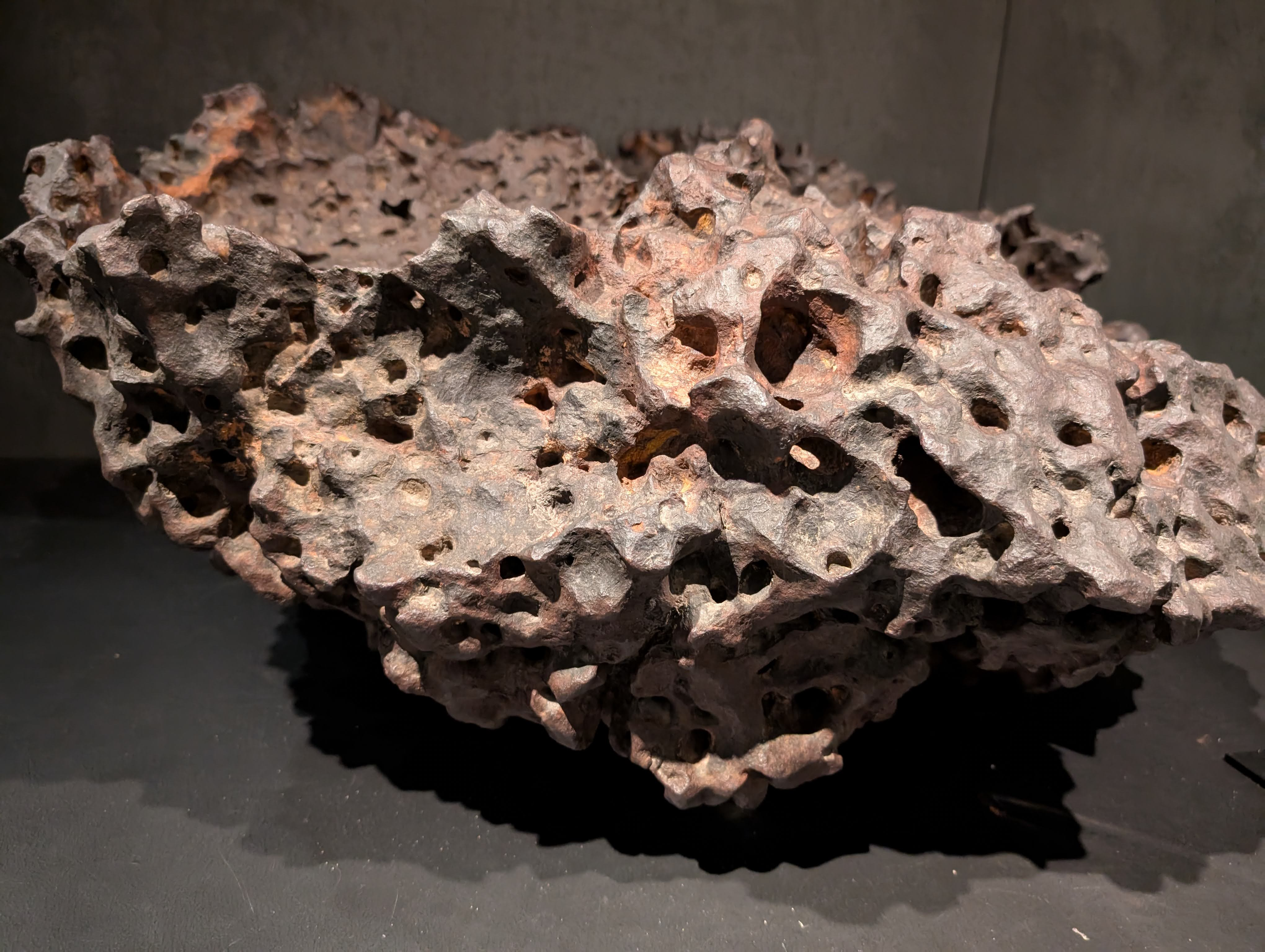
Mundrabilla meteorite, Australian Museum, Sydney. Fragment found in the 1970s, 617 kg

== Composition ==
The meteorite is 65-75% iron-nickel, including 35% by volume of troilite (iron sulphide), with inclusions of schreibersite, graphite and silicates, mainly olivine, pyroxene and potassium-rich plagioclase.

== Classification ==
Mundrabilla is classified as part of the IAB group. The IAB group is often viewed as complex of many different groups. In this complex, Mundrabilla, Waterville, and Buffalo Gap form the "Mundrabilla trio" or "Mundrabilla grouplet" (a group of meteorites with less than 5 members). If two more meteorites with similar properties would be found they could form another group within the IAB complex.

== Superconductivity ==
In March 2018, it was reported that evidence of tiny traces of low temperature superconductivity was found in the 12.4-tonne (27-thousand-pound) main mass of the Mundrabilla meteorite. The superconductor appeared to be an alloy of indium, tin and possibly lead.
