= Guido del Giudice =

Italian philosopher and writer (born 1957)

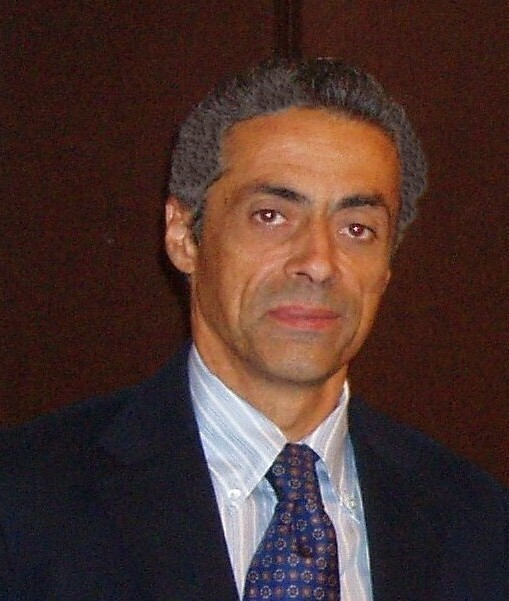
Guido del Giudice

Guido del Giudice (born August 14, 1957) is an Italian philosopher and writer.He is one of the most influential experts on life and works of the philosopher Giordano Bruno.

== Biography ==
Del Giudice was born in Naples, Italy, where he still lives. He obtained a degree in medicine from the University of Naples Federico II in 1982, but he continued to cultivate his literary and philosophical studies, becoming a leading expert on the philosopher Giordano Bruno. He has written several works about Bruno and translated his texts.

Members of the scientific advisory board of Nicolas Benzin Stiftung, Frankfurt am Main.

In 2008 he received from the International Academy Partenopea Federico II, the first International Giordano Bruno Award for his book La disputa di Cambrai, in the category "best work dedicated to the philosopher". In a review in the journal Bruniana & Campanelliana in 2008, Filippo Mignini has pointed out the remarkable similarities between Del Giudice's translation and that of Barbara Amato in a doctoral thesis of 2006.

Guido del Giudice demonstrated in a detailed reply, the originality of his translation and the falsity of the arguments put forward by Mignini to justify the failed attempt to appropriate the work of one of his students.

== Works ==
- "WWW. Giordano Bruno" (2001), Marotta & Cafiero, Naples;
- "The coincidence of opposites: Giordano Bruno between East and West" (2005) Di Renzo Editore, Rome. Expanded second edition with the essay "Bruno, Rabelais and Apollonius of Tiana." (2006) Di Renzo Editore, Rome;
- "Two Orations: Oratio valedictoria e Oratio consolatoria". (2006) Di Renzo Editore, Rome;
- "The dispute in Cambrai: Camoeracensis acrotismus". (2008) Di Renzo Editore, Rome;
- "The god of geometricians – four dialogues". (2009) Di Renzo Editore, Rome;
- "Summa of metaphysical terms", with the essay: "Giordano Bruno in Switzerland between alchemists and Rosicrucians". (2010) Di Renzo Editore, Rome;
- "I'll say the truth. Interview with Giordano Bruno". (2012) Di Renzo Editore, Rome.
- "Giordano Bruno. Against the mathematicians". (2014) Di Renzo Editore, Rome.
- "Giordano Bruno. The prophet of the infinite universe". (2015) Amazon.
- "Giordano Bruno. Latin epistles". (2017) Fondazione Mario Luzi, Rome.
- "Giordano Bruno. Scintille d'infinito". (2020) Di Renzo Editore, Rome.
- "Giordano Bruno. Candelaio". (2022) Di Renzo Editore, Rome.
