= Francesco Bonatelli =

Italian philosopher (1830-1911)

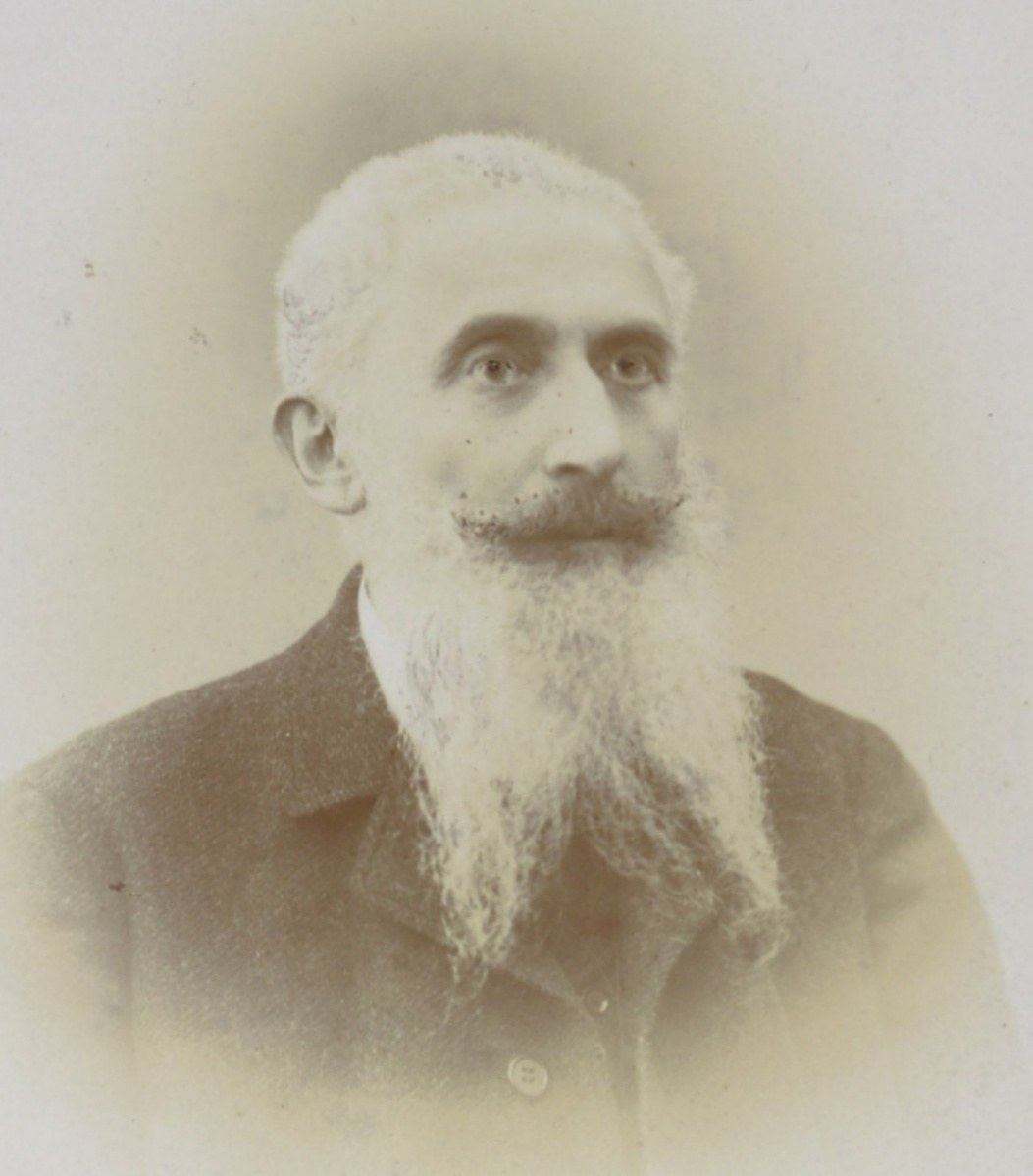
Portrait of Francesco Bonatelli

Francesco Bonatelli (1830-1911) was an Italian philosopher of the Roman Catholic spiritualist tradition.

== Biography ==
Francesco Bonatelli was born in Iseo, Brescia, Italy on 25 April 1830. He first studied philosophy at the University of Vienna and later taught that subject at the universities of Bologna (1861–1867) and Padua (1867–1911). He was also one of the principal editors of Filosofia delle scuole italiane, a review founded in 1870 by Terenzio Mamiani which was dedicated to defending a Platonizing position. However, he resigned in 1874 when the Platonist Giovanni Maria Bertini published criticisms of Catholicism that Bonatelli considered too bold. He was responsible for the introduction the analytic method of German psychologists Johann Friedrich Herbart and Rudolf Hermann Lotze into Italy.

Bonatelli theorised on the nature of consciousness, trying to explain consciousness' capacity for free action while nevertheless being involved with mechanical and logical necessities. He placed Man at the center of his philosophical thought and defended Idealism against the philosophies of Positivism and Materialism that were growing in popularity in the 19th century.

He was a member of the Italian societies Accademia Nazionale dei Lincei and Accademia Galileiana di Scienze, Lettere ed Arti.

Bonatelli's grandson was the famous Italian philosopher Bernardino Varisco.

Bonatelli died in Padua, Italy on 13 May 1911.

== Works ==
Among his works are:

- Pensiero e conoscenza (1864)
- Coscienza e meccanismo interiore (1872)
- Discussioni gnoseologiche e note critiche (1885)
- Elementi di psicologia e logica per i licei (1892)
- Percezione e pensiero (vol. 1: 1892; vol. 2: 1894; vol. 3: 1895)
- Intorno alla conoscibilità dell'io (1902)
- Studi d'epistemologia (1905)
