= Federico Ferrari (philosopher) =

Italian philosopher and art critic

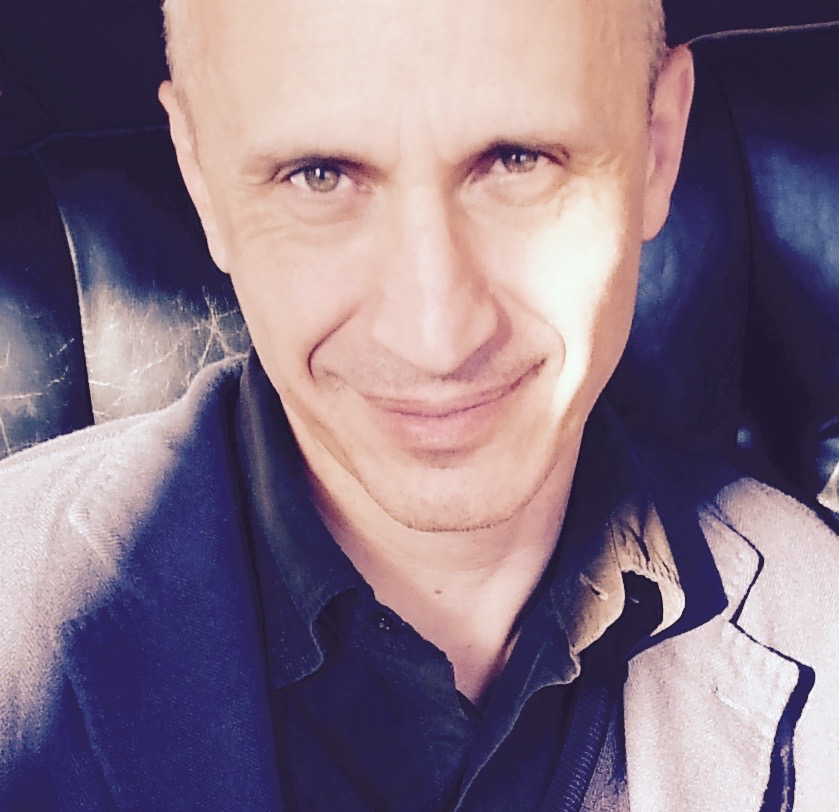
- Born: 15 September 1969 (age 56); Milan, Italy

Philosophical work
- Era: Contemporary philosophy
- Region: Western philosophy
- School: Continental philosophy
- Main interests: Aesthetics
- Notable ideas: Arte essenziale

Federico Ferrari (born 15 September 1969) is an Italian philosopher and art critic. He teaches Philosophy of Art at Brera Academy, in Milan, Italy.

== Career ==
Under the influence of Maurice Blanchot and Jean-Luc Nancy he has published many essays on philosophy, as well as literature. He has written two books with Jean-Luc Nancy: the first on the subject of the nude, the second on the iconography of the writer. More recently, he has focused on the ontological state of the image, the deconstruction of the museum in postmodernity, and the question of art and/or in time. In 2011 he theorized the aesthetics of "Arte Essenziale", which manifested itself in the show held at Collezione Maramotti (Reggio Emilia, Italy) and at Frankfurter Kunstverein (Germany). Eugenio Viola writes of Ferrari, "In a time when many continue to lament what they see as the inexorable decline of theory’s role in criticism, "Arte essenziale" (Essential Art), curated by philosopher Federico Ferrari, does its part to placate concerns with an exploration of the ties that link artistic practice and philosophical speculation. The show focuses on the Wesen, or essence, of a work of art—a notion that has always been inextricably linked with a search for the new."

His works address quite diverse questions concerning the problems of bioethics and euthanasia, the political theory of community under the influence of the works of Maurice Blanchot, Jean-Luc Nancy, and Giorgio Agamben, the status of the museum in the postmodern era, and the question of art in relation to time.

Subsequently, following the reflection of Maurice Blanchot and Jean-Luc Nancy, he initially undertook research into the problem of a social bond precariously balanced between communal experience and the atomized societies of the globalized world. He then developed a collaboration with Jean-Luc Nancy, which led, between 2000 and 2021, to the co-writing of four works: Nus sommes. La peau des images (We Are Naked. The Skin of Images), Iconographie de l'auteur (Iconography of the Author), La fin des fins (The End of Ends), and Extase (Ecstasy).

Starting from the late 1990s, his research field increasingly focused on the themes of the image and art, notably with a deconstructive approach to the museum institution (Lo spazio critico - The Critical Space) and the system of art and image production (Il re è nudo - The Emperor is Naked). The entirety of his work appears to aim at creating foci that, while not fully succeeding in eradicating the weeds of capitalism, exhibit signs of lively 'aristocratic' and 'anarchic' contestation. Where aristocracy means awareness, responsibility, freedom, sharing, an ethic of doing, the project (future?) of art. And anarchy, for its part, real contestation (critical and theoretical), an indispensable voice on the destiny of a world to be reconquered and, gradually, decontaminated. The methodological approach thus seems to combine aspects of deconstruction with elements of the anarcho-individualist tradition, in an attempt to denounce and subvert the mystifying production processes of late capitalism. More specifically, the reflection on the image seems to be configured, as Marco Belpoliti wrote, "as a long reflection on the gaze, on that particular type of gaze that we can define as 'heuristic': one that wants to go beyond the manifest visibility of things to reach the hidden visibility."

In his writings L'Anarca (The Anarchist) and Oscillazioni (Oscillations), the aristocratic element – with certain anachoretic aspects – seems to radicalize in a direct confrontation with nihilistic thought and its postmodern masks, pushing, on the one hand, towards an exile from the present in search of an absolute principle or anti-principle (the influence of the figure of Cristina Campo, explicitly mentioned by the author in an interview, is evident in this respect) and, on the other hand, towards an autobiographical thought whose clarity borders on violence and whose violence has an imperious disregard for compromises, a tension towards the absolute. In this way, the Italian thinker, while taking up themes addressed by Heidegger and Jünger, indeed being "in tune with what Jünger asserts, seems to transcend the 'humanist' boundaries proper to the German's worldview. He becomes the bearer of the essential need to rethink nothingness without falling into Eastern mysticism, placing himself on the path inaugurated by Klages and a few others (among whom, in the Italian context, Andrea Emo can be counted, whose legacy Ferrari, in certain respects, seems to take up).

== Bibliography ==
- La comunità errante. Bataille e l’esperienza comunitaria, Milano, Lanfranchi, 1997 ISBN 978-88-363-0066-2
- Nudità. Per una critica silenziosa, Milano, Lanfranchi, 1999 ISBN 978-88-363-0068-6
- Wolfgang Laib, Venezia, West Zone 1999
- Nus sommes. La peau des images, with Jean-Luc Nancy, Paris, Klincksieck 2002 (Torino, Bollati Boringhieri, 2003; Berlin-Zűrich, Diaphanes 2006). Trans. Anne O'Byrne and Carlie Anglemire as "Being Nude The Skin of Images", New York, Fordham University Press, (2014) ISBN 9780823256204
- Lo spazio critico. Note per una decostruzione dell’istituzione museale, Roma, Sossella, 2004 (with Johannes Cladders, Rosalind Krauss, Federico Nicolao, Hans Ulrich Obrist, Giulio Paolini, Claudio Parmiggiani, Harald Szeemann) ISBN 978-88-87995-82-4
- La convocazione, with Tomas Maia e Federico Nicolao, Genova, Chorus, 2006
- Costellazioni. Saggi sull'immagine, il tempo e la memoria, Milano, Lanfranchi, 2006 ISBN 978-88-363-0075-4
- Iconographie dell'auteur, with Jean-Luc Nancy, Paris, Galilée 2005 (Roma, Sossella, 2006; Tokyo, Chikuma Shobo 2008) ISBN 978-88-89829-11-0
- Del contemporaneo. Saggi su arte e tempo, with Jean-Luc Nancy, Georges Didi-Huberman, Nathalie Heinich, Jean-Christophe Bailly, Milano 2007, Pearson Paravia Bruno Mondadori
- Sub specie aeternitatis. Arte ed etica, Reggio Emilia, Diabasis, 2008 ISBN 978-88-8103-524-3
- Il re è nudo. Aristocrazia e anarchia dell'arte, Roma, Sossella, 2011 ISBN 978-88-89829-94-3
- Arte essenziale, Milano, Silvana, 2011 ISBN 978-88-3662-055-5
- L'insieme vuoto. Per una pragmatica dell'immagine, Milano, Johan & Levi, 2013 ISBN 9788860100924
- L'anarca, Milano, Mimesis, 2014 ISBN 9788857526898
- La fin des fins. Scène en deux actes, with Jean-Luc Nancy, Nantes, Éditions Cécile Defaut, 2015 ISBN 9782350183664
- Visioni. Scritti sull'arte, Milano, Lanfranchi, 2016 ISBN 978-8836300815
- Oscillazioni. Frammenti di un'autobiografia, Milano, SE, 2016 ISBN 9788867232116
- Il silenzio dell'arte, Roma, Sossella, 2021 ISBN 978-8832231939
- Estasi, con Jean-Luc Nancy, Roma, Sossella, 2022 ISBN 979-1259980120
- L'antinomia critica, Roma, Sossella, 2023 ISBN 979-1259980540

== Video lectures ==
- Ferrari, Federico. Arte essenziale. Collezione Maramotti. 2011. (Italian)
