= Giambattista Toderini =

Italian writer and philosopher

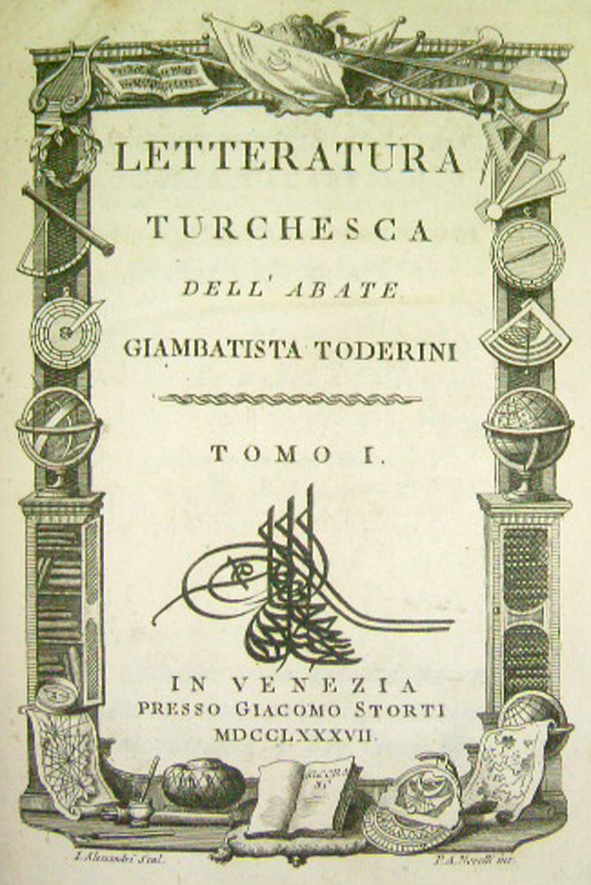
Title page of his book Letteratura turchesca

Giambattista Toderini (Venice, 1728 – Venice, 4 July 1799) was a Venetian philosopher, writer, and former Jesuit abbot.

== Biography ==
Son of Domenico Maria and Anna Maria Cestari, he was the descendant of the Gagliardis dalla Volta counts palatine. Toderini studied philosophy and archaeology, but tended toward contemplative and religious life since his youth and joined the Society of Jesus. He was employed in teaching, dedicating himself to philosophy in Verona and Forlì.

After the suppression of the Jesuits, Toderini lost his position, and in October 1781 he joined the entourage of the Venetian ambassador to Constantinople, Agostino Garzoni. Toderini remained there, living in the ambassador's house, until May 1786, studying Ottoman Turkish literature and collecting books and manuscripts in Arabic and other languages. There, he wrote his three volume Letteratura Turchesa ("Turkish Literature"), the first European survey of Turkish literature, published in Venice the year after his return by Giacomo Storti. This work was soon translated into French and German.

Toderini criticized slavery and colonialism, writing "You should ask the Negroes, bought like pitiful cattle to the dishonour of humanity, labouring at the caves of the [silver mines of] Potosi, and in Peru, losing their strength and life, what advantage they drew from the luxuries of Europe." His work sought to impress upon Europeans the degree to which Muslims had pursued science and knowledge, contrary to European perceptions at the time. Beyond his pioneering work on Turkish literature, Toderini's other works included religious tracts, a dissertation on marine lightning conductors, and other topics.

== Works ==
- Sull'induramento di molti bachi da seta.
- Sull'Aurora Boreale, Modena, 1770.
- Filosofia Frankliniana delle punte persevatrici del fulmine, Modena, 1771.
- La Constatiniana apparizione della Croce, contra al protestante G. Alberto Fabrzio, Venice, 1773.
- Della letteratura turchesca, Venice, 1787, 3 vols. (re-issued in 2008, Frankfurt, Institute for the History of Arabic-Islamic Science).
- L'onesto uomo ovvero saggi di morale filosofia dai principii della ragione, Venice, 1780.
- Nuove osservazione sopra il camaleone di Smyrna.
- Sull'andamento de' quadrupeli.
- Supra due antichissimi Alcorane ed alcune monete cufique, Padua, 1810.

== Bibliography ==
Sources

- AA.VV. Biographie universelle, Brussels, H. Ode, 1847.
- Basilio Sebastián Castellanos de Losada. Biografía eclesiástica completa, Madrid: Alejandro Gómez Fuentenebro, 1867.
- Gorton, J. A general biographical dictionary, London, 1851.
- Diario de Madrid, Vol. 5, Hilario Santos, includes July, August, and September 1787.
- Ubicini, J.H.A. El Tansimat: organización de la Turquía actual, Madrid: Impr. José Trujillo, 1854.

Additional bibliography

- Berkes, N. The development of secularism in Turkey, London: Hurst, 1998.
- Faroqhi, S.N. The Cambridge history of Turkey, Cambridge, 2006.
- Fetis, F.J. Complete treatise on the theory and practice of harmony, Pendragon Press, 2008.
- Gunny, A. Perceptions of Islam in European writings, Islamic Foundation, 2004.
- De Angelis, published the biography of Toderini in Vol. XLVI of the "Universal Biography" by Michaud.
- Petro, P. Venezia i turchi, G.C. Sansoni, 1975.
- Cavallini, Ivano. La musica turca nelle testimonianze dei viaggiatori e nella trattatistica del Sei-Settecento, Rivista italiana di musicologia 21/1 (1986), 144–169.
- Minuti, Rolando (2019). "TODERINI, Giambattista". Dizionario Biografico degli Italiani (in Italian). Vol. 95: Taranto–Togni. Rome: Istituto dell'Enciclopedia Italiana. ISBN 978-88-12-00032-6.
