= Appiano Buonafede =

Italian priest and philosopher

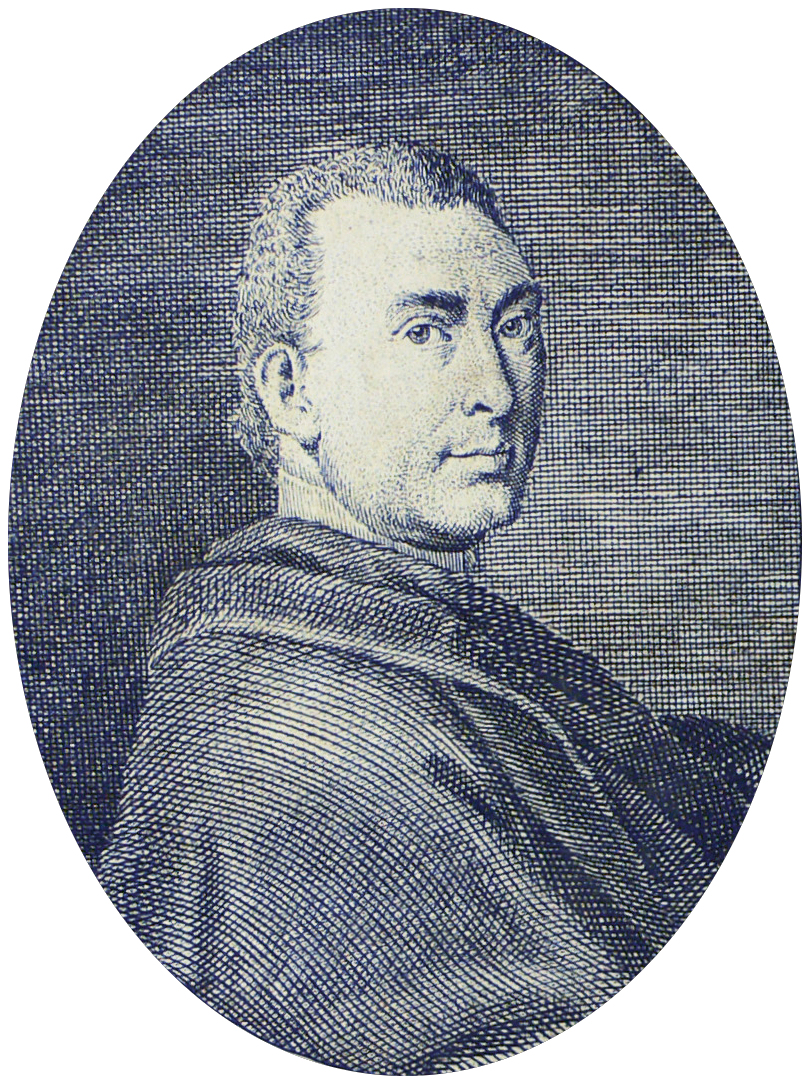
- Born: 1716; Comacchio, Papal States
- Died: 1793 (aged 76–77); Rome, Papal States
- Other names: Agatopisto Cromaziano
- Movement: Catholic philosophy

Philosophical work
- Notable works: Poetic, Historical and Critical Portraits

Appiano Buonafede (1716–1793) was an Italian priest and philosopher who published under the name Agatopisto Cromaziano.

Appiano Buonafede was born in Comacchio, a Province of Ferrara, and died in Rome. He became a professor of theology while in Naples in 1740, and entering the religious body of the Celestines, rose to be general of the order in 1777.

His principal works are on the history of philosophy, though he also published a few poems and philosophic comedies. He was "certainly not an original historian, but nor was he a simple compiler." Most of his compilation was based on the works of Johann Jakob Brucker and Thomas Stanley. For example, his seven-volume Della istoria e della indole di ogni filosofia di Agatopisto Cromaziano (1766–1781) was heavily dependent on the works of Brucker.

== Biography ==
Born in 1716 into a patrician family, after attending his early schools in his native Comacchio, having been orphaned by his father, in order to continue his studies he entered the Celestines in 1734, changing his secular name of Tito Benvenuto to the religious name of Appiano. After attending the course of philosophy in Bologna, from 1737 he followed the next course of theology in Rome. Having completed his three of years of Roman studies, he was transferred to Naples as a preacher and teacher of theology.

In the Neapolitan city he published in 1745 Poetic, Historical and Critical Portraits, a work favorably received in the Neapolitan cultural circles frequented by Buonafede, in which critical judgments on some important exponents of modern thought (such as Niccolò Machiavelli and Baruch Spinoza) coexist with partial welcomes of others (René Descartes and John Locke), in a composite style between Baroque and Arcadian.

In 1749 he was appointed abbot of a monastery in Apulia, later moving on to one in Bergamo and an abbey in Rimini. In 1754 Buonafede entered the Pontifical Academy of Arcadia, taking the name Agatopisto Cromaziano, under which he gave numerous works to print. In 1771, partly due to the benevolence with which the church hierarchies had received his writings, he was appointed procurator general of the congregation and transferred to Rome. Six years later, he became prefect general and, for reasons of his office, was obliged to reside in the abbey of Abbey of the Holy Spirit at Monte Morrone, Sulmona, near Sulmona. Buonafede, who in Rome had enjoyed the benevolence of Pope Clement XIV and that of the literary and Arcadian salons, was not comfortable in the isolation of his new residence. After his three-year term as prefect had elapsed, he again assumed the office of procurator general in 1780 before resigning in 1782.

In 1785 Pope Pius VI appointed him perpetual abbot of St. Eusebius, a position that, without requiring excessive care, ensured Buonafede those economic benefits that allowed him to quietly attend to his literary and philosophical works and to complete the work, dedicated to the same Pope, Of the Restoration of All Philosophy, which was particularly critical of modern thought that had wanted to make itself independent from the teaching of the Catholic Church.

He died in Rome, now infirm, at the age of seventy-seven in 1793.

== Works ==
- Saggio di commedie filosofiche con ampie annotazioni di A. Agatopisto Cromaziano (1754)
- Istoria critica e filosofica del suicidio ragionato di Agatopisto Cromaziano (1761)
- Delle conquiste celebri esaminate col naturale diritto delle genti (1763)
- Della istoria e della indole di ogni filosofia di Agatopisto Cromaziano, 7 vols., (1766–1781)
- Il genio borbonico, versi epici di Agatopisto Cromaziano nelle nozze auguste delle altezze reali di Ferdinando di Borbone... e di Maria Amalia... (1769)
- Della restaurazione di ogni filosofia ne' secoli, XVI., XVII., XVIII., 3 vols., (1785–1789) (German trans. by C. Heydenreich)
- Epistole tusculane di un solitario ad un uomo di città (1789)
- Storia critica del moderno diritto di natura e delle genti (1789)
