= Bondie Dietaiuti =

Bondie Dietaiuti was a 13th-century poet from Florence. He was influenced by the Occitan troubadours and known for his animal imagery, including a translation of lines about a lark from the troubadour song Can vei la lauzeta mover. In turn, he has been suggested to be an influence on Dante. Three of his canzoni and four of his sonnets survive. One of his sonnets was included in the Storia della letteratura italiana of Francesco de Sanctis.
