= Storia della letteratura italiana =

Essay by Francesco de Sanctis

Storia della letteratura italiana, volume 1, 1912 reprint (complete text)

The Storia della letteratura italiana (History of Italian Literature) is an essay written by Italian literary critic Francesco de Sanctis, published by Morano in two volumes in 1870 and 1871.

It is considered the first truly complete, organic treatment of Italian literature as a whole.

== Subdivision ==
The Storia della letteratura italiana consists of the following 20 chapters (the last two are somewhat shorter and less in-depth, due to pressure the publisher put on De Sanctis to complete the work):

- Volume I
  - I–II – Sicilian and Tuscan literature
  - III (Lirica di Dante) – poetry of Dante Alighieri
  - IV – 13th century poetry
  - V ("Mysteries and visions") – primitive chivalry literature and Holy Bible
  - VI – 14th century
  - VII (La Commedia) – Dante's influence
  - VIII – Petrarch's Il Canzoniere
  - IX – Giovanni Boccaccio's Decameron
  - X (Il trecentista) – Franco Sacchetti's work
  - XI (Le stanze) – 15th century (Leon Battista Alberti, Angelo Poliziano, Lorenzo il Magnifico, Luigi Pulci, Matteo Maria Boiardo, Giovanni Pontano)
  - XII – 16th century
- Volume II
  - XIII – Ludovico Ariosto's L'Orlando furioso
  - XIV – Teofilo Folengo
  - XV – Machiavelli and Francesco Guicciardini
  - XVI – Pietro Aretino
  - XVII – Torquato Tasso
  - XVIII – Giambattista Marino and the Academy of Arcadia
  - XIX (La nuova scienza) – Metastasio, Carlo Goldoni, Giuseppe Parini, Vittorio Alfieri, ugo Foscolo and Alessandro Manzoni
