= Pietro Paolo Parzanese =

Italian presbyter, poet and translator (1809–1852)

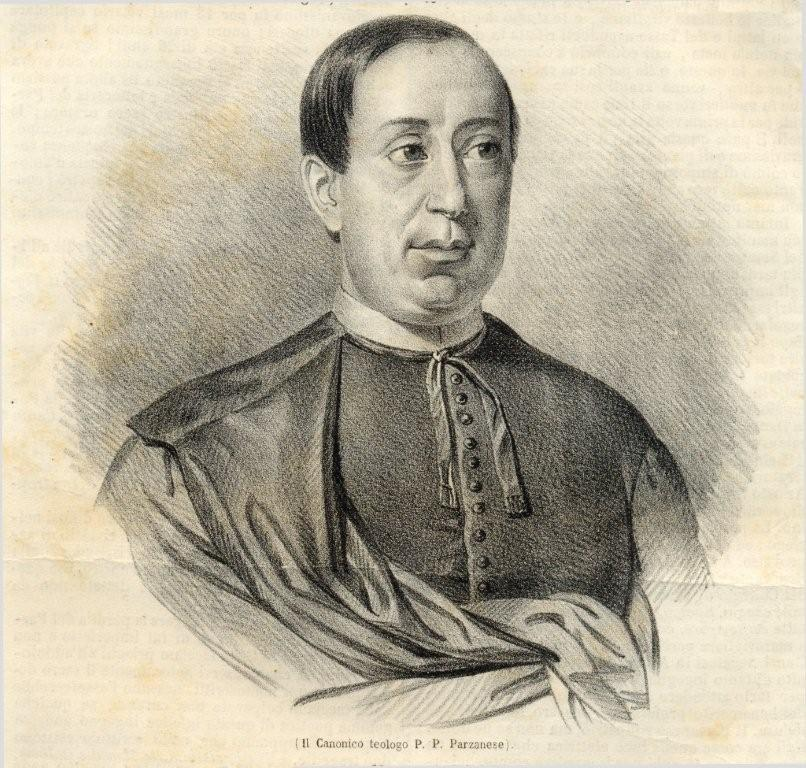
- Born: November 11, 1809 Ariano
- Died: August 29, 1852 (aged 42) Naples

Pietro Paolo Parzanese (November 11, 1809 – August 29, 1852) was an Italian presbyter, poet and translator.

Pietro Paolo Parzanese spent almost all his life in his hometown Ariano, where he worked as a priest and a literature and theology teacher in the local seminary. Although he often traveled to Naples, where he had contacts with the literary circles of the capital, and despite having also known of the German romantics, for his poetry, of personal imprint, Parzanese was accused of provincialism by Italian literary critic Francesco de Sanctis ("good and pious poet of the village"). According to Luigi Baldacci, the verses of Parzanese are above all the vehicle of a political ideology.
