= Lodovico Guicciardini =

Italian writer and merchant (1521–1589)

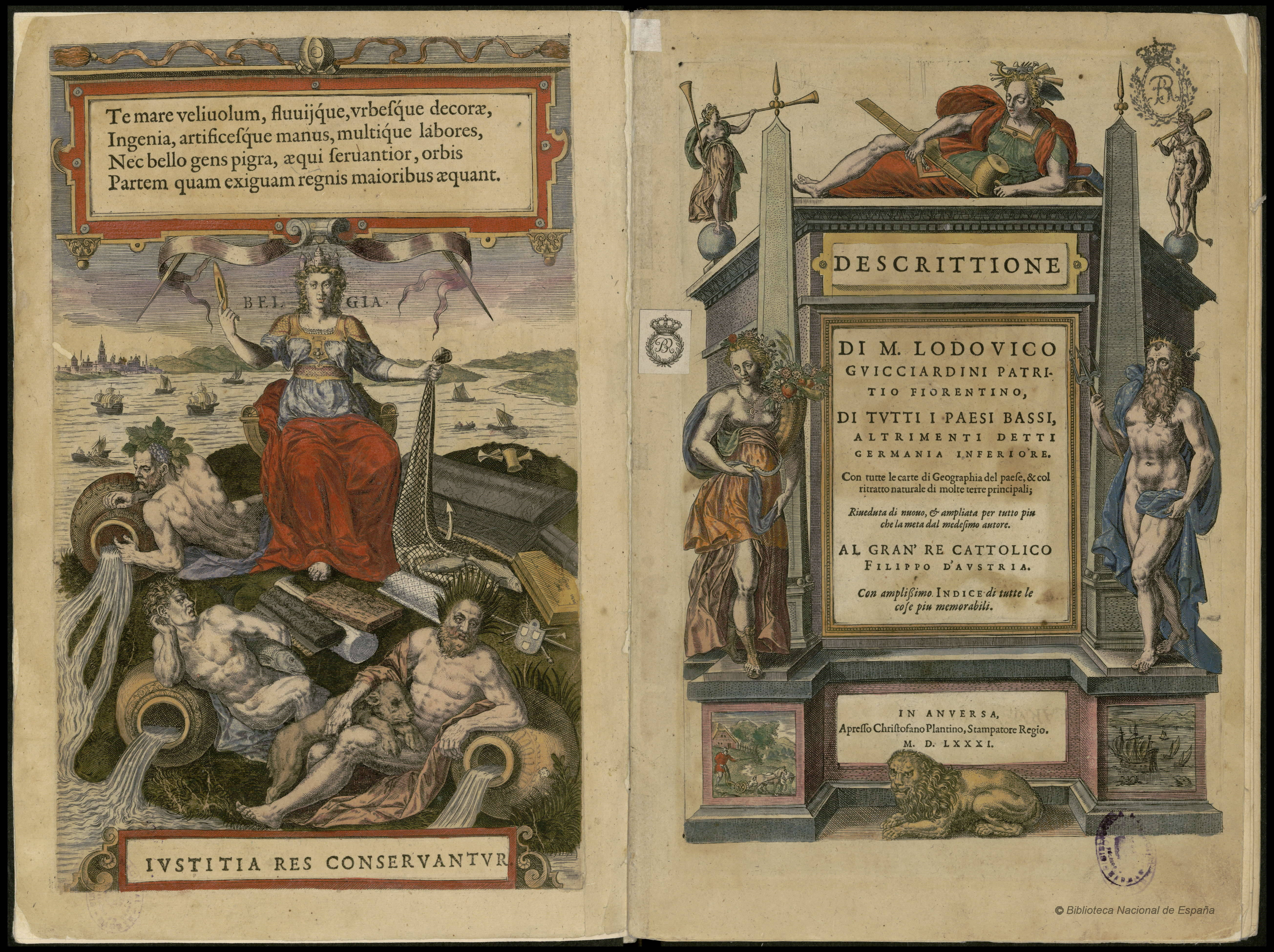
Frontispiece to Description of the Low Countries, 1567

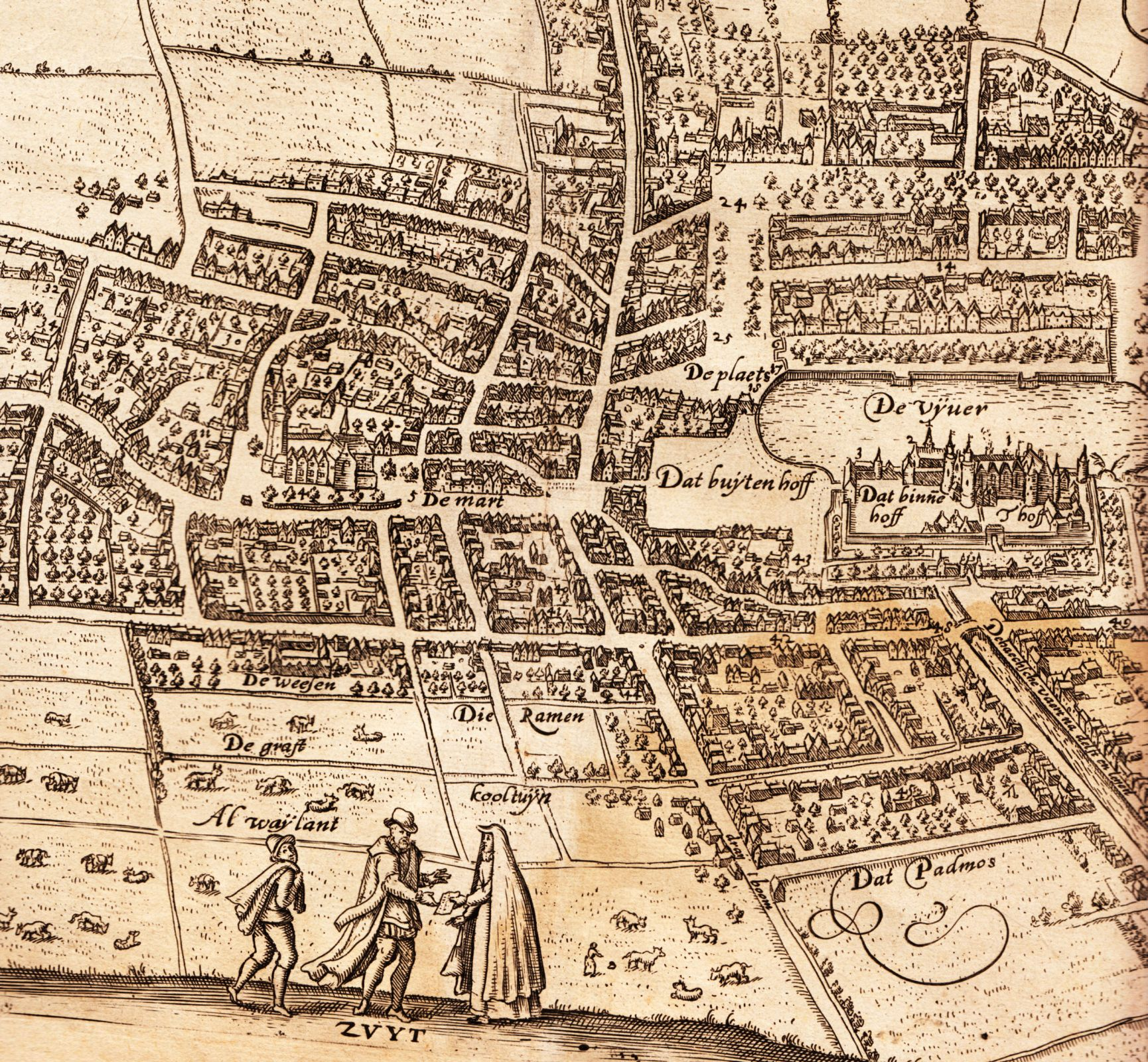
Map of the center of The Hague from Guicciardini's book

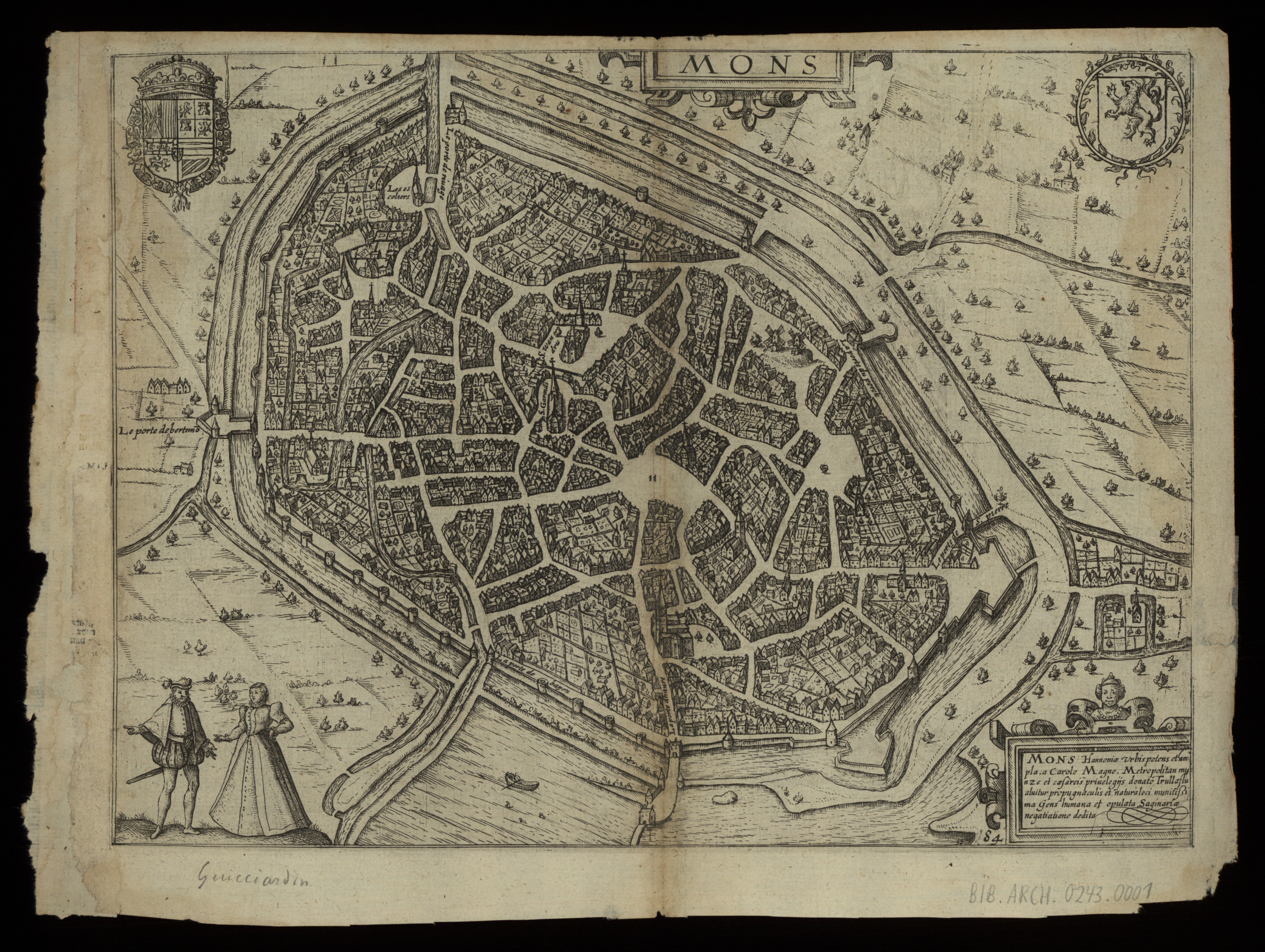
Map of Mons in the sixteenth century.

Lodovico Guicciardini (19 August 1521 – 22 March 1589) was an Italian writer and merchant from Florence who lived primarily in Antwerp from 1542 or earlier. He was the nephew of historian and diplomat Francesco Guicciardini.

== Description of the Low Countries ==
His best-known work, the Descrittione di Lodovico Guicciardini patritio fiorentino di tutti i Paesi Bassi altrimenti detti Germania inferiore (1567, Description of the Low Countries), was an influential account of the history and the arts of the Low Countries, accompanied by city maps by various leading engravers.

== Christophe Plantin and the "Descrittione" ==
From 1580 onwards, Christophe Plantin took over the production of the Descrittione from Willem Silvius. He improved the quality of the edition by using copper plates instead of woodblocks. In 1581, he published an Italian edition: Descrittione di M. Lodovico Guicciardini… In Anversa, Apresso Christofano Plantino, Stampatore Regio. M.D.LXXXI. This was followed in 1582 by an expanded French-language edition: Description de tout le Païs-Bas, … à Anvers, De l’Imprimerie de Christophle Plantin, M.D.LXXXII. In 1588, Plantin produced another Italian version: Descrittione… In Anversa, Apresso Christofano Plantino, Stampatore Regio. M.D.LXXXVIII.

== Death ==
Guicciardini died in Antwerp in 1589; he was buried there in the Cathedral of Our Lady.

== Gallery ==
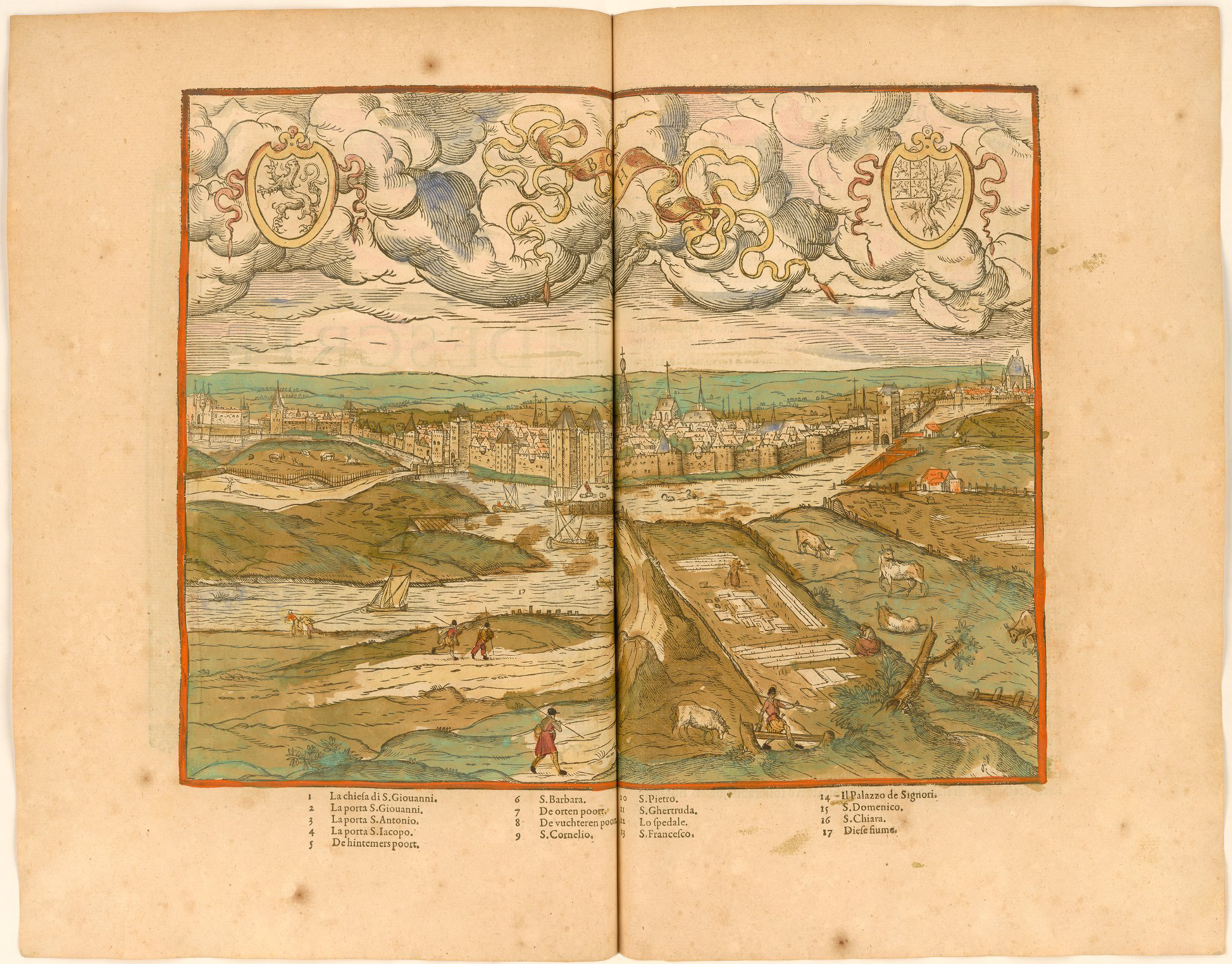

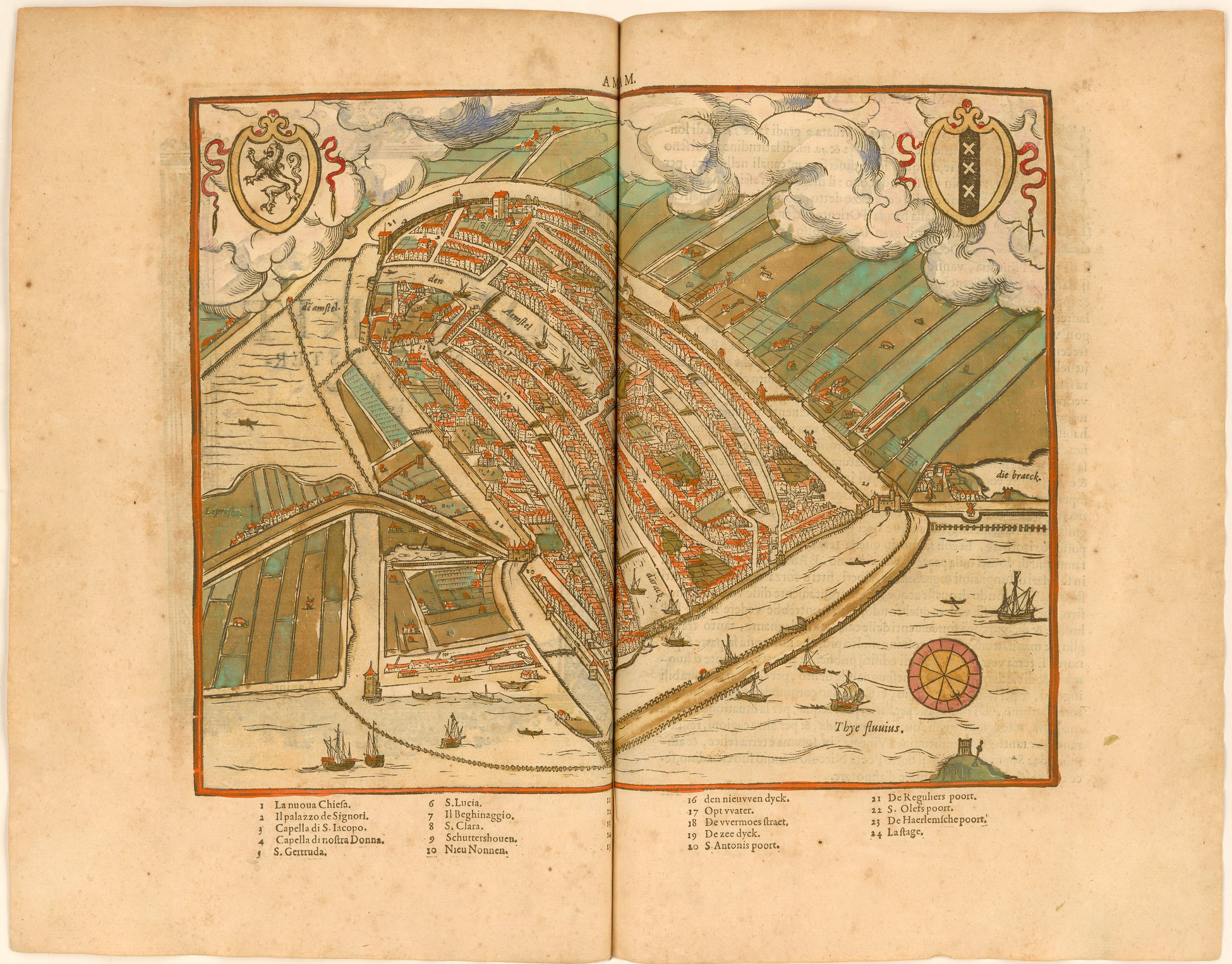

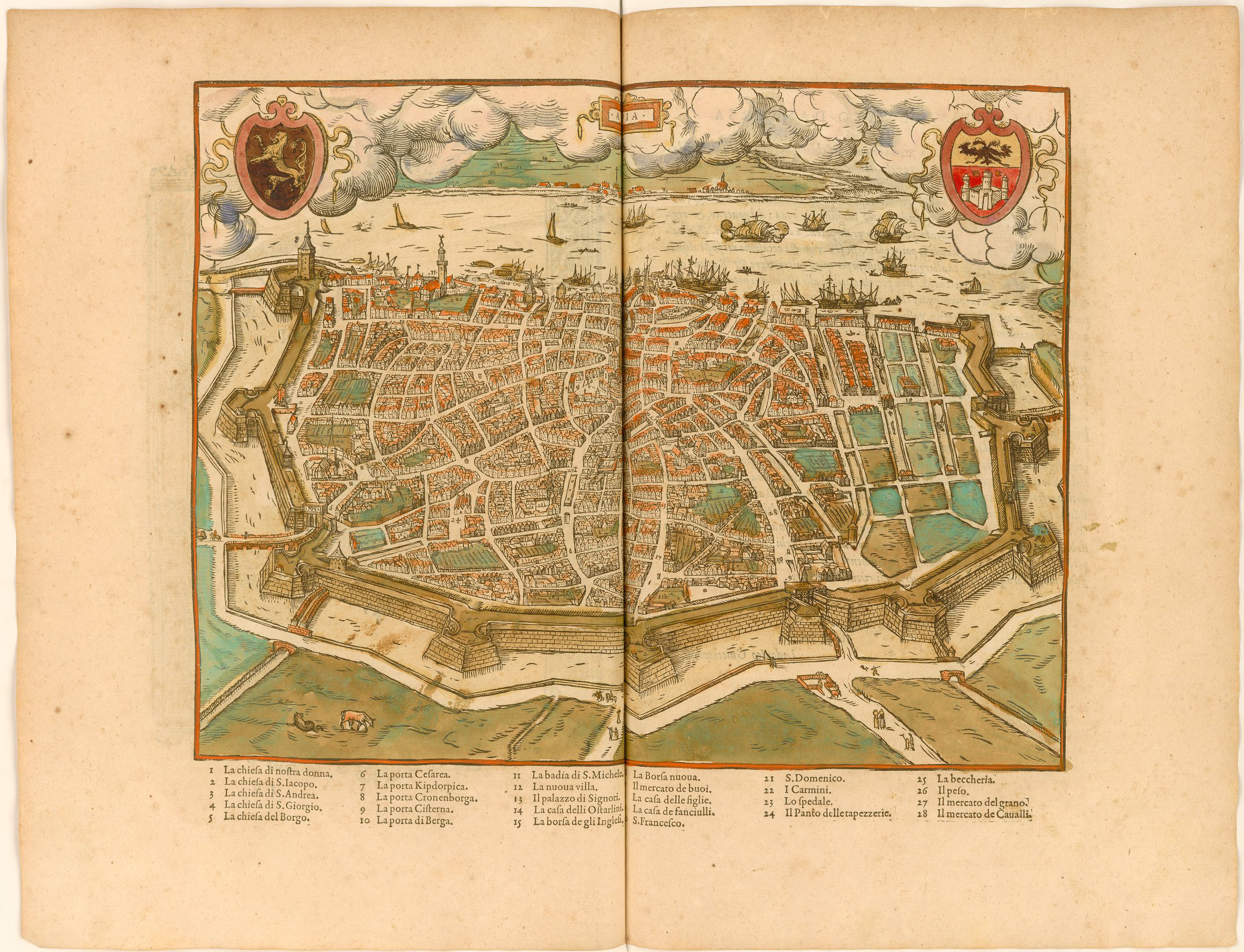

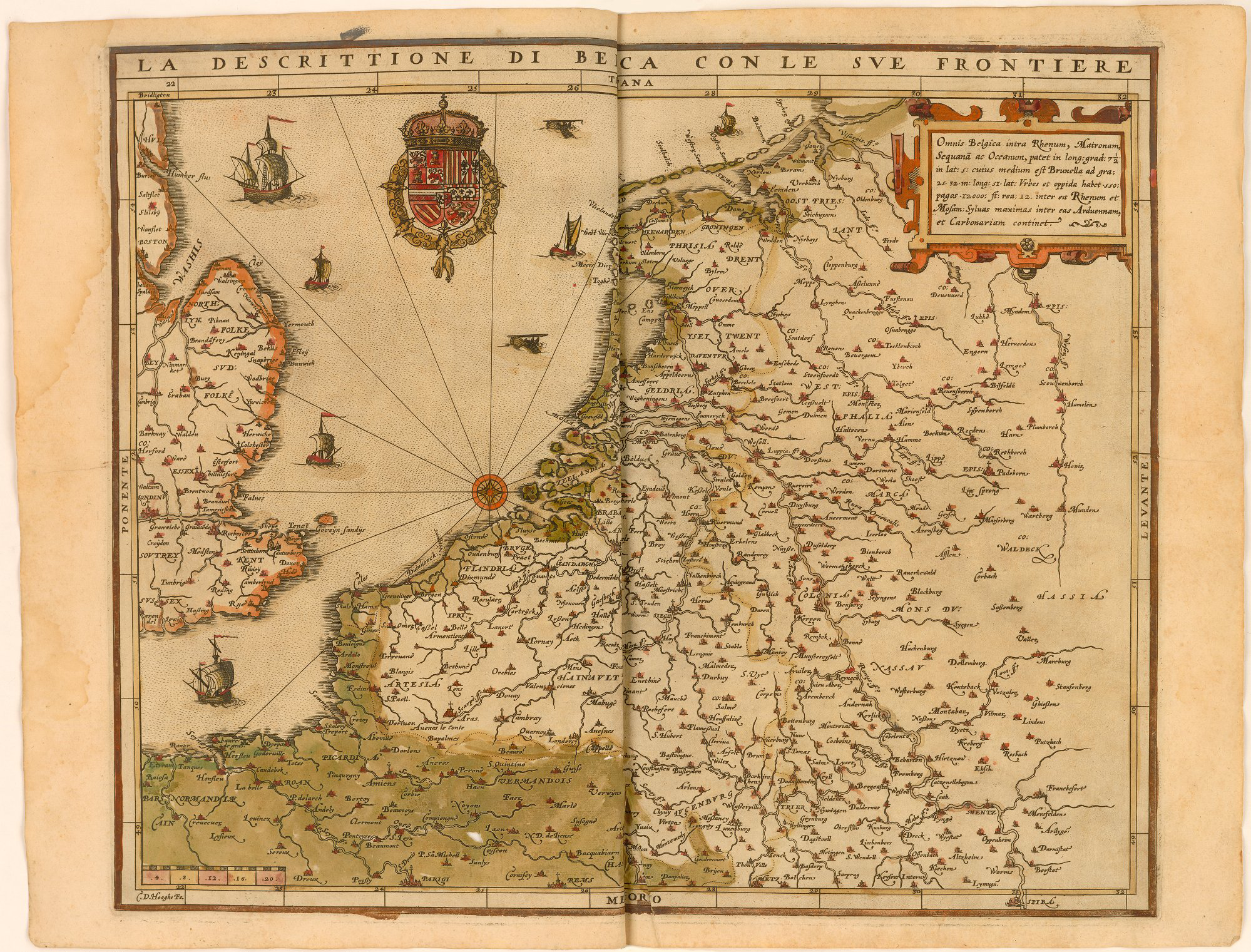

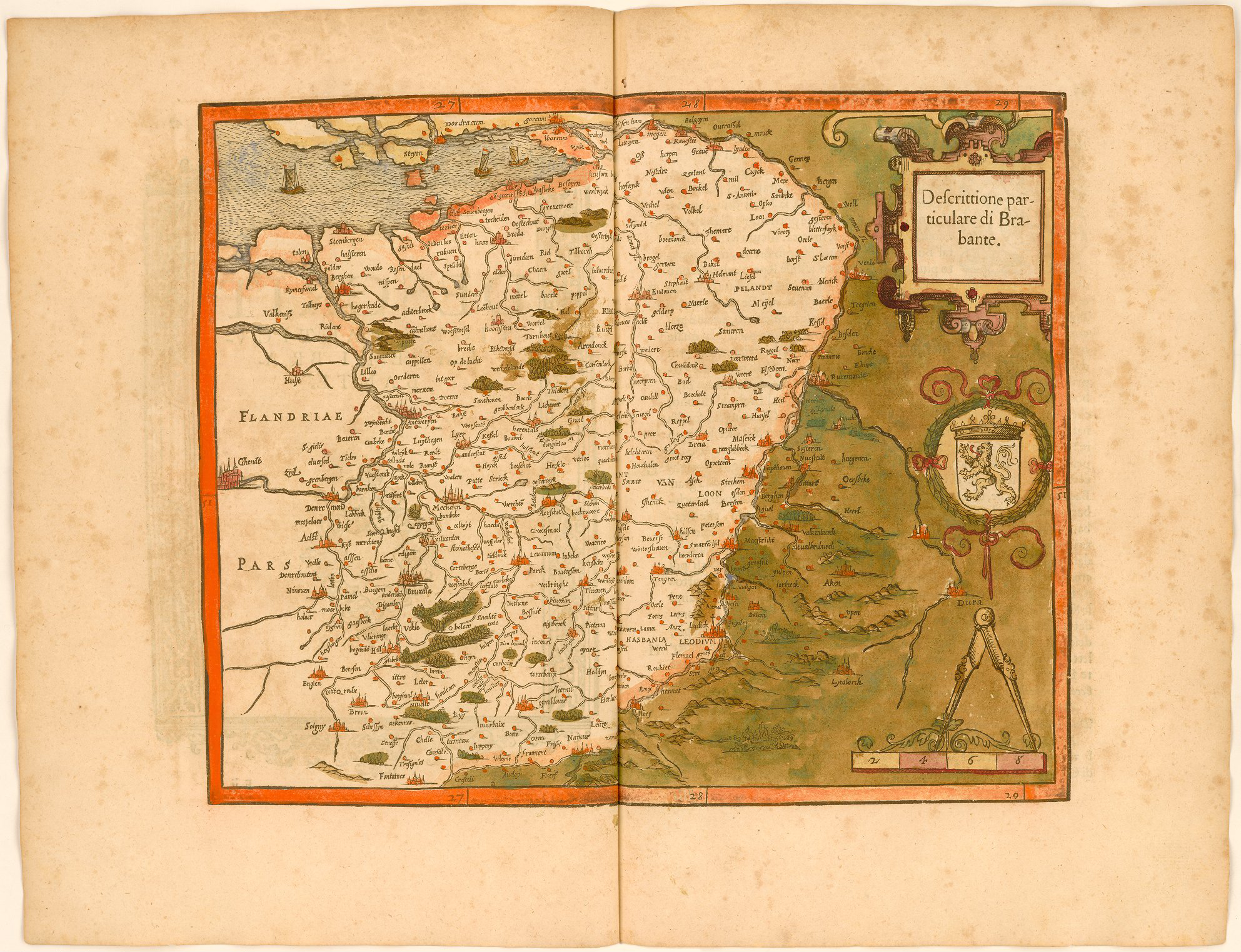

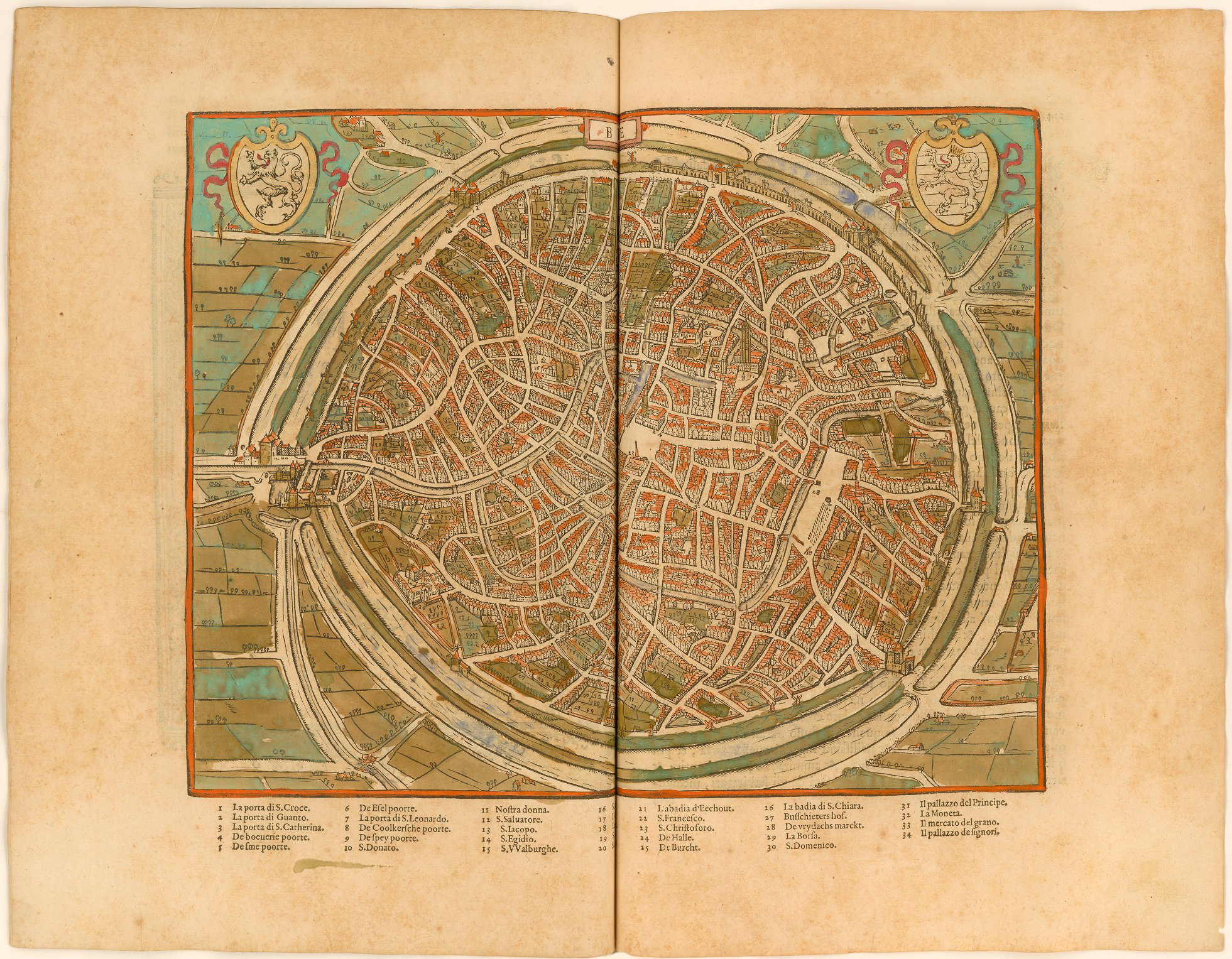

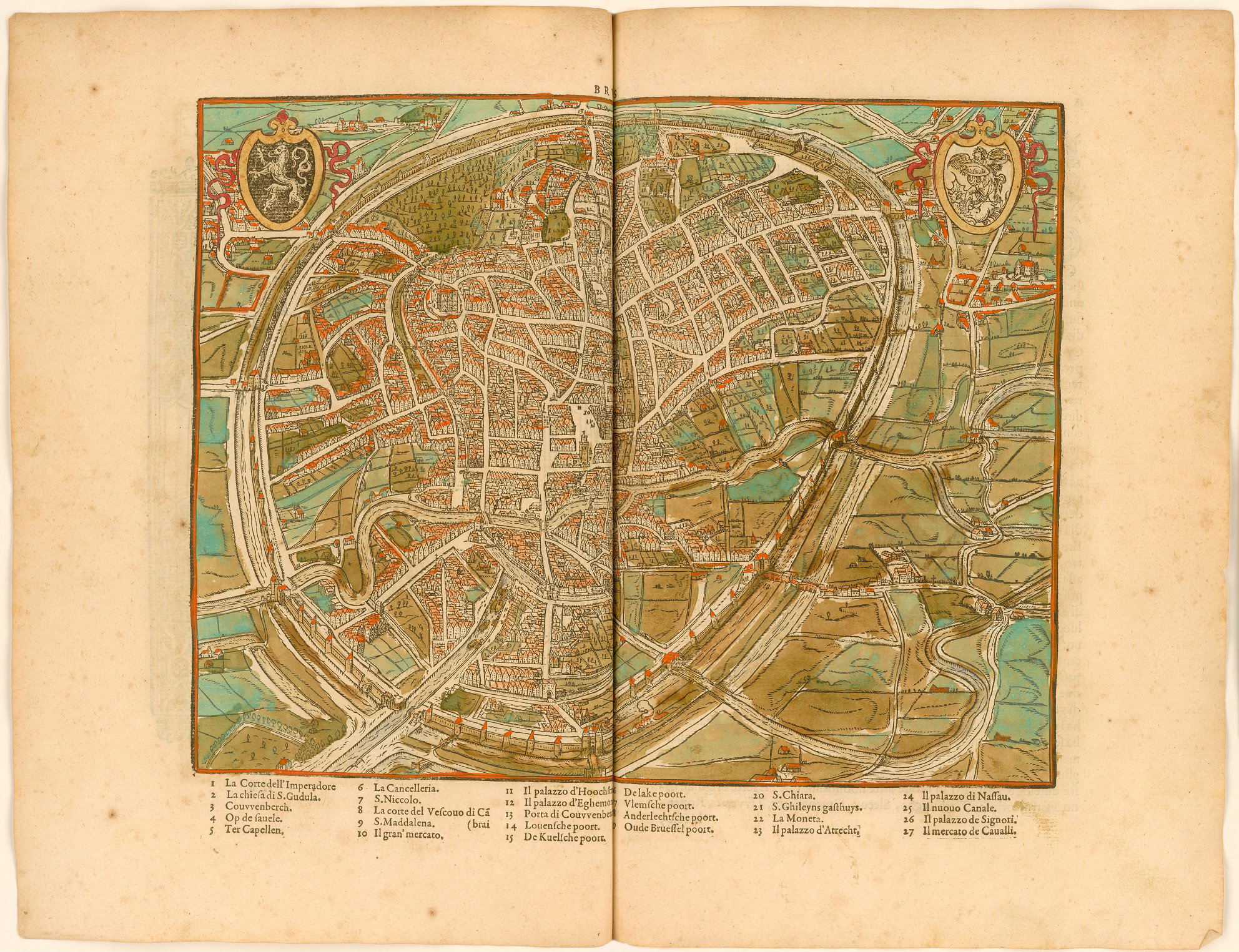

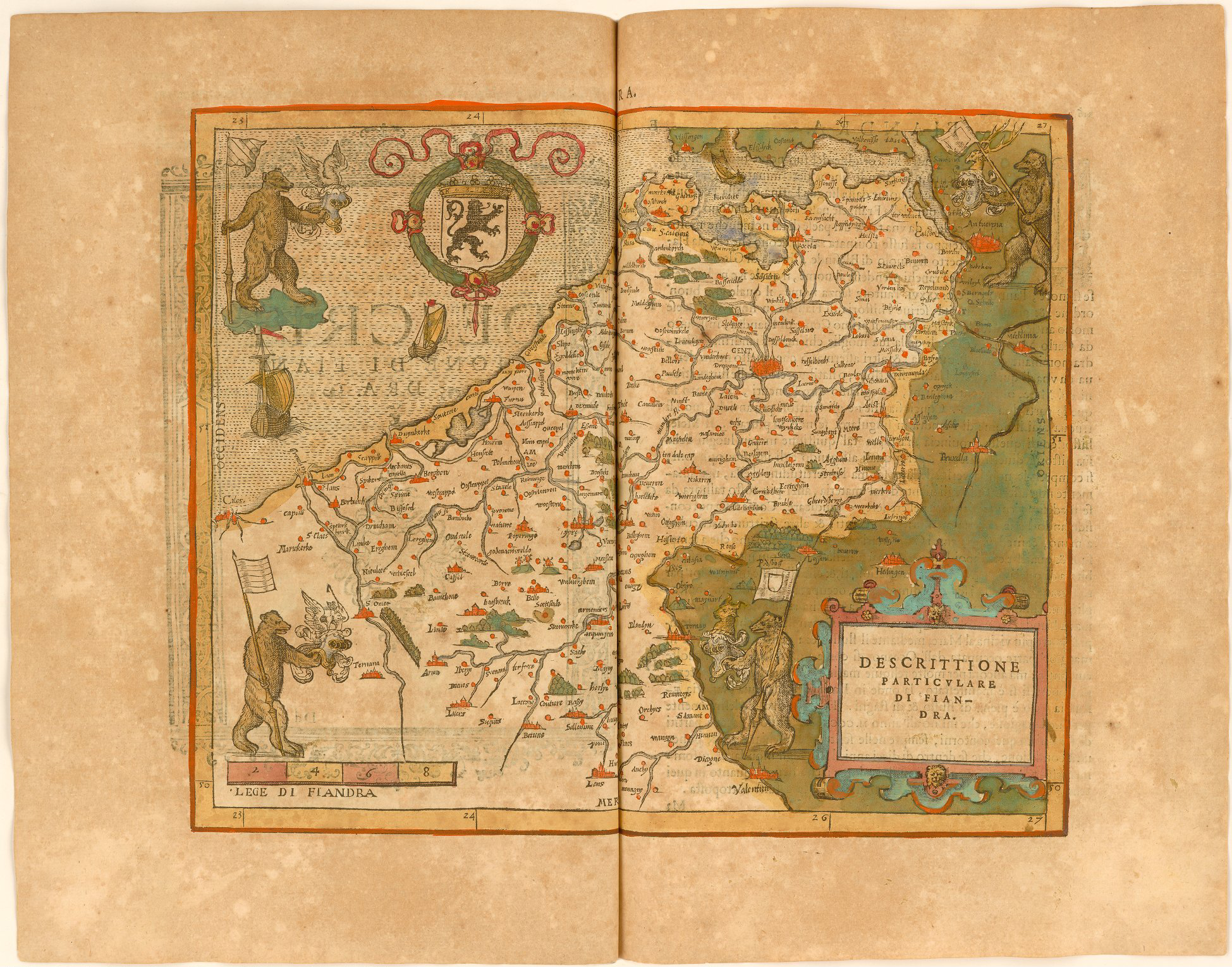

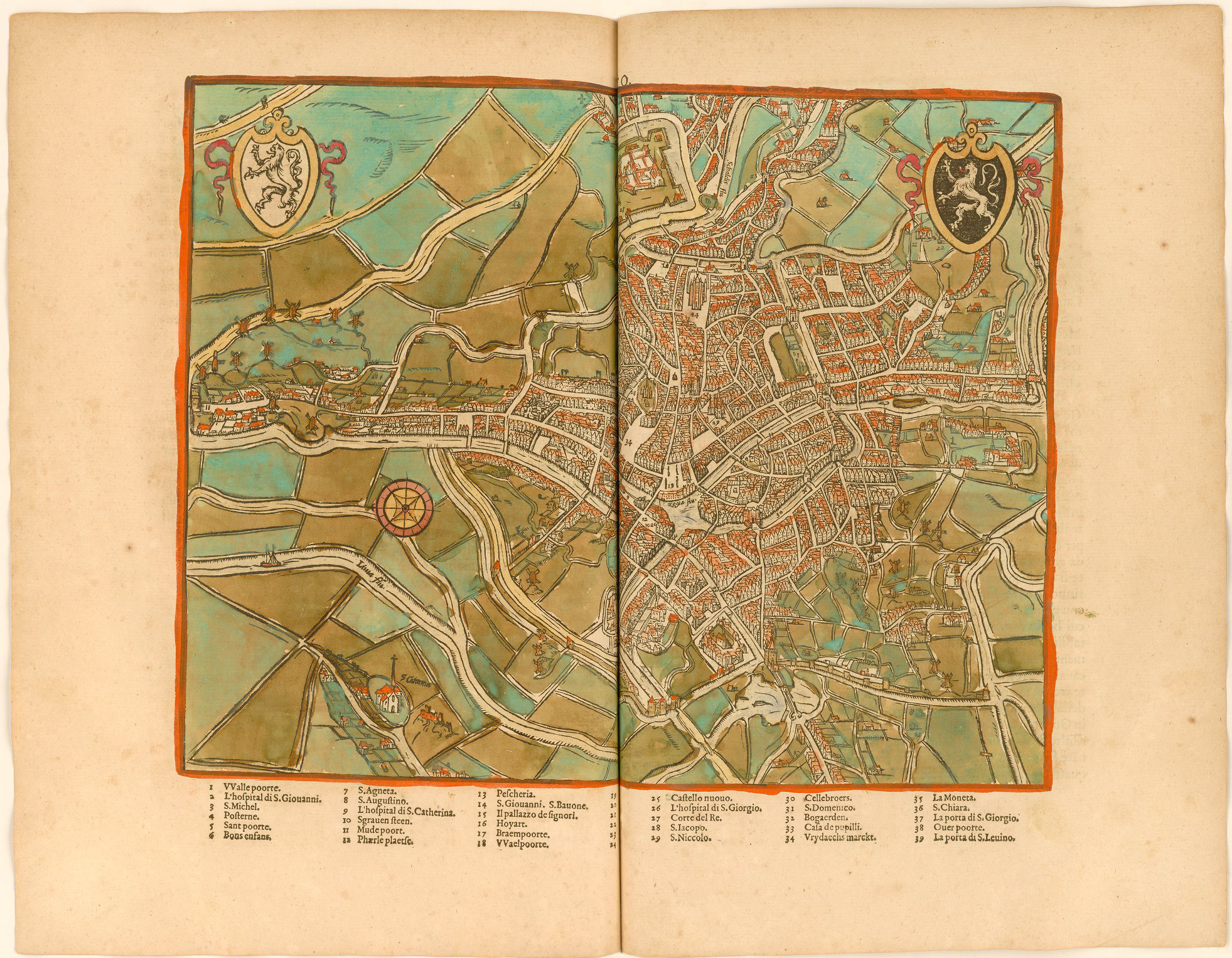

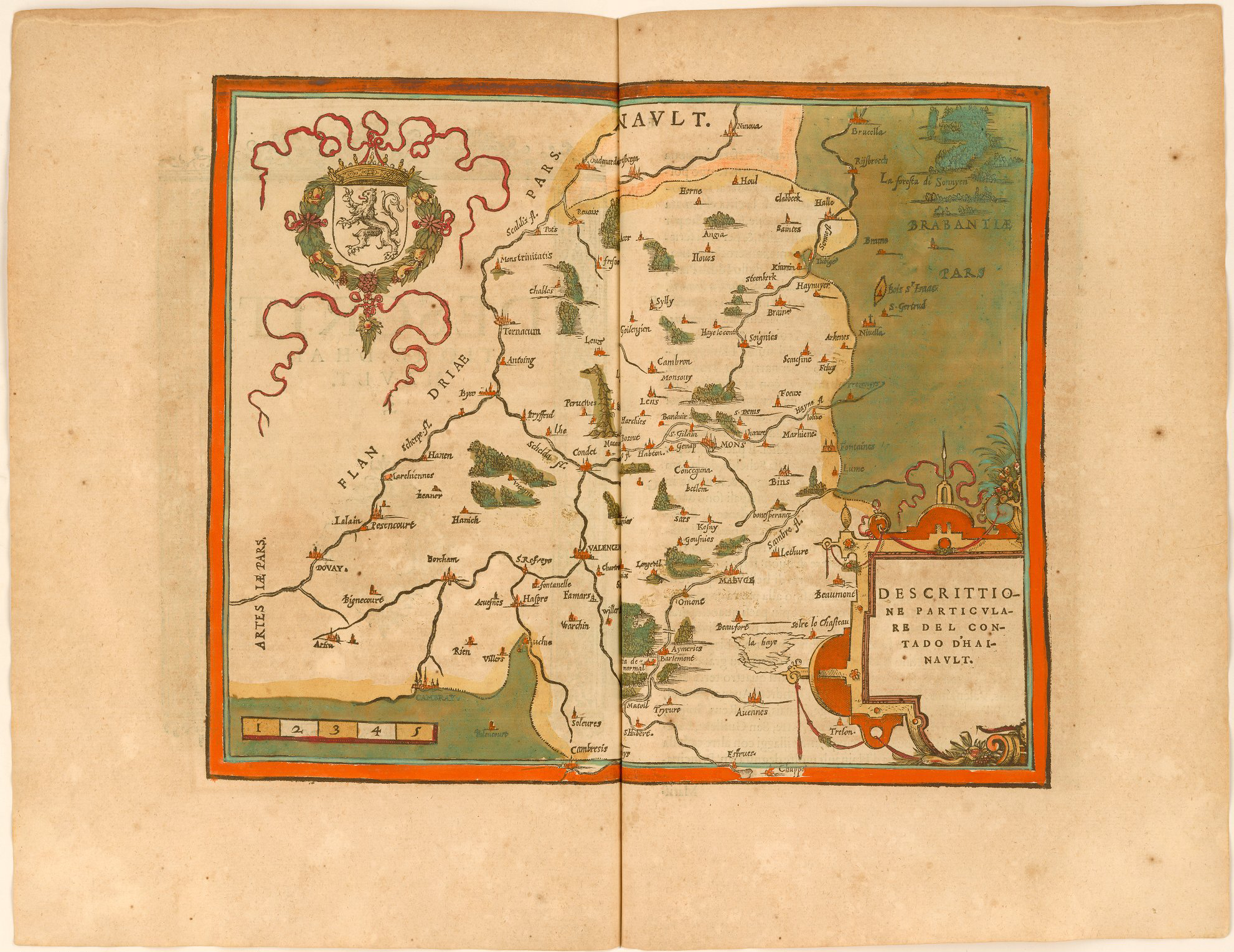

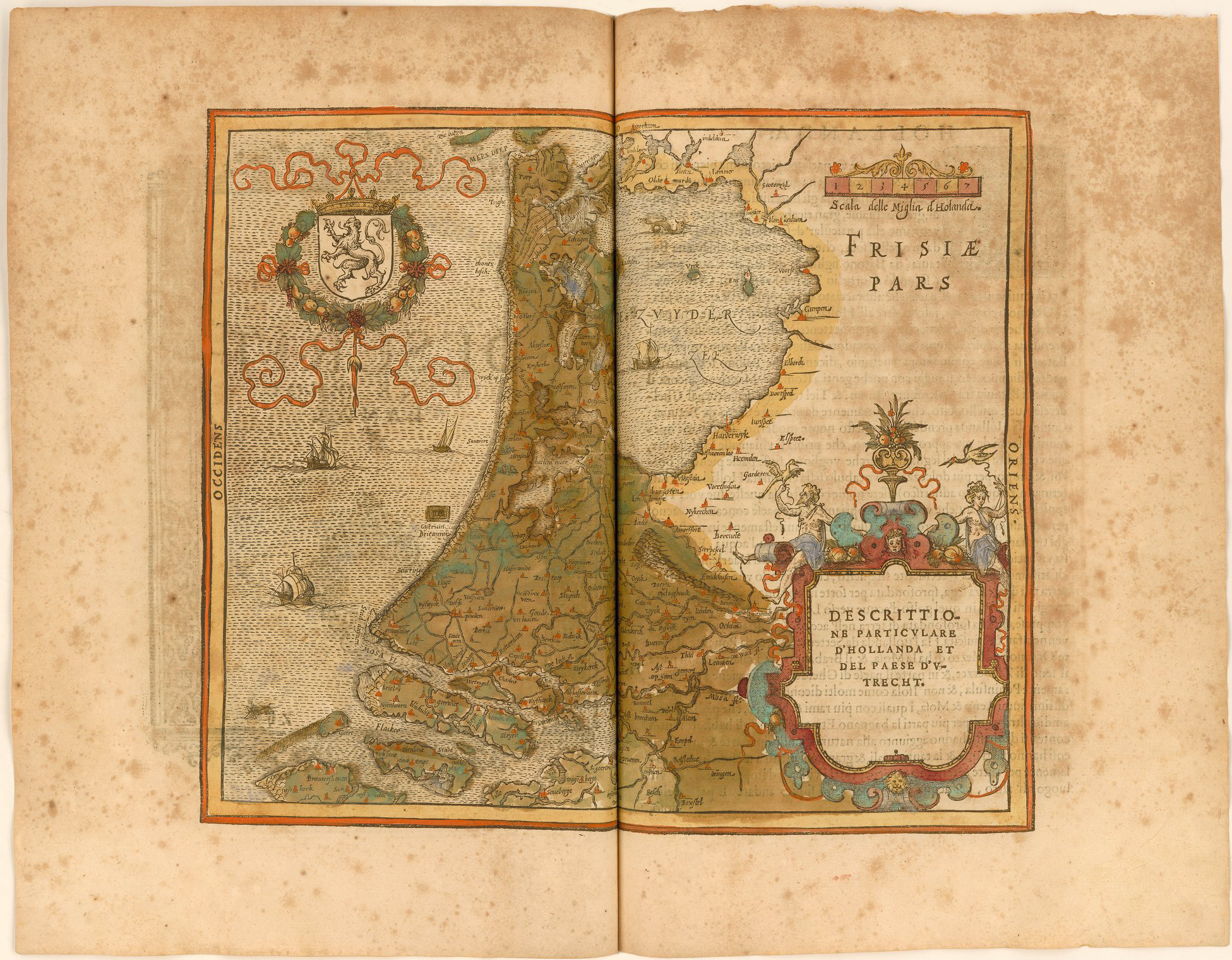

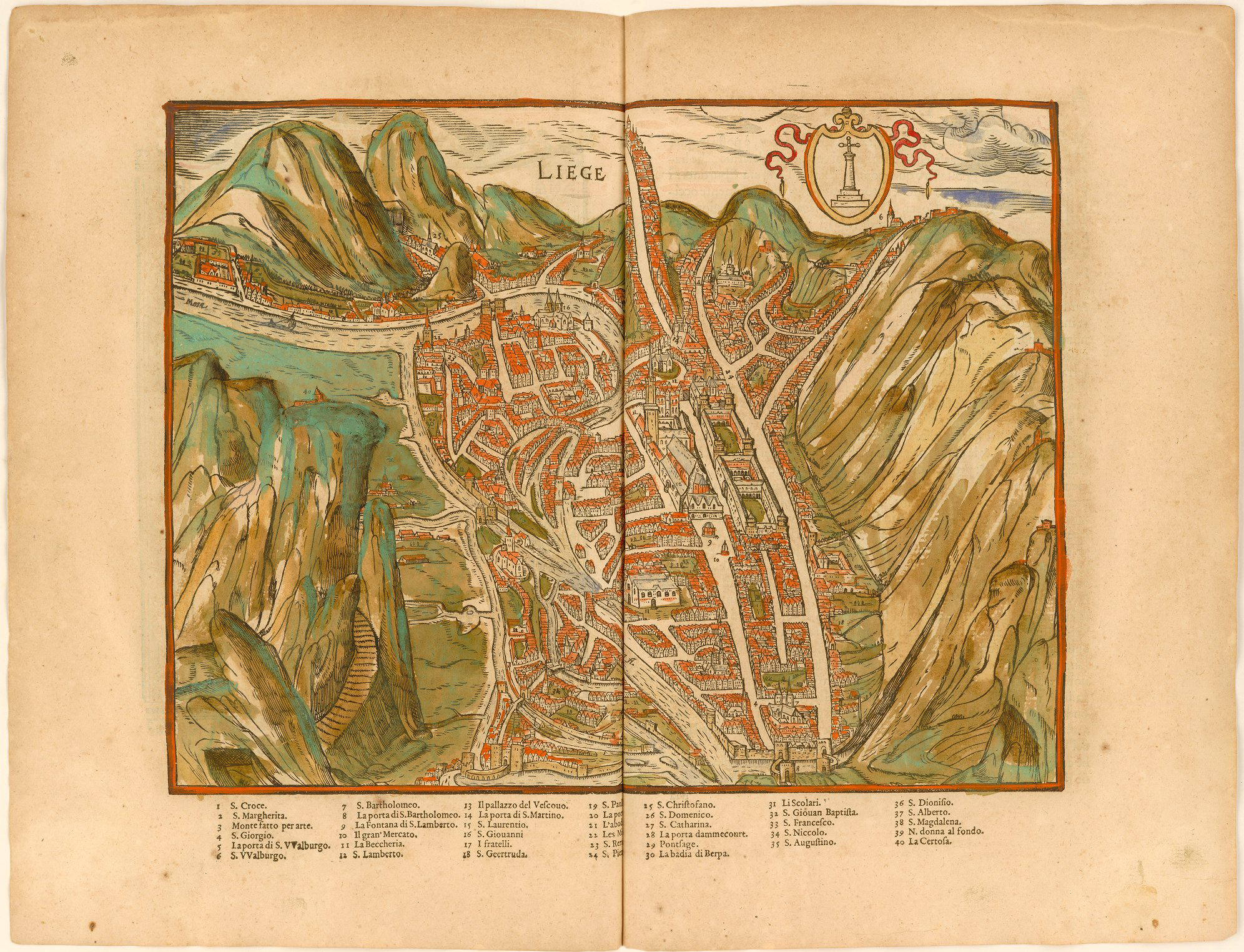

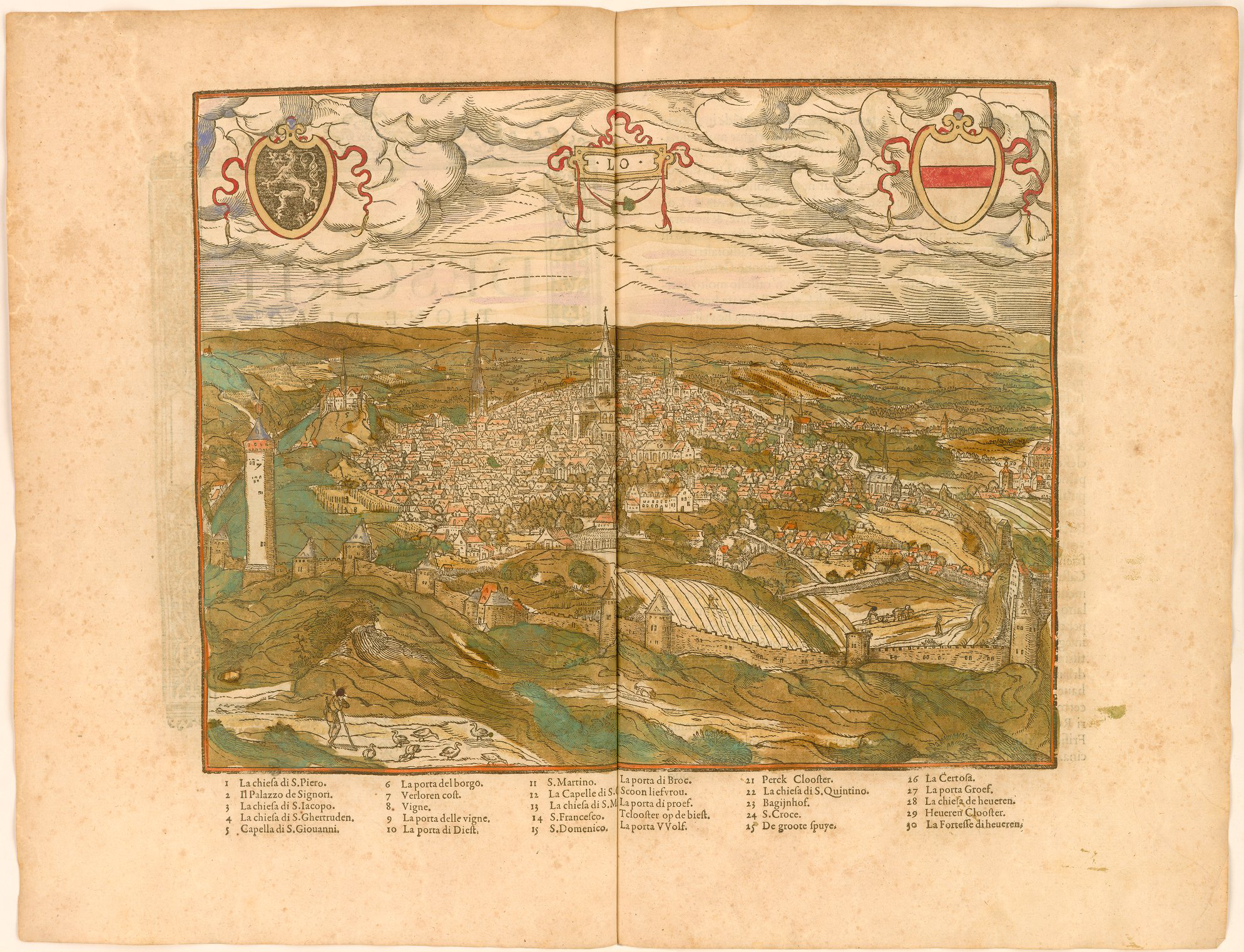

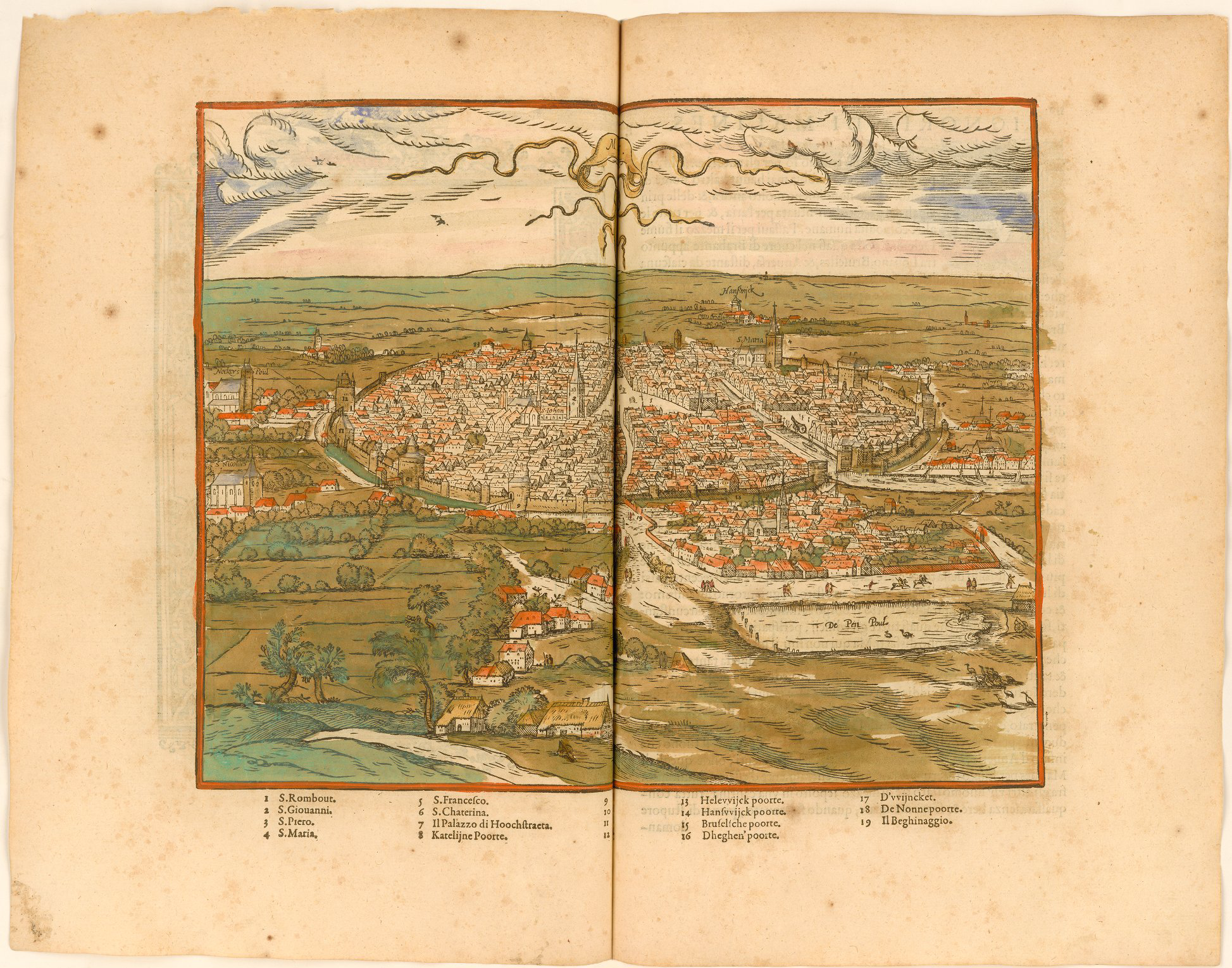

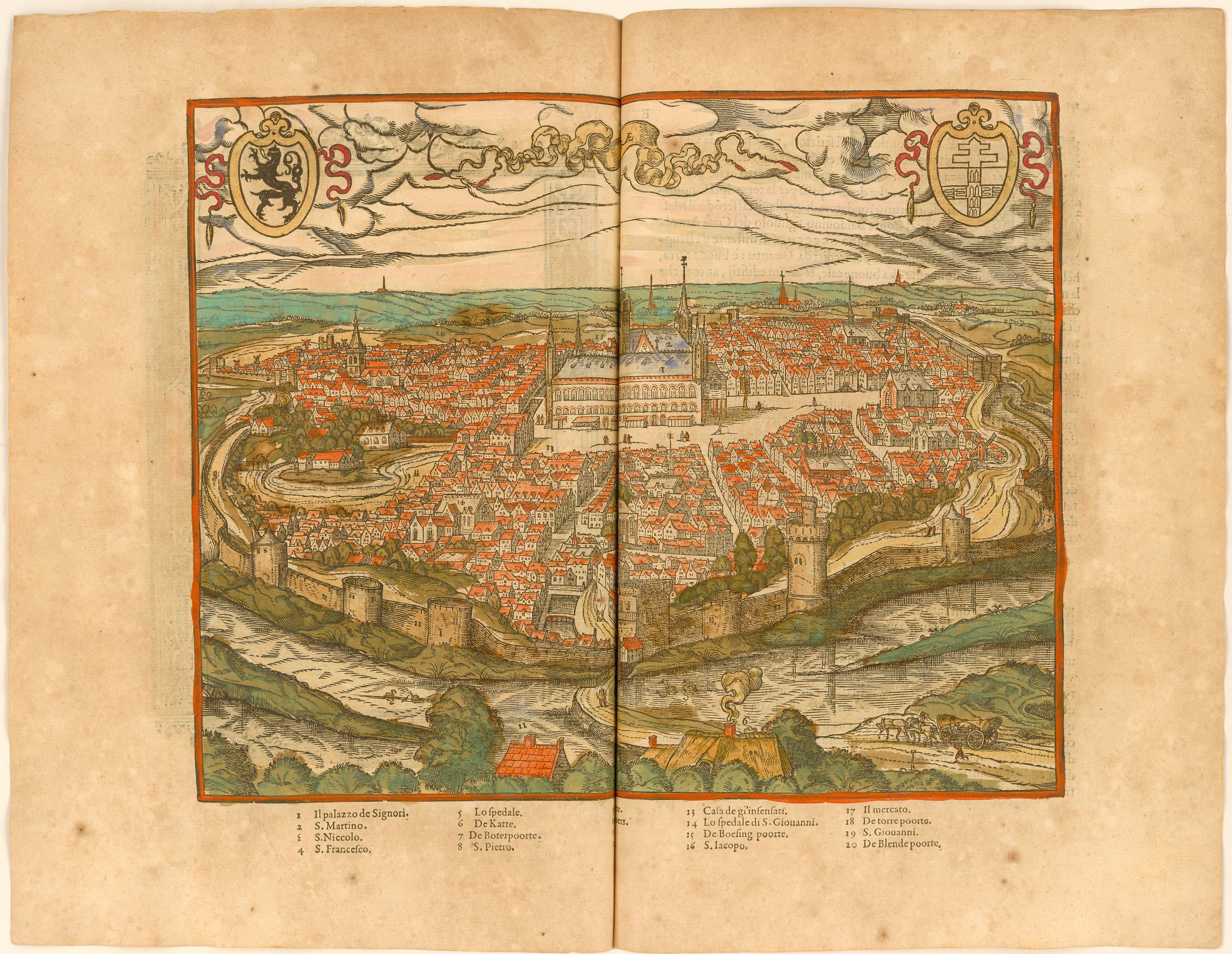

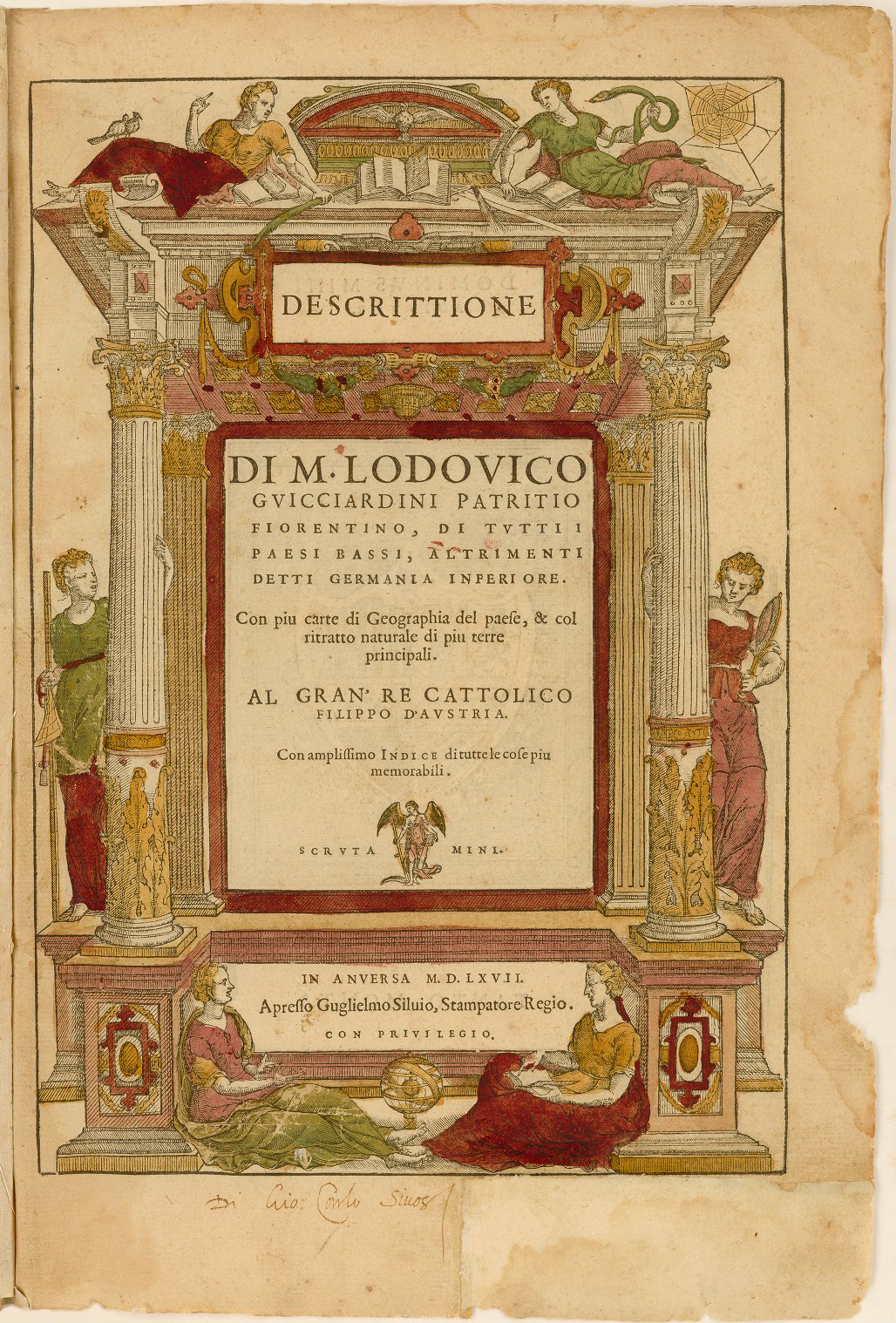

== Sources ==
- Guicciardini, Lodovico [Lodovico di Jacopo di Piero Guicciardini], Grove Art Online, Oxford University Press, accessed November 22, 2007
