= Guicciardini =

The House of Guicciardini (pronounced [ɡwittʃarˈdiːni]) is an old and important Florentine family, which originated from Mugello as rich landowners and moved to Florence in the 14th century. When Francesco Guicciardini (1851–1915) married Princess Luisa Strozzi-Majorca-Renzi (1859–1933), this line of the family changed its name to Guicciardini-Strozzi.

== Notable members ==
- Francesco Guicciardini (1483–1540), Italian historian and statesman
- Lodovico Guicciardini (1521–1589), his nephew, Italian historian active in Antwerp
- Francesco Guicciardini (politician) (1851–1915), Italian politician
- Niccolò Guicciardini (born 1957), Italian historian of mathematics
