= Can vei la lauzeta mover =

12th-century song written by Bernart de Ventadorn

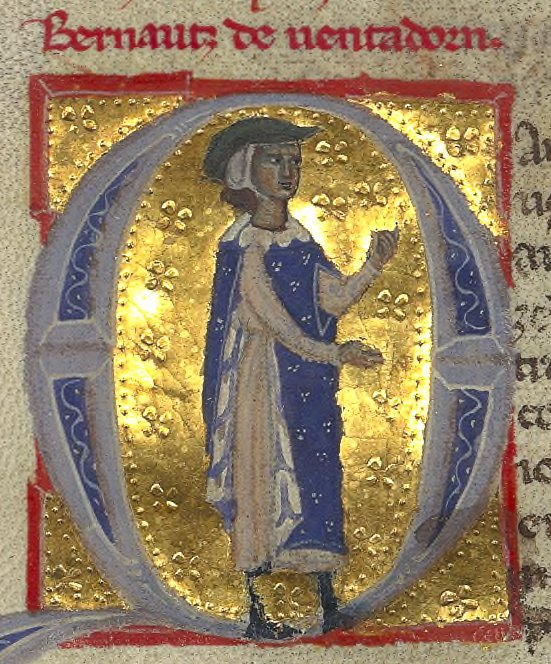
Bernart de Ventadorn

Can vei la lauzeta mover (PC 70.43) is a song written in the Occitan language by Bernart de Ventadorn, a 12th-century troubadour. It is among both the oldest and best known of the troubadour songs. Both the lyrics and the melody of the song survive, in variants from three different manuscripts.

It is one of the first poems "to dramatise the effect of someone actually speaking in the present", in part by its formulation as a first-person narrative. Its lyrics are arranged in seven stanzas of eight lines, ending in a four-line coda. The first two verses speak of a lark (the "lauzeta" of the title) flying with joy into the sun, forgetting itself, and falling, with the speaker wishing he could be so joyful, but unable because of his unrequited love for a woman. In subsequent verses, the subject compares himself to Narcissus and Tristan, and promises to go into exile if the woman he loves does not return his love.

This song is one of three Occitan verses interpolated into the 13th century French-language romance Guillaume de Dole, and one of two similar interpolations in Gerbert de Montreuil's Le roman de la violette. Some scholars have suggested that this song inspired a tercet in Dante Alighieri's Divine Comedy, Paradiso XX:73–75, which also describes the flight of a lark; however, others have suggested that Dante might have come by this image indirectly through Bondie Dietaiuti, or that this sight would have been common enough that no connection between the two poems can be ascribed. Ezra Pound included a translation of parts of this song in Canto 6 of The Cantos, and returned to the same image in Canto 117.

The song continues to be performed, and recordings are available on many albums.
