= Morano (publishing house) =

Italian publishing house

Morano is an Italian publishing house which was founded in Naples in 1849.

Established during a difficult period in the history of Naples, it performed an important role in the diffusion of culture, publishing the writings of Giambattista Vico, Adolfo Bartoli, Vincenzo Gioberti and, later, above all, those of Francesco de Sanctis and Luigi Settembrini.

The press, directed for a long period by the Neapolitan Antonio Morano (1899–1993), published series in the areas of philosophy, law, and school textbooks.

== Sources ==
- This article originated as a translation of this version of its counterpart in the Italian Wikipedia.
