= Francesco de Sanctis =

Italian literary critic and scholar (1817–1883)

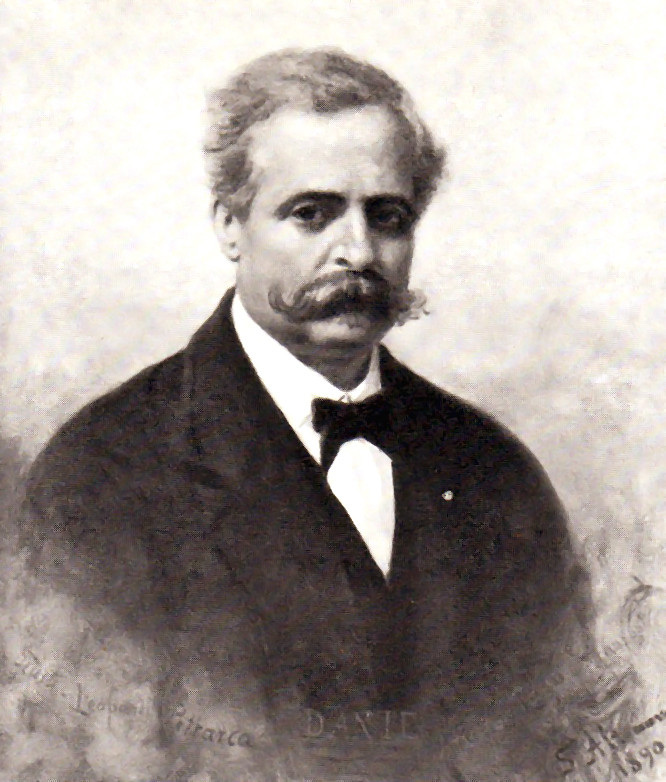
An 1890 portrait of Francesco De Sanctis by Francesco Saverio Altamura

Francesco de Sanctis (28 March 1817 – 29 December 1883) was an Italian literary critic, scholar and politician, leading critic and historian of Italian language and literature during the 19th century.

== Biography ==
De Sanctis was born in the southern Italian town of Morra Irpina (renamed Morra De Sanctis in his honor in 1937) to a family of middle-class landowners. His father was a doctor in law and his two paternal uncles, one a priest and the other a medic, were exiled for having participated in the Carbonari Uprisings of 1820–1821. After completing his high school studies in nearby Naples, he was educated at the Italian language institute in Naples founded by Marquis Basilio Puoti (1782–1847).

De Sanctis later opened his own private school where he soon became recognized in academic circles for his profound knowledge of Italian literature. In 1848, he held office under the revolutionary government and was later imprisoned for three years in Naples. Following his release, de Sanctis' reputation as a lecturer in Turin on Italian authors such as Dante Alighieri (c. 1265–1321) led to his professorship in 1856 at ETH Zurich.

De Sanctis returned to Naples as minister of public instruction in 1860, and filled the same post under the Italian monarchy in 1861, 1878 and 1879, having in 1861 become a deputy in the Italian chamber. In 1871, he was made professor of comparative literature at Naples University.

De Sanctis was a supporter of Darwinism, and lectured on the subject.

As a literary critic, De Sanctis was highly regarded, notably with his Storia della letteratura italiana and his critical studies. These were published in several volumes, some of them posthumously, in Naples in 1883.

De Sanctis had many faithful disciples, among whom Benedetto Croce achieved the most fame. His chief contribution as a philosopher was to aesthetics and his influence upon Italian literary criticism remains strong to the present day.

== Bibliography ==
Storia della letteratura italiana, Vol. 1, 1912 reprint (complete text)

- Saggi critici, Rondinella, Napoli, 1849.
- La prigione, Benedetto, Torino, 1851.
- Saggi critici, Morano, Napoli, 1869.
- Storia della letteratura italiana, Morano, 1870.
- Un viaggio elettorale, Morano, Napoli, 1876.
- Studio sopra Emilio Zola, Roma, 1878.
- Nuovi saggi critici, Morano, Napoli, 1879.
- Zola e l'assommoir, Treves, Milano, 1879.
- Saggio sul Petrarca, Morano, Napoli, 1883.
- Studio su G. Leopardi, a cura di R. Bonari, Morano, Napoli, 1885.
- La giovinezza di Francesco De Sanctis, a cura di Pasquale Villari, Morano, Napoli, 1889.
- Purismo illuminismo storicismo, scritti giovanili e frammenti di scuola, lezioni, a cura di A. Marinari, 3 voll., Einaudi, Torino, 1975.
- La crisi del romanticismo, scritti dal carcere e primi saggi critici, a cura di M. T. Lanza, introd. di G. Nicastro, Einaudi, Torino, 1972.
- Lezioni e saggi su Dante, corsi torinesi, zurighesi e saggi critici, a cura di S. Romagnoli, Einaudi, Torino, 1955, 1967.
- Saggio critico sul Petrarca, a cura di N. Gallo, introduzione di Natalino Sapegno, Einaudi, Torino, 1952.
- Verso il realismo, prolusioni e lezioni zurighesi sulla poesia cavalleresca, frammenti di estetica e saggi di metodo critico, a cura di N. Borsellino, Einaudi, Torino, 1965.
- Storia della letteratura italiana, a cura di N. Gallo, introd. di N. Sapegno, 2 voll., Einaudi, Torino, 1958.
- Manzoni, a cura di C. Muscetta e D. Puccini, Einaudi, Torino, 1955.
- La scuola cattolica-liberale e il romanticismo a Napoli, a cura di C. Muscetta e G. Candeloro, Einaudi, Torino, 1953.
- Mazzini e la scuola democratica, a cura degli stessi, Einaudi, Torino, 1951, 1961.
- Leopardi, a cura di C. Muscetta e A. Perna, Einaudi, Torino, 1961.
- L'arte, la scienza e la vita, nuovi saggi critici, conferenze e scritti vari, a c. di M. T. Lanza, Einaudi, Torino, 1972.
- Il Mezzogiorno e lo Stato unitario, scritti e discorsi politici dal 1848 al 1870, a c. di F. Ferri, Einaudi, Torino, 1960.
- I partiti e l'educazione della nuova Italia, a c. di N. Cortese, Einaudi, Torino, 1970.
- Un viaggio elettorale, seguito da discorsi biografici, dal taccuino elettorale e da scritti politici vari, a cura di N. Cortese, Einaudi, Torino, 1968.
- Epistolario (1836-1862) a c. di G. Ferretti, M. Mazzocchi Alemanni e G. Talamo, 4 voll., 1956-69.
- Lettere a Pasquale Villari, a c. di F. Battaglia, Einaudi, Torino, 1955.
- Lettere politiche (1865-80), a c. di A. Croce e G. B. Gifuni, Ricciardi, Milano-Napoli, 1970.
- Lettere a Teresa, a cura di A. Croce, Ricciardi, Milano-Napoli, 1954.
- Lettere a Virginia, a cura di Benedetto Croce, Laterza, Bari, 1917.
- Mazzini, a cura di Vincenzo Gueglio, Genova, Fratelli Frilli, 2005. ISBN 88-7563-148-4.
