= M. Lincoln Schuster =

American publishing executive (1897–1970)

- Born: Max Schuster; March 2, 1897; Kałusz, Austria-Hungary
- Died: December 20, 1970 (aged 73); New York City, U.S.
- Education: Columbia University (BA)
- Occupation: Businessman
- Known for: Co-founder of Simon & Schuster
- Spouse: Ray Haskell
- Children: 3
- Parent(s): Barnet Schuster; Esther Stieglitz Schuster

Max Lincoln Schuster (born Max Schuster) (/ˈʃuːstər/ SHOO-stər; March 2, 1897 – December 20, 1970) was an American book publisher and the co-founder of the publishing company Simon & Schuster. Schuster was instrumental in the creation of Pocket Books, and the mass paperback industry, along with Richard L. Simon, Robert F. DeGraff and Leon Shimkin. Schuster published many famous works of history and philosophy including the Story of Civilization series of books by Will Durant and Ariel Durant.

== Biography ==
=== Early life and education ===
Max Schuster was born to a Jewish family on March 2, 1897, in Kałusz, then Austria-Hungary, today Ukraine. His parents, Barnet and Esther Stieglitz Schuster, were American citizens and brought Schuster to America at age six weeks. Barnet Schuster ran a stationery and cigar store in Washington Heights, and it was there that Max attended DeWitt Clinton High School. While in high school, Max Schuster adopted "Lincoln" as his middle name to honor his interest in President Abraham Lincoln. Schuster entered college at age 16, and attended the Pulitzer Graduate School of Journalism at Columbia University and received a degree in 1917.

=== Early career ===
Schuster's first job in publishing was as a copy boy for the New York Evening World in 1913. During his time at Columbia University, he was a correspondent for the Boston Evening Transcript, the United Press and he also contributed to various magazines. He later became a member of the United Press Washington staff.

During World War I, Schuster was the chief of publicity for the Bureau of War Risk Insurance at the Treasury Department and an aide to Admiral T. J. Cowle, paymaster general of the Navy. His job was to write pamphlets to support the country's war bond drive.

=== Simon and Schuster ===
Schuster co-founded Simon & Schuster in 1924 and over the years served as president, editor-in-chief, and chairman of the board. Schuster met Richard L. Simon in 1921 while Schuster was editing a trade magazine and Simon was a piano salesman but would soon join publisher Boni & Liveright as a salesman. They founded Simon & Schuster together in 1924 with an investment of $3,000 each. At the time, crossword puzzles were popular in newspapers, and Simon's aunt suggested that they publish a book of them so she could have more to work on. They took her advice, opened up an office in Manhattan (at 37 West Fifty-Seventh Street) with two desks facing each other, and hired Margaret Farrar to compile The First Cross Word Puzzle Book with a print run of 3,600 copies. They advertised the book in newspapers right next to the newspaper's crossword puzzle – although, since they were uncertain as to the book's success, they credited it to "Plaza Publishing" so as to not be associated with a potential failure. Within three months, they had sold more than 100,000 copies. By 1925, they had sold over one million books and had made appearances on the Publishers Weekly's bestseller list.

Schuster had a liking for both academic subjects and populist subject-matter. He championed works of philosophy, history and great literature. Schuster was responsible for the publication of the Will and Ariel Durant series on the Story of Civilization. Schuster discovered Durant's work in a series of pamphlets called Little Blue Books published by Haldeman-Julius and sold for ten cents a copy. He convinced Durant to write The Story of Philosophy which became a bestseller in 1927. This relationship turned into a 50-year undertaking by Will and his wife Ariel to write The Story of Civilization.

Schuster also edited A Treasury of the World's Great Letters, From Ancient Times to Our Own Time. Schuster began collecting and copying letters after reading Beethoven's letters to his "immortal beloved".

His background in journalism also gave Schuster what biographer Al Silverman described as a "populist bent". In the New York Herald, reviewer Lewis Gannet wrote, "You have been, you are, you always will be, a newspaperman in the book publishing business." In his memoir, Another Life: A Memoir of Other People, Michael Korda described how Max Schuster worked. Korda said that Schuster rose early every morning and breakfasted at the Oak Room of the Plaza Hotel, where he would clip articles from the morning newspapers looking for ideas for books.

Schuster's style impacted both the style and look for Simon & Schuster. Schuster's prose, Korda wrote, "was unmistakable and over the years became the S&S house style, a heady, oracular mash of superlatives, puns, and one-liners that most people at S&S could write by the yard but that only Max actually spoke." Korda also described how Schuster, "understood, as very few people in publishing have, the power of simple ideas. Nobody was better at inventing books that filled a need, or at describing them with the kind of enthusiasm that sold them in quantity, or at breaking down the reasons for buying them into one-line sentences." Schuster showcased his prose by writing (with Simon) an advertising column called the Inner Sanctum. Schuster also chose Jean-François Millet's the Sower to be the logo for Simon & Schuster as a representation of disseminating knowledge.

Schuster was described by Al Silverman as someone who wore thick glasses, severe clothes and "tended to be uncomfortable in the presence of the other people."

In 1966, Schuster retired and sold his interest in Simon & Schuster to Leon Shimkin for around $2 million. As part of an agreement, Schuster was excluded from publishing for two years. At the end of the two years, Schuster formed an editorial partnership with his wife, Ray Schuster, but he died within four years of retirement.

== Personal life ==
Schuster was married to Ray Haskell who had three daughters from a previous marriage. He died on December 20, 1970 at his home in New York City. Services were held at Temple Emanu-El in Manhattan.

== Notable books published ==
- The Story of Civilization by Will Durant and Ariel Durant
- Men of Art
- Men of Music
- Men of Mathematics
- How to Read a Book
- How to Raise a Dog
- How to Think Straight
- How to Torture Your Friends
- How to Play Winning Checkers
- How to Start Housekeeping
- How to Improve Your Memory
- How to Win Friends and Influence People
- A Treasury of the World's Greatest Letters, From Ancient Days to Our Own Time

== Awards ==
- Columbia School of Journalism, 50th anniversary medallion (1962)

== Clubs and memberships ==
- American Geographical Society, Fellow
- Friends of Script Mathematics, Member
- Bibliographical Society of America, Member
- Shakespeare Fellowship, Member
- Dutch Treat Club, Member
- Lotos Club, Member
- Book Table, Member
- Overseas Press Club, Member
- Pulitzer School of Journalism, Member
- Montefiore and New York Jewish Hospitals, Trustee
- Columbia School of Journalism, President of Alumni Group
