= Joseph McCabe =

English writer and speaker on freethought

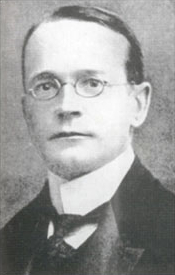
- Born: 12 November 1867; Macclesfield, England
- Died: 10 January 1955 (aged 87)
- Education: Catholic University of Louvain
- Occupations: Writer, lecturer, priest

Joseph Martin McCabe (12 November 1867 – 10 January 1955) was an English writer and speaker on freethought, after having been a Roman Catholic priest earlier in his life. He was "one of the great mouthpieces of freethought in England". Becoming a critic of the Catholic Church, McCabe joined groups such as the Rationalist Association and the National Secular Society. He criticised Christianity from a rationalist perspective, but also was involved in the South Place Ethical Society which grew out of dissenting Protestantism and was a precursor of modern secular humanism.

== Early life ==
McCabe was born in Macclesfield, Cheshire, to a family of Irish Catholic background, but his family moved to Manchester while he was still a child. He entered the Franciscan order at the age of 15, and spent a year of preliminary study at Gorton Monastery. His novitiate year took place in Killarney, after which he was transferred to Forest Gate in Essex (to the school which is now St Bonaventure's Catholic School) for the remainder of his priestly education. In 1890 he was ordained into the priesthood with the name Father Antony.

He was recognised as an outstanding scholar of philosophy, and was sent for a year (1893–1894) to study at the Catholic University of Louvain. Here he was taught Hebrew by Albin van Hoonacker, and, less successfully, Syriac by T. J. Lamy. He also studied under, and befriended, Mercier. He returned to London and resumed priestly and educational duties, until in October 1895 when he was put in charge of the newly founded Franciscan college in Buckingham, (which is now St Bernardine's Catholic Church, Buckingham). He had gradually been losing his faith and eventually left that post and the priesthood in February 1896.

== Writing career ==
Shortly after leaving the priesthood, McCabe began writing. He wrote a pamphlet on his experiences, From Rome to Rationalism, published in 1897, which he then expanded to book length as Twelve Years in a Monastery (1897). William Ferguson wrote of him: "He was bitterly anti-Catholic but also actively undermined religious faith in general." From 1898 to 1899 he was secretary of the Leicester Secular Society, and he was a founding board member in 1899 of the Rationalist Press Association of Great Britain. He wrote prolifically on science, religion, politics, history and culture, writing nearly 250 books during his life. Many of his books and pamphlets were published by E. Haldeman-Julius, both as Little Blue Books and Big Blue Books. Over 100 Big Blue Books by McCabe were published.

McCabe was also respected as a speaker, and gave several thousand lectures in his lifetime.

McCabe was also an advocate of women's rights and worked with Emmeline Pankhurst and Elizabeth Clarke Wolstenholme-Elmy on speeches favouring giving British women the right to vote.

McCabe is also known for his inclusion in G. K. Chesterton's book Heretics. In a previous essay he took Chesterton to task for including humour in his serious writings. By doing so, he allowed Chesterton to make the quip "Mr. McCabe thinks that I am not serious but only funny, because Mr. McCabe thinks that funny is the opposite of serious. Funny is the opposite of not funny, and of nothing else."

McCabe was also active in organisations, although his biographer notes that he had a difficult relationship with some of their leading figures, and consequently relations between McCabe and various groups could also be strained. He was an Appointed Lecturer at the South Place Ethical Society, where he could still occasionally be heard after 1934. McCabe's freethought stance grew more militant as he got older, and he joined the National Secular Society in the year before he died.

=== Evolution ===
In 1900 McCabe translated the book Riddle of the Universe by Ernst Haeckel. He also wrote a number of works on evolution. McCabe was involved with the Rationalist Association and in 1925 they arranged for him to debate the early Canadian young earth creationist George McCready Price.

=== Religion ===
In his essays The Myth of the Resurrection (1925) and Did Jesus Ever Live? (1926) McCabe wrote that Christianity is a direct representation of older Pagan beliefs. Slain saviours and their resurrection myths were currently known and celebrated across the ancient world before Christianity began. According to McCabe the Gospel accounts of the Resurrection of Jesus contain numerous conflicts, contradictions and errors and are unreliable as they had been fabricated over the years by many different writers. McCabe came to the conclusion that Jesus was an Essenian holy man who was turned into a God over the years by hearsay and oral tradition. The real bulk of McCabe's work was in historical criticism of the Roman Catholic religious system in which he was raised and educated.

In about 1947, McCabe accused the Encyclopædia Britannica of bias towards the Catholic Church. He claimed that the 14th edition, which had been published in 1929, was devoid of the critical comment about the church that had been in the 11th edition. McCabe similarly accused the Columbia Encyclopedia of bias towards the Catholic Church in 1951. These and similar actions have made him be termed a "Catholic basher" by his Christian critics. Biographer Bill Cooke, however, disputes the allegation, citing McCabe's opinion that "Catholics are no worse, and no better, than others", and "I have not the least prejudice against the Catholic laity, which would be stupid."

=== Spiritualism ===
In 1920 McCabe publicly debated the Spiritualist Arthur Conan Doyle on the claims of Spiritualism at Queen's Hall in London. McCabe later published his evidence against Spiritualism in a booklet entitled Is Spiritualism Based on Fraud?. McCabe had exposed the tricks of fraud mediums and wrote that Spiritualism has no scientific basis. His article Scientific Men and Spiritualism is a sceptical analysis of the subject and a look at how various scientists such as William Crookes and Cesare Lombroso had been duped into believing Spiritualism by mediumship tricks. He also wrote the book Spiritualism: A Popular History from 1847.

== Works ==
The 'Big Blue Books': (a selection of titles available online)

- The Vatican's Last Crime
- How the Pope Of Peace Traded In Blood
- How the Cross Courted The Swastika For Eight Years
- The Vatican Buries International Law
- Hitler Dupes The Vatican
- Treitschke and the Great War
- The War And Papal Intrigue
- The Pious Traitors Of Belgium And France
- The Pope And The Italian Jackal
- Atheist Russia Shakes The World
- Fascist Romanism Defies Civilization
- The Totalitarian Church Of Rome
- The Tyranny Of The Clerical Gestapo
- Rome Puts A Blight On Culture
- The Church The Enemy Of The Workers
- The Church Defies Modern Life
- The Holy Faith Of Romanists
- How the Faith Is Protected
- The Artistic Sterility Of The Church
- The Fruits Of Romanism

Some Other Works:

- Twelve Years in a Monastery, Smith, Elder & Co (1897)
- Peter Abélard. London: Gerald Duckworth and Company Ltd. 1901.
- The Religion of Woman: an Historical Study, Watts & Co., introduction by Lady Florence Dixie
- Evolution: A General Sketch From Nebula to Man. New York: Frederick A. Stokes Company. 1909.
- The Evolution of Mind. London: Adam & Charles Black. 1910.
- Christianity or secularism: which is the better for mankind?. London: Watts & Co. 1911. OCLC 844556321.
- Goethe: The Man And His Character. London: Eveleigh Nash. 1912.
- Why I Left the Church. London: Watts & Co. 1912.
- The Story of Evolution. London: Hutchinson & Co. 1912.
- The Existence of God. The Inquirer's Library 1. London: Watts & Co. 1913.
- The Sources of the Morality of the Gospels. London: Watts & Co. 1914.
- The War and the Churches. London: Watts & Co. 1915.
- Crises in The history of The Papacy: A Study of Twenty Famous Popes whose Careers and whose Influence were important in the Development of The Church and in The History of The World. New York; London: G.P. Putnam's Sons. 1916.
- The Popes and their Church: a Candid Account. London: Watts & Co. 1918.
- A Biographical Dictionary of Modern Rationalists. London: Watts & Co. 1920. See List of names in A Biographical Dictionary of Modern Rationalists
- The Evolution of Civilization. London: Watts & Co. 1920.
- The ABC of Evolution. New York: G. P. Putnam's Sons. 1925.
- The Human Origin of Morals. Little Blue Book 1061. Girard, Kansas: Haldeman-Julius Publications. 1926. Archived from the original on 18 October 2005.
- Christianity and Slavery. Little Blue Book 1127. Girard, Kansas: Haldeman-Julius Publications. 1926.
- The Psychology of Religion. Little Blue Book 446. Girard, Kansas: Haldeman-Julius Publications. 1927. Archived from the original on 21 June 2010.
- The Story of Religious Controversy. Boston: The Stratford Company. 1929.
- Why I Believe in Fair Taxation of Church Property. Little Blue Book 1502. Girard, Kansas: Haldeman-Julius Publications. 1930.
- The True Story of the Roman Catholic Church (in six double volumes). Girard, Kansas: Haldeman-Julius Publications. 1930–1931.
- The History and Meaning of the Catholic Index of Forbidden Books. Girard, Kansas: Haldeman-Julius Publications. 1931.
- What Gods cost Man. Little Blue Book 1732. Girard, Kansas: Haldeman-Julius Publications. 1933.
- The Riddle of the Universe To-day. London: Watts & Co. 1934.
- The Social Record of Christianity. Thinker's Library 51. London: Watts & Co. 1935.
- Is The Position of Atheism Getting Stronger?. Girard, Kansas: Haldeman-Julius Publications. 1936.
- Spain in Revolt: 1814-1931. London: John Lane The Bodley Head Limited. 1931.
- The Papacy in Politics Today. London: Watts & Co. 1937.
- A History of the Popes. London: Watts & Co. 1939.
- A Biographical Dictionary of Ancient, Medieval, and Modern Freethinkers. Girard, Kansas: Haldeman-Julius Publications. 1945. (Note that online sources often erroneously date this work to 1920, confusing it with his Biographical Dictionary of Modern Rationalists.)
- The Testament of Christian Civilization. London: Watts & Co. 1946.
- Eighty Years a Rebel; Autobiography. Girard, Kansas: Haldeman-Julius Publications. 1947.
- The Lies and Fallacies of the Encyclopædia Britannica; How Powerful and Shameless Clerical Forces Castrated a Famous Work of Reference. Girard, Kansas: Haldeman-Julius Publications. 1947.
- A Rationalist Encyclopædia: A Book of Reference, On Religion, Philosophy, Ethics, and Science. London: Watts & Co. 1948.
- A History of Satanism: Telling How the Devil Was Born, How He Came to Be Worshipped as a God, and How He Died. Haldeman-Julius Publications. 1948.
- A History of Freemasonry: The Story of its Relationships with Satan and the Popes. Big Blue Book B-790. Girard, Kansas: Haldeman-Julius Publications. 1949.
- Rome's Syllabus of Condemned Opinions: The Last Blast of the Catholic Church's Medieval Trumpet. Big Blue Book B-878. Girard, Kansas: Haldeman-Julius Publications. 1950.
- The Columbia Encyclopedia's Crimes against the Truth. Big Blue Book B-939. Girard, Kansas: Haldeman-Julius Publications. 1951.
- Luther Burbank Speaks Out

== See also ==
- List of names in A Biographical Dictionary of Modern Rationalists

== Bibliography ==
- Cooke, Bill (2001). A Rebel to His Last Breath: Joseph McCabe and Rationalism. Prometheus Books. ISBN 1-57392-878-X
