= Another Life: A Memoir of Other People =

1999 book by Michael Korda

- Author: Michael Korda
- Publisher: Random House
- Publication date: 1999
- ISBN: 9780679456599

Another Life: A Memoir of Other People is an autobiography written by Simon & Schuster publisher Michael Korda and published in the United States in 1999. In this memoir Korda gives an insider account of the world of publishing from the late 1950s through 1990s and creates intimate portraits of the authors, editors, and celebrities he has worked with over the decades.

== Synopsis ==
In Another Life: A Memoir of Other People describes the process of book publishing from the acquisition of a book or author through editing and publication of a manuscript. Korda shares anecdotes about the publishing lunch and anecdotes about working with celebrities like Joan Crawford, Ronald Reagan and agent Irving Lazar. Korda also shares lessons he has learned about the business of publishing.

A good portion of the book describes the changes in the publishing industry over the decades. Korda profiles the publisher, editors and executives that worked for Simon & Schuster such as Robert Gottlieb, Richard E. Snyder, Joni Evans and others. He also gives an account of Simon & Schuster's buy-out by Gulf+Western in 1975 and the rise of publishing mergers and consolidation beginning in the 1970s. He writes about trends in the history of publishing during this time such as the rise of the chain superstores and the changes to publishing due to the rise of technology.

Korda views that publishing is a "reactive business" and that editors and publishers do not make taste or determine people's political views or affect social change but responds to what may be already there. In the book he uses the example of Harriet Beecher Stowe's Uncle Tom's Cabin. Korda's contention isn't that Stowe affected opinions but made apparent opinions that were already felt by the majority on the subject of slavery and brought it to the foreground.

== Reviews and commercial reception ==
The memoir was received warmly by the press. Publishers Weekly described the book " a more candid, engaging and warmly knowledgeable survey of the past 40 years of American publishing cannot be imagined." The New York Times wrote, "The recollection of his adventures in the book trade is a joy to read not only because Korda knows how to tell a good story but also because he never forgets that it is not in the nature of book publishers 'to harbor negative thoughts,' because 'the lifeblood of publishing is enthusiasm, after all, not caution.' Kirkus Reviews called it, "more entertaining than lunch with a power editor at the Four Seasons Grill--full of delicious gossip plus a lesson or two in book publishing.

In 2012 the book was profiled in The New Yorker under What We Are Reading by Michael Agger. Agger states the book "stands as an idiosyncratic history of book publishing’s shift from small, founder-driven houses into a junior wing of the entertainment industry."

== Content ==
=== Authors and celebrities profiled ===
- Alexa Korda
- Alexander Korda
- Ariel Durant
- Barry Diller
- Billy Rose
- Bob Woodward
- Carl Bernstein
- Carlos Casteneda
- Charles G. Bluhdorn
- Claus Von Bulow
- Clay Felker
- Cornelius Ryan
- Dariel Tefler
- David Eisenhower
- Dominique Lapierre
- Fannie Hurst
- Garson Kanin
- Graham Greene
- Gypsy Rose Lee
- Harold Robbins
- Jackie Collins
- Jesse Jackson
- Jimmy Carter
- Joan Collins
- Jacqueline Susann
- Joan Crawford
- Joseph Bonanno
- Julie Nixon Eisenhower
- Kitty Kelley
- Irving Lazar
- Irving Mansfield
- Irving Wallace
- Ladislas Farago
- Larry Collins
- Larry McMurtry
- Marilyn Monroe
- Martin S. Davis
- Merle Oberon
- Milton H. Greene
- Nick Pillegi
- Patrick Murphy
- Paul Hemphill
- Ray Girardin
- R.F. Delderfield
- Richard Adams
- Richard Nixon
- Robert Evans
- Robert Lindsey
- Robert Moses
- Rona Jaffe
- Ronald Reagan
- S.J. Perelman
- Shirley Conran
- Sidney Kingsley
- W. Somerset Maugham
- Stanley Sporkin
- Sunny Von Bulow
- Susan Howatch
- Sylvia Wallace
- Tennessee Williams
- Truman Capote
- Will Durant
- William L. Laurence
- Zoltan Korda

=== Editors, agents and publishers ===
- Alfred A. Knopf
- Bennet Cerf
- Bill Adler
- Blanche Knopf
- Candida Donadio
- David Obst
- Doubleday
- George Weidenfeld
- Gulf + Western
- Harcourt
- Herbert M. Alexander
- Henry Holt
- Jason Epstein
- Joni Evans
- Joseph Barnes
- Justin D. Kaplan
- Kathleen Aston Casey
- Linden Press
- Lynn Nesbit
- Kay Brown
- Larry Ashmead
- Leon Shimkin
- Macmillan Publishing
- M. Lincoln Schuster
- Maxwell Perkins
- Milly Marmur
- Morris Helprin
- Nan Talese
- Nina Bourne
- Patricia Soliman
- Paul Gitlin
- Peter Mayer
- Peter Schwed
- Phyliss Grann
- Phyliss Jackson
- Random House
- Ray Schuster
- Richard Klugar
- Richard Simon
- Richard E. Snyder
- Robert Gottlieb
- Robert Maxwell
- S.I. Newhouse
- Seymour Hersh
- Simon & Schuster
- Tina Brown
- Tony Godwin
- William Jovanovich

== Publication ==
Another Life: A Memoir of Other People was first published in hardcover by Random House in 1999. A trade paperback edition came out in 2000.
