= Heroes of History =

2001 non-fiction book by Will Durant

Heroes of History: A Brief History of Civilization from Ancient Times to the Dawn of the Modern Age
- Author: Will Durant
- Language: English
- Genre: Non-fiction
- Publication date: 2001

Heroes of History: A Brief History of Civilization from Ancient Times to the Dawn of the Modern Age is a book by Will Durant, published in 2001 and was written as a summary of Will and Ariel Durant's The Story of Civilization. It describes important personalities and events in History. These 'Heroes' include Laozi, Muhammad, Kung fu Tze, The Buddha, Mohandas K. Gandhi, Akhenaton, Jewish prophets, Solon, Pericles, Euripides, Socrates, Julius Caesar, Augustus, The Five Good Emperors, Lorenzo de Medici, Leonardo da Vinci, Martin Luther, William Shakespeare and Sir Francis Bacon, among others. Originally planned as a series of audio lectures, Heroes of History was supposed to have twenty-three chapters, but Durant completed only twenty-one before his death in 1981.

== Style ==
Durant wrote Heroes of History more for the layman than the scholar. Historical facts were interspersed with the author's opinions and reflections. "This book is likely to find a wide audience among those looking for an introduction to world history", says John Little of Publishers Weekly, "but the absence of a bibliography and source notes may denote to scholars a certain lack of rigor."

== Contents ==
The twenty-one chapters of Heroes of History can be loosely divided into Ancient Civilizations, The Classical Period, and Renaissance Europe. Durant never mentions Africa (except in a chapter on Ancient Egypt), the Islamic World, the Americas, or Australia. In fact, most of the chapters are set in Europe.

The four Ancient Civilizations described are China, India, the Middle East, and Egypt. The first chapter (China) describes in detail the teachings of Laozi (Lao-Tse) and Kung fu Tze (Confucius), followed by a few samples of Chinese poetry and a biography of the poet Li Po. Chapter two (India) begins with a note on the Indus Valley and Vedic Periods, followed by a detailed description of The Buddha and his teachings. A poem by Ravindranath Tagore, a paragraph on the philosophy of Mahatma Gandhi, and a short description of India under Indira Gandhi follow. The next chapters describe the history of Mesopotamia and Egypt, including a description of the Egyptian monarch Ikhnaton (or Akhenaton).

A chapter on the history of modern-day Israel-Palestine follows, including excerpts from the Old Testament of the Bible.

The classical period chapters describe Greece, and Rome The chapters on Greece describe Solon, the Battle of Marathon, the drama, philosophy, and lifestyle of Periclean Athens, the Peloponnesian War, and Alexander the Great's conquests. Rome is described from its formation and the Monarchy, continues into the Roman Republic and ends with the Roman Empire. The five good emperors - Nerva, Trajan, Hadrian, Antoninus Pius and particularly Marcus Aurelius are covered in detail. The description of this period ends with a chapter on the life and teachings of Jesus Christ.

A single chapter describes the Middle Ages

The Renaissance chapters begin in Florence, describing the Medici and their proteges, move to Rome and the popes (particularly Julius II), and conclude in Venice. Erasmus, Martin Luther, the German Peasants' War, and the Anabaptists are described in the chapters on the Reformation, followed by the Counter-Reformation (Jesuits). The last chapter is on England under Elizabeth I and describes William Shakespeare and Sir Francis Bacon.
