= Michael Korda =

English writer

- Born: 8 October 1933 (age 92); London, United Kingdom
- Citizenship: British
- Education: Institut Le Rosey
- Alma mater: Magdalen College, Oxford
- Occupations: Writer, editor
- Spouse(s): Carolyn Keese (m 1958; div. 1978); Margaret Mogford (m. 1978; died 2017); Margaret Simmons (m. 2020-)
- Children: Chris Korda
- Parent(s): Vincent Korda; Gertrude Musgrove
- Relatives: Alexander Korda (uncle); Zoltan Korda (uncle)
- Writing career
- Language: English
- Notable works: Charmed Lives; Queenie

Michael Korda (born 8 October 1933) is an English-born writer and novelist who was editor-in-chief of Simon & Schuster in New York City.

== Early years ==
Born in London, Michael Korda is the son of English actress Gertrude Musgrove and the Hungarian-Jewish artist and film production designer Vincent Korda. He is the nephew of film magnate Sir Alexander Korda and his brother Zoltan Korda, both of whom were film directors. Korda grew up in the UK but received part of his education in France where his father had worked with film director Marcel Pagnol. As a child, Korda also lived in the United States from 1941 to 1946. He was schooled at the private Institut Le Rosey in Switzerland and read History at Magdalen College, Oxford. He served in the Royal Air Force doing intelligence work in Germany.

The novelist Graham Greene was a lifelong friend. Korda met him on his uncle Alex Korda's yacht.

== Career ==
Korda moved to New York City in 1957 where he worked for playwright Sidney Kingsley as a research assistant and then later as a freelance reader in the CBS story department. In 1958 he joined the book publishing firm Simon & Schuster, beginning as an assistant editor, which included the task of reading slush pile manuscripts for Henry Simon.

He was interested in both fiction and non-fiction. He states in his memoir that he edited books on everything from mathematics and philosophy, memoirs, fiction, translations from French, politics, anthropology and science history among others. One of the first books Korda bought was The Forest People by Colin Turnbull—a memoir of Turnbull's time living with the Mbuti Pygmies in the then Belgian Congo.

After Robert Gottlieb left Simon & Schuster for Alfred A. Knopf, Korda became Editor-in-Chief of Simon & Schuster. Korda was a major figure in the book industry, publishing numerous works by high-profile writers and personalities such as William L. Shirer, Will and Ariel Durant, Harold Robbins, Irving Wallace, Richard Nixon, Richard Rhodes and Ronald Reagan. Korda was a major part of Simon & Schuster for more than forty years. In the autumn of 1994, he was diagnosed as having prostate cancer. In 1997 he wrote Man to Man, which recounted his medical experience. In 2000, he published Another Life: A Memoir of Other People, about the world of publishing.

In addition to being an editor, Korda was also a writer. In the mid-sixties Korda began to write freelance articles for Glamour magazine and eventually wrote their film review column for almost ten years. Korda also wrote for Clay Felker's New York magazine including a piece that eventually became his first book, Male Chauvinism and How it Works at Home and in the Office. Korda's second book, Power!, reached the number one spot on The New York Times Bestseller list in 1975. Korda the writer is represented by agent Lynn Nesbit.

Among Korda's other books are Charmed Lives, which is the story of his father and his two uncles, and the novel Queenie, which is a roman à clef about his aunt, actress Merle Oberon, which was later adapted into a television miniseries. Korda said he felt that Charmed Lives was the book he was born to write, "as if I had been observing and storing up memories with just that purpose in mind for years."

Beginning in the 2000s, Korda wrote a number of history and biography books on the Hungarian Revolution, Dwight Eisenhower, T. E. Lawrence and Robert E. Lee. On writing histories Korda said, "I've always wanted to write history, and it was only the accident of going to work for a book publisher in 1958 (and the need to earn a regular paycheck) that slowed me down".

Michael Korda is Editor-in-Chief Emeritus of Simon & Schuster.

== Private life ==
Michael Korda was married to Carolyn "Casey" Keese from 1958 until their divorce in 1978. They had one child together, Chris, a musician.

Later in 1978, Korda married Margaret Mogford, a former fashion model and the former wife of photographer Burt Glinn. The two shared a love of horses and met at the Claremont Riding Academy near Central Park. He was Mogford's third husband. They co-authored a number of books together including Horse Housekeeping. Mogford died of brain cancer at age 79 in 2017, which Korda detailed in his 2019 memoir Passing. In November 2020, Korda married Margaret (Maggie) Staats Simmons.

Korda has written about his personal life and his hobbies. An avid horseman and fox hunter, he authored Horse People and Horse Housekeeping. In 2001, Korda released Country Matters, which chronicled his life at his home, Stonegate Farm.

== Bibliography ==
External videos
- Book party for Another Life hosted by Kitty Kelley, 7 June 1999, C-SPAN
- Booknotes interview with Korda on Another Life, 11 July 1999, C-SPAN
- Presentation by Korda on Making the List, 7 November 2001, C-SPAN
- Presentation by Korda on Ulysses S. Grant, 10 November 2004, C-SPAN
- Presentation by Korda on With Wings Like Eagles, 19 February 2006, C-SPAN
- Q&A interview with Korda on Ike, 4 October 2007, C-SPAN
- Presentation by Korda on Hero, 30 November 2010, C-SPAN
- Presentation by Korda on Hero, 2 December 2010, Darien, Connecticut Public Library
- Interview with Korda on Alone, 1 June 2017, C-SPAN
- Presentation by Korda on Alone, 30 October 2017, C-SPAN

- Male Chauvinism and How It Works at Home and in the Office, Hodder and Stoughton, 1972 ISBN 0-340-19936-9
- Power! How to Get It, How to Use It, Random House, New York, 1975, ISBN 0-394-49314-1
- Success!, Ballantine Books, New York, 1977, ISBN 0-345-27741-4
- Charmed Lives: A Family Romance, Random House, 1979 ISBN 0394419545
- Worldly Goods, Random House, 1982, ISBN 9780394512518
- Queenie, Simon & Schuster, 1985, ISBN 0671466682
- The Fortune, Summit Books, 1989, ISBN 0671601008
- Curtain, Summit Books, 1991, ISBN 0671686844
- Man to Man: Surviving Prostate Cancer, Little, Brown & Company, 1997, ISBN 0316882976
- Another Life: A Memoir of Other People, Random House, 1999 ISBN 0679456597
- Making the List: A Cultural History of the American Bestseller, 1900–1999, Barnes and Noble Books, 2001, ISBN 0760725594
- Country Matters: The Pleasures and Tribulations of Moving from a Big City to an Old Country Farmhouse, New York: Harper, 2001, ISBN 978-0060197728
- Ulysses S. Grant: The Unlikely Hero, New York: HarperCollins, 2004, ISBN 978-0-06-059015-4
- Marking Time: collecting watches and thinking about time, New York: Barnes & Noble, 2004, ISBN 9780760735763
- Horse People: Scenes from the Riding Life, Harper Perennial, 2004, ISBN 9780060936761
- Horse Housekeeping: Everything You Need to Know to Keep a Horse at Home (co-authored with Margaret Korda), 2005, ISBN 978-0060573089
- Journey to a Revolution: A Personal Memoir and History of the Hungarian Revolution of 1956, Harper Perennial, 2006, ISBN 978-0-06-077262-8
- Ike: An American Hero, Harper, 2007, ISBN 978-0060756659
- With Wings Like Eagles: A History of the Battle of Britain, Harper, 2009, ISBN 978-0-06-112535-5
- Hero: The Life and Legend of Lawrence of Arabia, Harper, 2010, ISBN 978-0-06-171261-6
- Clouds of Glory: The Life and Legend of Robert E. Lee, Harper, 2014, ISBN 978-0-06-211629-1
- Alone: Britain, Churchill, and Dunkirk: Defeat into Victory, Liveright, 2017, ISBN 978-1631491320
- Passing: A Memoir of Love and Death, Liveright, 2019, ISBN 978-1631494642
- Muse of Fire: World War I as Seen Through the Lives of the Soldier Poets, Liveright, 2024, ISBN 978-1631496882

== Notable books as editor or publisher ==
- The Forest People by Colin Turnbull
- The Love Machine (1969) by Jacqueline Susann
- The Story of Civilization VII: The Age of Reason Begins by Will Durant and Ariel Durant
- The Fifth Horseman by Larry Collins and Dominique LaPierre
