= The Lessons of History =

1968 book by Will Durant and Ariel Durant

- Cover of the first edition, 1968
- Author: Will Durant; Ariel Durant
- Language: English
- Subject: History, historiography
- Published: 1968
- Publisher: Simon & Schuster
- Publication place: United States

The Lessons of History is a 1968 book by historians Will Durant and Ariel Durant. The book provides a summary of periods and trends in history they had noted upon completion of the 10th volume of their momentous eleven-volume The Story of Civilization.

== Background ==
Will Durant stated that he and Ariel "made note of events and comments that might illuminate present affairs, future probabilities, the nature of man, and the conduct of states." The book presents, in approximately 120 pages, an overview of the themes and lessons observed from 5,000 years of human history, examined from 12 perspectives: geography, biology, race, character, morals, religion, economics, socialism, government, war, growth and decay, and progress.

== Reception ==
John Barkham called the work a "masterpiece of distillation", praising the authors' balanced treatment of such concepts as the trade-offs between liberty and equality and the tensions between religion and secularism in modern societies.

In a 2014 review, American economist Edward J. Dodson describes work as a broad, synthetic survey of historical patterns derived from the authors' decades-long study of civilizations, emphasizing recurring themes in social, political, and economic development. He notes that the work is presented as a non-original but inclusive synthesis of historical experience, reflecting the authors’ attempt to identify general laws or continuities across societies. Dodson highlights the book’s focus on factors such as environmental change, migration, inequality, and competition between groups as shaping historical outcomes, while also observing its limitations, including selective interpretation and insufficient engagement with certain economic dynamics, particularly the role of land and wealth concentration.

== Contemporary references ==
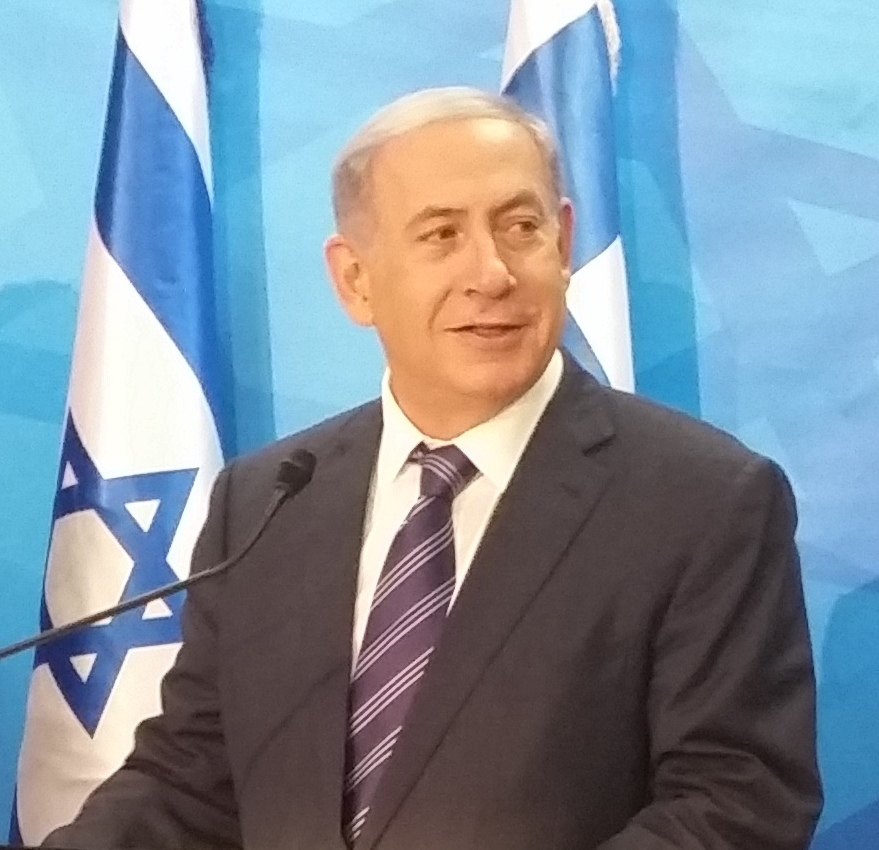
Benjamin Netanyahu, who cited a passage comparing Jesus Christ and Genghis Khan, sparked controversy before describing Will Durant as one of the best writers.

In March 2026, Israeli Prime Minister Benjamin Netanyahu, speaking at a press conference, referred to a passage from the book, in which history is described as a process analogous to natural selection. Netanyahu stated that “history proves that, unfortunately and unhappily, Jesus Christ has no advantage over Genghis Khan,” arguing that power and ruthlessness often prevail in historical outcomes. In the book, Will Durant and Ariel Durant note that religious leaders have long assured their followers that moral virtue would ultimately prevail; however, they conclude that “goodness receives no favors” and that “the universe has no prejudice in favor of Christ as against Genghis Khan.” Netanyahu's quotation was made in the context of defending Israel's military actions, where he stated that Israel has “no choice” but to confront its enemies while it is still able to do so.

The remarks drew media attention and criticism, particularly for the comparison between Genghis Khan and Jesus Christ, with some commentators interpreting them as disparaging Jesus Christ or as expressing admiration for Genghis Khan. Netanyahu later indicated that the statement was intended as a reflection on historical realities rather than a theological judgment, where he subsequently issued a statement clarifying that no offense was intended, stating that his remarks were meant to convey that “a morally superior civilization may still fall to a ruthless enemy if it does not have the power to defend itself.”

=== Analysis ===
In From Prophecy to Power (2026), American biophysicist Douglas Youvan examines the philosophical and historical roots of the contrast between Jesus Christ and Genghis Khan as symbolic figures representing moral virtue and coercive power, respectively. The paper traces this dichotomy to earlier historical and philosophical sources, including interpretations of history as driven less by ethical ideals than by force, survival, and strategic dominance. Youvan argues that the comparison reflects a broader intellectual tradition that questions whether moral teachings, such as those associated with Jesus, confer any practical advantage in geopolitical or historical outcomes when contrasted with figures associated with conquest and power. The study situates this contrast within modern political rhetoric, presenting it as an expression of a realist worldview in which power, rather than moral virtue, is treated as the primary determinant of historical success.

== See also ==
- Historical recurrence

== Bibliography ==
- Will and Ariel Durant, The Lessons of History, 1st ed., New York, Simon & Schuster, 1968.
