= Appeal to Reason (newspaper) =

American socialist weekly periodical

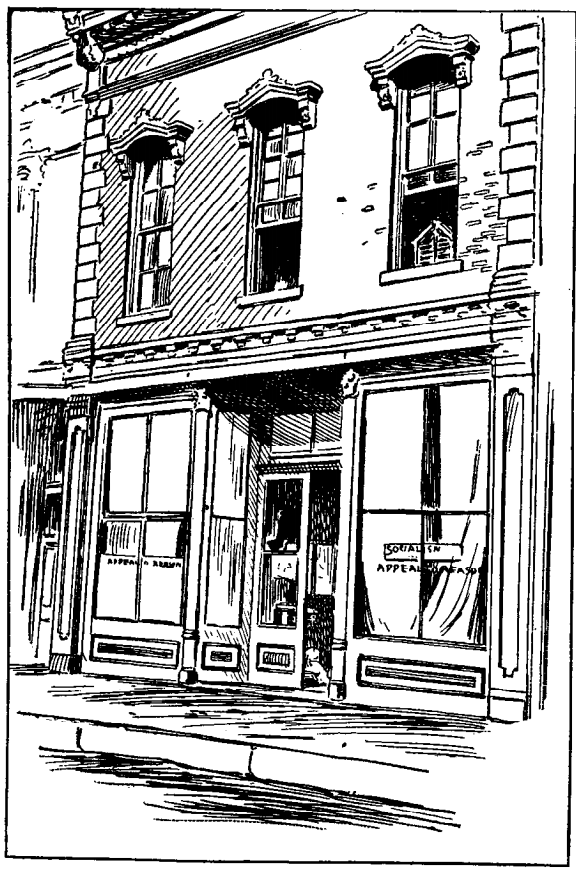
- Office of the Appeal to Reason newspaper in Girard, Kansas
- Type: Weekly newspaper
- Publisher: Julius Wayland
- Editor: Fred Warren (early 20th century)
- Founded: 1895
- Ceased publication: November 1922
- Political alignment: Socialist
- Language: English
- Headquarters: Girard, Kansas
- Circulation: 550,000 (as of 1910)
- OCLC number: 12709512

The Appeal to Reason was a weekly socialist political newspaper published in the American Midwest from 1895 until 1922. The paper was known for its politics, lending support over the years to the Farmers' Alliance and People's Party before becoming a mainstay of the Socialist Party of America, following the organization's establishment in 1901. Making use of a network of highly motivated volunteers known as the "Appeal Army" to spur subscription sales, paid circulation of the Appeal climbed to more than a quarter-million copies by 1906 and half a million by 1910, making it the largest-circulation socialist newspaper in American history.

== Publication history ==
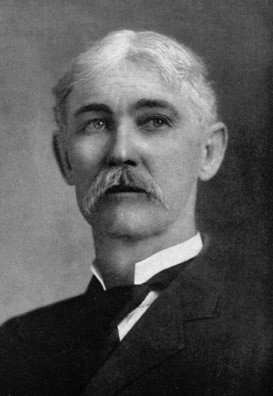
Julius Wayland, publisher

The most direct ancestor of the Appeal was The Coming Nation, a socialist communalist paper established by Julius Augustus Wayland in Greensburg, Indiana. It was moved to the utopian socialist Ruskin Colony in Tennessee as part of an effort to form a socialist colony there. When Wayland tired of the colony, he left his newspaper behind with the colonists, moving to Kansas City, Missouri, to publish his own independently weekly, Appeal to Reason, established on August 31, 1895. In 1912 The Coming Nation listed Girard, Kansas, on its masthead as its place of publication.

Publication of the newspaper was briefly suspended in October 1896 when Wayland left Kansas City, Missouri for the small town of Girard, Kansas, located in the southeastern corner of the state. Girard was the center of coal mining in Kansas and included many radical miners who had recently immigrated from Europe. Although originally just a one-week hiatus was planned, publication was actually suspended for more than three months.

Following the collapse of the Ruskin Colony, a second Coming Nation was published by Wayland at Girard, but folded two years later. The run of the first two incarnations, which followed a continuous whole number scheme, was #1 April 29, 1893, to #512 December 26, 1903.

=== Growth ===
Fred Warren, editor in the early 20th century.

By 1910, the newspaper employed about 60 workers and boasted a "three-deck, straight-line Goss machine that prints four hundred twelve-page papers, in colors, folded, per minute, when desired." The Appeal was based out of a building with the dimensions "...eighty by one hundred feet, two stories and basement." In 1910, it had a weekly circulation of 550,000 and a subscription base of 450,000.

The paper's popularity was powered by a folksy style of writing and the participation of many leading literary luminaries of the Socialist movement, including Upton Sinclair, Jack London, Mary "Mother" Jones, Eugene Debs, and Helen Keller.

=== Decline ===
After founder Wayland died by suicide in 1912, the Appeal slowly lost its vitality. Wayland's sons were not temperamentally suited to the newspaper business. After a series of editorials attacking American militarism and conscription policies during the First World War, the federal government rescinded the paper's second-class mailing rights. This, combined with the post–Russian Revolution “Red Scare” and the restrictions of the Espionage Act (as well as infighting among American socialists), led to a drastic reduction in subscriptions. The paper was sold to Marcet and Emanuel Haldeman-Julius, the latter an editor of the paper. The paper alienated a good part of its antimilitarist socialist readership by endorsing the American war effort. From issue #1151, dated December 22, 1917, to issue #1212 of February 22, 1919, the paper carried the title New Appeal to denote its new patriotic orientation. Building on the subscriber list of the Appeal, from 1919 on, Haldeman-Julius developed a very successful business selling inexpensive paperback booklets known as the Little Blue Books.

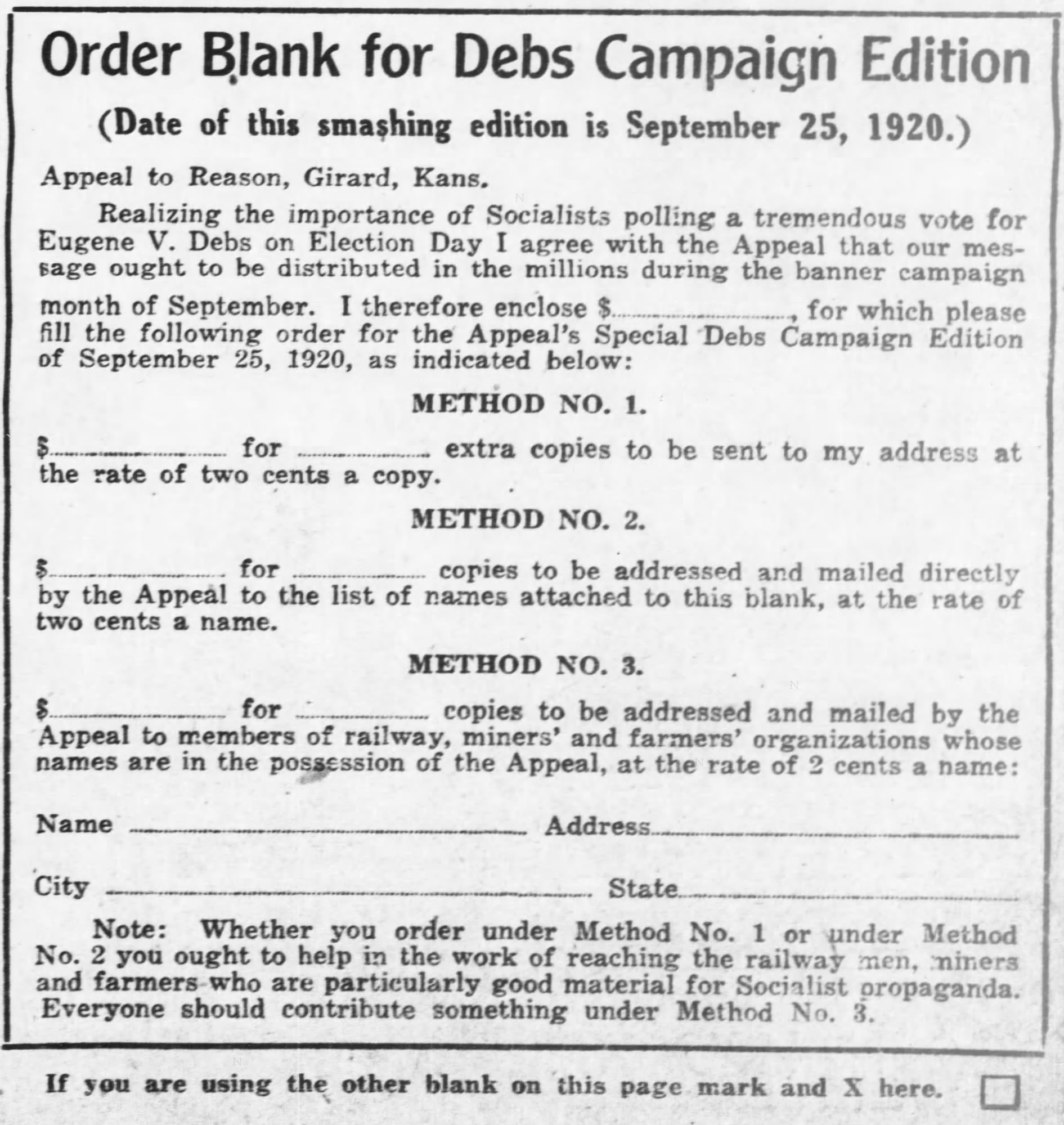
Appeal to Reason supported Eugene V. Debs in the 1920 US presidential election

=== Successors and demise ===
The Appeal to Reason name was terminated in November 1922, to be replaced by the Haldeman-Julius Weekly. This new incarnation rapidly lost its socialist character and became a "house organ" for Haldeman-Julius's lucrative publishing business.

This publication had its name changed again to The American Freeman, effective with issue #1741 of April 13, 1929. This publication continued until Haldeman-Julius' death in November 1951.

=== Legacy ===
Upton Sinclair's novel The Jungle was first published as a serial in the Appeal to Reason, between February 25, 1905, and November 4, 1905. Chapter 30 includes a description of the newspaper, which was read by the novel's protagonist, Jurgis Rudkus.

== Circulation ==
Year	Circulation	Notes and references
1895		
1896		
1897		
1898		
1899		
1900		
1901		
1902		
1903	250,000 (regular issue) + 789,088 (special Jubilee edition)	Appeal, #406 (Sep. 12, 1903), pg. 1.
1904		
1905	162,755	"A Record of Four Years," Appeal #684 (Jan. 9, 1909), pg. 4.
1906	266,512	"A Record of Four Years," Appeal #684 (Jan. 9, 1909), pg. 4.
1907	312,329	"A Record of Four Years," Appeal #684 (Jan. 9, 1909), pg. 4.
1908	293,747	"A Record of Four Years," Appeal #684 (Jan. 9, 1909), pg. 4.
1909		
1910		
1911		
1912	694,065	Front-page banner of 1912 circulation, Appeal #892 (Jan. 4, 1913).
1913		
1914		
1915		
1916		
1917		
1918		
1919		
1920		
1921		
1922		
