= The Story of Civilization =

11-volume set of books covering Western history

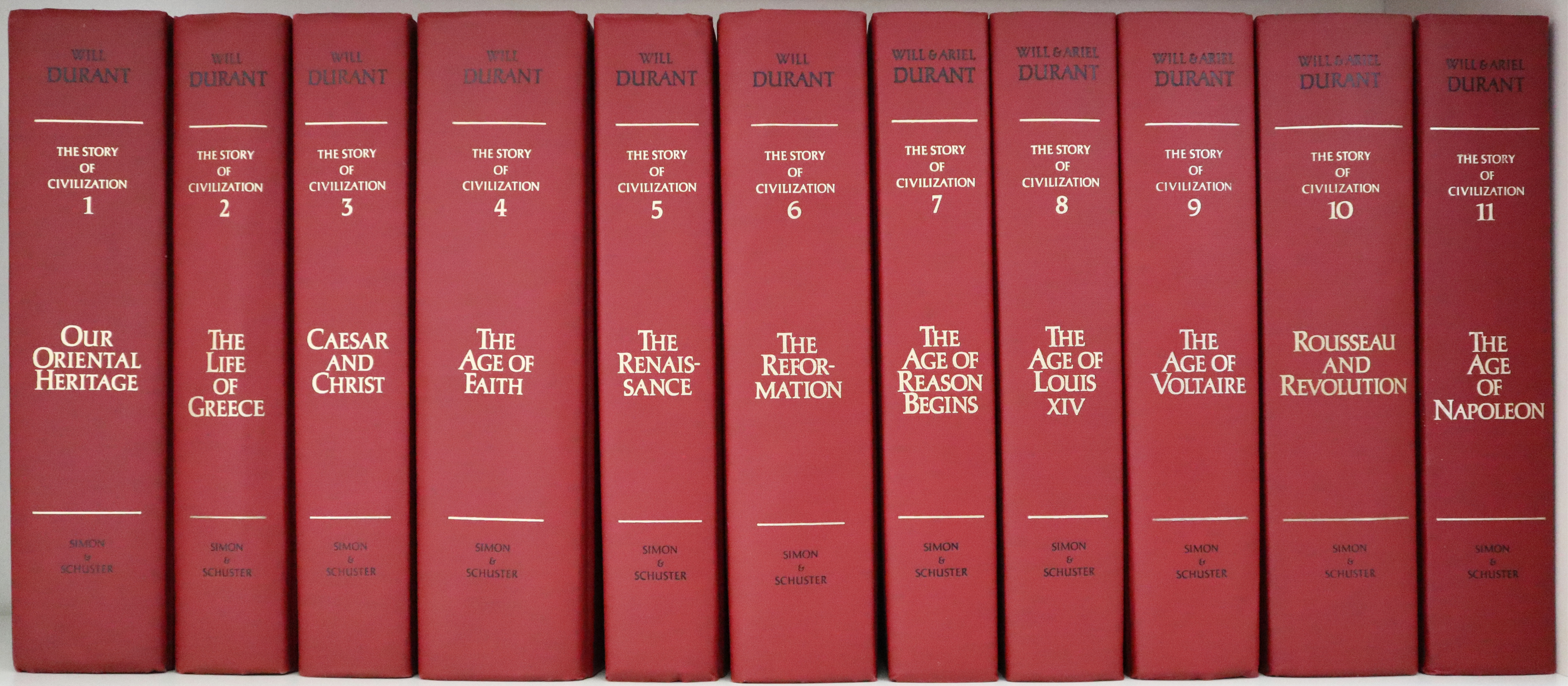
- A set of all eleven volumes
- Author: Will Durant; Ariel Durant
- Language: English
- Subject: History
- Published: 1935–1975
- Publisher: Simon & Schuster
- Publication place: United States
- Pages: 13,549
- ISBN: 978-1567310238

The Story of Civilization (1935–1975), by husband and wife team Will Durant and Ariel Durant (known as "the Durants"), is an eleven-volume set of books covering both Eastern and Western civilizations for the general reader, with a particular emphasis on European (Western) history, written over a span of four decades.

== Background ==
The first six volumes of The Story of Civilization are credited to Will Durant alone, with Ariel recognized only in the acknowledgements. Beginning with The Age of Reason Begins, Ariel is credited as a co-author. In the preface to the first volume, Durant states his intention to make the series in five volumes, although this would not turn out to be the case.

The series won a Pulitzer Prize for General Nonfiction in 1968 with the tenth volume in the series, Rousseau and Revolution.

The volumes were best sellers and sold well for many years. Sets of them were frequently offered by book clubs. An unabridged audiobook production of all eleven volumes was produced by the Books on Tape company and was read by Alexander Adams (also known as Grover Gardner).

== Volumes ==
=== I. Our Oriental Heritage (1935) ===
This volume covers Near Eastern history until the fall of the Achaemenid Empire in the 330s BC, and the history of India, China, and Japan up to the 1930s.

Full title: The Story of Civilization ~ 1 ~ Our Oriental Heritage ~ Being a History of Civilization in Egypt and the Near East to the Death of Alexander; and in India, China and Japan from the Beginning to Our Own Day; with an Introduction on the Nature and Foundations of Civilization.

=== II. The Life of Greece (1939) ===
This volume covers Ancient Greece and the Hellenistic Near East down to the Roman conquest.

Full title: The Story of Civilization ~ 2 ~ The Life of Greece ~ A History of Greek Government, Industry, Manners, Morals, Religion, Philosophy, Science, Literature and Art from the Earliest Times to the Roman Conquest.

=== III. Caesar and Christ (1944) ===
The volume covers the history of Rome and of Christianity until the time of Constantine the Great.

Full title: The Story of Civilization ~ 3 ~ Caesar and Christ ~ This Brilliantly Written History Surveys All Aspects of Roman Life ~ Politics, Economics, Literature, Art, Morals. It Ends with the Conflict of Pagan and Christian Forces and Raises the Curtain on the Great Struggle between Church and State.

=== IV. The Age of Faith (1950) ===
This volume covers the Middle Ages in both Europe and the Near East, from the time of Constantine I to that of Dante Alighieri.

Full title: The Story of Civilization ~ 4 ~ The Age of Faith ~ A History of Medieval Civilization ~ Christian, Islamic, and Judaic ~ from Constantine to Dante ~ A.D. 325 - 1300.

=== V. The Renaissance (1953) ===
This volume covers the history of Italy from c.1300 to the mid 16th century, focusing on the Italian Renaissance.

Full title: The Story of Civilization ~ 5 ~ The Renaissance ~ A History of Civilization in Italy from the Birth of Petrarch to the Death of Titian ~ 1304 to 1576.

=== VI. The Reformation (1957) ===
This volume covers the history of Europe outside of Italy from around 1300 to 1564, focusing on the Protestant Reformation.

Full title: The Story of Civilization ~ 6 ~ The Reformation ~ A History of European Civilization from Wyclif to Calvin ~ 1300 - 1564.

=== VII. The Age of Reason Begins (1961) ===
This volume covers the history of Europe and the Near East from 1559 to 1648.

Full title: The Story of Civilization ~ 7 ~ The Age of Reason Begins ~ A History of European Civilization in the Period of Shakespeare, Bacon, Montaigne, Rembrandt, Galileo and Descartes ~ 1558 - 1648.

=== VIII. The Age of Louis XIV (1963) ===
This volume covers the period of King Louis XIV of France in Europe and the Near East.

Full title: The Story of Civilization ~ 8 ~ The Age of Louis XIV ~ A History of European Civilization in the Period of Pascal, Molière, Cromwell, Milton, Peter the Great, Newton and Spinoza: 1648-1715.

=== IX. The Age of Voltaire (1965) ===
This volume covers the period of the Age of Enlightenment, as exemplified by Voltaire, focusing on the period between 1715 and 1756 in France, Britain, and Germany.

Full title: The Story of Civilization ~ 9 ~ The Age of Voltaire ~ A History of Civilization in Western Europe from 1715 to 1756, with Special Emphasis on the Conflict between Religion and Philosophy.

=== X. Rousseau and Revolution (1967) ===
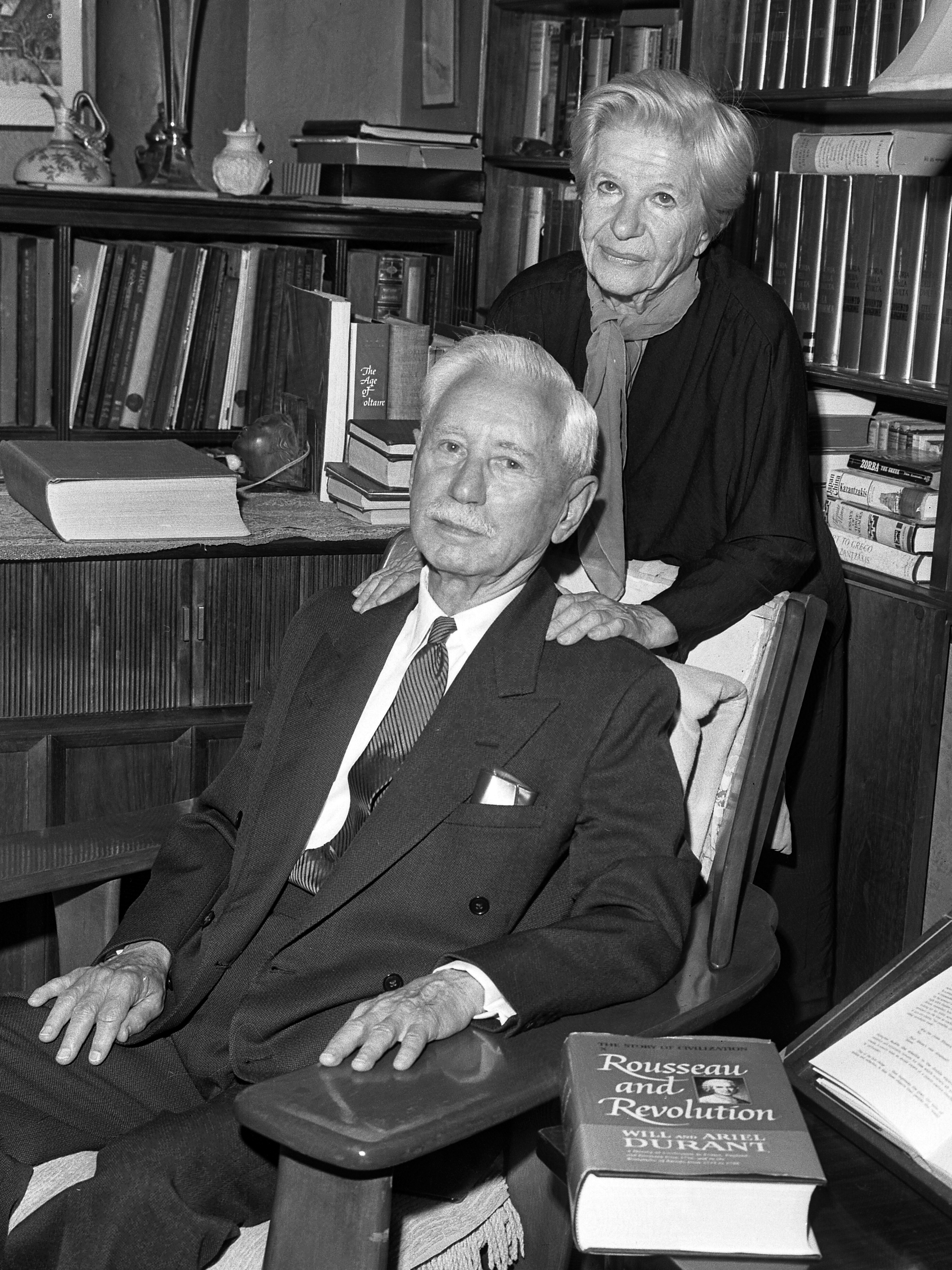
Ariel and Will Durant with a copy of Rousseau and Revolution (1967).

This volume centers on Jean-Jacques Rousseau and his times. It received the Pulitzer Prize for General Nonfiction in 1968.

The Durants originally expected Rousseau and Revolution to be the final volume of the series.

Full title: The Story of Civilization ~ 10 ~ Rousseau and Revolution ~ A History of Civilization in France, England, and Germany from 1756, and in the Remainder of Europe from 1715 to 1789.

=== XI. The Age of Napoleon (1975) ===
This volume centers on Napoleon I of France and his times.

After having previously concluded the series, the Durants decided to create a new volume after finding their initial retirement unfulfilling.

Full title: The Story of Civilization ~ 11 ~ The Age of Napoleon ~ A History of European Civilization from 1789 to 1815.

== Development history ==
Editors on the series included M. Lincoln ("Max") Schuster and Michael Korda.

== Reception ==
The tenth volume, Rousseau and Revolution, won the Pulitzer Prize for General Nonfiction in 1968.

All eleven volumes were Book-of-the-Month Club selections and best-sellers with total sales of more than two million copies in nine languages.

=== Reviews ===
James H. Breasted's review of the first volume (Our Oriental Heritage) was highly negative. W. N. Brown was hardly more impressed. Henry James Forman, reviewing for The New York Times, found the first volume to be a masterpiece, as did the New York Herald Tribune.

Michael Ginsberg was favorably disposed to the second volume (The Life of Greece), as was Edmund C. Richards. Reviews of the second volume from Time and Boston Evening Transcript were very positive.

J.W. Swain noted in reviewing the third volume (Caesar and Christ) that the book was written for a popular audience rather than scholars, and was successful at that. A review of the third volume in Time was positive. John Day published a mixed review of the third volume. Ralph Bates posted a negative review of the third volume for The New Republic.

Sidney R. Packard, professor emeritus of history at Smith College, found the fourth volume (The Age of Faith) to be quite good. Norman V. Hope had a similar impression. L.H. Carlson, for the Chicago Tribune, compared it to Jacob Burckhardt's works.

Wallace K. Ferguson published a review of the fifth volume (The Renaissance). Geoffrey Bruun published a positive review of the fifth volume for The New York Times.

Bruun also had a positive review of the sixth volume (The Reformation). Garrett Mattingly, for The Saturday Review, lambasted the sixth volume, but went on to say that Durant was widely-read and a capable storyteller.

D. W. Brogan had a highly favorable impression of the seventh volume (The Age of Reason Begins). A review in Time of the seventh volume was positive.

J.H. Plumb found the eighth volume (The Age of Louis XIV) to be very poor, as did Stanley Mellon.

Alfred J. Bingham found the ninth volume (The Age of Voltaire) to be a "thoroughly enjoyable semi-popular history".

Bingham was also effusive in his praise of the tenth volume (Rousseau and Revolution).

John H. Plumb was scathing in reviewing the eleventh volume (The Age of Napoleon). Joseph I. Shulim took a similar view. Alfred J. Bingham had a mixed yet favorable opinion. A review in The Saturday Review of the eleventh volume was, however, very positive.

== See also ==
- A Study of History
- The Cartoon History of the Universe
- Civilisation (TV series)
- The Outline of History
- The Rise of the West: A History of the Human Community
- The Story of Philosophy
- The Lessons of History
- The Decline of the West
