= Little Blue Book =

Series of books published from 1919 to 1978

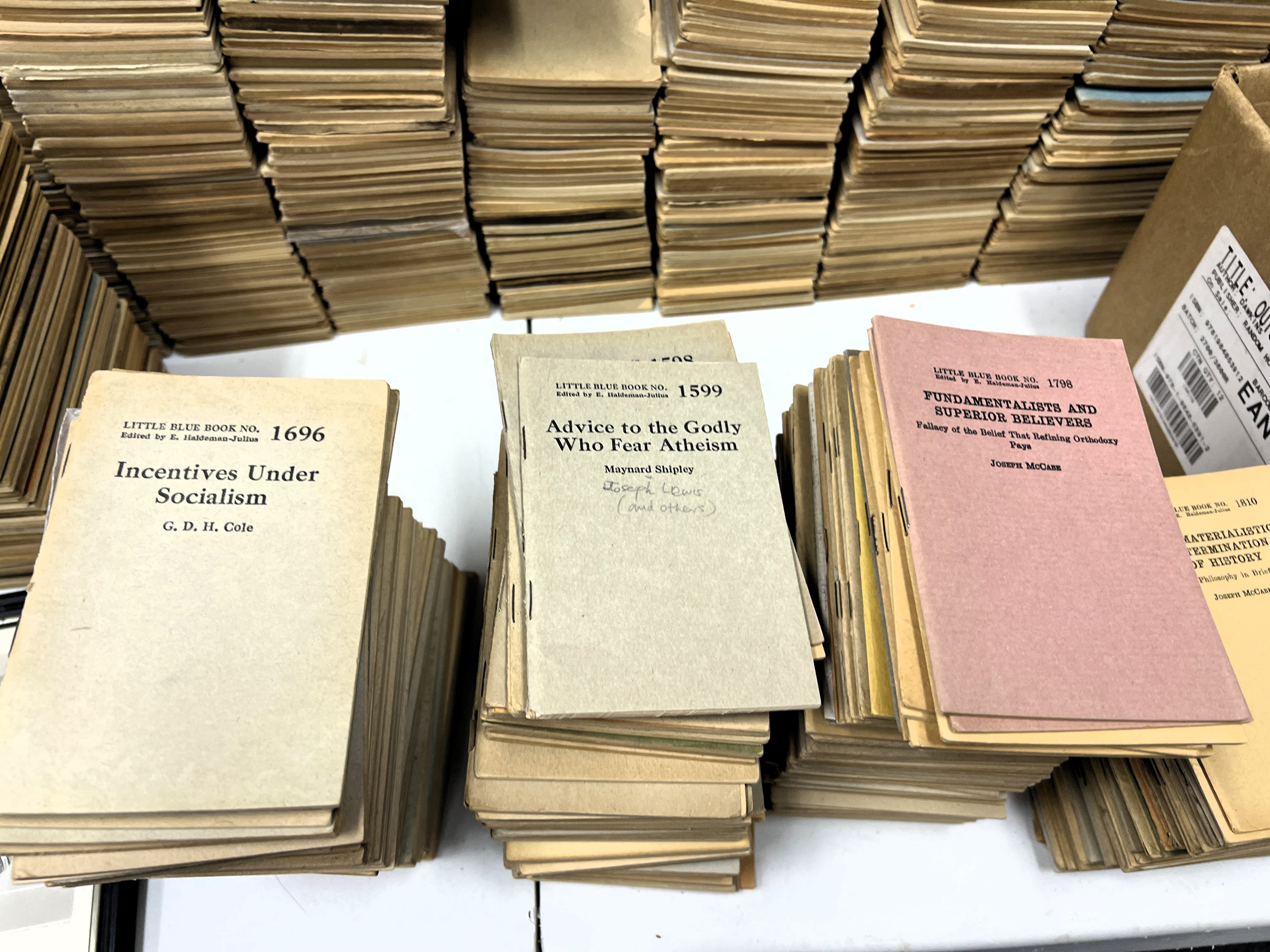
Little Blue Books at Center for Inquiry 2026

Little Blue Books are a series of small staple-bound books published from 1919 through 1978 by the Haldeman-Julius Publishing Company of Girard, Kansas. They were extremely popular, and achieved a total of 300-500 million booklets sold over the series' lifetime. A Big Blue Book range was also published.

== Origins ==
Emanuel Haldeman-Julius and his wife, Marcet, set out to publish small low price paperback pocketbooks that were intended to sweep the ranks of the working class as well as the "educated" class. Their goal was to get works of literature, a wide range of ideas, common sense knowledge and various points of view out to as large an audience as possible. These books, at approximately 3½ by 5 inches (9 by 13 cm) easily fit into a working man's back pocket or shirt pocket. The inspiration for the series were cheap 10-cent paperback editions of various expired copyright classic works that Haldeman-Julius had purchased as a 15-year-old (the Ballad of Reading Gaol being especially enthralling). He wrote:

It was winter, and I was cold, but I sat down on a bench and read that booklet straight through, without a halt, and never did I so much as notice that my hands were blue, that my wet nose was numb, and that my ears felt as hard as glass. Never until then, or since, did any piece of printed matter move me more deeply...I'd been lifted out of this world - and by a 10¢ booklet. I thought, at the moment, how wonderful it would be if thousands of such booklets could be made available.

In 1919 they purchased a publishing house in Girard, Kansas from their employer Appeal to Reason, a socialist weekly which had seen better days and that Haldeman-Julius edited. Though the Appeal to Reason was not the influential newspaper it had been, its printing presses (and more importantly the 175,000 names on its subscriber lists) would prove to be crucial. Before anything had even been printed, Haldeman-Julius asked Appeal to Reason's subscribers to send him an advance of $5; at 10 cents a pamphlet, he would then, at staggered intervals, send them 50 pamphlets which he would be able to print with the upfront money. Things went very well:

Five thousand readers took me up, which meant I had $25,000 to work with. I hurried through the 50 titles (and they were good ones, too, for I haven't believed in trash at any time in my life) and got many letters expressing satisfaction with the venture. Encouraged, I announced a second batch of 50 titles, and called for $5 subscriptions...Meanwhile, the booklets were selling well to readers who hadn't subscribed for batches of 50.

In 1919 they began printing these works at a rate of 24,000 a day in a series called Appeal's Pocket Series on cheap pulp paper, stapled and bound with a red stiff paper cover for 25 cents. The name changed over the first few years (as did the color of the binding), at times known as the People's Pocket Series, the Appeal Pocket Series, the Ten Cent Pocket Series, the Five Cent Pocket Series, and finally the one that took, Little Blue Books in 1923. The price remained at 5¢ a copy for many years.

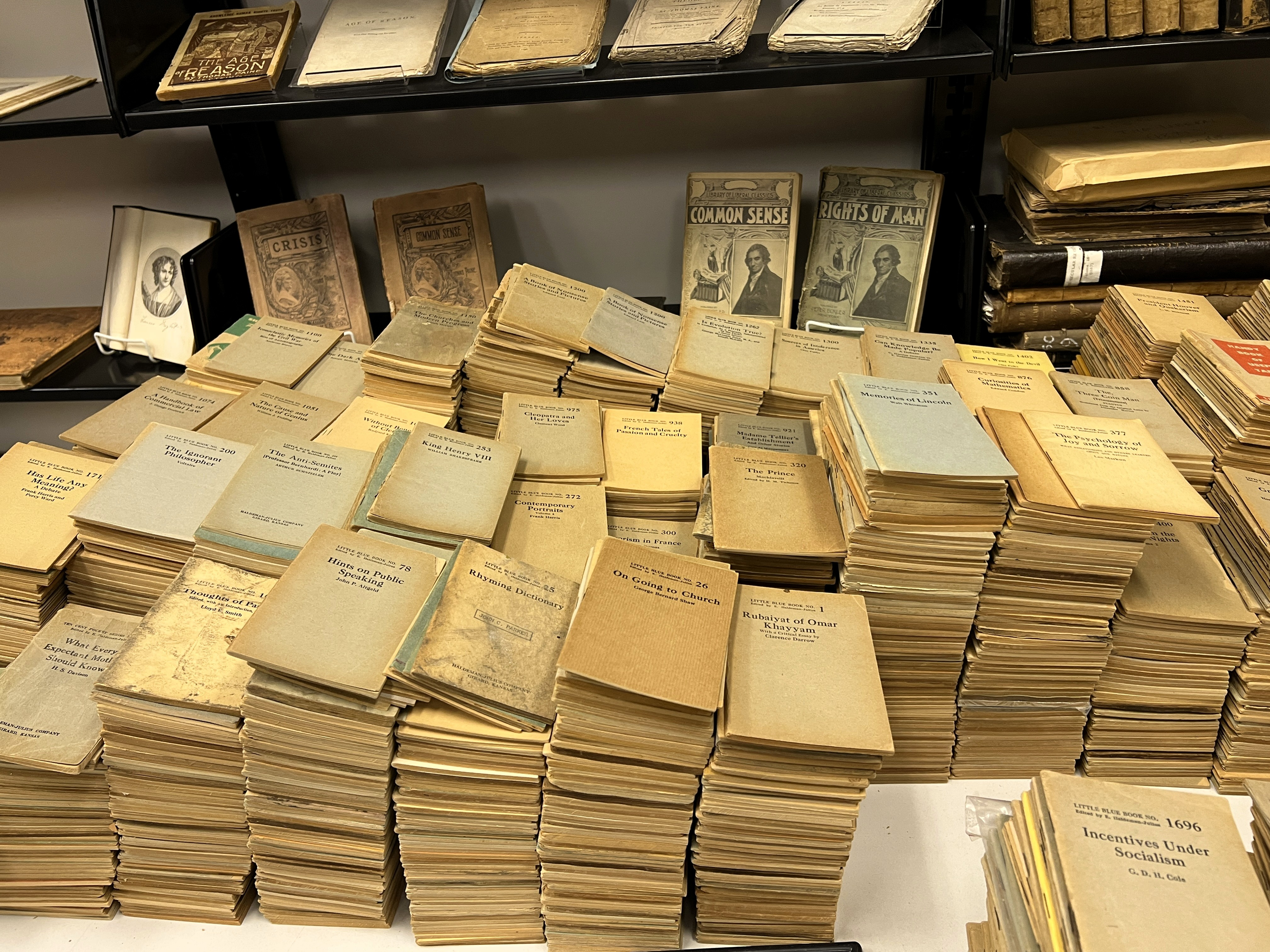
Little Blue Books at Center for Inquiry 2026

== Popularity ==
In just nine years the idea caught on all around the globe as the Little Blue Books were finding their ways into the pockets of laborers, scholars, and the average citizen. The St. Louis Dispatch called Haldeman-Julius "the Henry Ford of literature". Among the better known names of the day to support the Little Blue Books were Emperor Haile Selassie of Ethiopia, W. E. B. Du Bois, Admiral Richard Byrd, who took along a set to the South Pole, and Franklin P. Adams of Information, Please!

Most were sold by mail order and promoted through sensationalistic advertisements (e.g. “At last! Books are cheaper than hamburgers!”) in newspapers and magazines such as Life, Popular Science, and Ladies’ Home Journal. To save ad space, only the book titles were listed, organized by topic headings such as “Philosophy,” “How-To,” or “Sex.” Many classics were cut down to fit the publishing requirements, which Haldeman-Julius justified as "boring text", pioneering the concept later used by Reader's Digest. A pioneer in guerrilla marketing, Haldeman-Julius sold his books not only in bookstores but everywhere he could reach the consumer, including drugstores, toy stores, even his own line of vending machines. Mail-order customers checked-off the titles they wanted and mailed in the order form, with $1 (20 books) being the minimum order. Many bookstores kept a book rack stocked with many Little Blue Book titles. Their small size and low price made them especially popular with travelers and transient working people.

If a book sold less than 10,000 copies in one year, Haldeman-Julius would remove it from his line, but usually only after trying a new title, often creating a hit. For instance, "The Tallow Ball" by Guy de Maupassant sold 15,000 copies one year, but 54,700 the next year after the title was changed to "A French Prostitute's Sacrifice".

Many famous people grew up on Little Blue Books. Louis L'Amour cites them as a major source of his own early reading in his autobiography Education of a Wandering Man. Other writers who recall reading the series in their youth include Saul Bellow, Harlan Ellison, Jack Conroy, Ralph Ellison, William S. Burroughs and Studs Terkel.

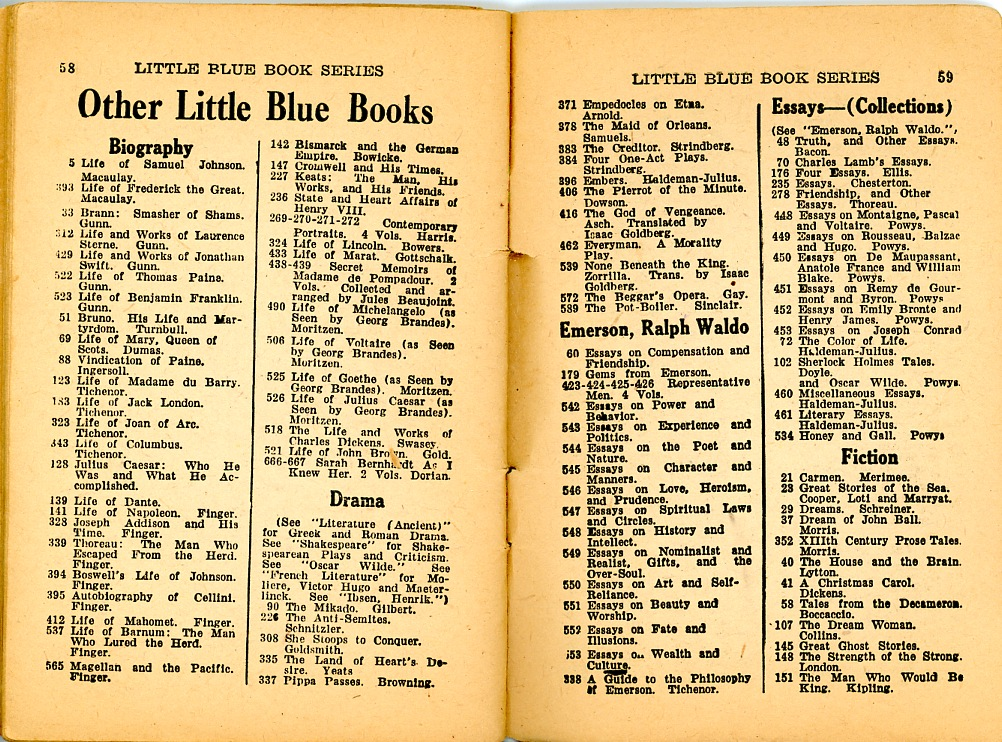
"Other Little Blue Books" - list of topics and titles published in a Little Blue Book

The works covered were frequently classics of Western literature. Goethe and Shakespeare were well represented, as were the works of the Ancient Greeks, and more modern writers like Voltaire, Émile Zola, H. G. Wells. Some of the topics the Little Blue Books covered were on the cutting edge of societal norms. Alongside books on making candy (#518 - "How to Make All Kinds of Candy" by Helene Paquin) and classic literature (#246 - Hamlet by William Shakespeare) were ones exploring same-sex love (#692 - "Homo-Sexual Life" by William J Fielding) and agnostic viewpoints (#1500 - "Why I Am an Agnostic: Including Expressions of Faith from a Protestant a Catholic and a Jew" by Clarence Darrow). Shorter works from many popular authors such as Jack London and Henry David Thoreau were published, as were a number of anti-religious tracts written by Robert Ingersoll, ex-Catholic priest Joseph McCabe, and Haldeman-Julius himself. A young Will Durant wrote a series of Blue Books on philosophy which were republished in 1926 by Simon & Schuster as The Story of Philosophy, a popular work that remains in print today.

== Decline in popularity ==
Demand for existing titles remained steady throughout the Depression although only about 300 new titles were released during the 1930s, the bulk appearing prior to 1932. Following World War II, the FBI under J. Edgar Hoover viewed the Little Blue Books' inclusion of such subjects as socialism, atheism, and frank treatment of sexuality as a threat and put Haldeman-Julius on their enemies list, getting him convicted of income tax evasion. This persecution caused a rapid decline in the number of bookstores carrying the Little Blue Books, and they slowly sank into obscurity by the 1950s, although still well remembered by older people who had read them in the 1920s and 1930s. The Cardinal Francis Spellman FBI file contains clear indications concerning the interest of the FBI on Haldeman-Julius Publications by 1955, after an anonymous letter in late 1954 alerted the government to a book that was under press "vilifying" the Cardinal.

At the time of Emanuel Haldeman-Julius's death on July 31, 1951, the series supported 1873 active titles. The works continued to be reprinted until the Girard printing plant and warehouse was destroyed by fire in 1978 with 1914 total titles published. In the 1950s the San Diego, California-based atheist-Freethinker publication The Truth Seeker bought out most of their supply and raised prices.

Collections of the series are housed in the libraries at Pittsburg State University, Kent State University, Bowling Green State University, California State University, Northridge and Center for Inquiry library
