= Big Blue Book =

Big Blue Books are a series of small staple-bound books published from 1925 to 1950 by the Haldeman-Julius Publishing Company of Girard, Kansas (1919–1978), larger than the Little Blue Books. The series included both reprints and first publications, the latter including An Outline of Intellectual Rubbish by Bertrand Russell.
