= The Story of Philosophy =

1926 book by Will Durant

- The Story of Philosophy by Will Durant
- Author: Will Durant
- Language: English
- Subject: Philosophy
- Published: March 17, 1926 (Simon & Schuster)
- Publication place: United States
- ISBN: 978-0671739164

The Story of Philosophy: The Lives and Opinions of the Greater Philosophers is a 1926 book by Will Durant, in which he profiles several prominent Western philosophers and their ideas, beginning with Socrates and Plato and on through Friedrich Nietzsche. Durant attempts to show the interconnection of their ideas and how one philosopher's ideas informed the next.

There are nine chapters each focused on one philosopher, and two more chapters each containing briefer profiles of three early 20th century philosophers.

The book was published in 1926, with a revised second edition released in 1933. The work was preceded by a number of pamphlets in the Little Blue Books series of inexpensive worker education pamphlets. They proved so popular they were assembled into a single book and published in hardcover form by Simon & Schuster in 1926.

Philosophers profiled are, in order: Plato (with a section on Socrates), Aristotle, Francis Bacon, Baruch Spinoza (with a section on Descartes), Voltaire (with a section on Rousseau), Immanuel Kant (with a section on Hegel), Arthur Schopenhauer, Herbert Spencer, and Friedrich Nietzsche.

The final two chapters are devoted to European and then American philosophers. Henri Bergson, Benedetto Croce, and Bertrand Russell are covered in the tenth, and George Santayana, William James, and John Dewey are covered in the eleventh.

In a foreword to the readers in the second edition of the book, Durant expresses his acknowledgement for the criticism that the book received as to how it does not include philosophers from the Asian continent, most notably Confucius, Buddha and Adi Shankara.

This work is the source of the popular quote, typically misattributed to Aristotle: "We are what we repeatedly do. Excellence, then, is not an act, but a habit.” The phrase was originated by Durant when discussing Aristotle's work.

== Publication data ==
- Will Durant, The Story of Philosophy: the Lives and Opinions of the Greater Philosophers (1926) New York: Simon & Schuster, revised edition 1933
  - 1962 Time Reading Program Special Edition (Time, Inc., New York)
  - 1967 Touchstone paperback: ISBN 0-671-20159-X
  - 1983 Simon and Schuster paperback (out of print): ISBN 0-671-69500-2
  - 1991 Pocketbooks mass market paperback: ISBN 0-671-73916-6
  - 1999 Tandem Library binding: ISBN 0-8085-7769-7
