= Will Durant =

American historian, philosopher and writer (1885–1981)

William Durant
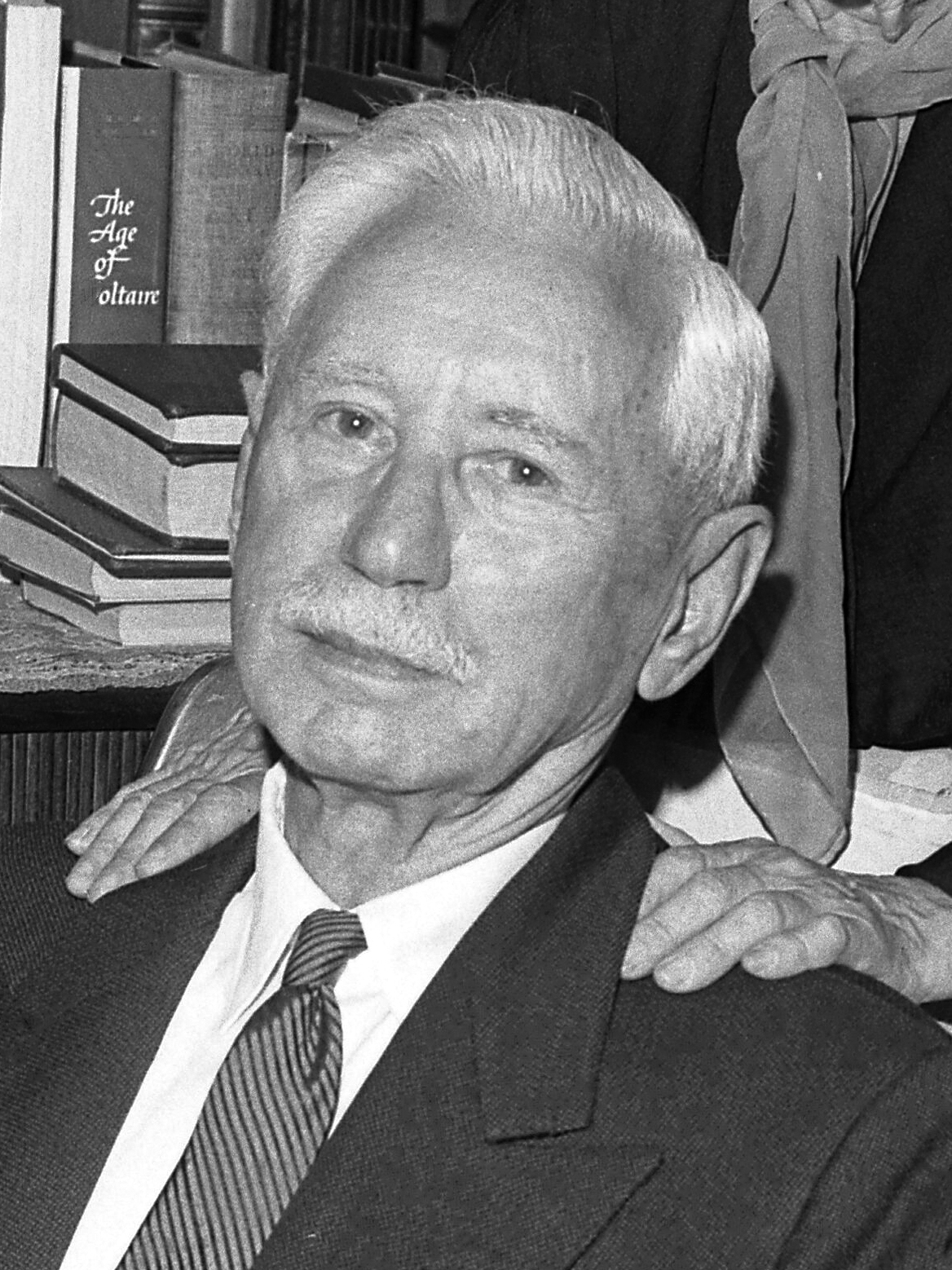
- Durant in 1967
- Born: November 5, 1885; North Adams, Massachusetts, U.S.
- Died: November 7, 1981 (aged 96); Los Angeles, California, U.S.
- Resting place: Westwood Village Memorial Park Cemetery
- Education: Saint Peter's College (BA, 1907); Columbia University (PhD, 1917)
- Occupations: Historian; writer; philosopher; teacher
- Spouse: Ariel Kaufman Durant (m. 1913; died 1981)
- Children: Ethel Durant
- Writing career
- Genre: Non-fiction
- Subjects: History, philosophy, religion

William James Durant (/dəˈrænt/; November 5, 1885 – November 7, 1981) was an American historian and philosopher, best known for his eleven-volume work, The Story of Civilization, which contains and details the history of Eastern and Western civilizations. It was written in collaboration with his wife, Ariel Durant, and published between 1935 and 1975. He was earlier noted for The Story of Philosophy (1926), described as "a groundbreaking work that helped to popularize philosophy".

Durant conceived of philosophy as total perspective or seeing things sub specie totius (i.e., "from the perspective of the whole")—a phrase inspired by Spinoza's sub specie aeternitatis, roughly meaning "from the perspective of the eternal". He sought to unify and humanize the great body of historical knowledge, which had grown voluminous and become fragmented into esoteric specialties, and to vitalize it for contemporary application. As a result of their success, he and his wife were jointly awarded the Pulitzer Prize for General Nonfiction in 1968 and the Presidential Medal of Freedom in 1977.

== Early life ==
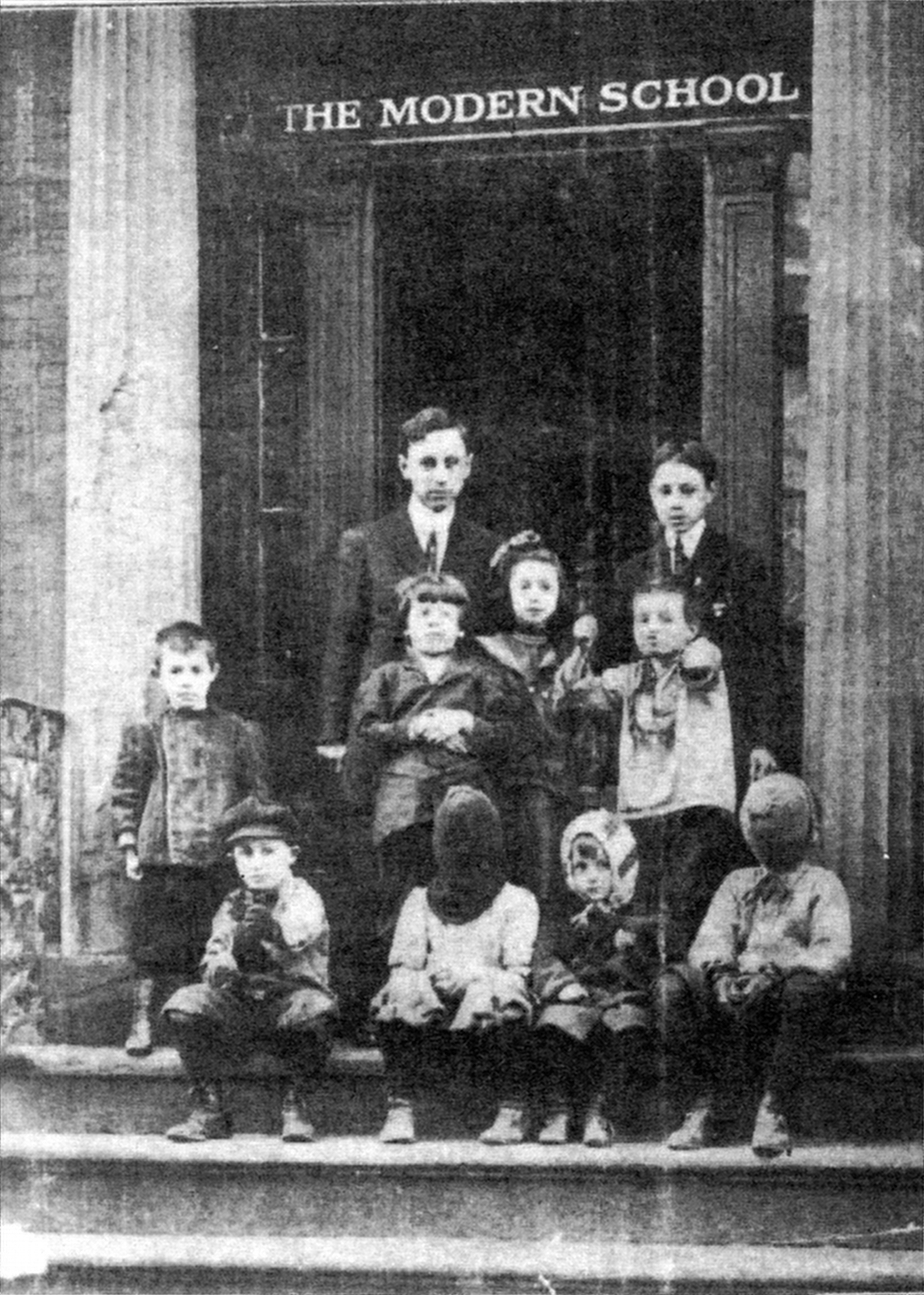
The Modern School in New York City, circa 1911–12. Will Durant stands with his pupils. This image was used on the cover of the first Modern School magazine.

William James Durant was born in North Adams, Massachusetts, to French-Canadian Catholic parents, Joseph Durant and Mary Allard, who had been part of the Quebec emigration to the United States.

After graduating from St. Peter's Preparatory School in Jersey City, New Jersey, in 1903, Durant enrolled at Saint Peter's College (now Saint Peter's University), also in Jersey City, where he graduated in 1907. Historian Joan Rubin writes of that period, "Despite some adolescent flirtations, he began preparing for the vocation that promised to realize his mother's fondest hopes for him: the priesthood. In that way, one might argue, he embarked on a course that, while distant from Yale's or Columbia's apprenticeships in gentility, offered equivalent cultural authority within his own milieu."

In 1905, he began experimenting with socialist philosophy, but, after World War I, he began recognizing that a "lust for power" underlie all forms of political behavior. However, even before the war, "other aspects of his sensibility had competed with his radical leanings," notes Rubin. She adds that "the most concrete of those was a persistent penchant for philosophy. With his energy invested in Baruch Spinoza, he made little room for the Russian anarchist Mikhail Bakunin. From then on, writes Rubin, "his retention of a model of selfhood predicated on discipline made him unsympathetic to anarchist injunctions to 'be yourself.'... To be one's 'deliberate self,' he explained, meant to 'rise above' the impulse to 'become the slaves of our passions' and instead to act with 'courageous devotion' to a moral cause."

== Teaching career ==
From 1907 to 1911, Durant taught Latin and French at Seton Hall College in South Orange, New Jersey.

After leaving Seton Hall, Durant was a teacher at Ferrer Modern School from 1911 to 1913. Ferrer was "an experiment in libertarian education," according to the Who's Who of Pulitzer Prize Winners. Alden Freeman, a supporter of the Ferrer Modern School, sponsored him for a tour of Europe.

In 1913, he resigned his post as teacher and married the 15-year-old Ariel Kaufman; they had one daughter, Ethel, and a "foster" son, Louis, whose mother was Flora—Ariel's sister. To support themselves, he began lecturing in a Presbyterian church for $5 and $10; the material for the lectures became the starting point for The Story of Civilization.

By 1914, he began to reject "intimations of human evil," notes Rubin, and to "retreat from radical social change." She summarizes the changes in his overall philosophy:

Instead of tying human progress to the rise of the proletariat, he made it the inevitable outcome of the laughter of young children or the endurance of his parents' marriage. As Ariel later summarized it, he had concocted, by his mid-30s, "that sentimental, idealizing blend of love, philosophy, Christianity, and socialism which dominated his spiritual chemistry" the rest of his life. The attributes ultimately propelled him away from radicalism as a substitute faith and from teaching young anarchists as an alternative vocation. Instead, late in 1913 he embarked on a different pursuit: the dissemination of culture.

Durant was director and lecturer at the Labor Temple School in New York City from 1914 to 1927 while pursuing a PhD at Columbia University that he completed in 1917, the year he also served as an instructor in philosophy.

== Writing career ==
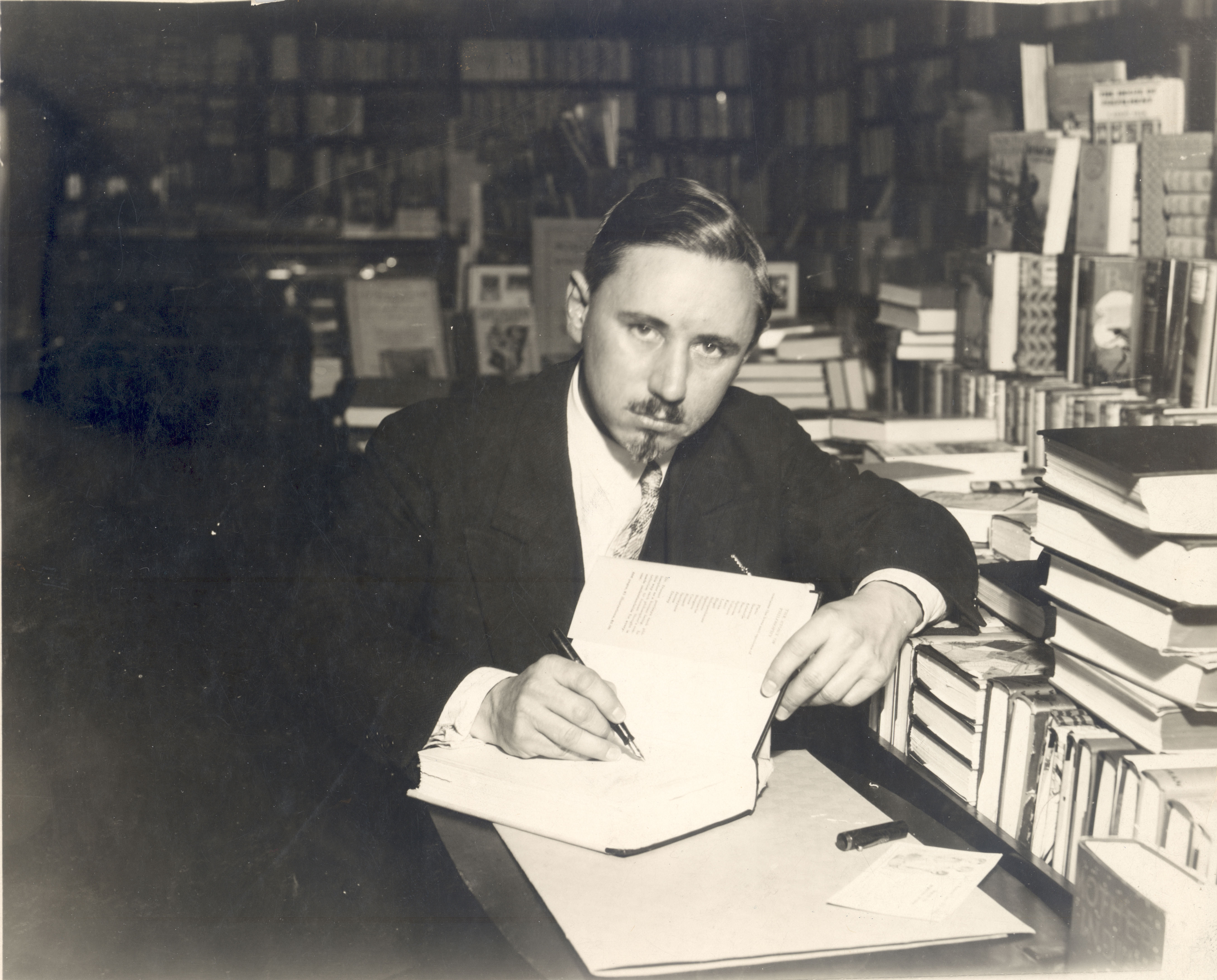
Durant signing a copy of The Story of Philosophy in Michigan, 1929

In 1908, Durant worked as a reporter for Arthur Brisbane's New York Evening Journal. At the Evening Journal, he wrote several articles on sexual criminals.

In 1917, while working on a doctorate in philosophy at Columbia University, he wrote his first book, Philosophy and the Social Problem. He discussed the idea that philosophy had not grown because it had refused to confront the actual problems of society. He received his doctorate from Columbia that same year. He was also an instructor at the university.

=== The Story of Philosophy ===
The Story of Philosophy originated as a series of Little Blue Books (educational pamphlets aimed at workers) and because it was so popular, it was republished as a hardcover book by Simon & Schuster in 1926 and became a bestseller, giving the Durants the financial independence that allowed them to travel the world several times and spend four decades writing The Story of Civilization. Will left teaching and began work on the 11-volume Story of Civilization.

=== The Story of Civilization ===
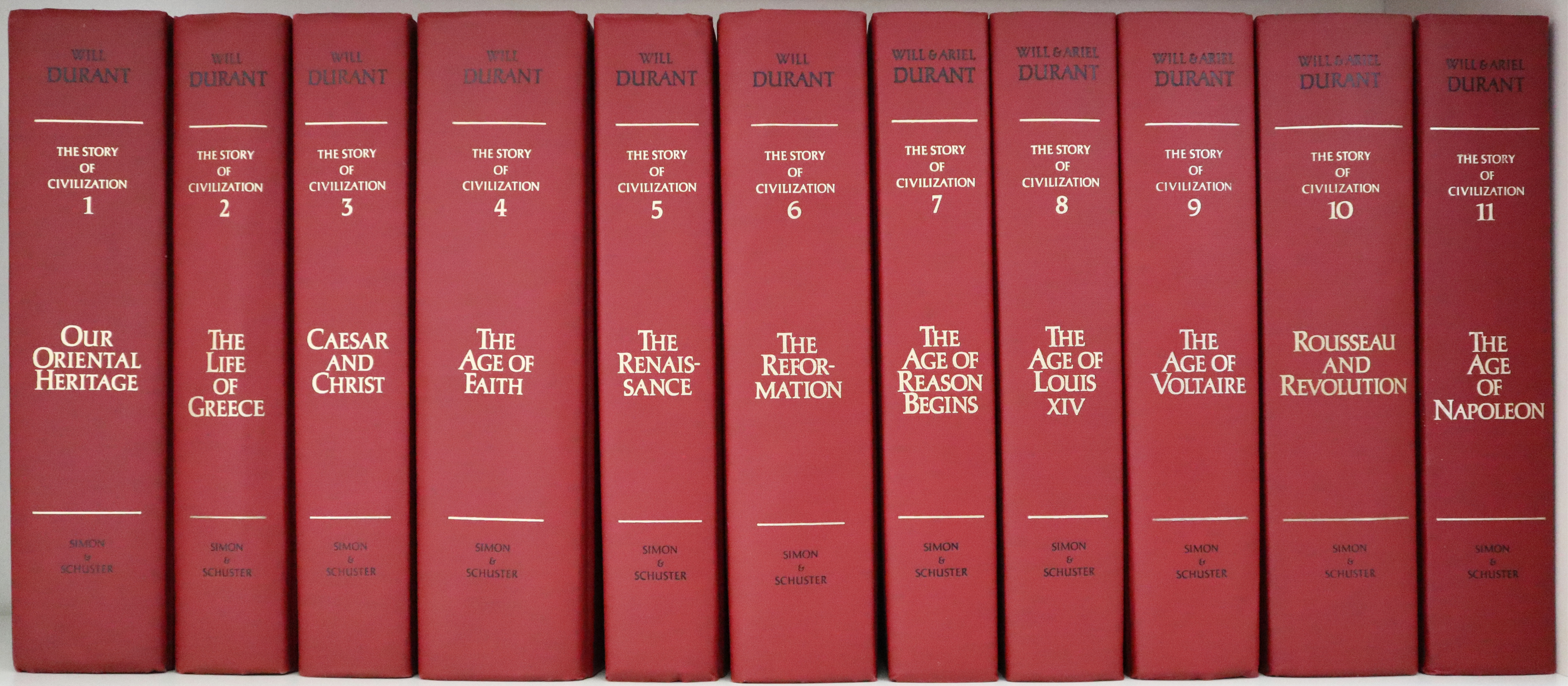
The 11 volumes of The Story of Civilization

Throughout their writing of The Story of Civilization, the Durants strove to create what they called "integral history" and resisted a "specialized" approach to history. Their goal was to write a biography of a civilization, in this case, the history of the West; not only would it describe the usual history of the Western world's wars, the history of politics and biographies of people of greatness and villainy, but also the history of the Western world's culture, art, philosophy, religion, and the rise of mass communication. Much of The Story considers the living conditions of everyday people throughout the 2500-year period that their "story" of the West covers, and bring an unabashedly moral framework to their accounts. In the 1990s, an unabridged audiobook production of all 11 volumes was produced by Books On Tape, read by Grover Gardner (under the alias Alexander Adams).

The Durants were awarded the 1968 Pulitzer Prize for General Nonfiction for Rousseau and Revolution (1967), the 10th volume of The Story of Civilization. In 1976, the Durants received the Golden Plate Award of the American Academy of Achievement. In 1977, President Gerald Ford awarded each the Presidential Medal of Freedom.

=== Other works ===
A copy of the Durant Declaration of INTERdependence

On April 8, 1944, Durant was approached by two leaders of the Jewish and Christian faiths, Meyer David and Christian Richard, about starting "a movement, to raise moral standards." He suggested instead that they start a movement against racial intolerance and outlined his ideas for a "Declaration of Interdependence". The movement for the declaration, Declaration of INTERdependence, Inc., was launched at a gala dinner at the Hollywood Roosevelt Hotel on March 22, 1945, attended by over 400 people including Thomas Mann and Bette Davis. The Declaration was read into the Congressional Record on October 1, 1945, by Ellis E. Patterson. (Note: Other sources say it was in 1949.)

Throughout his career, Durant made several speeches, including "Persia in the History of Civilization", which was presented as an address before the Iran-America Society in Tehran, Iran, on April 21, 1948, and it had been intended for inclusion in the Bulletin of the Asia Institute (formerly, the Bulletin of the American Institute for Persian, then Iranian, Art and Archaeology), Vol. VII, no. 2, which never saw publication.

Rousseau and Revolution was followed by a slender volume of observations which was titled The Lessons of History, which was both a synopsis of the series as well as an analysis of human history.

Though Ariel and Will had intended to carry the work on The Story of Civilization into the 20th century, at their now very advanced age, they expected the 10th volume to be their last. However, they went on to publish a final volume, their 11th, The Age of Napoleon in 1975. They also left notes behind for a 12th volume, The Age of Darwin, as well as an outline of a 13th volume, The Age of Einstein, which would have taken The Story of Civilization to 1945.

Three posthumous works by Durant have been published in recent years, The Greatest Minds and Ideas of All Time (2002), Heroes of History: A Brief History of Civilization from Ancient Times to the Dawn of the Modern Age (2001) and Fallen Leaves (2014).

==== Final years ====
The Durants shared an intense love for one another as they explained in their Dual Autobiography. After Will entered the hospital, Ariel stopped eating, and she died on October 25, 1981. Though their daughter, Ethel, and their grandchildren strove to conceal the news of Ariel's death from the ailing Will, he found out that she had died while he was watching the evening news, and he died two weeks later, two days after his 96th birthday, on November 7, 1981. Will was buried beside Ariel in the Westwood Village Memorial Park Cemetery, in Los Angeles.

=== Writing about Russia ===
In 1933, he published Tragedy of Russia: Impressions from a Brief Visit and soon afterward, he published The Lesson of Russia. A few years after the books were published, the social commentator Will Rogers read them and he described a symposium which he had attended which included Durant as one of the contributors to it. He later wrote of Durant, "He is just about our best writer on Russia. He is the most fearless writer that has been there. He tells you just what it's like. He makes a mighty fine talk. One of the most interesting lecturers we have, and a fine fellow."

=== Writing about India ===
In 1930, Durant visited British India to collect information for The Story of Civilization. While in India, Durant was shocked by the poverty and instances of starvation he witnessed, to the point where he took a period of time off from his intended goal to write a short book titled The Case for India about the "conscious and deliberate bleeding of India" by Britain. He also stated that "I began to feel that I had come upon the greatest crime in all history." when learning of the plight of India. In The Case for India, Durant wrote that "The British conquest of India was the invasion and destruction of a high civilization by a trading company utterly without scruple or principle, careless of art and greedy of gain, over-running with fire and sword a country temporarily disordered and helpless, bribing and murdering, annexing and stealing, and beginning their career of illegal and 'legal' plunder which has now gone on ruthlessly for one hundred and seventy-three years."

== Personal views ==
On his personal religious beliefs, Durant wrote that "I am prepared to have you put me down as an atheist, since I have reluctantly abandoned belief in a personal and loving God. But I am loath to leave the word God out of my life and creed," adding that he was "a Christian in the literal and difficult sense of sincerely admiring the personality of Christ and making a persistent effort to behave like a Christian."

== Reception ==
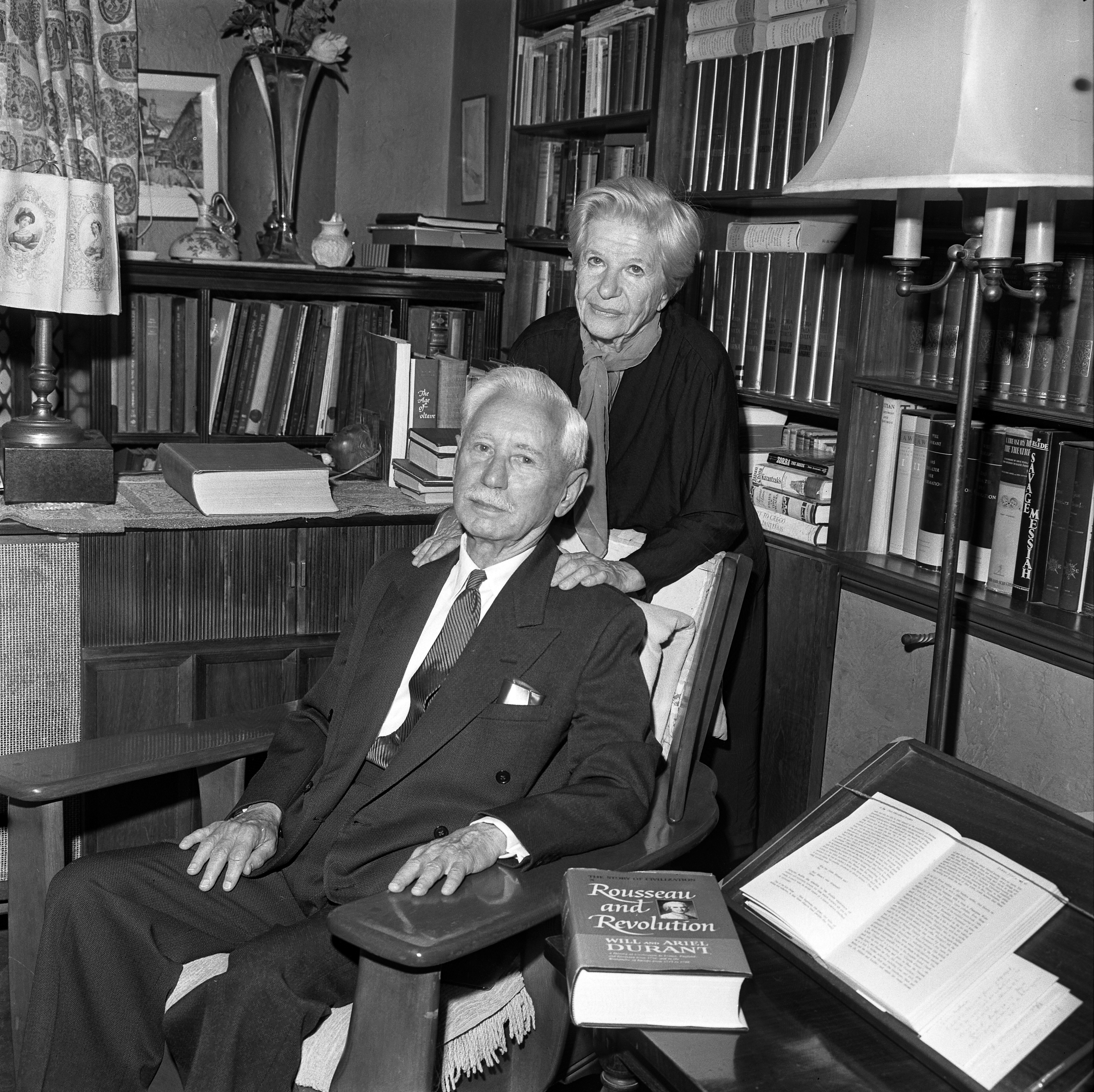
Ariel and Will Durant in the library of their home in Los Angeles, 1967

While Durant's work was well received by popular audiences, and The Story of Civilization sold in vast quantities, thanks in part to its inclusion in the Book of the Month Club, academic reception of his work was more critical: the Classics scholar Moses Finley criticized Durant's The Life of Greece on a number of grounds, including the book's racial essentialism and support for the great man theory of history.

== Selected bibliography ==
Will Durant's full bibliography can be found online.

- 1917. Philosophy and the Social Problem. New York: Macmillan.
- 1926. The Story of Philosophy. New York: Simon & Schuster.
- 1927. Transition; a sentimental story of one mind and one era . New York: Simon & Schuster.
- 1929. The Mansions of Philosophy. New York: Simon & Schuster.
- 1930. The Case for India. New York: Simon & Schuster.
- 1931. A Program for America. New York: Simon & Schuster.
- 1931. Adventures in Genius. New York: Simon & Schuster.
- 1932. On the Meaning of Life. New York: Ray Long and Richard R. Smith.
- 1933. The Tragedy of Russia: Impressions From a Brief Visit. New York: Simon & Schuster.
- 1936. The Foundations of Civilisation. New York: Simon & Schuster.
- 1953. The Pleasures of Philosophy. New York: Simon & Schuster.
- 1968. (with Ariel Durant) The Lessons of History. New York: Simon & Schuster.
- 1970. (with Ariel Durant) Interpretations of Life. New York: Simon & Schuster.
- 1977. (with Ariel Durant) A Dual Autobiography. New York: Simon & Schuster.
- 2001. Heroes of History: A Brief History of Civilization from Ancient Times to the Dawn of the Modern Age. New York: Simon & Schuster.
- 2002. The Greatest Minds and Ideas of All Time. New York: Simon & Schuster.
- 2003. An Invitation to Philosophy: Essays and Talks on the Love of Wisdom. Promethean Press.
- 2008. Adventures in Philosophy. Promethean Press.
- 2014. Fallen Leaves. New York: Simon & Schuster.

=== Little Blue Books contributions ===
- 1922. A Guide to Plato. Little Blue Book #159 Girard, Kansas: Haldeman-Julius Company.
- 1922. The Story of Aristotle's Philosophy. Little Blue Book #39 Girard, Kansas: Haldeman-Julius Company.
- 1923. The story of Francis Bacon's philosophy . Little Blue Book #443 Girard, Kansas: Haldeman-Julius Company.
- 1924: A Guide to Schopenhauer. Little Blue Book #700 Girard, Kansas: Haldeman-Julius Company.
- 1924. A Guide to Spinoza. Girard, Kansas: Haldeman-Julius Company.
- 1924. The Philosophy of Immanuel Kant. Little Blue Book #641 Girard, Kansas: Haldeman-Julius Company.
- 1924. The Story of Friedrich Nietzsche's Philosophy. Girard, Kansas: Haldeman-Julius Company.
- 1924. Voltaire and the French Enlightenment. Little Blue Book #512 Girard, Kansas: Haldeman-Julius Company.
- 1925. Anatole France: The Man and His Work. Little Blue Book #839 Girard, Kansas: Haldeman-Julius Company.
- 1925. Contemporary American Philosophers: Santayana, James and Dewey. Little Blue Book #813 Girard, Kansas: Haldeman-Julius Company.
- 1925. Contemporary European Philosophers: Bergson, Croce and Bertrand Russell. Little Blue Book #802 Girard, Kansas: Haldeman-Julius Company.
- 1925. The Philosophy of Herbert Spencer. Little Blue Book #772 Girard, Kansas: Haldeman-Julius Company.
- 1928. (with Clarence Darrow) Are We Machines? Little Blue Book #509 Girard, Kansas: Haldeman-Julius Company.

=== The Story of Civilization ===
- 1935. Our Oriental Heritage. New York: Simon & Schuster.
- 1939. The Life of Greece. New York: Simon & Schuster.
- 1944. Caesar and Christ. New York: Simon & Schuster.
- 1950. The Age of Faith. New York: Simon & Schuster.
- 1953. The Renaissance. New York: Simon & Schuster.
- 1957. The Reformation. New York: Simon & Schuster.
- 1961. (with Ariel Durant) The Age of Reason Begins. New York: Simon & Schuster.
- 1963. (with Ariel Durant) The Age of Louis XIV. New York: Simon & Schuster.
- 1965. (with Ariel Durant) The Age of Voltaire. New York: Simon & Schuster.
- 1967. (with Ariel Durant) Rousseau and Revolution. New York: Simon & Schuster.
- 1975. (with Ariel Durant) The Age of Napoleon. New York: Simon & Schuster.
