= E. Haldeman-Julius =

American writer and publisher (1889–1951)

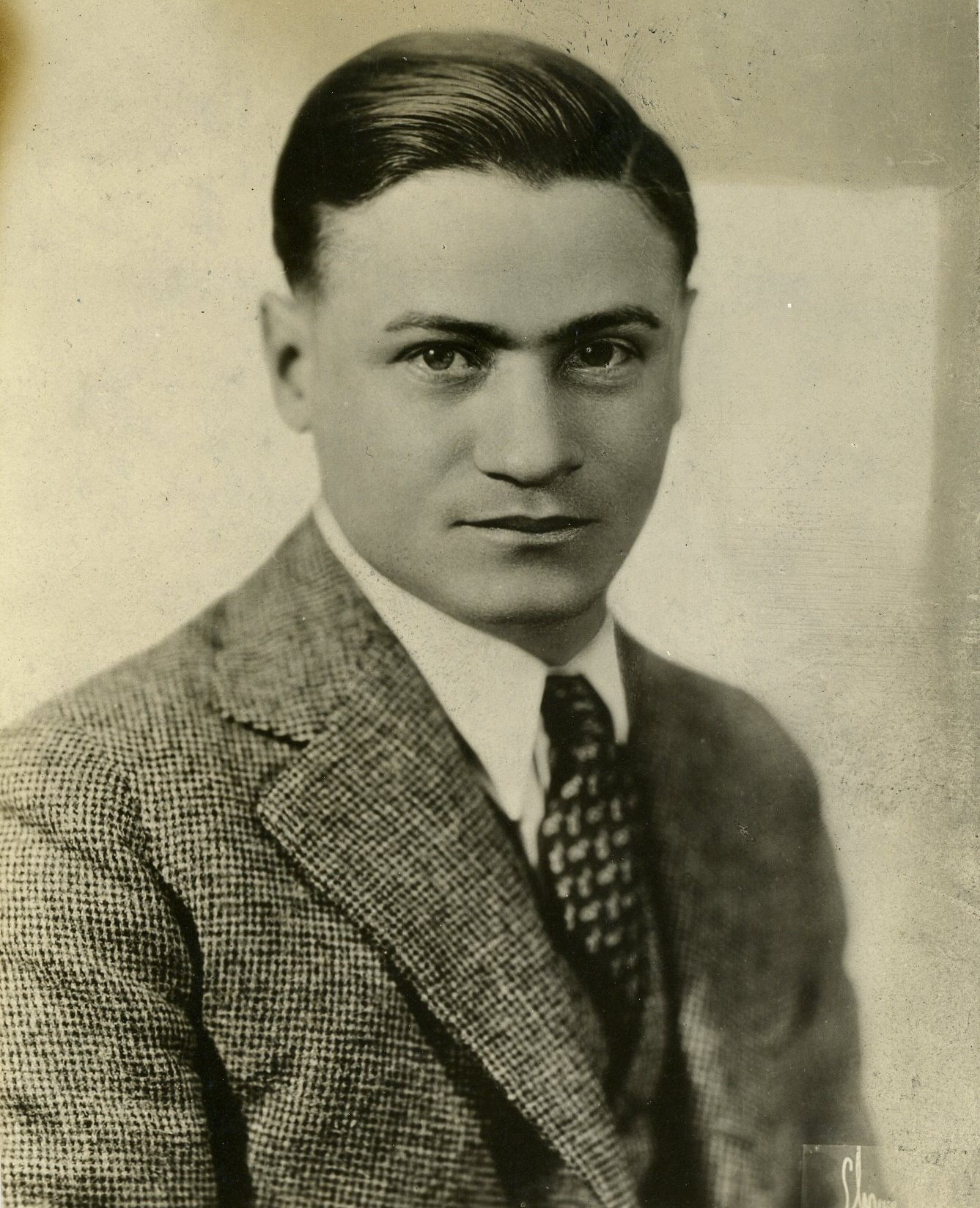
- Born: July 30, 1889; Philadelphia, Pennsylvania
- Died: July 31, 1951 (aged 62); Girard, Kansas
- Occupations: Publisher, writer
- Spouse(s): Anna Marcet Haldeman; Susan Haney
- Children: 3

Emanuel Haldeman-Julius (né Emanuel Julius) (July 30, 1889 – July 31, 1951) was a Jewish-American socialist writer, atheist thinker, social reformer and publisher. He is best remembered as the head of Haldeman-Julius Publications, the creator of a series of pamphlets known as "Little Blue Books," total sales of which ran into the hundreds of millions of copies.

== Biography ==
=== Early years ===
Emanuel Julius was born July 30, 1889, in Philadelphia, Pennsylvania, the son of David Julius (né Zolajefsky), a bookbinder. His parents were Jewish emigrants who fled Odessa (then part of the Russian Empire) and emigrated to America to escape religious persecution. His paternal and maternal grandfathers had both been rabbis but his own parents were not religious. "[T]hey were indifferent, for which I thank them."

As a boy, Emanuel read voraciously. Literature and pamphlets produced by the socialists were inexpensive; Julius read them and was convinced by their arguments. As he put it in 1913, "Only four years ago, I was a factory hand — slaving away in a textile mill in Philadelphia. I came upon the philosophy of Socialism and it put a new spirit into me. It lifted me out of the depths and pointed the way to something higher. I commenced to crave for expression. I felt that I have something to say. So, I scribbled things down. And, to my surprise, Socialist editors gave me a little encouragement." He joined the Socialist Party before World War I and was the party's 1932 Senatorial candidate for the state of Kansas.

=== Career ===
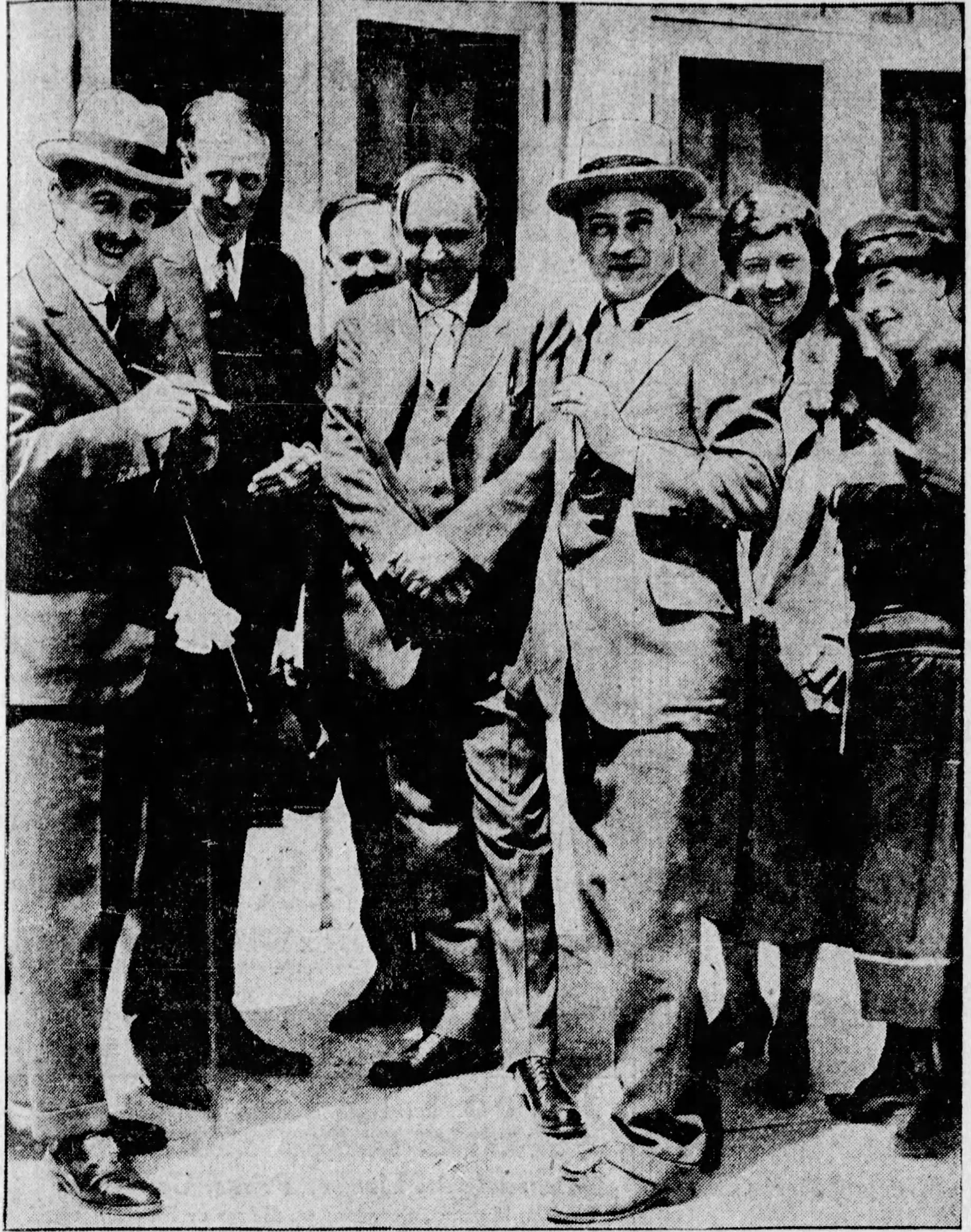
Haldeman-Julius on May 16, 1926. From left to right: Gilbert Frankau, Sinclair Lewis, Leon Milton Birkhead, Clarence Darrow, Haldeman-Julius, Birkhead's wife, and Darrow's wife.

After working for various newspapers, Julius rose to particular prominence as an editor (1915–1922) of the Appeal to Reason, a socialist newspaper with a large but declining national circulation. He and his first wife, Marcet Haldeman (whose last name he adopted in hyphenate), purchased the Appeal's printing operation in Girard, Kansas and began printing 3.5 in × 5 in (89 mm × 127 mm) pocket books on cheap pulp paper (similar to that used in pulp magazines), stapled in paper cover. These were first were called The Appeal's Pocket Series and sold in 1919 for 25 cents. The covers were either red or yellow. Over the next several years Haldeman-Julius changed the name successively to The People's Pocket Series, Appeal Pocket Series, Ten Cent Pocket Series, Five Cent Pocket Series, Pocket Series and finally in 1923, Little Blue Books. The five cent price of the books remained in place for many years. Many titles of classic literature were given lurid titles in order to increase sales. Eventually, millions of copies per year were sold in the late 1920s.

In 1922 they renamed the Appeal as The Haldeman-Julius Weekly (known from 1929 to 1951 as The American Freeman), which became the house organ. In 1924 they launched The Haldeman-Julius Monthly (later renamed The Debunker), which had a greater emphasis on Freethought, and in 1932 added The Militant Atheist, among other journals.

The novelist Louis L’Amour (1908–1988) described the Haldeman-Julius publications in his autobiography and their potential influence:

Riding a freight train out of El Paso, I had my first contact with the Little Blue Books. Another hobo was reading one, and when he finished he gave it to me. The Little Blue Books were a godsend to wandering men and no doubt to many others. Published in Girard, Kansas, by Haldeman-Julius, they were slightly larger than a playing card and had sky-blue paper covers with heavy black print titles. I believe there were something more than three thousand titles in all and they were sold on newsstands for 5 or 10 cents each. Often in the years following, I carried ten or fifteen of them in my pockets, reading when I could. Among the books available were the plays of Shakespeare, collections of short stories by De Maupassant, Poe, Jack London, Gogol, Gorky, Kipling, Gautier, Henry James, and Balzac. There were collections of essays by Voltaire, Emerson, and Charles Lamb, among others. There were books on the history of music and architecture, painting, the principles of electricity; and, generally speaking, the books offered a wide range of literature and ideas. […] In subsequent years I read several hundred of the Little Blue Books, including books by Tom Paine, Charles Darwin, and Thomas Huxley.

=== Personal life, death and legacy ===
The couple had two children: Alice Haldeman-Julius Deloach (1917–1991) and Henry Haldeman-Julius (1919–1990; he later changed his name to Henry Julius Haldeman). They adopted Josephine Haldeman-Julius Roselle (b. 1910). Marcet and Emanuel legally separated in 1933. Marcet died in 1941, and a year later Haldeman-Julius married Susan Haney, an employee.

In June 1951 Haldeman-Julius was found guilty of income tax evasion by a Federal grand jury and sentenced to six months in Federal prison and fined $12,500. The next month he drowned in his swimming pool. His son Henry took over his father's publishing efforts, and the books continued to be sold until the printing house burned down on July 4, 1978.

Haldeman-Julius's papers are held at Pittsburg State University in Pittsburg, Kansas, a few miles from Girard in the southeastern corner of the state, as well as at the University of Illinois at Chicago, Indiana University and California State University, Northridge.

== Selected works ==
- "Mark Twain: Radical." International Socialist Review, vol. 11.2 (Aug., 1910), pp. 83–88. Emanuel's first bylined article.
- Dust (with Marcet Haldeman-Julius). New York: Brentano's, 1921.
- Studies in Rationalism. Girard, KS: Haldeman-Julius Publications, 1925.
- The Militant Agnostic. Amherst, NY: Prometheus, 1995 [1926].
- My First Twenty-Five Years. Girard, KS: Haldeman-Julius Publications, 1949.
- My Second Twenty-Five Years. Girard, KS: Haldeman-Julius Publications, 1949.
- The World of Haldeman-Julius (compiled Albert Mordell). New York: Twayne, 1960.
- Short Works (with Marcet Haldeman-Julius). Topeka: Center for Kansas Studies, Washburn University, 1992.
