= Ariel Durant =

American historian (1898–1981)

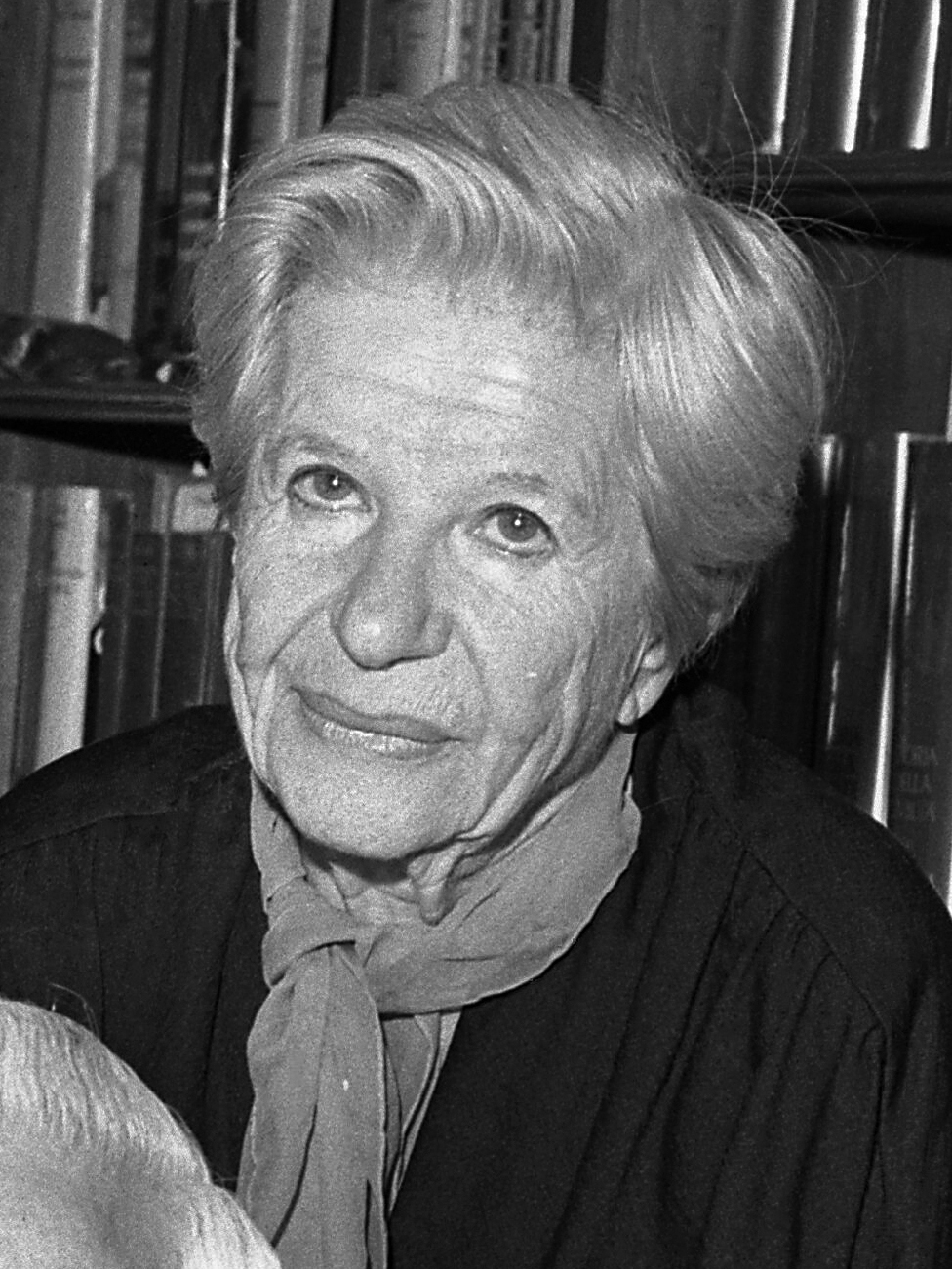
- Durant in 1967
- Born: Chaya Kaufman; May 10, 1898; Proskurov, Podolia Governorate, Russian Empire (now Khmelnytskyi, Ukraine)
- Died: October 25, 1981 (aged 83); Los Angeles, California
- Resting place: Westwood Village Memorial Park Cemetery
- Other name: Ida
- Occupations: Historian; Writer
- Spouse: Will Durant (m. 1913)
- Children: Ethel Durant

Ariel Durant (/dəˈrænt/; born Chaya Kaufman; May 10, 1898 – October 25, 1981) was a Ukrainian-born American researcher and writer. She was the coauthor of The Story of Civilization with her husband, Will Durant. They were awarded the Pulitzer Prize for General Nonfiction.

== Biography ==
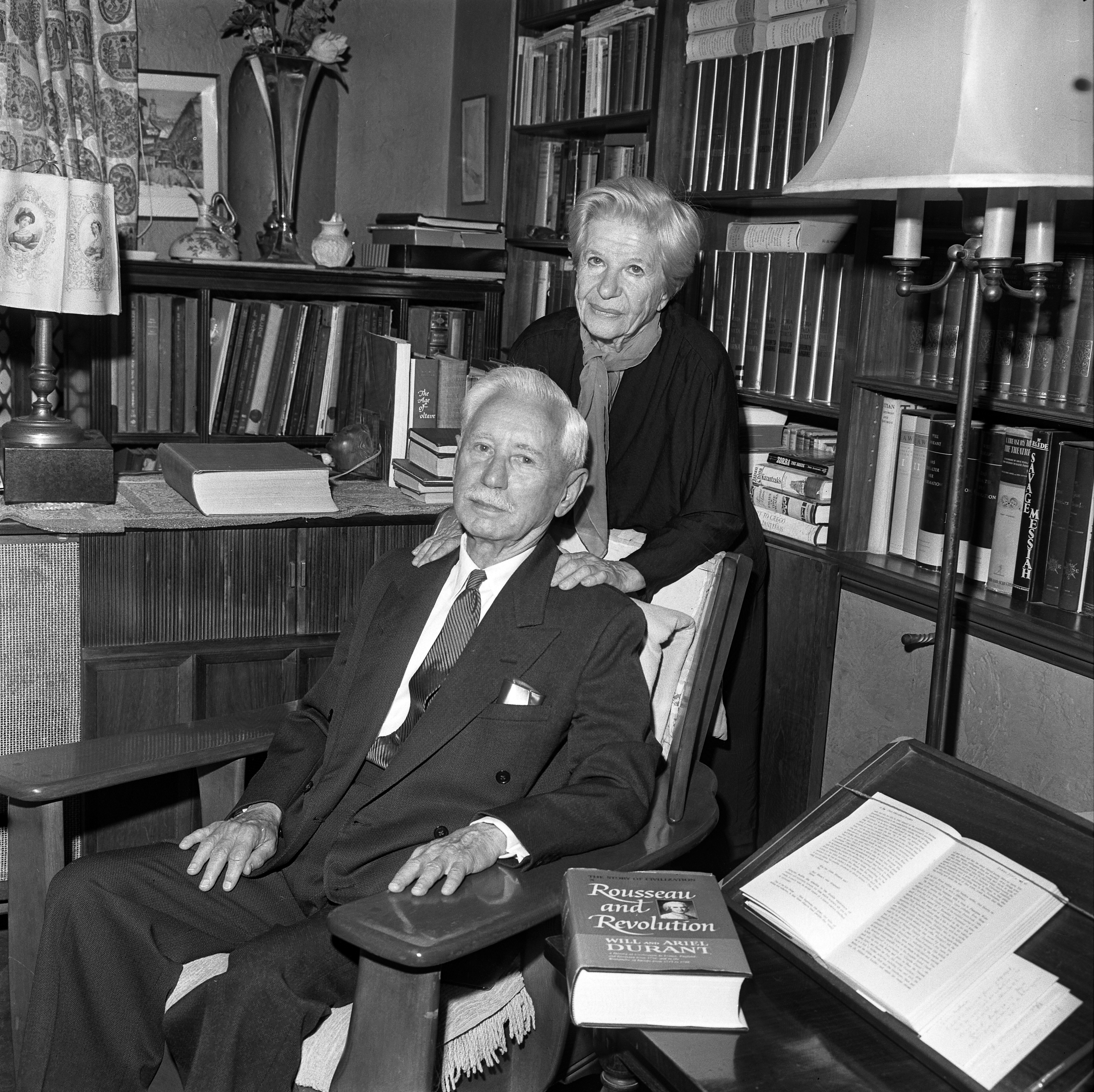
Ariel and Will Durant in the library of their home in Los Angeles, 1967

Durant was born Chaya Kaufman in Proskurov, Russian Empire (now Khmelnytskyi, Ukraine), to Jewish parents Ethel Appel Kaufman and Joseph Kaufman. Ariel later went by Ida. The family emigrated in 1900, living for several months in London 1900–01 en route to the United States, where they arrived in 1901. She had three older sisters, Sarah, Mary, and Flora, and three older brothers, Harry, Maurice, and Michael. Flora became Ariel's companion and sometime assistant, and moved with the Durants to California.

She met her future husband when she was a student at Ferrer Modern School in New York City. He was then a teacher at the school, but resigned his post to marry Ariel. At the time of the wedding, on October 31, 1913, Ariel was 15 and Will Durant was nearly 28 years old. The wedding took place at New York City Hall, to which she roller-skated from her family's home in Harlem. The couple had one daughter, Ethel Benvenuta Durant (1919–1986) and adopted a son, Louis Richard "Lipschultz" Durant (1917–2008) who was the son of Ariel's sister Flora Kaufman Lipschultz and her former husband, Joseph Bernard Lipschultz (divorced 1928). Louis had lived in Will and Ariel's home with his mother, Flora, when he was quite young (1920 Census).

Ariel Durant legally changed her first name to Ariel after the character from Shakespeare's The Tempest, which was the nickname her husband gave her because he said she was "strong and brave as a boy, and as swift and mischievous as an elf".

The Durants were awarded the Pulitzer Prize for General Nonfiction in 1968 for Rousseau and Revolution, the tenth volume of The Story of Civilization. In 1977 they were presented with the Presidential Medal of Freedom by Gerald Ford, and Ariel was named "Woman of the Year" by the city of Los Angeles. The Durants received the Golden Plate Award of the American Academy of Achievement in 1976.

The Durants wrote a 420-page joint autobiography, published by Simon & Schuster in 1978 (A Dual Autobiography; later ISBN 0-671-23078-6).

The Durants died within two weeks of each other in 1981, with Ariel dying on October 25 and Will following on November 7. and are buried at the Westwood Village Memorial Park Cemetery in Los Angeles, California. Ariel told Ethel's daughter, Monica Mehill, that it was their differences that made them grow.
