= Kurt Mueller-Vollmer =

German-American philosopher and academic

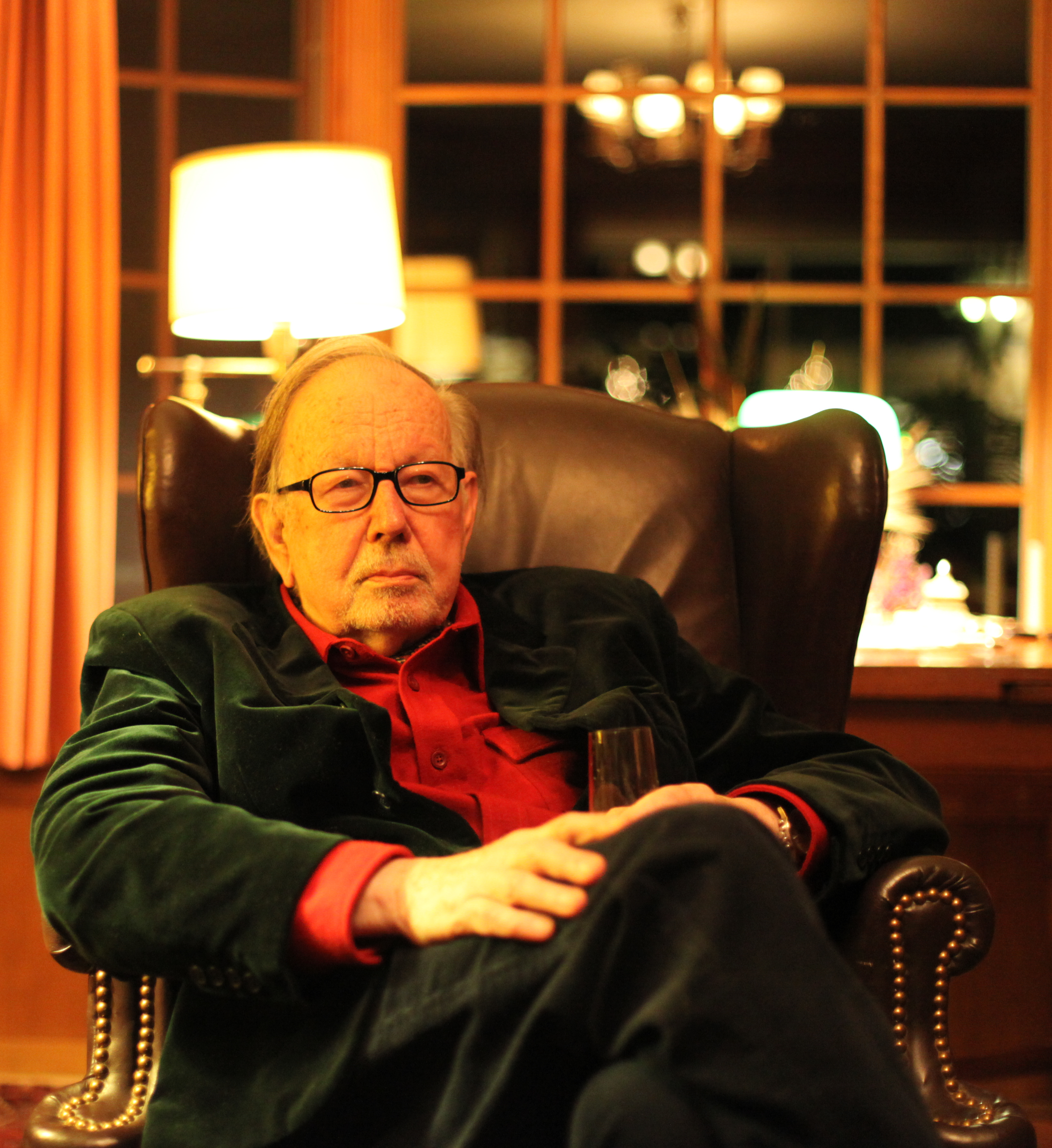
- Kurt Mueller-Vollmer, c. 2010
- Born: June 28, 1928; Hamburg, Germany
- Died: August 3, 2019 (aged 91)

Education
- Education: Brown University (M.A. 1955); Stanford University (PhD, 1962)

Philosophical work
- School: Phenomenology * Continental philosophy * Hermeneutics
- Main interests: Wilhelm von Humboldt; Hermeneutics; Phenomenology; Philology; History; Language; Comparative Literature; Aesthetics

Kurt Mueller-Vollmer (June 28, 1928 – August 3, 2019), born in Hamburg, Germany, was an American philosopher and professor of German Studies and Humanities at Stanford University. Mueller-Vollmer studied in Germany, France, Spain and the United States. He held a master's degree in American Studies from Brown University, and a doctorate in German Studies and Humanities from Stanford University, where he taught for over 40 years. His major publications concentrate in the areas of Literary Criticism, Hermeneutics, Phenomenology, Romantic and Comparative Literature, language theory, cultural transfer and translation studies. Mueller-Vollmer made noteworthy scholarly contributions elucidating the theoretical and empirical linguistic work of Wilhelm von Humboldt, including the discovery of numerous manuscripts previously thought lost or otherwise unknown containing Humboldt's empirical studies of numerous languages from around the world.

Mueller-Vollmer was awarded the Commander's Cross of the Order of Merit of the Federal Republic of Germany in 2000. He was also bestowed with the Wilhelm-von-Humboldt-Foundation Award presented in a public ceremony at the Humboldt University in Berlin, Germany, on June 22, 2007.

== Life ==
=== Early life ===
Born in Hamburg, Germany, June 28, 1928, Mueller-Vollmer grew up in the cities of Cologne and Hamburg, Germany, where, in learning the local dialects of those cities, it was said he developed an early interest in and proficiency for languages and language study. This included a summer English language school on the Frisian island Wyk auf Foehr. Though the classes were cut off by the approach of World War II, they helped to set in motion Mueller-Vollmer’s early acquired proficiency in English.

Mueller-Vollmer and his family survived bombing attacks both in Hamburg and Cologne. Drafted out of high school into the German Army and compelled to serve in an anti-aircraft unit near Cologne, Mueller-Vollmer recounted how he managed to escape through the surrounding woods. Having memorized a map of the Cologne area, Mueller-Vollmer made his way to a small town inhabited by a sympathetic Pietistic religious group where the mayor prepared new identity papers for him. Mueller-Vollmer used these papers to help make his way through checkpoints to reach the invading Allied forces for whom he then served as a translator.

=== Education ===
Following World War II Mueller-Vollmer completed his high school studies at the Friedrich-Wilhelm Gymnasium in Cologne, receiving the Scheffel Prize for the best Abitur (comprehensive final exam) essay in the city of Cologne He then attended the Albertus Magnus University of Cologne where he focused on history, philosophy, German and Romance languages, and became acquainted with renowned scholars and academicians in these fields including Bruno Liebrucks, Gottfried Martin, Karl-Heinz Volkmann-Schluck, Richard Alewyn, Fritz Schalk, and Johannes Hoffmeister.

In 1951-52 Mueller-Vollmer enrolled at the Sorbonne in Paris, France, attending lectures by Maurice Merleau-Ponty, Jean Hyppolite, Gaston Bachelard, and Robert Minder. During the summer of 1952 Mueller-Vollmer traveled to Valladolid, Spain to study Spanish language and literature at the Colegio de Santa Cruz.

Following completion of his university studies in Cologne in 1953, Mueller-Vollmer received a Fulbright Fellowship to attend Brown University, where he focused on American Studies and philology. At Brown, under the guidance of the eminent historian of colonial America, Professor Edmund S. Morgan, Mueller-Vollmer received his Master’s Degree in American Studies. These studies with Professor Morgan helped lay the groundwork for Mueller-Vollmer’s future research on the transfer and contributions of German Romantic discourse and literature to early 19th century American literary culture and philosophy.

From 1956-1958, Mueller-Vollmer received a Ford Foundation fellowship to continue his graduate studies in a newly conceived interdisciplinary graduate Ph.D. program in Humanities at Stanford University. Under the aegis of Professor Kurt F. Reinhardt - an émigré from Germany who had studied at the University of Freiburg-in-Breisgau under the philosopher-phenomenologists Edmund Husserl and Martin Heidegger. Mueller-Vollmer was awarded a Ph.D. in German Studies and Humanities in 1962. Mueller-Vollmer’s Ph.D. dissertation presented for the first time in English a critical exposition of the historian and hermeneutic philosopher Wilhelm Dilthey’s literary theories.

=== Personal life ===
==== Residency ====
Following his studies in Providence, Rhode Island at Brown University, Mueller-Vollmer resided for the remainder of his life near Stanford University, first in Menlo Park, then in Palo Alto. Mueller-Vollmer often took interim residence, taught and traveled in Europe, residing especially in Hamburg and Goettingen, as well as in Paris, Berlin and Cologne.

Prompted by childhood memories of Nazi oppression and terror, Mueller-Vollmer had a visceral distrust of ideologies, propagandist tendencies (the abuse and malicious use of language), and authoritarian regimes. In transitioning to his new life in America and California, and following in the spirit of naturalists and romanticists, Mueller-Vollmer came to regard America, and California in particular, as an environment that encouraged free thought and expression.

Mueller-Vollmer was a linguist who, in addition to his native German language and various dialects such as Plattdeutsch and the Cologne dialect, spoke and wrote English with native fluency. His numerous publications, courses and public lectures were divided between German and English. As well, Mueller-Vollmer spoke and wrote in French and was conversant in Spanish, Italian, Dutch and Latin.

Students and colleagues have attested to Mueller-Vollmer’s demanding standards of scholarship and critical thinking. He also writes poetry.

==== Native Americans ====
Mueller-Vollmer’s scholarship into Wilhelm von Humboldt’s research of North and South American native American languages, as well as the impact of 18th and 19th century missionaries on these languages, led Mueller-Vollmer, in taking a personal interest in the historical plight of Native Americans, to contribute to their charities

==== German-American School ====
During the 1980s and 1990s Mueller-Vollmer took an active role in establishing and maintaining a German-American private primary and secondary bilingual school established in the vicinity of Stanford University.

==== Death ====
He died at his home on August 3, 2019. He was survived by his wife, Patricia Ann Mueller-Vollmer and his two sons.

== Teaching career ==
=== Stanford University ===
Beginning as an instructor in German in 1958, Mueller-Vollmer’s academic and teaching career at Stanford – along with guest professor locations in the United States and Europe - spanned over 50 years. He was appointed 1962-1964 as Assistant Professor of German, 1964-1967 as Associate Professor of German, 1967 until retirement in 1995 as Professor of German and Humanities.

=== Guest professorships ===
Mueller-Vollmer also held a number of guest professorships both in the United States and Europe including at: the University of Hamburg (1962); at the University of Bonn (1976); at the University of Washington at Seattle (1983); at the Institute for Germanic Philology, Uniwertsytet Jagiellonski, Kraków, Poland (1985); as visiting scholar: "Center for Advanced Studies in Translation" at the Georg-August- Universität Göttingen, Germany (1993); at Göttingen as Senior Fulbright Guest Professor (1997); at Göttingen as Participant in Research Project of the "Center for the Advanced Study in the Internationality of National Literatures" at the Georg-August-Universität in Göttingen where he was responsible for the project "Madame de Staël in America" as part of a larger research undertaking: "Internationale Vernetzung: Personen, Medien und Institutionen als Vermittlungsinstanzen von Literatur" (1998-1999); further extended stays at Göttingen in 1998, 1999, 2000; at the University of California at Berkeley, Department of German (Spring, 2005, 2006).

== Scholarship, research and writing career ==
=== Fields of study ===
Mueller-Vollmer’s scholarly work included: philosophy and phenomenology; German and European philosophy; the history of ideas; literary theory; philosophy of language; philosophical and literary hermeneutics (interpretation theory); poetics; German and European literature from the 18th and 19th centuries; history and methodologies of the humanities and human sciences; linguistics; translation and discourse theory; European and American Romanticism; American Transcendentalism and 19th century German-American cultural transfers and literary discourse; the internationality of literature; European modernism; modern poetry; and the philosophical and empirical work of Wilhelm von Humboldt. In his teaching and writing Mueller-Vollmer moved freely among these different areas.

=== Areas of private scholarship ===
In addition to his teaching duties as Stanford Professor of German and Humanities, Mueller-Vollmer gave public lectures involving topics beyond his regular university course work. These topics included the thought and empirical work of Wilhelm von Humboldt, German-American cultural transfer, the internationality of literature, discourse transfer theory and the work of Germaine de Staël, translation theory and philosophical and literary hermeneutics.

=== Personal library and papers ===
Mueller-Vollmer substantially catalogued his papers to facilitate continuing study, research and additional publication.

=== Sources of influence and engagement ===
Mueller-Vollmer’s scholarly work often treated and drew from the following thinkers and poets: Giambattista Vico, William von Humboldt (especially), Immanuel Kant, J. G. Herder, J. G. Fichte, Fr. Schleiermacher, J. W. Goethe, Germaine de Staël, the Jena Romantics, William Coleridge, R. W. Emerson and the New England Transcendentalists, R. M. Rilke, Christian Morgenstern, Dadaism, Wilhelm Dilthey, Edmund Husserl, Roman Ingarden and Terry Winograd (concerning the relationship between artificial intelligence and translation,).

Mueller-Vollmer also critiqued such diverse thinkers and schools as St. Augustine, 18th century German Missionaries in America, G. W. F. Hegel, K. Marx and F. Nietzsche, Ferdinand de Saussure, H-G. Gadamer, K-O. Apel and J. Habermas, and various schools of contemporary literary criticism such as New Criticism, Formalism, Reception Theory, Structuralism and Postmodernism.

=== Overarching themes ===
As reflected by his concentration on the work of Wilhelm von Humboldt and Romantic language theory, overarching themes of Mueller-Vollmer’s scholarship included the role of creative imagination and “the seminal interplay of philosophy, poetics, hermeneutics, literary and poetic production” in shaping how consciousness is formed and reality in the form of views of the world is conceived, experienced and presented.

=== Approaches, theories and methods ===
In his writings Mueller-Vollmer would often comparatively frame topics such as the nature of the literary work of art, the concept of interpretation, or the feasibility of discourse transfer and translation within embracing philosophical dimensions, schools and debates. After presenting and placing an issue or theme in historical, comparative or structural context, he would proceed to discuss its implications and consequences.

Mueller-Vollmer referenced Goethe’s notion of “multiple reflexion or mirroring whereby each reflexion of a phenomenon yields a different view of the same phenomenon. . . . At the end these multiple reflexions should yield some essential insight (or Wesensschau) into the whole phenomenon in all its complexity.” As an example, Mueller-Vollmer explains, an American literary figure such as Francis Lieber might be viewed within the context of his role as a translator. Similar aspects of this figure might then appear in other contexts, such as performing editorship and conducting research activities. Such different contexts taken together could afford a deeper understanding of the figure’s work.

Mueller-Vollmer held that, as “the starting point of any historical doctrine which attempts to interpret and to explain mankind's cultural institutions and creations” one should consider “universal elements as they are embedded in a particular historical configuration and the relation between the two.” Such universals comprise key underlying structural conditions and generic human abilities involved in the ability to understand foreign languages and poetic discourse across time such as from the Homeric era.

These universals would extend across disciplinary lines to characterize both modes of being and an understanding of what those human activities styled as “humanities” perform. For example, early in his career Mueller-Vollmer investigated how Wilhelm Dilthey, employing the concepts of essence, type and symbol, intended for his poetic to provide a comprehensive approach to the study of literary phenomena and to serve to evaluate diverse critical approaches encountered in European and American studies of the human sciences.

=== Recent work ===
In 2014, Mueller-Vollmer published Transatlantic Crossings and Transformations: German-American Cultural Transfer from the 18th to the End of the 19th Century. This work, including a focus on aspects of translation and discourse theory and New England Transcendentalism, studies eighteenth and nineteenth century German-American cultural transfers which, according to Mueller-Vollmer, played an important part in the formation of earlier American national and cultural identity.

Mueller-Vollmer’s book, Zu Hermeneutik, Literaturkritik und Sprachtheorie (On Hermeneutics, Theory of Literature and Language), comprises a series of essays in German and English exploring how J. G. Fichte, J. G. Herder, W. Humboldt and the Romantics understood the role of language and imagination in shaping human experience and art, including how language, self-consciousness and understanding arise through speech. Along with topics concerning the literary work of art, the philosophy of history, German humanities, philology, and semiotics, the book also considers how phenomenology and the concept of interpretation play a role in literary theory. In discussing the work of Giambatista Vico, A. W. Schlegel and F. Schlegel, Novalis, Germaine de Staël, Fr. Schleiermacher, G. W. F. Hegel and H-G. Gadamer, the essays also elucidate romantic poetics, hermeneutics, translation theory, discourse and cultural transfer topics.

== Humanities work ==
=== Views on the humanities ===
In a 1991 lecture on his research into recovering Wilhelm von Humboldt’s lost linguistic research manuscripts, Mueller-Vollmer noted that human studies characteristically involve the relationship between the establishment of fact on the one hand, and the task of interpretation and reconstruction on the other.

Mueller-Vollmer believed one must go beyond merely regarding the humanities as a reprieve from other, more restricting disciplines and frameworks such as “the sciences, technology, the world of engineering, industry, or war production,” or merely standing for the 'humane’ side of our culture.” He rejected what he regarded as a “totally false view" and "false dualism" not only of the humanities “but of the real world as well” that the humanities “are supposed to supply us with values and other good things and serve as an antidote, or at least as a temporary escape from the serious business of the world.”

However much the humanities may be thought to comprise various fields meant to preserve and cultivate subjective-cultural human expressions, as a starting point Mueller-Vollmer chose not proceed to study or present the humanities as a set of fixed disciplines with traditional themes as though one already understood what the humanities were about or what role they played. Rather, he approached them heuristically, as an “unknown,” an “other,” as he states in his seminar course notes, into which we can then inquire and expand upon.

==== Role of Giambatista Vico's New Science ====
As an example, in his 1996 Stanford seminar, Vico's New Science: Introduction to the Humanities, Mueller-Vollmer, using Vico’s New Science (Nueva Scienzia) as a starting point, proceeded to regard the humanities as an “other,” and - not unlike formulating hypotheses or approaches in the sciences - to advance toward an understanding based on what pre-knowledge one might already possess. A threshold issue would be how to bridge the gap between modern and ancient world views such as prevailed in Homer’s era.

Mueller-Vollmer suggested that Vico's major work, New Science, “sets forth an understanding of its subject matter, i.e. the humanities in the full sense of the word.” Mueller-Vollmer considered that the effort to understand the New Science would be instructive concerning the humanities by engaging in them - in effect, by interpreting a work. It would also “at the same time deal with the nature of humanistic studies by showing what they are all about. It is in this dual sense that the book (New Science) will serve us as an introduction to the humanities.”

=== History and historiography ===
Along with philosophy and literature, history, historiography, cultural and literary history were core topics of Mueller-Vollmer’s formative studies at the University of Cologne, the Sorbonne, and Brown University with Professor Edmund S. Morgan, and play important roles in his writings. Mueller-Vollmer essays might combine biography, political, cultural and literary history with language theory, discourse transfer and translation theory. In his essays Mueller-Vollmer typically contextualized topics and issues within their cultural-historical and intellectual-historical frameworks

Mueller-Vollmer’s history teaching and scholarship includes:

- Humanities Seminars on the Philosophy of History;
- Wilhelm von Humboldt’s philosophy of man and views on the nature of history and historical research including the historical circumstances framing Humboldt’s political work;
- The social and political circumstances in France and Paris when Humboldt stayed in Paris during the period of the French Revolution to observe political and educational transformations;
- Herder and the formation of an American national consciousness during the Early Republic;
- The relationship between historiography and hermeneutics;
- Whether and how historical frameworks function as conditions of and limits to understanding [Verstehen];
- Challenges and assumptions in attempting to bridge cultural-historical temporal distances
- Hegel’s exposition of the teleological historical unfolding of Spirit [Geist] as presented in the Phenomenology of Spirit;
- The internationalization of German Romanticism in the Americas and its relationship to the emergence of a distinct American national literature;
- 18th and early 19th century American intellectual, cultural and literary history, including New England Transcendentalism, German missionary work among Native Americans, and the development of linguistics in the 18th and 19th century America.

=== Philosophy, phenomenology and literary theory ===
In his study of philosophy Mueller-Vollmer focused on thinkers and authors such as J. G. Fichte, J. W. Goethe, Wilhelm von Humboldt, F. Schlegel and A. W. Schlegel, Wm. Coleridge and W. Dilthey, who in particular reflected on those mental activities by which objects of experience and experience of them are constituted – especially mental activities deemed to be universal, creative, and imaginative. As well, in his writings and courses Mueller-Vollmer specialized in the phenomenology of Edmund Husserl and the literary and aesthetic theories of the Polish phenomenologist Roman Ingarden.

==== Writings on romanticism ====
Examples of Mueller-Vollmer's writings on Romanticism include:

- an essay devoted to J. G. Fichte and Romantic language theories that discusses how Fichte’s contributions to Romantic language theory add to understanding Romantic poetics and aesthetics, and how key Fichtean notions such as reciprocity and imagination in the thought of Fichte, August Bernhardi, Wilhelm von Humboldt, A. W. Schlegel and Coleridge contribute to an understanding of the nature of self-consciousness, language and poetry;
- an essay discussing Fichte’s notion of the reciprocal “I-You” structure of consciousness, how this notion provided a path for Wilhelm von Humboldt to go beyond Cartesian subject-predicate-object logic to develop a linguistic basis for consciousness based on concepts of the divisibility, articulation and matching of thoughts with word sounds;
- an essay that discusses how the Romantics stressed the interdependency of poetic, linguistic, and hermeneutic thought, innovated translating strategies, and developed a priori theories on how language, self-consciousness and understanding arise in speech acts, including how language is “poetic” and “symbolizing” in nature (A. W. Schlegel), involves a “formative presentation” of ideas and objects (Humboldt), and how understanding functions as a “speech act” in reverse (Schleiermacher). According to Mueller-Vollmer, the notion of language as an essential medium of interaction dominated romantic language theory (Die Idee der Sprache als eines dem Menschen wesentlichen Organs der Wechselwirkung beherrscht die gesamte romantische Sprachtheorie);
- Wilhelm von Humboldt’s development of a theory of aesthetics that anticipates 20th century theories.

== Wilhelm von Humboldt scholarship ==
=== As editor and commentator ===
As editor, analyst and commentator Mueller-Vollmer compiled a two volume study edition of Humboldt’s writings on aesthetics, literary theory, political theory and historiography, the study of which Mueller-Vollmer believed would substantially revise Humboldt’s image.

Mueller-Vollmer authored entries on Wilhelm von Humboldt for German publications as well as the entry for Wilhelm von Humboldt in the Stanford Encyclopedia of Philosophy.

=== Discovery of and research on Humboldt's linguistic empirical writings ===
Mueller-Vollmer noted that Humboldt sought to “circumscribe, assess and analyze the entire cosmos of the human languages and to treat them as a key to an understanding of human history and culture,” originated concepts of language that anticipated developments in 20th century linguistics, and derived concepts of language structure and grammar that were not obtained from Latin language-based notions and forms. Mueller-Vollmer held that Humboldt’s recently discovered or re-examined manuscripts reinforce Humboldt’s theory that the world’s languages in their diversity individually express innate human linguistic abilities, but also that humanity’s diverse languages are not necessarily mutually derived or related. Rather, languages emerge from the inherent human capacity for linguistic expression. This Humboldtian view Mueller-Vollmer believed had become lost to subsequent linguistic schools, suggesting the need for a renewed evaluation of Humboldt’s linguistic thought.

Various Mueller-Vollmer articles and lectures take up the nature and dimensions of Humboldt’s empirical linguistic research. These include:

- how Wilhelm with the assistance of his brother Alexander obtained grammars and other linguistic documents for languages from around the world including the Americas;
- two articles contained in Humboldt’s workbooks from Humboldt’s first investigative encounters with the Basque country and Basque language in 1800 and 1801, which articles Mueller-Vollmer had found among Humboldt’s papers located in the Bibliotheka Jagiellońska in Krakau, Poland; Mueller-Vollmer discusses how Humboldt’s initial reflections on the Basque language anticipated Humboldt’s major theories, including the notion of linguistic structure (Sprachbau), and the interdependence of nation, language and history, as later developed in Humboldt’s major linguistic works;
- an article on philological issues relating to various editions of the introduction to Humboldt’s magnum opus three volume work on the ancient Java Island Kawi language and related Australasian Malay-Polynesian languages;
- a review of an English translation of Humboldt’s Introduction to the Kawi Language where Mueller-Vollmer discusses issues relating to recent receptions of Humboldt’s linguistic work;
- an evaluation of manuscripts located in the manuscript division of the Boston Public Library of Humboldt’s correspondence with the American lawyer and linguist John Pickering from which Mueller-Vollmer was able “to gather new, extensive and invaluable information about Humboldt’s empirical work on the Native American languages of North, Central and South America, and the role his work played in the formative period of American linguistics,” including “plans for a comprehensive monograph accompanied by individual volumes analyzing the grammars of the important Indian languages of the Americas.” Mueller-Vollmer states that he first became aware of the Pickering letters through research in 1970 of Humboldt’s archive located in the East German Academy.

=== Critical-historical edition of Humboldt's linguistic writings ===
With the assistance of other Humboldt scholars and the support of the Alexander von Humboldt Stiftung, Mueller-Vollmer undertook as principle editor (Herausgeber) to publish with the Schoeningh Verlag a multi-volume series of Humboldt’s empirical writings on linguistics that would present and evaluate Humboldt’s linguistic legacy in detail.

The introductory volume for this series, published in 1993, incorporates Mueller-Vollmer's catalogues and provides an overview and description of Humboldt’s linguistic manuscripts and papers, and diverse grammatical and other empirical studies Humboldt produced for languages in Asia, Europe and the Americas. These include manuscripts and other papers located by Mueller-Vollmer’s searches. In this volume Mueller-Vollmer also recounts major aspects of the search for these manuscripts.

=== Language theory ===
Various Mueller-Vollmer articles take up aspects of Wilhelm von Humboldt’s theories on language:

- how Humboldt’s linguistic thought contributed to the Romantics’ understanding of language and poetry in providing a conceptual framework for the Romantics to fashion a notion of language and of the relationship of language to art.
- how Humboldt in his 1795 aphoristic essay Denken und Sprechen (Thinking and Speaking) understood the simultaneous shaping of thinking and signification as occurring within the inherent linguisticality of the human mind that imposes, via the sensory medium of language, order upon the “unending and amorphous flow of impressions and mental images;”
- how Herder first shifted focus from signs themselves to the process of signification, then how Humboldt understood that language, as manifested in its material-phenomenal aspect in acts of speaking, embodies an inherent order for which the first instance is speech as the joining together of articulated sound and signified thought, and as well that languages embody in their very structure the perspective through which its speakers view and experience the world;
- discusses Saussure’s notion of communication as a psychological process, then how Humboldt viewed language not as a system of mental objects but as an activity where speech has the central role in a sign-producing process matching segmentations of thought with articulations of sound in uniting sensibility with understanding;
- how, as 19th and 20th century linguistics developed, Humboldt’s linguistic work was neutralized and historically marginalized, including by linguists purporting to draw from Humboldt’s thinking.

=== Poetics, aesthetics and language theory ===
Other Mueller-Vollmer books, essays and collections take up Humboldt’s poetics and aesthetic theories:

- in providing an historical and structural study of the development of Humboldt’s theory of poetry, especially in relation to Friedrich Jacobi, Christian Gottfried Koener, and, in particular, Friedrich Schiller, and offering a German translation of an essay Humboldt wrote in French for Germaine de Staël, author of On Germany (d’Allemagne), Poesie und Einbildungskraft holds that Humboldt’s theories with their emphasis on the role of imagination and the idealization of sensory experience anticipate phenomenological literary and other 20th century theories;
- W. von Humboldt, Studienausgabe 1 offers an introductory anthology of Humboldt’s aesthetic and poetic writings;
- discusses how Humboldt’s linguistic thought contributed to the Romantics’ conception of language and poetry; in defining poetry as “art through language” how Humboldt contributed to a conceptual framework by which the Romantics fashioned their concept of language and the relationship of language to art;
- discusses Humboldt’s concept of understanding in relation to language theory and translation including how understanding can bridge cultures and language families; how humankind’s universal capacity for linguistic expression, though expressed in a myriad of languages, provides a basis for reciprocal understanding and translation among languages and cultures.
- how Humboldt’s concepts of reciprocity in speech and of linguistic types by which speech is performed both laid a foundation for general and comparative theory of language and how, in combining concepts from both the natural and human sciences, these concepts have contributed to the development of linguistics and the humanities in general.

=== Political theory and history ===
Mueller-Vollmer’s articles and collections that discuss Humboldt’s political theory, history and related topics include:

- an introductory anthology to Humboldt’s writings on political theory and history; includes an essay on Humboldt's philosophy of man and the historical world, critical notes and commentary;
- a discussion of Humboldt’s political thought in relation to his critique of the French Revolution and the problem of using rational methods to abruptly and radically transform existing social fabrics; as well discusses knowledge Humboldt gained from observing how the French Ideologues attempted to make over the French educational system and how this knowledge played a role in Humboldt’s later efforts to redesign the Prussian educational system in light of Humboldt’s ideal of education (Bildung);
- an examination of Humboldt’s understanding of the binary terms “diversity” and “universality” (das Verschiedene, das Allgemeine) and the challenges involved in understanding how these two concepts interact when applied to language theory and human affairs; also discusses Humboldt’s notion of type and typology as a concept mediating the general and the diverse.

== Philosophy, hermeneutics, discourse and translation theory ==
In discussing Wilhelm von Humboldt’s review of A. W. Schlegel’s Latin translation of the Bhagavad-Gita and G. W. F. Hegel’s related criticisms, one Mueller-Vollmer essay examines how for Humboldt humankind’s generic language ability results in the great diversity of its actual languages and cultures, and whether one can comprehend another language and discourse by transcending the discursive barriers seemingly imposed by ones own language, culture and history.

Mueller-Vollmer considered whether a philosophical text such as Hegel’s Phenomenology of Spirit (Phaenomenologie des Geistes) incorporates concepts that resist straightforward translation such that a performative reading experience as expressed in Hegel’s text is ultimately confined to the text’s original German language (by performative reading experience is here understood as one which, within the framework of the Phenomenology, re-performs a given stage of consciousness as Spirit (Geist) sequentially unfolds itself and comes to itself in time).

More specifically, Mueller-Vollmer considered difficulties encountered in translating into French and English certain German terms such as meinen (to mean, intend, opine, think) Hegel used in the initial chapter of the Phenomenology of Spirit to present the pre-linguistic phase of consciousness known as “sensory certainty” [Sinnliche Gewissheit]. Mueller-Vollmer also queried how language could adequately linguistically perform a presentation of consciousness formed at a pre-linguistic stage, or, even assuming language could do so, which language (e.g. German? French? English?) philosophy could then best employ to properly present the state of mind experienced in pre-linguistic sensory certainty within the overall self-presenting (self-performing) framework of the Phenomenology. (According to Mueller-Vollmer, in reading the Phenomenology the reader adopts or re-lives in turn, chapter by chapter, the forms of consciousness as consciousness moves through its evolving stages from sensory certainty at the outset to art, religion and philosophy at the end).

== Translation, cultural transfer and discourse theory ==
Within the broader dimensions of his work in philosophy, hermeneutics and literary theory Mueller-Vollmer researched issues concerning cultural transfer and translation – how understanding between different cultures may be achieved and their concepts, values, world views and literature shared cross-culturally and internationally. Towards that end Mueller-Vollmer participated in various conferences at the University of Göttingen on the internationality of national literature in the Americas and focused on, among other topics, the emergence of an American national literature in post-colonial New England.

=== Essays and studies ===
Together with Professor Armin Paul Frank, Mueller-Vollmer authored a volume of studies on the internationality of literature in British America and the United States from the 1770s to the 1850s that takes into account both cross-Atlantic and inter-American literary transfers and transformations. These studies discuss how the Americanization of literature written in English occurred whereby America’s emerging national literature became different from but still connected to European counterparts, mostly British and German. As well, the studies note that many Anglo-American writers, including the Transcendentalists, R. W. Emerson for example, drew inspiration from German Romantic authors and their sources.

With Michael Irmscher, Mueller-Vollmer edited and contributed to a volume of translation studies with an essay clarifying the relationship between translation, cultural transfer, discursive aspects of the translation process, and the formation of a new cultural discourse. The essay considers how translations from classical and Romantic German literature contributed to “the formation of the literary and philosophical discourse of New England Transcendentalism in the first half of the nineteenth century.” In noting that a target language may lack a discourse corresponding to the source language, the essay questions whether target languages can “readily incorporate foreign works,” as for example in New England in regard to German Romanticism and German Idealism.

In An international Encyclopedia of Translation Studies Mueller-Vollmer’s entry reviews the relationship of translation issues to various philosophical positions regarding language as documented from Plato to L. Wittgenstein. Translation issues include whether corresponding words of various languages represent the same objects whereby translation would be relatively straightforward, or whether the meanings of diverse language expressions do not inherently coincide because the meanings of individual words are formed within the diverse meaning (cultural) frameworks of a language as a whole, and so seldom, if at all, correspond to those of another language. As such, a major issue involves how translation can bridge such semantic gaps.

Another essay on the internationalization of literature discusses how Germaine de Staël's On Germany (de l’Allemagne), in presenting German Romanticism - its philosophy, theology and aesthetics, bridged semantic gaps between languages, and mediated a Romantic discourse to writers internationally. In considering the mutual dependency of translation and a discourse to accommodate it, Mueller-Vollmer discusses how On Germany takes up the matter of creating a literary discourse in the target language equivalent to the source language if lacking in the target language's milieu.

=== German-American cultural transfer ===
In Transatlantic Crossings and Transformations: German-American Cultural Transfer from the 18th to the End of the 19th Century, Mueller-Vollmer presents a study of the process of German-American cultural transfer during the 18th and 19th centuries and the role this process played in the formation of an American national and cultural identity, to which the New England Transcendentalists significantly contributed.

This study includes discussions of the key role German Romanticism and its sources played via translated texts and discourse transfer in the process of German-American cultural transfer.

In elucidating how Germaine de Staël’s work On Germany (De l’Allemagne) helped to introduce German Romanticism into France and America, Mueller-Vollmer’s study discusses how this transfer played an important role in the formation of American national and cultural identity, to which the New England Transcendentalists made significant contributions. His study also considers how a systematic discourse theory of translation might be developed according to which a state of affairs spoken about and the language which speaks of it form an indissoluble unity. As such, not language in general but individual languages as actually spoken and written are involved. The essay considers how in the translating process discourse formation must occur when the target language lacks a discourse corresponding to the source language, for example as occurred when Germaine de Staël introduced German literary, philosophical and theological discourse into France.

== Selected honors and awards ==
- 1965-1966, 1975: American Philosophical Society Research grant
- 1979–1980: Senior Fellow of the National Endowment for the Humanities
- 1989: Alexander von Humboldt Foundation research fellowship
- 1997: Fulbright senior scholar for research and graduate teaching at the University of Göttingen for spring and summer.
- 2000: Commander's Cross of the Order of Merit of the Federal Republic of Germany. (Bundesverdienstkreuz 1. Klasse).
- 2007: Wilhelm-von-Humboldt-Foundation Award (Wilhelm-von-Humboldt-Stiftungspreis 2007) Award presented in a public ceremony at the Humboldt University in Berlin on June 22.

== Publications ==
=== Books ===
- Toward a Phenomenological Theory of Literature: A Study of Wilhelm Dilthey's Poetik (The Hague: Mouton, 1963).
- Poesie und Einbildungskraft: Zur Dichtungstheorie Wilhelm von Humboldts. Mit der zweisprachigen Ausgabe eines Aufsatzes Humboldts für Frau von Stael (Stuttgart: Metzler, 1967).
- Humboldt Studienausgabe, Band 1: Aesthetik und Literatur (With Preface, Introduction, And Critical Commentary) (Frankfurt: Fischer, 1970).
- Return from Italy. Goethe's Notebook 1788. A bilingual Presentation of JW. Goethe's notebook that he kept during his return from Italy in 1788, with an introductory poem, notes, and commentary (Los Altos, California: Guido Press, 1970).
- Humboldt Studienausgabe, Band 2: Politik und Geschichte (With Preface, an Essay on Humboldt's philosophy of man and the historical world, Critical Notes and Commentary) (Frankfurt: Fischer, 1971).
- Wilhelm von Humboldt und der Anfang der amerikanischen Sprachwissenschaft: Die Briefe an John Pickering (Frankfurt: Klostermann, 1976).
- The Hermeneutics Reader. Texts of the German Tradition from the Enlightenment to the Present. Edited with an Introduction and Notes (New York: Continuum/Crossroad, 1985).
- The Hermeneutics Reader. English edition (Oxford: Blackwell, 1986).
- The Hermeneutics Reader. American paperback edition (New York, 1988 to 2010).
- Herder Today. Contributions from the International Herder Conference, Nov.5-8, 1987, Stanford, California (Berlin and New York: Walter de Gruyter, 1990).
- Wilhelm von Humboldts Sprachwissenschaft. Ein kommentiertes Verzeichnis des sprachwissenschaftlichen Nachlasses. Mit einer Einleitung und zwei Anhängen (Paderborn, München, Wien, Zürich: F. Schöning Verlag, 1993).
- Wilhelm von Humboldt und die amerikanischen Sprachen, ed. together with K. Zimmermann and J. Trabant (Paderborn, München, Wien, Zürich: F. Schöningh Verlag, 1994).
- Translating Literatures, Translating Cultures. New Vistas and Approaches in Literary Studies, ed. with Michael Irmscher (Berlin: E. Schmidt Verlag, 1998).
- Same: Stanford, Ca., Stanford University Press, 1999.
- The Internationality of National Literatures in either America: British America and the United States, 1770s-1850s (Göttingen: Wallstein Verlag, 2000).
- Jointly with Armin Paul Frank, Transatlantic Crossings and Transformations: German –American Cultural Transfer from the 18th to the End of the 19th Century (Bern: Peter Lang, 2015).
- Transatlantic Crossings and Transformations: German-American Cultural Transfer from the 18th to the End of the 19th Century (Bern: Peter Lang, 2014).
- Zu Hermeneutik, Literaturkritik und Sprachtheorie (On Hermeneutics, Theory of Literature and Language), (Berlin: Peter Lang, 2018).
