= Louis Mink =

American philosopher

Louis O. Mink Jr.
- Born: September 3, 1921
- Died: January 19, 1983 (aged 61)
- Occupation: Philosopher of history

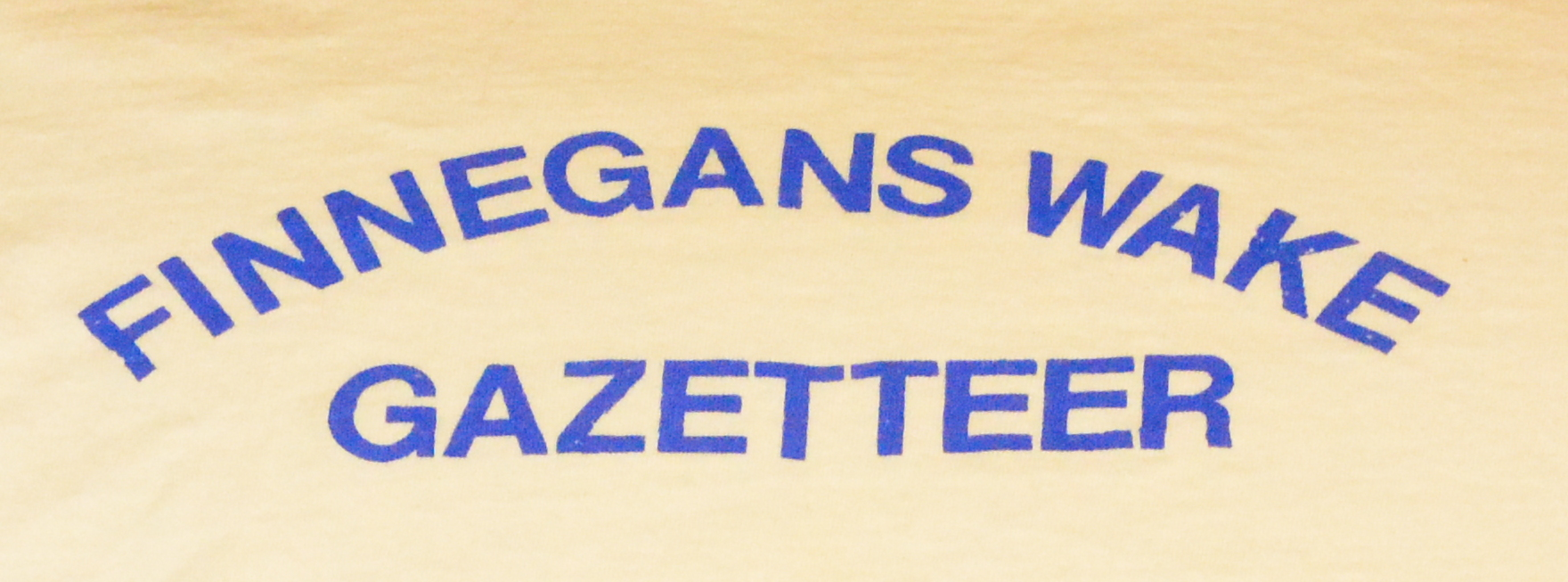
Detail of a Finnegans Wake Gazetteer T-shirt

Louis Otto Mink Jr. (Ada, September 3, 1921 – Hartford, January 19, 1983) was an American philosopher of history whose works challenged early philosopher of history R. G. Collingwood and were part of a postmodern dialogue on history and historical narrative with other philosophers of history, like Hayden White and Georg Lukács. Mink and White were responsible for what would later be called the "linguistic turn" in philosophy of history.

Mink received his bachelor's degree from Hiram College, then served in the United States Army during World War II. After the war, he received a master's degree and doctorate from Yale. He became a member of the faculty at Wesleyan University in 1952 and remained in the department until he died of a heart attack on January 19, 1983. While at Wesleyan, he was chair of the philosophy department from 1967 to 1976, the Kenan Professor of Humanities and director of the Center for Humanities. He had a wife named Helen Patterson, two sons and a daughter.

Mink's largest contribution to history and philosophy of history was to emphasize the need for history to think of its published narratives as very similar to other narrative forms, such as fiction. Mink also asserts that thinking about history as "a true representation of the past" gives rise to a great deal of assumption amongst historians that poses serious problems for history by misrepresenting it and its subject matter. Mink was also important in studying James Joyce's fiction; most notably, his A Finnegans Wake Gazetteer (1978) documents all the place names in Joyce's Finnegans Wake.

The interest in Joyce was not tangential. Finnegans Wake had embedded in it a cyclical structure of time and history, influenced by Giambattista Vico's (1668–1744) "La Scienza Nuova" (The New Science). Mink also ran seminars on Finnegans Wake that drew both faculty and students in interactive examinations of Joyce's work and was known for both the range of his knowledge and his wit, which could be self-deprecating. When a student informed that he was dropping out of the seminar because he was not ready for Finnegans Wake, Mink replied, "Brian, if you are ever ready for Finnegans Wake", pausing to draw on his pipe, "it is a pretty good indication that you have wasted your life."
