= Historical recurrence =

Repetition of similar events in history

Historical recurrence is the concept that, in the study of history, similar events are sometimes found to re-occur. The concept has been applied to various levels of human history, from the rise and fall of empires, to patterns in the history of a given polity, to any two specific events which bear a striking similarity.

In his 1979 book The Idea of Historical Recurrence in Western Thought, G. W. Trompf traces historically recurring patterns of political thought and behavior in the West since antiquity.

== Authors ==
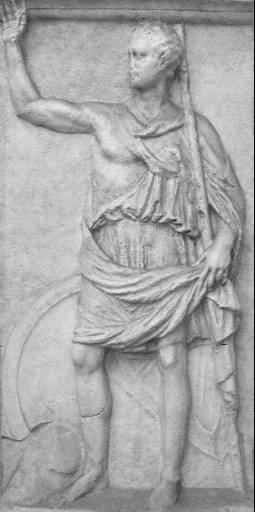
Polybius

Ancient western thinkers who thought about recurrence were largely concerned with cosmological rather than historical recurrence. Western philosophers and historians who have discussed various concepts of historical recurrence include the Greek Hellenistic historian Polybius (c. 200 – c. 118 BCE), the Greek historian and rhetorician Dionysius of Halicarnassus (c. 60 BCE – after 7 BCE), Luke the Evangelist, Niccolò Machiavelli (1469–1527), Giambattista Vico (1668–1744), Correa Moylan Walsh (1862–1936), and Arnold J. Toynbee (1889–1975).

G. W. Trompf describes various historical paradigms of historical recurrence, including paradigms that view types of large-scale historical phenomena variously as "cyclical"; "fluctuant"; "reciprocal"; "re-enacted"; or "revived". He also notes "[t]he view proceeding from a belief in the uniformity of human nature [Trompf's emphasis]. It holds that because human nature does not change, the same sort of events can recur at any time." "Other minor cases of recurrence thinking", he writes, "include the isolation of any two specific events which bear a very striking similarity, and the preoccupation with parallelism, that is, with resemblances, both general and precise, between separate sets of historical phenomena".

In ancient Eastern thought, Confucius (ca. 551 – ca. 479 BCE) urged: "Study the past if you would define the future."

In the Islamic world, Ibn Khaldun (1332–1406) remarked, in his Muqaddimah, that "The past resembles the future more than one [drop of] water another." He wrote that asabiyyah (social cohesion or group unity) plays an important role in a kingdom's or dynasty's cycle of rise and fall.

== Lessons from history ==
Trompf notes that most western concepts of historical recurrence imply that "the past teaches lessons for ... future action"—that "the same ... sorts of events which have happened before ... will recur". One proponent of the idea of cosmic cycles was Poseidonius (c. 135 – c. 51 BCE), who argued that dissipation of the old Roman virtues had followed the removal of the Carthaginian challenge to Rome's supremacy in the Mediterranean world.

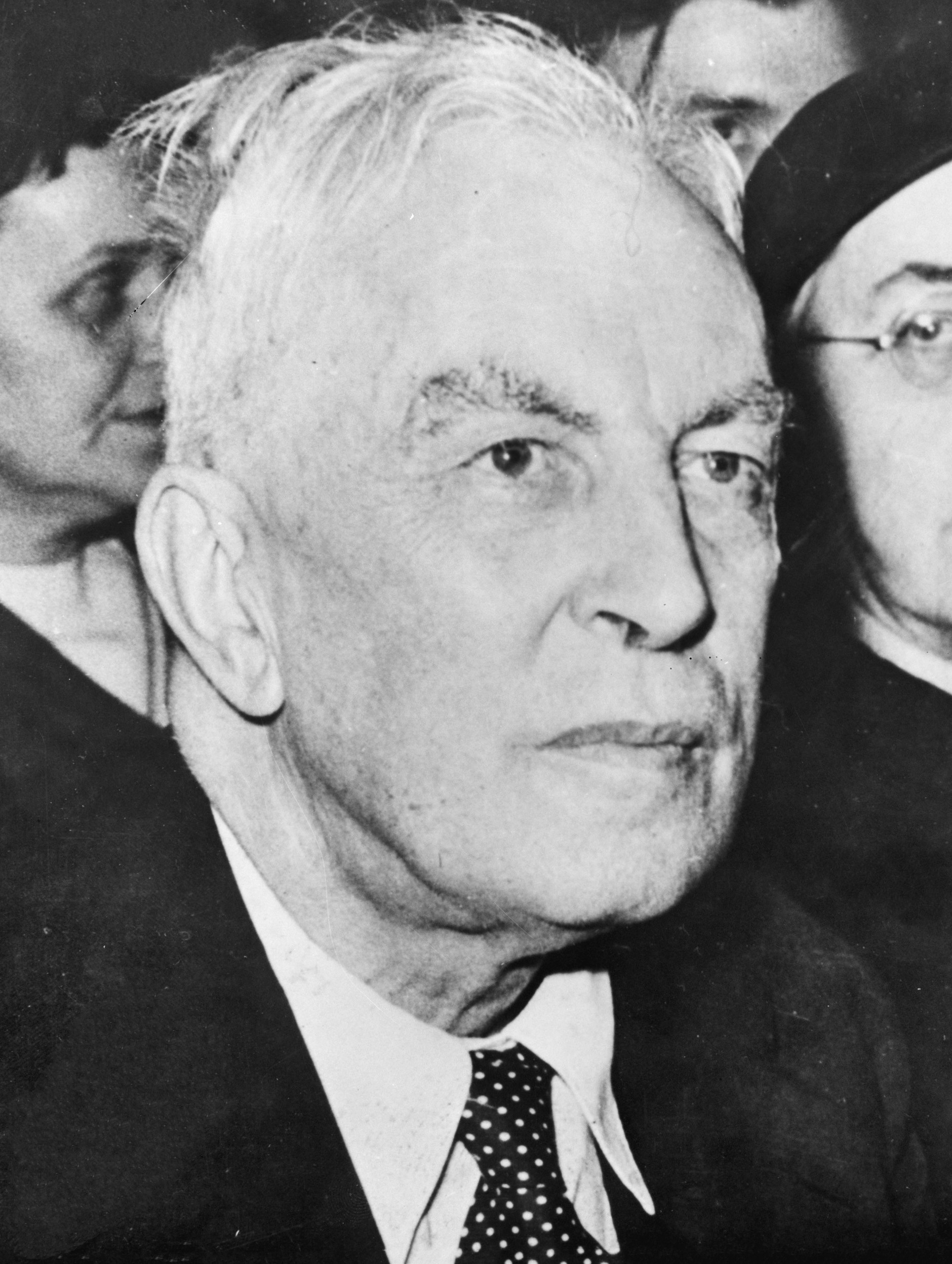
Toynbee

The theme that civilizations flourish or fail according to their responses to the human and environmental challenges that they face, was picked up two thousand years later by Arnold J. Toynbee.

Dionysius of Halicarnassus (c. 60 BCE – after 7 BCE), after praising Rome, anticipated its eventual decay, suggesting the idea of recurring decay in the history of world empires—an idea developed by the Greek historian Diodorus Siculus (1st century BCE) and by Pompeius Trogus, a 1st-century BCE Roman historian from a Celtic tribe in Gallia Narbonensis.

By the late 5th century, Zosimus (also called "Zosimus the Historian"; fl. 490s–510s: a Byzantine historian who lived in Constantinople) could see the writing on the Roman wall, and asserted that empires fell due to internal disunity. He gave examples from the histories of Greece and Macedonia. In Rome's decay, Zosimus saw history repeating itself in its general movements, which he related to the Fates and "astral orbits".

The ancients developed an enduring metaphor for a polity's evolution, drawing an analogy between an individual human's life cycle and developments undergone by a body politic: this metaphor was offered, in varying iterations, by Cicero (106–43 BCE), Seneca (c. 1 BCE – 65 CE), Florus (c. 74 CE – c. 130 CE), and Ammianus Marcellinus (between 325 and 330 CE – after 391 CE). This social-organism metaphor, which has been traced back to the Greek philosopher and polymath Aristotle (384–322 BCE), would recur centuries later in the works of the French philosopher and sociologist Auguste Comte (1798–1857), the English philosopher and polymath Herbert Spencer (1820–1903), and the French sociologist Émile Durkheim (1858–1917).

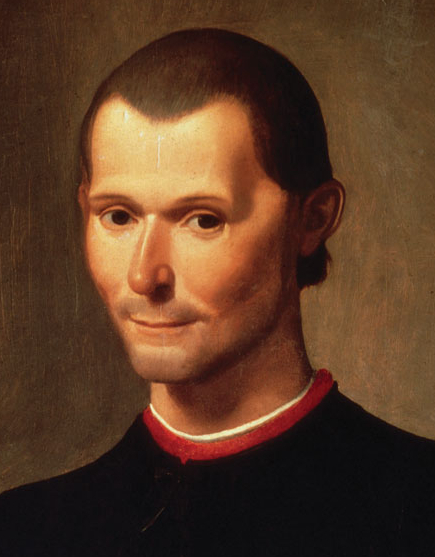
Machiavelli

Niccolò Machiavelli, analyzing the state of Florentine and Italian politics between 1434 and 1494, described recurrent oscillations between "order" and "disorder" within states:

when states have arrived at their greatest perfection, they soon begin to decline. In the same manner, having been reduced by disorder and sunk to their utmost state of depression, unable to descend lower, they, of necessity, reascend, and thus from good they gradually decline to evil and from evil mount up to good.

Machiavelli accounts for this oscillation by arguing that virtù (valor and political effectiveness) produces peace, peace brings idleness (ozio), idleness disorder, and disorder rovina (ruin). In turn, from rovina springs order, from order virtù, and from this, glory and good fortune. Machiavelli, as had the ancient Greek historian Thucydides, saw human nature as remarkably stable—steady enough for the formulation of rules of political behavior. Machiavelli wrote in his Discorsi:

Whoever considers the past and the present will readily observe that all cities and all peoples ... ever have been animated by the same desires and the same passions; so that it is easy, by diligent study of the past, to foresee what is likely to happen in the future in any republic, and to apply those remedies that were used by the ancients, or not finding any that were employed by them, to devise new ones from the similarity of events.

Joshua S. Goldstein suggests that empires, analogously to an individual's midlife crisis, experience a political midlife crisis: after a period of expansion in which all earlier goals are realized, overconfidence sets in, and governments are then likely to attack or threaten their strongest rival. Goldstein cites four examples: the British Empire and the Crimean War; the German Empire and the First World War; the Soviet Union and the Cuban Missile Crisis; the United States and the Vietnam War.

== Historical similarities ==
One "minor case of recurrence thinking" identified by G. W. Trompf involves "the isolation of any two specific events which bear a very striking similarity" and a "preoccupation with parallelism, that is with resemblances, both general and precise, between separate sets of historical phenomena".

In the 18th century, Samuel Johnson wrote that people are "all prompted by the same motives, all deceived by the same fallacies, all animated by hope, obstructed by danger, entangled by desire, and seduced by pleasure".

In The Trouble with History, Adam Michnik writes: "The world is full of inquisitors and heretics, liars and those lied to, terrorists and the terrorized. There is still someone dying at Thermopylae, someone drinking a glass of hemlock, someone crossing the Rubicon, someone drawing up a proscription list."

The Spanish-American philosopher George Santayana observed: "Those who cannot remember the past are condemned to repeat it."

Plutarch's Parallel Lives traces the similarities between pairs of historical figures, one Greek and one Roman.

In 1812, French Emperor Napoleon – born a Corsican outsider – was unprepared for an extended winter campaign yet invaded the Russian Empire, precipitating the fall of the French Empire; and in 1941, German Führer Adolf Hitler – born an Austrian outsider – was unprepared for an extended winter campaign yet invaded the Russian Empire's Soviet successor state, which was ruled by Joseph Stalin, born a Georgian outsider, thus precipitating the fall of the Third Reich.

Mahatma Gandhi worked to liberate his compatriots by peaceful means and was shot dead; Martin Luther King Jr. worked to liberate his compatriots by peaceful means and was shot dead.

Over history, confrontations between peoples – typically, geographical neighbors – help consolidate the peoples into nations, at times into frank empires; until at last, exhausted by conflicts and drained of resources, the once militant polities settle into a relatively peaceful habitus. (Note: Victor Bulmer-Thomas writes: "Imperial retreat is not the same as national decline, as many other countries can attest. Indeed, imperial retreat can strengthen the nation-state just as imperial expansion can weaken it.") Martin Indyk observes: "Wars often don't end until both sides have exhausted themselves and become convinced that they are better off coexisting with their enemies than pursuing a futile effort to destroy them."

Since before recorded history, adverse environmental changes have affected the prosperity and the very survival of human societies. Christopher de Bellaigue writes:

"Like the Maya and the Akkadians we have learned that a broken environment aggravates political and economic dysfunction and that the inverse is also true. Like the Qing we rue the deterioration of our soils. But the lesson is never learned. [...] Denialism [...] is one of the most fundamental of human traits and helps explain our current inability to come up with a response commensurate with the perils we face."

John Vaillant, in reference to the global-warming crisis, writes of "the self-protective tendency to favor the status quo over a potentially disruptive scenario one has not witnessed personally."

Fintan O'Toole writes about American war correspondent Martha Gellhorn (1908–1998):

Her dispatches were not first drafts of history; they were letters from eternity. ... To see history – at least the history of war – in terms of people is to see it not as a linear process but as a series of terrible repetitions ... It is her ability to capture ... the terrible futility of this sameness that makes Gellhorn's reportage so genuinely timeless. [W]e are ... drawn... into the undertow of her distraught awareness that this moment, in its essence, has happened before and will happen again.

Ruth Ben-Ghiat, in Strongmen: Mussolini to the Present (2020), documents the "viral recurrence" around the world, over the past century, of despots and authoritarians "with comparable strategies of control and mendacity".

== See also ==
- The Anatomy of Revolution, by Crane Brinton
- Cliodynamics
- Collapsology
- The Decline of the West, by Oswald Spengler
- Dynastic cycle
- Ecocide
- "First as tragedy, then as farce"
- Eternal return
- The Lessons of History, by Will Durant and Ariel Durant
- List of empires
- List of modern great powers
- Repetition, by Søren Kierkegaard
- Social cycle theory
- Social organism
- Social physics
- Statistics of Deadly Quarrels, by Lewis Fry Richardson
- Thucydides trap

== Sources ==
- Christopher de Bellaigue, "A World Off the Hinges" (review of Peter Frankopan, The Earth Transformed: An Untold History, Knopf, 2023, 695 pp.), The New York Review of Books, vol. LXX, no. 18 (23 November 2023), pp. 40–42.
- Ariel Dorfman, "A Taxonomy of Tyrants" (review of Ruth Ben-Ghiat, Strongmen: Mussolini to the Present, Norton, 2020, 358 pp.), The New York Review of Books, vol. LXVIII, no. 9 (27 May 2021), pp. 25–27.
- Englund, Steven (March 2006). "Napoleon and Hitler". Journal of the Historical Society. 6 (1): 151–169. doi:10.1111/j.1540-5923.2006.00171.x.
- Niall Ferguson, "Ferguson’s Law: Debt Service, Military Spending, and the Fiscal Limits of Power" (working paper), Hoover Institution, Hoover History Lab, Applied History Working Group, 21 February 2025.
- Gordon Graham, "Recurrence," The Shape of the Past, Oxford University Press, 1997, ISBN 0-19-289255-X.
- Freya Johnston, "'I'm coming, my Tetsie!'" (review of Samuel Johnson, edited by David Womersley, Oxford, May 2018, ISBN 978 0 19 960951 2; 1,344 pp.), London Review of Books, vol. 41, no. 9 (9 May 2019), pp. 17-19.
- Paul Kennedy, The Rise and Fall of the Great Powers: Economic Change and Military Conflict from 1500 to 2000, Random House, 1987, ISBN 0-394-54674-1.
- Ibn Khaldun, Muqadimmah, 1377.
- Sherif Khalifa, Geography and the Wealth of Nations, Lexington Books, 2022, ISBN 9781666900521.
- Jackson Lears, "Imperial Exceptionalism" (review of Victor Bulmer-Thomas, Empire in Retreat: The Past, Present, and Future of the United States, Yale University Press, 2018, ISBN 978-0-300-21000-2, 459 pp.; and David C. Hendrickson, Republic in Peril: American Empire and the Liberal Tradition, Oxford University Press, 2017, ISBN 978-0190660383, 287 pp.), The New York Review of Books, vol. LXVI, no. 2 (February 7, 2019), pp. 8–10.
- Morselli, Davide; Passini, Stefano (2010). "Avoiding crimes of obedience: A comparative study of the autobiographies of M. K. Gandhi, Nelson Mandela, and Martin Luther King, Jr". Peace and Conflict: Journal of Peace Psychology. 16 (3): 295–319. doi:10.1080/10781911003773530. ISSN 1532-7949.
- Fintan O'Toole, "A Moral Witness" (review of Janet Somerville, ed., Yours, for Probably Always: Martha Gellhorn's Letters of Love and War, 1930–1949, Firefly, 528 pp.), The New York Review of Books, vol. LXVII, no. 15 (8 October 2020), pp. 29–31.
- Elizabeth Perry, Challenging the Mandate of Heaven: Social Protest and State Power in China, Sharpe, 2002, ISBN 0-7656-0444-2.
- James Romm, ed., Plutarch: Lives that Made Greek History, Hackett, 2012.
- George Santayana, The Life of Reason, vol. 1: Reason in Common Sense, 1905.
- Tom Stevenson, "In the Grey Zone" (review of Eli Berman and David A. Lake, Proxy Wars: Suppressing Violence through Local Agents, Cornell, 2019, ISBN 978 1 50173 306 2; Tyrone L. Groh, Proxy War: The Least Bad Option, Stanford, 2019, ISBN 978 1 5036 0818 4; Andreas Krieg and Jean-Marc Rickli, Surrogate Warfare: The Transformation of War in the 21st Century, Georgetown, 2019, ISBN 978 1 62616 678 3), London Review of Books, vol. 42, no. 20 (22 October 2020), pp. 41–43. "Nuclear weapons – judged, for now at least, to be too powerful to be used – seem to preclude wars of destruction between major powers today." (p. 43.)
- Arnold J. Toynbee, A Study of History, 12 volumes, Oxford University Press, 1934–61.
- Arnold J. Toynbee, "Does History Repeat Itself?" Civilization on Trial, New York, Oxford University Press, 1948.
- G. W. Trompf, The Idea of Historical Recurrence in Western Thought, from Antiquity to the Reformation, Berkeley, University of California Press, 1979, ISBN 0-520-03479-1.
- Mark Twain, The Jumping Frog: In English, Then in French, and Then Clawed Back into a Civilized Language Once More by Patient, Unremunerated Toil, illustrated by F. Strothman, New York and London, Harper & Brothers, Publishers, MCMIII.
- Paul Wilson, "Adam Michnik: A Hero of Our Time," The New York Review of Books, vol. LXII, no. 6 (April 2, 2015), pp. 73–75.
