= G. W. Trompf =

Garry Winston Trompf (born 27 November 1940) is Australian historian, born in Melbourne. He is emeritus professor in the History of Ideas at the University of Sydney and adjunct professor in Peace and Conflict Studies, Faculty of Arts and Social Sciences, University of Sydney.

He is noted for research in the history of ideas, in religious studies, and in the anthropology of Melanesian cultures.

== Academic career ==
Trompf is considered a leading authority on Melanesian religions, and is noted for his development of "retributive logic" and his analysis of historical recurrence (the recurrence of similar events in the rises and falls of empires, in the history of a given polity, or in any two specific events which bear a striking similarity).

== Honors ==
In 2002, Trompf was elected a fellow of the Australian Academy of the Humanities.

== Major publications ==
- The Idea of Historical Recurrence in Western Thought, from Antiquity to the Reformation, Berkeley, University of California Press, 1979, ISBN 0-520-03479-1.
- Melanesian Religion, Cambridge University Press, 2004, ISBN 978-0521607483.
- Payback: The Logic of Retribution in Melanesian Religions, Cambridge University Press, 1994, ISBN 978-0521416917.
- Early Christian Historiography: Narratives of Retribution, Routledge, 2016, ISBN 978-1138180932.
- G.W. Trompf, editor, The Gospel Is Not Western: Black Theologies from the Southwest Pacific, Orbis Books, 1987, ISBN 978-0883442692.
- Early Christian Historiography: Narratives of Retributive Justice (Studies in Religion), Continuum Intl Pub Group, ISBN 978-0826452948.
- Cargo Cults and Millenarian Movements: Transoceanic Comparisons of New Religious Movements, 1st ed., De Gruyter, 2012, ISBN 978-3110874419.
- Friedrich Max Mueller as a Theorist of Comparative Religion, 1st ed., Shakutala Publishing House, 1978.
- Garry Trompf, ed., Islands and Enclaves: Nationalisms and Separatist Pressures in Island and Littoral Contexts, South Asia Books, 1993, ISBN 978-8120711181.
- Garry W. Trompf, co-ed., The Gnostic World, 1st ed., Routledge, 2018, ISBN 978-1317201847.

== See also ==
- Historical recurrence
