= De nostri temporis studiorum ratione =

1708 oration by Gianbattista Vico

De nostri temporis studiorum ratione is the seventh inaugural oration given by Giambattista Vico at the University of Naples, the former six having been given from 1699 to 1707. After being delivered in 1708, it was revised by Vico and published in 1709. The work's title is usually rendered in English as "On the Study Methods of Our Time." Alternatively, scholars refer to the work as the De ratione or De nostri. Given the fact that it refers back to the Jesuit ratio studiorum, Vico's title may be most literally rendered as "The Method of the Studies of our Times."

De ratione is primarily a pedagogical work. Vico sets out to compare classical/ancient learning (viz. the political-philosophical thought of pre-Christian Ancient Greece and Ancient Rome) and modernists (esp. modern jurisprudence, or modern readings of jus/right), drawing the reader's attention to what the two can learn from each other. In doing so, Vico endorses a pedagogical project focused on developing the rhetorical prowess of the individual in contrast to the Cartesian pedagogy widespread among learned circles of his time. This work is widely viewed as an important philosophical precursor to Vico's later works as well as an important standalone work in Vico's thought.

== Main ideas ==
=== Relation to Vico's sixth inaugural address ===
Vico set out to compare the study methods of his period to those of the Ancients, with an eye to developing the importance of rhetoric in enriching the life of the student. De ratione can be viewed as a logical continuation of his sixth inaugural address (given in 1707), which prescribes a particular study method for the student that takes into account the epistemic changes that occur in the student's mind throughout their life. Vico accordingly argued that since individuals' memories and imagination are strongest when they are at their youngest, they are more disposed to the study of languages during childhood. Other fields, such as mathematics, metaphysics, and Christian theology should be studied later in one's life due to their abstract subject-matter as one's mind becomes able to grasp such concepts.

=== The importance of ars topica ===
Vico's central argument in De ratione is fixed on the lack of ars topica, or practices of argumentative eloquence and the use of logical forms in rhetorical contexts, in the pedagogical practices of his day. In a footnote of his introduction to the 1990 edition of De ratione, Elio Gianturco mentions ars topica with respect to Aristotle's Topics, where "topics" in this context are concerned with forms of correct argumentation. In the third section of De Ratione Vico explains this notion:

In our days, instead, philosophical criticism alone is honored. The art of "topics," far from being given first place in the curriculum, is utterly disregarded. Again, I say, this is harmful, since the invention of arguments is by nature prior to the judgment of their validity, so that, in teaching, that invention should be given priority over philosophical criticism. In our days, we keep away from the art of inventing arguments, and think that this skill is of no use. (p. 14)

Gianturco makes note of this central anti-Cartesian remark: "Vico felt that Descartes had completely undermined topics with his theory of the clear and distinct perception." (p. xxxii) For Vico, truth was not only that which could be discerned from rational criticism and methodological inquiries. Instead, truth could be accessed through one's own self-evaluation, improvement, and experience. The pedagogical techniques of the ancients, Vico argued, were better suited to bring to light this aspect of human flourishing despite scientific advancements in medicine, chemistry, and physics. Although knowledge in general can be produced in large amounts with an eye to truthful conclusions using scientific methods, Vico believed that without the correct educational techniques, this knowledge would remain inaccessible to the student deficient in the arts of rhetoric and eloquence.

== Similarities with Vico's other works ==
In his preface to De ratione, Donald Philip Verene states that the work is "widely regarded as the first statement of Vico's original philosophical position as well as a treasure-house of educational ideas." (p. xi) De ratione serves as an initial explication of Vico's pedagogy, jurisprudence, and epistemology as seen in his later works. This includes Vico's De antiquissima sapientia Italorum (On the Most Ancient Wisdom of the Italians) and Scienza Nuova (New Science).

=== La Scienza Nuova ===
Vico's emphasis on imagination and memory in study is echoed in the Scienza Nuova, where these faculties play an integral role in Vico's theory of the development of the mind. For example, in axioms 35-37:

35. Wonder is the daughter of ignorance, and the greater the effect admired, the more the wonder grows in proportion.

36. The more vigorous the imagination, the weaker reasoning is.

37. The most sublime labor of poetry is to give sense and passions to things without sense; and it is a property of children to take inanimate things in their hands and, playing with them, to talk with them as if they were living persons. (p. 86)

Vico identifies poetry as a linguistic expression of sensory qualities, arising from the immediacy of perceptible qualities to one's mind. He uses this to argue that ancient languages, particularly in the form of poetry, provide the most immediate notions of how life was experienced during those periods; hence his seventeenth axiom: "Common ways of speaking should be thought to offer the weightiest of testimony about the ancient customs of peoples, which had currency at the time when their languages were formed." (p. 79)

=== De antiquissima sapientia Italorum ===
In De antiquissima, Vico gives his first formulation of the verum factum principle, or the principle that what is true is convertible with that which is made. It has been argued that De ratione gives an indirect rhetorical basis for this principle, as rhetoric serves as the basis upon which truth can be made and contested in discursive environments. David Marshall in his analysis of Vico's rhetoric notes with regard to the verum factum principle that:

The verum-factum principle appears to be an unlikely case because, for Vico, the clearest example of the convertibility of verum and factum had initially been mathematics, a field in which human beings understood the fundaments precisely because the fundaments were artifacts of human definition. In the De ratione, as is often noted, this thought had precipitated a corollary sentence: if we understand mathematics because we make it, then in order to understand nature we would have to be capable of bringing that into being too. (p. 343)

In this sense, narrative structures serve as bearers of truth-content just as much as the propositions comprising them; being able to narrate something in the first place is an example of having made something to be the case (i.e., the narration itself). Thus, rhetoric and truth are inseparable from each other, in an analogous fashion to the made and the true.

== See also ==
- The New Science
- Giambattista Vico
- Counter-Enlightenment
