= Theologia Poetica =

Theologia Poetica ("poetic theology") was a designation adopted throughout the Renaissance for political philosophy independent of Biblical revelation. In Italy, discussions on "poetic theology" were articulated most notably by Boccaccio and Petrarch, both of whom promoted a philosophical life capable of withstanding the inquisitorial scrutiny of theological orthodoxy.

The Italian appeal to poetic theology finds its historical consummation in the works of Giambattista Vico, and most notably in his Scienza Nuova (1730 and 1744), where the political philosopher highlights the independence of pre-philosophical poetic theologians ("authors of gentile nations") from Biblical revelation, and thus too, Christianity's sacred history. Vico argues at length that the "authors" (autori) of civil society preceded by far its "writers" (scrittori), so that a problematic hiatus separates the two, as it does things and the records we have of them in words. Vico's enterprise consists of discovering the inherence of order in things—and of "right in human nature"—lest order and right be conceived as merely imposed upon things by "writers" according to their whims (a placito), as is the case with all dogmatic theology, but also—so argues Vico already in his De Antiquissima Italorum Sapientia—with modern "science," insofar as it identifies what is true with what is "most certain" (certissima).

While Vico's references to "poet theologians" (poeti teologi) point overtly to pre-philosophical authorities, Vico presents himself, if only tacitly or obliquely, as a poet theologian in his own right. In this respect, as Paolo Cristofolini has shown, Vico recognizes himself as a "new Dante," or a poet theologian who is at once a philosopher. Vico's own Scienza Nuova presents itself—most notably in the first and last paragraphs of the work—as discovering the providence of a "metaphysical" human mind in the world of human wills (animi umani). If our own intellect (intelligenza) is at work in us prior to our recognizing it (indeed even when we live as brutes), philosophy too must "covertly" precede sensory experience as the hidden author of our world (hence Vico's dictum, included in his De Antiquissima Italorum Sapientia, Ch. VII.3, to the effect that just as God is the artifex of nature, so is man the God of artifices: ut Deus sit naturae artifex, homo artificiorum Deus).

== See also ==
- Theopoetics
- Poiesis

== External resources ==
- www.theologiapoetica.webs.com
