= The New Science =

Written work by Giambattista Vico

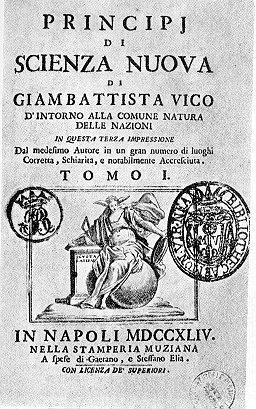
- Title page of the 1744 edition.
- Author: Giambattista Vico
- Original title: La Scienza Nuova
- Language: Italian
- Subject: Philosophy of history
- Published: 1725, 1730, 1744 (Stamperia Muziana)
- Publication place: Italy
- Media type: Print (hardback)

The New Science (Italian: La Scienza Nuova pronounced [la ʃˈʃɛntsa ˈnwɔːva]) is the major work of Italian philosopher Giambattista Vico.

It was first published in 1725 to little success, but has gone on to be highly regarded and influential in the philosophy of history, sociology, and anthropology. The central concepts were highly original and prefigured the Age of Enlightenment.

== Titles ==
The full title of the 1725 edition was Principj di una Scienza Nuova Intorno alla Natura delle Nazioni per la Quale si Ritruovano i Principj di Altro Sistema del Diritto Naturale delle Genti, ending with a dedication to Cardinal Lorenzo Corsini, the future Pope Clement XII. Principj and ritruovano being archaic spellings of principi and ritrovano, the title may be loosely translated "Principles of a New Science Concerning the Nature of Nations, through Which Are Recovered the Principles of Another System of the Natural Law of Peoples".

The 1730 edition was titled Cinque Libri di Giambattista Vico de' Principj d' una Scienza Nuova d'Intorno alla Comune Natura della Nazioni ("Giambattista Vico's Five Books on the Principles of a New Science Concerning Nations' Shared Nature"), ending with a dedication to Clement XII.

The 1744 edition was slightly emended to Principj di Scienza Nuova di Giambattista Vico d'Intorno alla Comune Natura delle Nazioni ("Giambattista Vico's Principles of New Science Concerning Nations' Shared Nature"), without a title page dedication. Clement had died in 1740 and Vico in 1744, before the edition's publication.

== Creation ==
In 1720, Vico began work on the Scienza Nuova as part of a treatise on universal rights. Although it was originally supposed to be sponsored by Cardinal Corsini, Vico was forced to finance the publication himself after the cardinal pleaded financial difficulty and withdrew his patronage. It was the first work by Vico to be written in Italian, since his previous ones had been in Latin.

The first edition of the New Science appeared in 1725. Vico worked on two heavily revised editions. The first was published in 1730, the second posthumously in 1744. The English translated version was published in 1948.

== Approach, style and tone ==
In its first section, titled "Idea of the Work" (Idea dell'Opera), the 1730 and 1744 editions of The New Science explicitly present themselves as a "science of reasoning" (scienza di ragionare). The work (especially the section "Of the Elements") includes a dialectic between axioms (authoritative maxims or degnità) and "reasonings" (ragionamenti) linking and clarifying the axioms.

Vico began the third edition with a detailed close reading of a front piece portrait, examining the place of Gentile nations within the providential guidance of the Hebrew God. This portrait contains a number of images that are symbolically ascribed to the flow of human history. A triangle with the Eye of Providence appears in the top left. A beam of light from the eye shines upon a brooch attached to the breastplate of “the lady with the winged temples who surmounts the celestial globe or world of nature” (center right), which represents metaphysics. The beam reflects off the brooch onto the back of a robed character standing upon a pedestal (bottom left), representing the poet Homer. All around these main characters resides a variety of objects that represent the stages of human history which Vico categorizes into three epochs: the age of the gods “in which the gentiles believed they lived under divine governments, and everything was commanded them by auspices and oracles, which are the oldest institutions in profane history; the age of the heroes "in which they reigned everywhere in aristocratic commonwealths, on account of a certain superiority of nature which they held themselves to have over the plebs (or peasants);" and the age of men "in which all men recognized themselves as equal in human nature, and therefore there were established first the popular commonwealths and then the monarchies, both of which are forms of human government." By viewing these principles as universal phenomena which combined nature and government with language and philology, Vico could insert the history of the Gentile nations into the supreme guidance by divine providence. According to Vico, the proper end for government resulted with society entering into a state of universal equity: "The last type of jurisprudence was that of natural equity, which reigns naturally in the free commonwealths, in which the people, each for his own particular good (without understanding that it is the same for all), are led to command universal laws. They naturally desire these laws to bend benignly to the least details of matters calling for equal unity."

Vico specifies that his "science" reasons primarily about the function of religion in the human world ("Idea of the Work"), and in this respect the work "comes to be a civil theology reasoned from divine providence" (vien ad essere una teologia civile ragionata della provvidenza divina). Reconsidering divine providence within a human or political context, Vico unearths the "poetic theologians" (poeti teologi) of pagan antiquity, exposing the poetic character of theology independently of Christianity's sacred history and thus of Biblical authority. Vico's use of poetic theology, anticipated in his 1710 work De Antiquissima Italorum Sapientia ("On the Ancient Wisdom of the Italians"), confirms his ties to the Italian Renaissance and its own appeals to theologia poetica. With the early Renaissance, Vico shares the call for recovering a "pagan" or "vulgar" horizon for philosophy's providential agency or for recognizing the providence of our human "metaphysical" minds (menti) in the world of our "political" wills (animi). "Poetic theology" would serve as stage for an "ascent" to recognize the inherence or latency of rational agency in our actions, even when these are brutal. This way, the particular providence of the Bible's "true God" would not be required for the thriving of properly human life. All that would be needed was (A) false religions and false gods and (B) the covert work of the conatus (the rational principle of a constitution of experience rooted in its proper infinite form), which was examined at length in De Antiquissima Italorum Sapientia and evoked again in the section "Of the Method" in the 1730 and 1744 editions of The New Science.

== Cyclical history (Corsi e ricorsi) ==
Vico is often seen as espousing a cyclical history where human history is created by man, although Vico never speaks of "history without attributes" (Paolo Cristofolini, Vice Pagano e Barbaro), but of a "world of nations". Which is more, in the 1744 Scienza Nuova (esp. the "Conclusion of the Work") Vico stresses that "the world of nations" is made by men merely with respect to their sense of certainty (certamente), though not fundamentally, insofar as the world is guided by the human mind "metaphysically" independent of its makings (compare opening paragraph of the Scienza Nuova). Furthermore, although Vico is often attributed the expression "corsi e ricorsi" (cycles and counter cycles of growth and decay) of "history", he never speaks in the plural of "the cycle" or of "the counter-cycle" (ricorso) of "human things", suggesting that political life and order, or human creations, are oriented "backward," as it were, or called back to their constitutive "metaphysical" principle.

On present day "constructivist" readings, Vico is supposed to have promoted a vision of man and society as moving in parallel from barbarism to civilization.

As societies become more developed socially, human nature also develops, and both manifest their development in changes in language, myth, folklore, economy, etc.; in short, social change produces cultural change.

Vico would therefore be using an original organic idea that culture is a system of socially produced and structured elements. Hence, knowledge of any society would come from the social structure of that society, explicable, therefore, only in terms of its own language. As such, one may find a dialectical relationship between language, knowledge and social structure.

Relying on a complex etymology, Vico argues in the Scienza Nuova that civilization develops in a recurring cycle (ricorso) of three ages: the divine, the heroic, and the human. Each age exhibits distinct political and social features and can be characterized by master tropes or figures of language. The giganti of the divine age rely on metaphor to compare, and thus comprehend, human and natural phenomena. In the heroic age, metonymy and synecdoche support the development of feudal or monarchic institutions embodied by idealized figures. The final age is characterized by popular democracy and reflection via irony; in this epoch, the rise of rationality leads to barbarie della reflessione or barbarism of reflection, and civilization descends once more into the poetic era. Taken together, the recurring cycle of three ages – common to every nation – constitutes for Vico a storia ideale eterna or ideal eternal history. Therefore, it can be said that all history is the history of the rise and fall of civilizations, for which Vico provides evidence (up until, and including the Graeco-Roman historians).

== Ideas on rhetoric applied to history ==
Vico's humanism (his returning to a pre-modern form of reasoning), his interest in classical rhetoric and philology, and his response to Descartes contribute to the philosophical foundations for the second Scienza Nuova. Through an elaborate Latin etymology, Vico establishes not only the distinguishing features of first humans, but also how early civilization developed out of a sensus communis or common (not collective) sense. Beginning with the first form of authority intuited by the giganti or early humans and transposed in their first "mute" or "sign" language, Vico concludes that “first, or vulgar, wisdom was poetic in nature.” This observation is not an aesthetic one, but rather points to the capacity inherent in all men to imagine meaning via comparison and to reach a communal "conscience" or "prejudice" about their surroundings. The metaphors that define the poetic age gradually yield to the first civic discourse, finally leading to a time characterized by "full-fledged reason" (ragione tutta spiegata), in which reason and right are exposed to the point that they vanish into their own superficial appearance. At this point, speech returns to its primitive condition, and with it men. Hence the "recurring" (ricorso) of life to "barbarism" (barbarie). It is by way of warning his age and those stemming from it of the danger of seeking truth in clear and distinct ideas blinding us to the real depths of life, that Vico calls our attention back to a classical art of moderating the course of human things, lest the liberty enjoyed in the "Republic" be supplanted by the anarchic tyranny of the senses.

Crucial to Vico's work remains a subtle criticism of all attempts to impose universality upon particularity, as if ex nihilo. Instead, Vico attempts to always let "the true" emerge from "the certain" through innumerable stories and anecdotes drawn mostly from the history of Greece and Rome and from the Bible. Here, reason does not attempt to overcome the poetic dimension of life and speech, but to moderate its impulses so as to safeguard civil life.

While the transfer from divine to heroic to human ages is, for Vico, marked by shifts in the tropological nature of language, the inventional aspect of the poetic principle remains constant. When referring to “poets”, Vico intends to evoke the original Greek sense of “creators”. In the Scienza Nuova, then, the verum factum principle first put forth in De Italorum Sapientia remains central. As such, the notion of topics as the loci or places of invention (put forth by Aristotle and developed throughout classical rhetoric) serves as the foundation for "the true", and thus, as the underlying principle of sensus communis and civic discourse. The development of laws that shape the social and political character of each age is informed as much by master tropes as by those topics deemed acceptable in each era. Thus, for the rudimentary civilization of the divine age, sensory topics are employed to develop laws applicable on an individual basis. These laws expand as metonymy and synecdoche enable notions of sovereign rule in the heroic age; accordingly, acceptable topics expand to include notions of class and division. In the final, human age, the reflection that enables popular democracy requires appeals to any and all topics to achieve a common, rational law that is universally applicable. The development of civilization in Vico's storia ideale eterna, then, is rooted in the first canon of rhetoric, as invention via loci shapes both the creation of and discourse about civil life.

== Reception and later influence ==
Vico's major work was poorly received during his own life but has since inspired a cadre of famous thinkers and artists, including Karl Marx and Montesquieu. Later his work was received more favourably as in the case of Lord Monboddo to whom he was compared in a modern treatise.

Isaiah Berlin has devoted attention to Vico as a critic of the Enlightenment and a significant humanist and culture theorist.

Scienza Nuova was included by Martin Seymour-Smith in his book The 100 Most Influential Books Ever Written.

The historical cycle provides the structure for James Joyce's book, Finnegans Wake. The intertextual relationship between Scienza Nuova and Finnegans Wake was brought to light by Samuel Beckett in his essay "Dante... Bruno. Vico.. Joyce” published in Our Exagmination Round His Factification for Incamination of Work in Progress (1929), where Beckett argued that Vico's conception of language also had significant influence in Joyce's work. Vico's notion of the lingua mentale commune (mental dictionary) in relation to universale fantastico reverberates in Joyce's novel, which ends in the middle of a sentence, reasserting Vico's principle of cyclical history.

In A. S. Byatt's 1990 novel Possession the initial example of the (fictional) poets' correspondence which drives the plot is found in a copy of Scienza Nuova. Some of Vico's ideas are discussed in relation to the characters' motivation.

== See also ==
- Recapitulation theory
- De nostri temporis studiorum ratione
- Antipositivism
- Historicism
- Sociology of knowledge
