= Correa Moylan Walsh =

American scholar (1862–1936)

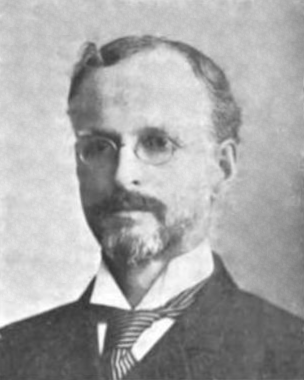
- Born: September 23, 1862; Newburgh, New York, US
- Died: March 10, 1936 (aged 73); New York, New York, US
- Education: Harvard University; Balliol College, Oxford
- Occupations: Economist, author

Correa Moylan Walsh (September 23, 1862 – March 10, 1936) was an American author. He was an early expert in the field of index numbers.

== Biography ==
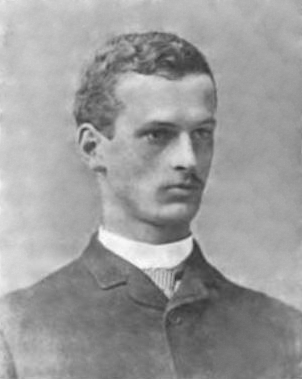
As a Harvard undergraduate

Correa Moylan Walsh was born in Newburgh, New York on September 23, 1862. He graduated from Harvard University in 1884.

A polymath, he wrote on a wide range of topics: from mathematics, economics, and statistics, on the one hand (that of mathematics and the mathematical sciences) to theology, philosophy, political science, literature, and philosophy of history, on the other (that of the humanities and social sciences).

He died in Manhattan on March 10, 1936.

== Books ==
- The Measurement of General Exchange-Value. (New York: The Macmillan Company; London: Macmillan & Co., 1901)
- The Fundamental Problem in Monetary Science. (New York: The Macmillan Company; London: Macmillan & Co., 1903)
- Shakespeare's Complete Sonnets: A New Arrangement With Introduction and Notes. (London and Leipsic: T. Fisher Unwin, 1908)
- The Doctrine of Creation. (London: T. Fisher Unwin, 1910)
- The Political Science of John Adams: A Study in the Theory of Mixed Government and the Bicameral System. (New York and London: G. P. Putnam's Sons, 1915)
- The Climax of Civilisation. (New York: Sturgis & Walton Company, 1917)
- Socialism. (New York: Sturgis & Walton Company, 1917)
- Feminism. (New York: Sturgis & Walton Company, 1917)
- The Problem of Estimation; A Seventeenth-Century Controversy and its Bearing on Modern Statistical Questions, Especially Index-Numbers. (London: P.S. King & Son, 1921)
- The Four Kinds of Economic Value. (Cambridge: Harvard University Press, 1926)
- An Attempted Proof of Fermat's Last Theorem By A New Method. (New York: G. E. Stechert & co., 1932)

== Articles ==
- Shaw's History of Currency. (Quarterly Journal of Economics, July, 1896)
- The Steadily Appreciating Standard. (Quarterly Journal of Economics, April, 1897)
- Kant's Transcendental Idealism and Empirical Realism. (Mind, October, 1903, and January, 1904)
- Franklin and Plato. (The Open Court, March, 1906)
- The Best Form of Index Number: Discussion. (Quarterly Publications of the American Statistical Association, March, 1921)
- Professor Edgeworth's View on Index-Numbers. (Quarterly Journal of Economics, May, 1924)
