= Giambattista Vico =

Italian philosopher (1668–1744)

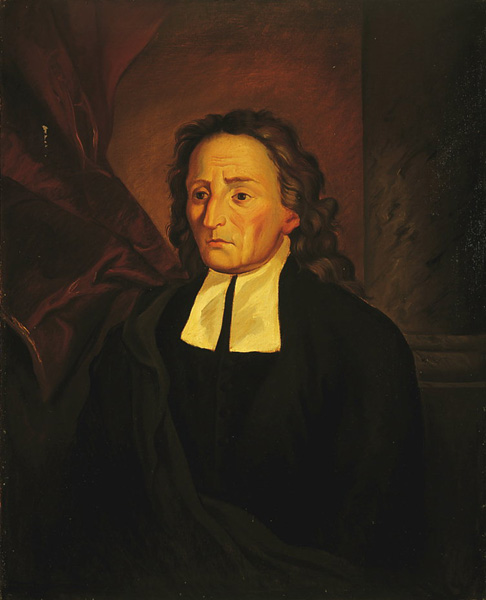
- Born: Giovanni Battista Vico; 23 June 1668; Naples, Kingdom of Naples
- Died: 23 January 1744 (aged 75); Naples, Kingdom of Naples

Education
- Education: University of Naples (UJD, 1694)

Philosophical work
- Era: 18th-century philosophy
- Region: Western philosophy; Italian philosophy
- School: Christian humanism; Counter-Enlightenment; Italian Enlightenment; Natural law; Perspectivism
- Institutions: University of Naples
- Main interests: Epistemology, humanities, jurisprudence, philosophy of history, philosophy of science, poetry (Theologia Poetica), political philosophy, rhetoric
- Notable works: Principî di Scienza Nuova; De antiquissima Italorum sapientia
- Notable ideas: Class struggle; Criticism of rationalism and reductionism; Humanities as human science or social science; Ideal eternal history; Philosophy of history; Theory of political mythology; "Verum esse ipsum factum" (an early form of constructivist epistemology)

Giambattista Vico (born Giovanni Battista Vico /ˈviːkoʊ/; Italian: [ˈviːko]; 23 June 1668 – 23 January 1744) was an Italian philosopher, rhetorician, historian, and jurist during the Italian Enlightenment. He criticized the expansion and development of modern rationalism, finding Cartesian analysis and other types of reductionism impractical to human life, and he was an apologist for classical antiquity and the Renaissance humanities, in addition to being the first expositor of the fundamentals of social science and of semiotics. He is recognised as one of the first Counter-Enlightenment figures in history.

The Latin aphorism "Verum esse ipsum factum" ("truth is itself something made") coined by Vico is an early instance of constructivist epistemology. He inaugurated the modern field of the philosophy of history, and, although the term philosophy of history is not in his writings, Vico spoke of a "history of philosophy narrated philosophically." Although he was not an historicist, contemporary interest in Vico usually has been motivated by historicists, such as Isaiah Berlin, a philosopher and historian of ideas, and Hayden White, a metahistorian.

Vico's intellectual magnum opus is the book Scienza Nuova or New Science (1725), which attempts a systematic organization of the humanities as a single science that records and explains the historical cycles by which societies rise and fall.

== Biography ==
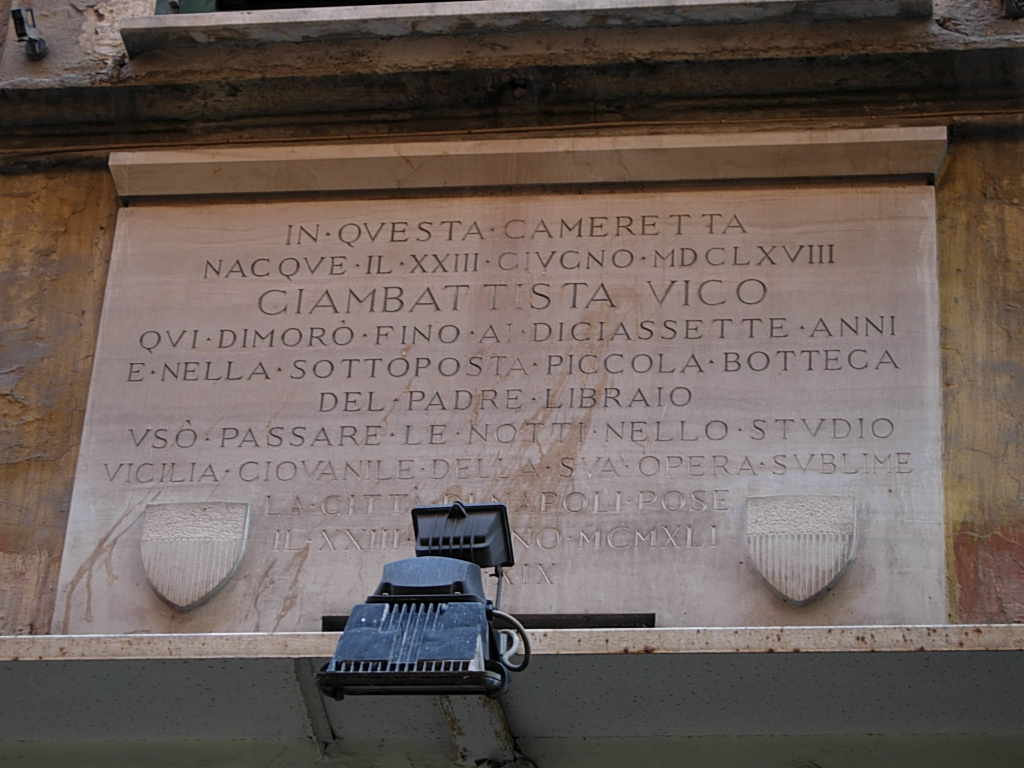
"In this little room Giambattista Vico was born on June 23 1668. Here he resided until he was seventeen years old, and in the subdued little workshop of his bookseller father he used to spend the nights in his study. Youthful eve of his sublime work. The city of Naples poses." Tombstone in the house where he was born in Via San Biagio dei Librai.

Born to a bookseller in Naples, Italy, Giovanni Battista Vico attended several schools, but ill health and dissatisfaction with the scholasticism of the Jesuits led to his being educated at home by tutors. Evidence from his autobiographical work indicates that Vico likely was an autodidact educated under paternal influence, during a three-year absence from school, consequence of an accidental fall when the boy was seven years old. Giovanni Battista's formal education was at the University of Naples from which he graduated in 1694, as Doctor of Civil and Canon Law.

In 1686, after surviving a bout of typhus, he accepted a job as a tutor, in Vatolla, south of Salerno, which became a nine-year professional engagement that lasted till 1695. Four years later, in 1699, Vico married Teresa Caterina Destito, a childhood friend, and accepted a chair in rhetoric at the University of Naples, which he held until ill-health retirement, in 1741. Throughout his academic career, Vico would aspire to, but never attain, the more respectable chair of jurisprudence; however, in 1734, he was appointed historiographer royal, by Charles III, King of Naples, at a salary greater than he had earned as a university professor.

== The rhetoric and humanism of Vico ==
Vico's version of rhetoric is a product of his humanistic and pedagogic concerns. In the 1708 commencement speech De Nostri Temporis Studiorum Ratione (On the Order of the Scholarly Disciplines of Our Times), Vico said that whoever "intends a career in public life, whether in the courts, the senate, or the pulpit" should be taught to "master the art of topics and [to] defend both sides of a controversy, be it on Nature, Man, or politics, in a freer and brighter style of expression, so he can learn to draw on those arguments which are most probable and have the greatest degree of verisimilitude"; yet, in Scienza Nuova, Vico denounced defending both sides in controversies as false eloquence.

As Royal Professor of Latin Eloquence, Vico prepared students for higher studies in the fields of Law and of Jurisprudence; thus, his lessons were about the formal aspects of the canon of rhetoric, including the arrangement and the delivery of an argument. Yet he chose to emphasize the Aristotelian connection of rhetoric with logic and dialectic, thereby placing ends (rhetoric) at their center. Vico's objection to modern rhetoric is that it is disconnected from common sense (sensus communis), defined as the "worldly sense" that is common to all men.

In lectures and throughout the body of his work, Vico's rhetoric begins from a central argument (medius terminus), which is to be clarified by following the order of things as they arise in our experience. Probability and circumstance retain their proportionate importance, and discovery—reliant upon topics (loci)—supersedes axioms derived through reflective, abstract thought. In the tradition of classical Roman rhetoric, Vico sets out to educate the orator (rhetorician) as the transmitter of the oratio, a speech with ratio (reason) at the centre. What is essential to the oratorical art (Gr. ῥητορική, rhētorikē) is the orderly link between common sense and an end commensurate with oratory; an end that is not imposed upon the imagination from above (in the manner of the moderns and dogmatic Christianity), but that is drawn from common sense, itself. In the tradition of Socrates and Cicero, Vico's true orator will be midwife to the birth of "the true" (as an idea) from "the certain", the ignorance in the mind of the student.

Rediscovery of "the most ancient wisdom" of the senses, a wisdom that is humana stultitia ("human foolishness"), Vico's emphases on the importance of civic life and of professional obligations are in the humanist tradition. He would call for a maieutic oratory art against the grain of the modern privilege of the dogmatic form of reason, in what he called the "geometrical method" of René Descartes and the logicians at the Port-Royal-des-Champs abbey.

== Response to the Cartesian method ==
As he relates in his autobiography, Vico returned to Naples from Vatolla to find "the physics of Descartes at the height of its renown among the established men of letters." Developments in both metaphysics and the natural sciences abounded as the result of Cartesianism. Widely disseminated by the Port Royal Logic of Antoine Arnauld and Pierre Nicole, Descartes's method was rooted in verification: the only path to truth, and thus knowledge, was through axioms derived from observation. Descartes's insistence that the "sure and indubitable" (or, "clear and distinct") should form the basis of reasoning had an obvious impact on the prevailing views of logic and discourse. Studies in rhetoric—indeed all studies concerned with civic discourse and the realm of probable truths—met with increasing disdain.

Vico's humanism and professional concerns prompted an obvious response that he would develop throughout the course of his writings: the realms of verifiable truth and human concern share only a slight overlap, yet reasoning is required in equal measure in both spheres. One of the clearest and earliest forms of this argument is available in the De Italorum Sapientia, where Vico argues that

to introduce geometrical method into practical life is "like trying to go mad with the rules of reason", attempting to proceed by a straight line among the tortuosities of life, as though human affairs were not ruled by capriciousness, temerity, opportunity, and chance. Similarly, to arrange a political speech according to the precepts of geometrical method is equivalent to stripping it of any acute remarks and to uttering nothing but pedestrian lines of argument.

Vico's position here and in later works is not that the Cartesian method is irrelevant, but that its application cannot be extended to the civic sphere. Instead of confining reason to a string of verifiable axioms, Vico suggests (along with the ancients) that appeals to phronēsis (φρόνησις or practical wisdom) must also be made, and likewise appeals to the various components of persuasion that comprise rhetoric. Vico would reproduce this argument consistently throughout his works, and would use it as a central tenet of the Scienza Nuova.

== The principle of verum factum ==
Vico is best known for his verum factum principle, first formulated in 1710 as part of his De antiquissima Italorum sapientia, ex linguae latinae originibus eruenda (1710) ("Of the most ancient wisdom of the Italians, unearthed from the origins of the Latin language"). The principle states that truth is verified through creation or invention and not, as per Descartes, through observation: "The criterion and rule of the true is to have made it. Accordingly, our clear and distinct idea of the mind cannot be a criterion of the mind itself, still less of other truths. For while the mind perceives itself, it does not make itself." This criterion for truth would later shape the history of civilization in Vico's opus, the Scienza Nuova (The New Science, 1725), because he would argue that civil life—like mathematics—is wholly constructed.

== The Scienza Nuova ==
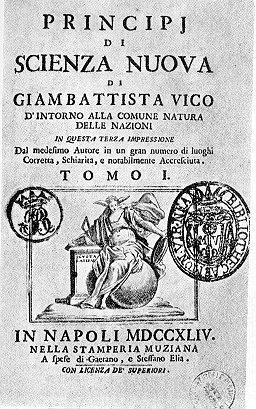
Title page of Principj di Scienza Nuova (1744 edition)

The New Science (1725, Scienza Nuova) is Vico's major work. It has been highly influential in the philosophy of history, and for historicists such as Isaiah Berlin and Hayden White.

== Influence ==
Samuel Beckett's first published work, in the selection of critical essays on James Joyce entitled Our Exagmination Round His Factification for Incamination of Work in Progress, is "Dante... Bruno. Vico... Joyce". In it, Beckett sees a profound influence of Vico's philosophy and poetics—as well the cyclical form of the Scienza Nuova—on the avant-garde compositions of Joyce, and especially the titular Work in Progress, viz. Finnegans Wake.

In Knowledge and Social Structure (1974), Peter Hamilton identified Vico as the "sleeping partner" of the Age of Enlightenment. Despite having been relatively unknown in his 18th-century time, and read only in his native Naples, the ideas of Vico are predecessors to the ideas of the intellectuals of the Enlightenment. Moreover, recognition of Vico's intellectual influence began in the 19th century, when the French Romantic historians used his works as methodological models and guides.

In Capital: Critique of Political Economy (1867), Karl Marx's mention of Vico indicates their parallel perspectives about history, the role of historical actors, and an historical method of narrative. Marx and Vico saw social-class warfare as the means by which men achieve the end of equal rights; Vico called that time the "Age of Men". Marx concluded that such a state of affairs is the optimal end of social change in a society, but Vico thought that such complete equality of rights would lead to socio-political chaos and the consequent collapse of society. In that vein, Vico proposed a social need for religion, for a supernatural divine providence to keep order in human society.

Arriving at Vico through both Marx and Michelet, the French philosopher Georges Sorel (1847–1922) used the Neapolitan philosopher's epistemology to develop an anti-determinist account of social scientific explanation. Insisting on the verum ipsum factum principle, Sorel developed a notion of social science as the study of how human groups produce institutions, cultures, and other forms of social relations, rather than as a search for causal laws capable of explaining historical developments. Through Vico, Sorel also further developed his interest in collective psychology and popular imagination. In the context of a discussion of Marxist theory, Sorel used Vico's insights to develop the idea that any material condition that influences a social formation is always mediated by this psychological layer. This severely limited the plausibility of economic determinism.

In Orientalism (1978), Edward Said asserted that he was influenced by Vico, and that his "ideas anticipate and later infiltrate the line of German thinkers I am about to cite. They belong to the era of Herder and Wolff, later to be followed by Goethe, Humboldt, Dilthey, Nietzsche, Gadamer, and finally the great twentieth century Romance philologists Erich Auerbach, Leo Spitzer, and Ernst Robert Curtius." As a humanist and early philologist, Vico allegedly represented "a different, alternative model that has been extremely important to me in my work", which differed from supposedly mainstream Western prejudice against the Orient and the "standardization" that came with modernity and culminated in National Socialism. Said argued that the interdependence of human history and culture facilitates the scholars' task to "take seriously Vico's great observation that men make their own history, that what they can know is what they have made, and extend it to geography" and contended that "as both geographical and cultural entities—to say nothing of historical entities—such locales, regions, and geographical sectors as 'Orient' and 'Occident' are man-made." His views have been criticized by Ibn Warraq as historically negationist, scientifically denialist, and antithetical to the Western philosophy that Giambattista Vico represents.

== Works ==
- Opere di G. B. Vico. Fausto Nicolini (ed.), Bari: Laterza, 1911–41.
- De nostri temporis studiorum ratione (1708)
- De Antiquissima Italorum Sapientia ex Linguae Originibus Eruenda Libri Tres (On the Most Ancient Wisdom of the Italians Unearthed from the Origins of the Latin Language). 1710, Palmer, L. M., trans. Ithaca: Cornell UP, 1988.
- Institutiones Oratoriae (The Art of Rhetoric). 1711–1741, Pinton, Girogio, and Arthur W. Shippee, trans. Amsterdam: Editions Rodopi B.V., 1984.* "On Humanistic Education", trans. Giorgio A. Pinton and Arthur W. Shippee. Ithaca: Cornell UP, 1993.
- On the Study Methods of Our Time, trans. Elio Gianturco. Ithaca: Cornell UP, 1990.
- Universal right (Diritto universale). Translated from Latin and Edited by Giorgio Pinton and Margaret Diehl. Amsterdam/New York, Rodopi, 2000
- On the Most Ancient Wisdom of the Italians: Unearthed from the Origins of the Latin Language, trans. L. M. Palmer. Ithaca, Cornell UP, 1988.
- Scienza Nuova (The First New Science). 1725, Pompa, Leon, trans. Cambridge: Cambridge UP, 2002.
- The New Science of Giambattista Vico, (1744). trans. Thomas G. Bergin and Max H. Fisch. Ithaca: Cornell UP, 2nd ed. 1968.
- De rebus gestis Antonj Caraphaei (1713×1715), trans. Giorgio A. Pinton, Statecraft: The Deeds of Antonio Carafa (Peter Lang, 2004), a biography of Antonio Carafa (died 1693).

== See also ==
- Finnegans Wake
- Historic recurrence
- New Vico Studies (Institute for Vico Studies at Emory University)
- Recapitulation theory
