= Kurt F. Reinhardt =

American Germanist, philosopher, and educator

- Born: November 6, 1896; Munich, German Empire
- Died: June 13, 1983 (aged 86); Palo Alto, United States
- Education: Ludwig-Maximilians-Universität München; Heidelberg University; University of Freiburg
- Scientific career
- Fields: German studies
- Workplaces: University of Oregon; Stanford University

Kurt Frank Reinhardt (November 6, 1896 – June 13, 1983) was a German-born American Germanist, philosopher and educator who was Professor at the Department of Modern European Languages and of the German Studies Department at Stanford University from 1930 to 1962.

== Biography ==
Kurt Frank Reinhardt was born in Munich on November 6, 1896. He attended the classical gymanisum in Mannheim, and subsequently studied literature, philosophy, and art history at the Ludwig-Maximilians-Universität München, Heidelberg University and the University of Freiburg. During World War I, he worked as a dramaturge. Since 1925, he worked for Verlag Herder, a major German publisher. During this time, Reinhardt was a correspondent for the Frankfurter Allgemeine Zeitung.

From 1928 to 1930, Reinhardt taught German literature at the University of Oregon. From 1930 to 1962, he was professor at the Department of Modern European Languages and of the German Studies Department at Stanford University. Reinhardt died in Palo Alto on June 13, 1983.

== Works ==
- Germany: 2000 years, 1950
- The Existentialist Revolt, 1952

== Sources ==
- Krukemeyer, Manfred (2014). Kultur der Medizin: Spuren, Wege und Ziele. Schattauer Verlag. p. 256. ISBN 9783794530908.
