= Philosophy of history =

Philosophical study of history and its discipline

Philosophy of history is the philosophical study of history and its discipline. The term was coined by the French philosopher Voltaire.

In contemporary philosophy a distinction has developed between the speculative philosophy of history and the critical philosophy of history, now referred to as analytic. The split between these approaches may be approximately compared, by analogy and on the strength of regional and academic influences, to the schism in commitments between analytic and continental philosophy wherein the analytic approach is pragmatic and the speculative approach attends more closely to a metaphysics (or anti-metaphysics) of determining forces like language or the phenomenology of perception at the level of background assumptions.

At the level of practice, the analytic approach questions the meaning and purpose of the historical process whereas the speculative approach studies the foundations and implications of history and the historical method. The names of these are derived from C. D. Broad's distinction between critical philosophy and speculative philosophy.

The divergence between these approaches crystallizes in the disagreements between Hume and Kant on the question of causality. Hume and Kant may be viewed in retrospect—by expressive anachronism—as analytic and speculative, respectively. Historians like Foucault or Hannah Arendt, who tend to be spoken of as theorists or philosophers before they are acknowledged as historians, may largely be identified with the speculative approach whereas generic academic history tends to be cleave to analytic and narrative approaches.

== Origins ==
In his Poetics, Aristotle (384–322 BCE) maintained the superiority of poetry over history because poetry speaks of what ought or must be true rather than merely what is true.

Herodotus, a fifth-century BCE contemporary of Socrates, broke from the Homeric tradition of passing narrative from generation to generation in his work "Investigations" (Ancient Greek: Ἱστορίαι; Istoríai), also known as Histories. Herodotus, regarded by some as the first systematic historian, and, later, Plutarch (46–120 CE) freely invented speeches for their historical figures and chose their historical subjects with an eye toward morally improving the reader. History was supposed to teach good examples for one to follow. The assumption that history "should teach good examples" influenced how writers produced history.

From the Classical period to the Renaissance, historians' focus alternated between subjects designed to improve mankind and a devotion to fact. History was composed mainly of hagiographies of monarchs and epic poetry describing heroic deeds such as The Song of Roland—about the Battle of Roncevaux Pass (778) during Charlemagne's first campaign to conquer the Iberian Peninsula.

In the fourteenth century, Ibn Khaldun, whom George Sarton considered one of the first philosophers of history, discussed his philosophy of history and society in detail in his Muqaddimah (1377). His work represents a culmination of earlier works by medieval Islamic sociologists in the spheres of Islamic ethics, political science, and historiography, such as those of al-Farabi (c. 872 – c. 950), Ibn Miskawayh, al-Dawani, and Nasir al-Din al-Tusi (1201–1274). Ibn Khaldun often criticized "idle superstition and uncritical acceptance of historical data". He introduced a scientific method to the philosophy of history (which Dawood considers something "totally new to his age") and he often referred to it as his "new science", which is now associated with historiography. His historical method also laid the groundwork for the observation of the role of the state, communication, propaganda, and systematic bias in history.

By the eighteenth century historians had turned toward a more positivist approach—focusing on fact as much as possible, but still with an eye on telling histories that could instruct and improve. Starting with Fustel de Coulanges (1830–1889) and Theodor Mommsen (1817–1903), historical studies began to move towards a more modern scientific form. In the Victorian era, historiographers debated less whether history was intended to improve the reader, and more on what causes turned history and how one could understand historical change.

== Concepts ==
=== Philosophy of chronology ===
Many ancient cultures held mythical and theological concepts of history and of time that were not linear. Such societies saw history as cyclical, with alternating Dark and Golden Ages. Plato taught the concept of the Great Year, and other Greeks spoke of aeons. Similar examples include the ancient doctrine of eternal return, which existed in Ancient Egypt, in the Indian religions, among the Greek Pythagoreans' and in the Stoics' conceptions. In his Works and Days, Hesiod described five Ages of Man: the Golden Age, the Silver Age, the Bronze Age, the Heroic Age, and the Iron Age, which began with the Dorian invasion. Some scholars identify just four ages, corresponding to the four metals, with the Heroic age as a description of the Bronze Age. A four-age count would match the Vedic or Hindu ages known as Satya Yuga, Treta Yuga, Dvapara Yuga and Kali Yuga, which together make one Yuga Cycle that repeats. According to Jainism, this world has no beginning or end but goes through cycles of upturns (utsarpini) and downturns (avasarpini) constantly. Many Greeks believed that just as mankind went through four stages of character during each rise and fall of history so did government. They considered democracy and monarchy as the healthy régimes of the higher ages; and oligarchy and tyranny as corrupted régimes common to the lower ages.

In the East, cyclical theories of history developed in China (as a theory of dynastic cycle) and in the Islamic world in the Muqaddimah of Ibn Khaldun (1332–1406).

During the Renaissance, cyclical conceptions of history would become common, with proponents illustrating decay and rebirth by pointing to the decline of the Roman Empire. Machiavelli's Discourses on Livy (1513–1517) provide an example. The notion of Empire contained in itself ascendance and decadence, as in Edward Gibbon's The History of the Decline and Fall of the Roman Empire (1776), which the Roman Catholic Church placed on the Index Librorum Prohibitorum (List of Prohibited Books).

During the Age of Enlightenment, history began to be seen as both linear and irreversible. Condorcet's interpretations of the various "stages of humanity" and Auguste Comte's positivism were among the most important formulations of such conceptions of history, which trusted social progress. As in Jean-Jacques Rousseau's Emile (1762) treatise on education (or the "art of training men"), the Enlightenment conceived the human species as perfectible: human nature could be infinitely developed through a well-thought pedagogy.

Cyclical conceptions continued in the nineteenth and twentieth centuries in the works of authors such as Oswald Spengler (1880–1936), Correa Moylan Walsh (1862–1936), Nikolay Danilevsky (1822–1885), Claude Lévi-Strauss (1908–2009), and Paul Kennedy (1945– ), who conceived the human past as a series of repetitive rises and falls. Spengler, like Butterfield, when writing in reaction to the carnage of the First World War of 1914–1918, believed that a civilization enters upon an era of Caesarism after its soul dies. Spengler thought that the soul of the West was dead and that Caesarism was about to begin.

=== Philosophy of causality ===
Narrative and causal approaches to history have often been contrasted or even opposed to one another, yet they can also be viewed as complementary. Some philosophers of history such as Arthur Danto have claimed that "explanations in history and elsewhere" describe "not simply an event—something that happens—but a change". Like many practicing historians, they treat causes as intersecting actions and sets of actions which bring about "larger changes", in Danto's words: to decide "what are the elements which persist through a change" is "rather simple" when treating an individual's "shift in attitude", but "it is considerably more complex and metaphysically challenging when we are interested in such a change as, say, the break-up of feudalism or the emergence of nationalism".

Much of the historical debate about causes has focused on the relationship between communicative and other actions, between singular and repeated ones, and between actions, structures of action or group and institutional contexts and wider sets of conditions. John Lewis Gaddis has distinguished between exceptional and general causes (following Marc Bloch) and between "routine" and "distinctive links" in causal relationships: "in accounting for what happened at Hiroshima on August 6, 1945, we attach greater importance to the fact that President Truman ordered the dropping of an atomic bomb than to the decision of the Army Air Force to carry out his orders." He has also pointed to the difference between immediate, intermediate and distant causes. For his part, Christopher Lloyd puts forward four "general concepts of causation" used in history: the "metaphysical idealist concept, which asserts that the phenomena of the universe are products of or emanations from an omnipotent being or such final cause"; "the empiricist (or Humean) regularity concept, which is based on the idea of causation being a matter of constant conjunctions of events"; "the functional/teleological/consequential concept", which is "goal-directed, so that goals are causes"; and the "realist, structurist and dispositional approach, which sees relational structures and internal dispositions as the causes of phenomena".

There is disagreement about the extent to which history is ultimately deterministic. Some argue that geography, economic systems, or culture prescribe laws that determine the events of history. Others see history as a sequence of consequential processes that act upon each other. Even determinists do not rule out that, from time to time, certain cataclysmic events occur to change the course of history. Their main point is, however, that such events are rare and that even apparently large shocks like wars and revolutions often have no more than temporary effects on the evolution of the society.

=== Philosophy of neutrality ===
The question of neutrality concerns itself foremost with analysis of historiography and the biases of historical sources. One prominent manifestation of this analysis is the idea that "history is written by the victors".

G. W. F. Hegel adopts the expression "Die Weltgeschichte ist das Weltgericht" ("World history is a tribunal that judges the world", a quote from Friedrich Schiller's poem Resignation, published in 1786) and asserts that history is what judges men and women, their actions, and their opinions. Since the twentieth century, Western historians have disavowed the aspiration to provide a judgement of history. The goals of historical judgements or interpretations are separate from those of legal judgements, which need to be formulated quickly after the events and be final.

In his Collège de France lectures published as Society Must Be Defended, Michel Foucault posits that the victors of a social struggle use their political dominance to suppress a defeated adversary's version of historical events in favor of their own propaganda, which may go so far as historical negationism. Wolfgang Schivelbusch's Culture of Defeat takes an opposing approach that defeat is a major driver for the defeated to reinvent himself, while the victor, confirmed in his attitudes and methods, dissatisfied by the high losses and paltry gains made, may be less creative and fall back.

Related to the issues of historical judgement are those of the pretension to neutrality and objectivity. Analytic and critical philosophers of history have debated whether historians should express judgements on historical figures, or if this would infringe on their supposed role. In general, positivists and neopositivists oppose any value-judgement as unscientific.

=== Narrative ===
Another important aspect in the philosophy or writing of history is that of constructing certain historical narratives, or intertwined events/stories describing a specific event. History can be described as a cohesive and evidence-grounded presentation of the events, people, and ideologies that have occurred over a time period/place for an extended length of time, whereas "narratives" are to give a description of how a specific event unfolded and what/who caused it. Selectivity is another big factor in constructing a narrative; what do we consider "significant" or "trivial" in making our stories of an event? Additionally, there may be many truthful, airtight, and rigorous interpretations/narratives for a single event, for which they may contradict each other.

== Operative theories ==
=== Teleological approaches ===
Early teleological approaches to history can be found in theodicies, which attempted to reconcile the problem of evil with the existence of God—providing a global explanation of history with belief in a progressive directionality organized by a superior power, leading to an eschatological end, such as a Messianic Age or Apocalypse. However, this transcendent teleological approach can be thought as immanent to human history itself. Augustine of Hippo, Thomas Aquinas, Jacques-Bénigne Bossuet, in his 1679 Discourse On Universal History, and Gottfried Leibniz, who coined the term, formulated such philosophical theodicies. Leibniz based his explanation on the principle of sufficient reason, which states that anything that happens, does happen for a specific reason. Thus, if one adopts God's perspective, seemingly evil events in fact only take place in the larger divine plan. In this way theodicies explained the necessity of evil as a relative element that forms part of a larger plan of history. However, Leibniz's principles were not a gesture of fatalism. Confronted with the antique problem of future contingents, Leibniz developed the theory of compossible worlds, distinguishing two types of necessity, in response to the problem of determinism.

G. W. F. Hegel may represent the epitome of teleological philosophy of history. Hegel's teleology was taken up by Francis Fukuyama in his The End of History and the Last Man. Thinkers such as Nietzsche, Michel Foucault, Althusser, or Deleuze deny any teleological sense to history, claiming that it is best characterized by discontinuities, ruptures, and various time-scales, which the Annales School claimed to have demonstrated.

Schools of thought influenced by Hegel also see history as progressive, but they see progress as the outcome of a dialectic in which factors working in opposite directions are over time reconciled. History was best seen as directed by a Zeitgeist, and traces of the Zeitgeist could be seen by looking backward. Hegel believed that history was moving man toward civilization, and some also claim he thought that the Prussian state incarnated the end of history. In his Lessons on the History of Philosophy, he explains that each epochal philosophy is in a way the whole of philosophy; it is not a subdivision of the Whole but this Whole itself apprehended in a specific modality.

=== Georg Wilhelm Friedrich Hegel ===
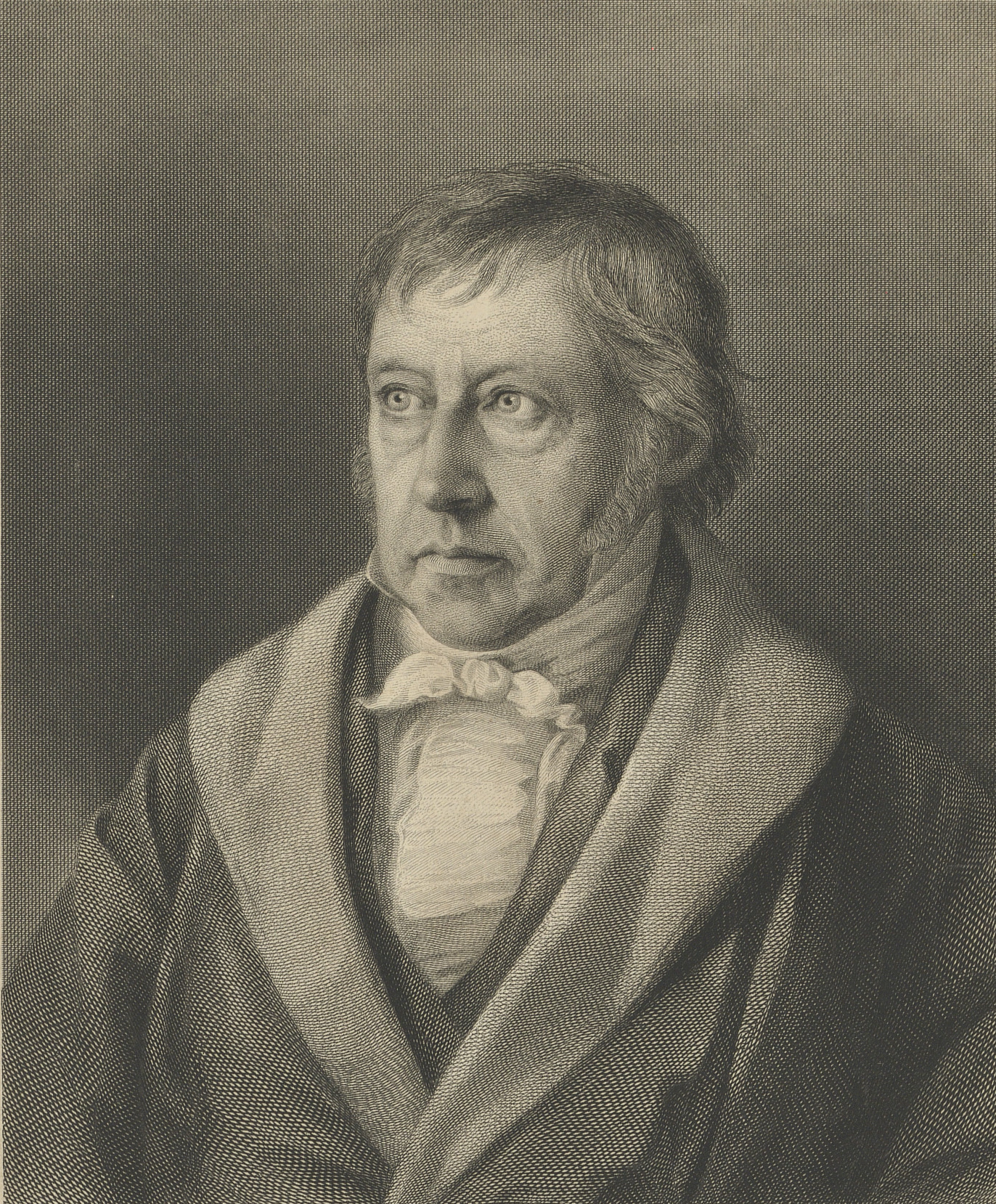
Georg Wilhelm Friedrich Hegel, philosopher of absolute idealism who developed a dialectic conception of history

Lectures on the Philosophy of World History bring together the theses of the philosophy of history that Hegel developed during his classes at the University of Berlin taught in the years 1822–1823, 1828 and 1830–1831. Editions of the work by Eduard Gans in 1837, Charles Hegel in 1840 and Georg Lasson in 1917 stand out. Hegel's work presents a complex exposition of his theses, which can lead to more than one mistake. For this reason, a series of works have been written aimed at interpreting the writings of the German philosopher, including his philosophy of history, which has been considered one of his clearest works.

Hegel's philosophy of history aimed for a philosophical reflection on world history, thinking about the history of humanity in all its spatial and temporal breadth. This Hegelian particularity, versus the works of historians, rests on the fact that the German philosopher sought to determine what the teleology of history was, particularly what the end of history was, and how that process would develop. With this end in mind, Hegel applied his philosophical system, both metaphysical and logical, to develop the thesis that the history of humanity consists of a rational process of constant progress towards freedom.

According to Hegelian philosophy, reason made a spatial transition from east to west, that is, from Asia to Europe. This transition of reason, says Hegel, is made explicit in the concept of freedom that each civilization developed in these spaces has had. Thus, in the east, the Chinese civilization, India, and the various civilizations of Mesopotamia were characterized by considering that freedom belonged to a single subject, that person being understood as the emperor or empress, the king or queen. The rest of the individuals in these civilizations are, according to Hegel, like children under the tutelage of a father. The second stage of this transition of freedom overcame the paternal stage. Greece and Rome, civilizations where freedom no longer belonged only to the head of the state, but also to a limited number of people who met certain requirements, that is, the citizens. Finally, the third stage, German-Christian Europe, reached a level of consciousness about freedom that maintains that it no longer belonged to one or a few; on the contrary, freedom was good for all human beings.

The reactions that Hegel's thesis generated have been diverse. On the one hand, it is argued that Hegel's contribution consisted of consolidating the philosophy of history as an independent and formal discipline of philosophy. On the other hand, it is argued that Hegel's philosophy of history is an example of totalitarianism, racism, and Eurocentrism, widely debated criticisms.

=== Thomas Carlyle ===
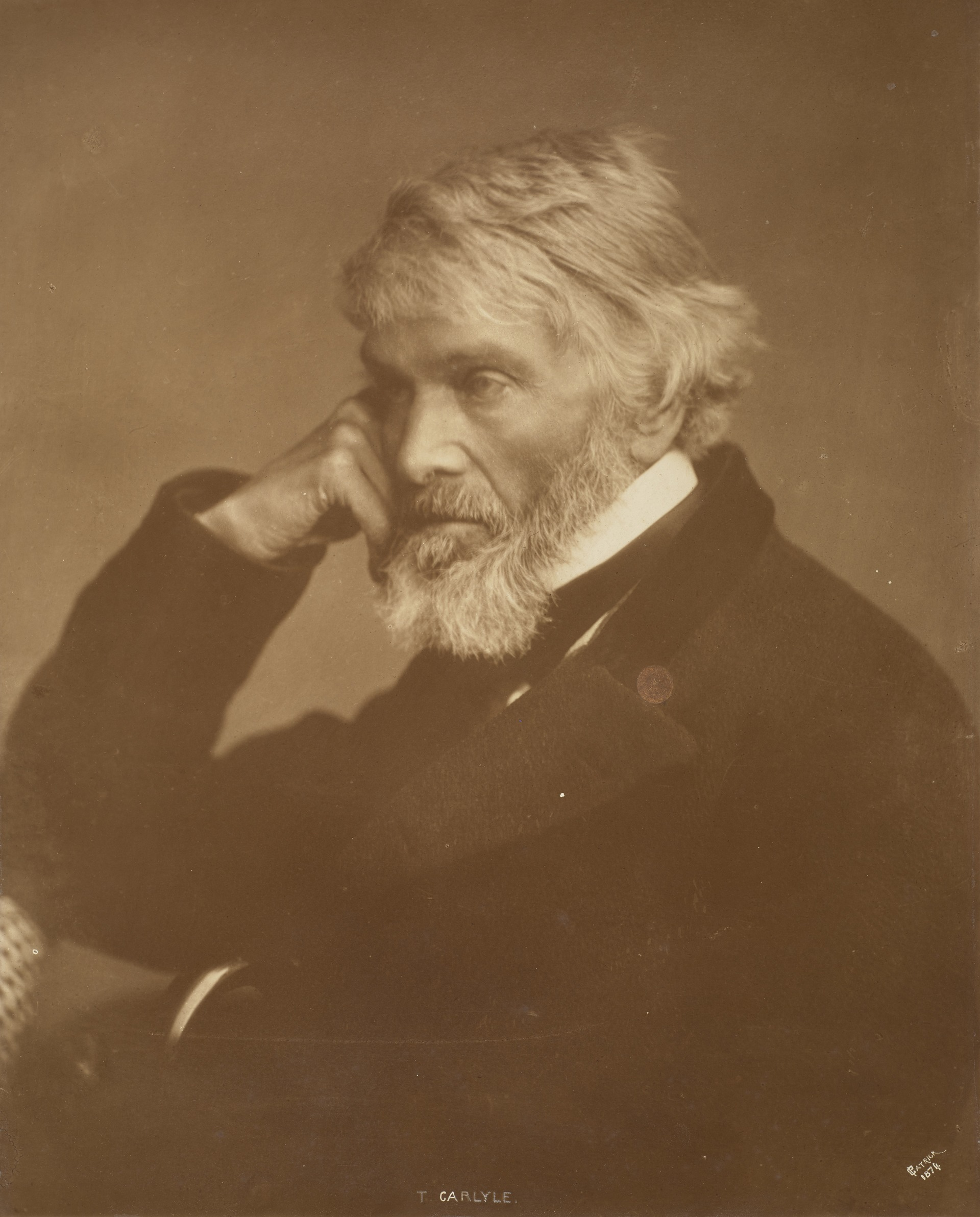
Thomas Carlyle, Scottish essayist, historian and philosopher of the great man theory

After Hegel, who insisted on the role of great men in history, with his famous statement about Napoleon, "I saw the Spirit on his horse", Thomas Carlyle argued that history was the biography of a few central individuals, heroes, such as Oliver Cromwell or Frederick the Great, writing that "The History of the world is but the Biography of great men." His view of heroes included not only political and military figures, the founders or topplers of states, but artists, poets, theologians and other cultural leaders. His history of great men, of geniuses, sought to organize change in the advent of greatness.

Explicit defenses of Carlyle's position have been rare since the late twentieth century. Most philosophers of history contend that the motive forces in history can best be described only with a wider lens than the one he used for his portraits. A.C. Danto, for example, wrote of the importance of the individual in history, but extended his definition to include social individuals, defined as "individuals we may provisionally characterize as containing individual human beings amongst their parts. Examples of social individuals might be social classes ..., national groups ..., religious organizations ..., large-scale events ..., large-scale social movements ..., etc." The great man theory of history was most popular with professional historians in the nineteenth century; a popular work of this school is the Encyclopædia Britannica Eleventh Edition (1911), which contains lengthy and detailed biographies about the great men of history. (Note: See, for example, the biography of Attila the Hun of the Migrations Period.)

After Marx's conception of a materialist history based on the class struggle, which raised attention for the first time to the importance of social factors such as economics in the unfolding of history, Herbert Spencer wrote "You must admit that the genesis of the great man depends on the long series of complex influences which has produced the race in which he appears, and the social state into which that race has slowly grown. . . . Before he can remake his society, his society must make him."

=== Social evolutionism ===
Inspired by the Enlightenment's ideal of progress, social evolutionism became a popular conception in the nineteenth century. Auguste Comte's (1798–1857) positivist conception of history, which he divided into the theological stage, the metaphysical stage and the positivist stage, brought upon by modern science, was one of the most influential doctrines of progress. The Whig interpretation of history, as it was later called, associated with scholars of the Victorian and Edwardian eras in Britain, such as Henry Maine or Thomas Macaulay, gives an example of such influence, by looking at human history as progress from savagery and ignorance toward peace, prosperity, and science. Maine described the direction of progress as "from status to contract," from a world in which a child's whole life is pre-determined by the circumstances of his birth, toward one of mobility and choice.

The publication of Darwin's The Origin of Species in 1859 introduced human evolution. However, it was quickly transposed from its original biological field to the social field, in social Darwinist theories. Herbert Spencer, who coined the term "survival of the fittest", or Lewis Henry Morgan in Ancient Society (1877) developed evolutionist theories independent from Darwin's works, which would be later interpreted as social Darwinism. These nineteenth-century unilineal evolution theories claimed that societies start out in a primitive state and gradually become more civilised over time, and equated the culture and technology of Western civilisation with progress.

Arthur Gobineau's An Essay on the Inequality of the Human Races (1853–55) argued that race is the primary force determining world events, that there are intellectual differences between human races, and that civilizations decline and fall when the races are mixed. Gobineau's works had a large popularity in the so-called scientific racism theories that developed during the New Imperialism period.

After the first world war, and even before Herbert Butterfield (1900–1979) harshly criticized it, the Whig interpretation had gone out of style. The bloodletting of that conflict had indicted the whole notion of linear progress. Paul Valéry famously said: "We civilizations now know ourselves mortal."

However, the notion itself didn't completely disappear. The End of History and the Last Man (1992) by Francis Fukuyama proposed a similar notion of progress, positing that the worldwide adoption of liberal democracies as the single accredited political system and even modality of human consciousness would represent the "End of History". Fukuyama's work stems from a Kojevian reading of Hegel's Phenomenology of Spirit (1807).

Unlike Maurice Godelier who interprets history as a process of transformation, Tim Ingold suggests that history is a movement of autopoiesis.

== Contextual theories ==
As early as the 18th century, philosophers began focusing on contextual factors contributing to the course of history. Historians of the Annales School, founded in 1929 by Lucien Febvre and Marc Bloch, were a major landmark in the shift from a history centered on individual subjects to studies concentrating in geography, economics, demography, and other social forces. Fernand Braudel's studies on the Mediterranean Sea as "hero" of history and Emmanuel Le Roy Ladurie's history of climate were inspired by this school.

=== Karl Marx ===
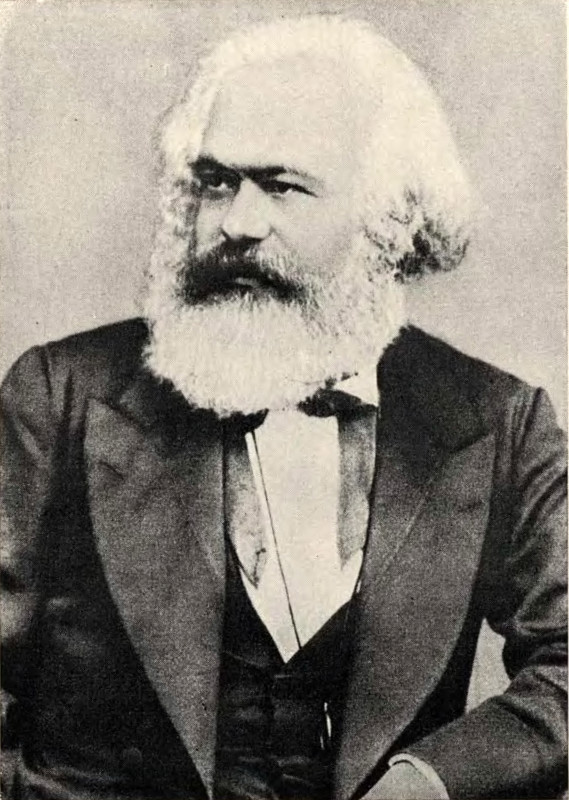
Karl Marx, founder of Marxism and historical materialism

Karl Marx is often thought to be an exponent of economic determinism. For him social institutions like religion, culture and the political system were merely by-products of the underlying economic system. However, he did not see history as completely deterministic. His essay The Eighteenth Brumaire of Louis Napoleon contains the most famous formulation of Marx's view of the role of the individual in history:

Men make their own history, but they do not make it just as they please; they do not make it under circumstances chosen by themselves, but under given circumstances directly encountered and inherited from the past.

=== Michel Foucault ===
The historico-political discourse analyzed by Michel Foucault in Society Must Be Defended (1975–76) considers truth as the fragile product of a historical struggle, first conceptualized as race struggle—understood not in the modern sense of biological race but closer to that of a people or nation. Boulainvilliers, for example, was an exponent of nobility rights. He claimed that the French nobility were the racial descendants of the Franks who invaded France (while the Third Estate was descended from the conquered Gauls), and had right to power by virtue of right of conquest. He used this approach to formulate a historical thesis of the course of French political history—a critique of both the monarchy and the Third Estate. Foucault regards him as the founder of the historico-political discourse as political weapon.

In Great Britain, this historico-political discourse was used by the bourgeoisie, the people and the aristocracy as a means of struggle against the monarchy—cf. Edward Coke or John Lilburne. In France, Boulainvilliers, Nicolas Fréret, and then Sieyès, Augustin Thierry, and Cournot reappropriated this form of discourse. Finally, at the end of the nineteenth century, this discourse was incorporated by racialist biologists and eugenicists, who gave it the modern sense of race and, even more, transformed this popular discourse into a state racism in Nazism. Foucault also presents that Marxists too seized this discourse and took it in a different direction, transforming the essentialist notion of race into the historical notion of class struggle, defined by socially structured position. This displacement of discourse constitutes one of the bases of Foucault's thought—that discourse is not tied to the subject, rather the subject is a construction of discourse. Moreover, discourse is not the simple ideological and mirror reflexion of an economic infrastructure, but is a product and the battlefield of multiples forces—which may not be reduced to the simple dualist contradiction of two energies.

Foucault shows that what specifies this discourse from the juridical and philosophical discourse is its conception of truth—that truth is no longer absolute, it is the product of race struggle. History itself, which was traditionally the sovereign's science, the legend of his glorious feats and monument building, ultimately became the discourse of the people, thus a political stake. The subject is not any more a neutral arbitrator, judge, or legislator, as in Solon's or Kant's conceptions. Therefore, what became the historical subject must search in history's furor, under the "juridical code's dried blood", the multiple contingencies from which a fragile rationality temporarily finally emerged. This may be, perhaps, compared to the sophist discourse in Ancient Greece. Foucault warns that it has nothing to do with Machiavelli's or Hobbes's discourse on war, for to this popular discourse, the sovereign is nothing more than "an illusion, an instrument, or, at the best, an enemy. It is a discourse that beheads the king, anyway that dispenses itself from the sovereign and that denounces it".

== Other approaches ==
=== Narrative history ===
A current popular conception considers the value of narrative in the writing and experience of history. Important thinkers in this area include Paul Ricœur, Louis Mink, W.B. Gallie, and Hayden White. Some have doubted this approach because it draws fictional and historical narrative closer together, and there remains a perceived "fundamental bifurcation between historical and fictional narrative" (Ricœur, vol. 1, 52). In spite of this, most modern historians such as Barbara Tuchman or David McCullough consider narrative writing important to their approaches. The theory of narrated history (or historicized narrative) holds that the structure of lived experience, and such experience narrated in both fictional and non-fictional works (literature and historiography) have in common the figuration of "temporal experience." In this way narrative can "'grasp together' and integrate ... into one whole and complete story" the "composite representations" of historical experience (Ricœur x, 173). Ricœur in particular views historical narratives in terms of memetics. Louis Mink writes that "the significance of past occurrences is understandable only as they are locatable in the ensemble of interrelationships that can be grasped only in the construction of narrative form" (148). Marxist theorist Fredric Jameson also analyzes historical understanding this way, and writes that "history is inaccessible to us except in textual form ... it can be approached only by way of prior (re)textualization" (82).

== Education and propaganda ==
Since Plato's Republic, civic education and instruction has had a central role in politics and the constitution of a common identity. History has thus sometimes become the target of propaganda, for example in historical revisionist attempts. Plato's insistence on the importance of education was relayed by Rousseau's Emile: Or, On Education (1762), a counterpart to The Social Contract (1762). Public education has been seen by republican regimes and the Enlightenment as a prerequisite of the masses' progressive emancipation, as conceived by Kant in Was Ist Aufklärung? (What Is Enlightenment?, 1784).

Modern education systems, instrumental in the construction of nation states, also involved the elaboration of a common, national history. History textbooks are one way through which this common history was transmitted. Le Tour de France par deux enfants, for example, was the French Third Republic's classic textbook for elementary school: it described the story of two French children who, following the German annexation of the Alsace-Lorraine region in 1870, go on a tour de France during which they become aware of France's diversity and the existence of the various patois.

== See also ==
- Historical significance
- Historic recurrence
- Historiography
- Historiosophy
- Journal of the Philosophy of History
- Philosophy of time
- Political philosophy
- Social philosophy
- Teleology
- Teleonomy
- Truth
- Victor's justice
