= National Register of Historic Places listings in Crawford County, Kansas =

Location of Crawford County in Kansas

This is a list of the National Register of Historic Places listings in Crawford County, Kansas.

This is intended to be a complete list of the properties and districts on the National Register of Historic Places in Crawford County, Kansas, United States. The locations of National Register properties and districts for which the latitude and longitude coordinates are included below may be seen on a map.

There are 23 properties and districts listed on the National Register in the county.

This National Park Service list is complete through NPS recent listings posted May 1, 2026.

== Current listings ==
	Name on the Register	Image	Date listed	Location	City or town	Description
1	Besse Hotel	Besse Hotel	April 16, 2008 (#08000300)	121 E. 4th St. 37°31′14″N 94°50′36″W	Pittsburg	
2	Carver Social League		April 30, 2024 (#100010297)	1007 South Elm Street; 37°23′56″N 94°42′06″W	Pittsburg	
3	Cato District No. 4 School		September 6, 2006 (#06000771)	Junction of 200th St. and 720th Ave. 37°40′01″N 94°44′30″W	Cato	
4	Colonial Fox Theatre	Colonial Fox Theatre	April 16, 2008 (#08000301)	409 N. Broadway; 37°24′40″N 94°42′17″W	Pittsburg	
5	Crawford County Courthouse	Crawford County Courthouse	April 22, 2009 (#09000225)	111 E. Forest, Courthouse Square; 37°30′39″N 94°50′36″W	Girard	
6	First Presbyterian Church	First Presbyterian Church	July 8, 2009 (#09000496)	202 N. Summit; 37°30′39″N 94°50′36″W	Girard	
7	Fourth and Broadway Historic District		October 11, 2016 (#16000703)	401-424 N. Broadway, 105 and 121 E. 4th Sts. 37°24′41″N 94°42′17″W	Pittsburg	
8	Franklin Sidewalk	Franklin Sidewalk	March 16, 2007 (#07000143)	Parallel to Business Route 69 between Franklin and Arma; 37°32′00″N 94°42′17″W	Franklin	
9	Frisco Freight Depot		July 10, 2017 (#100001286)	210 E. 4th St. 37°24′40″N 94°42′09″W	Pittsburg	
10	Girard Carnegie Library	Girard Carnegie Library	June 25, 1987 (#87000952)	128 W. Prairie; 37°30′37″N 94°50′42″W	Girard	
11	Hotel Stilwell	Hotel Stilwell	April 30, 1980 (#80001464)	707 Broadway; 37°24′51″N 94°42′19″W	Pittsburg	
12	Hudgeon Bridge		July 2, 1985 (#85001433)	10 miles south and 3.2 miles west of Girard; 37°22′08″N 94°53′56″W	Girard	
13	J.T and Anna Leonard House	J.T and Anna Leonard House	January 11, 2017 (#100000505)	211 N. Summit St. 37°30′44″N 94°50′37″W	Girard	
14	Little Walnut Creek Bowstring		January 4, 1990 (#89002174)	Over Little Walnut Creek, northeast of Walnut; 37°38′43″N 95°02′45″W	Walnut	
15	Pittsburg Foundry & Machine Company		January 6, 2022 (#100007281)	104 North Locust St. 37°24′32″N 94°42′12″W	Pittsburg	
16	Pittsburg Public Library	Pittsburg Public Library	November 9, 1977 (#77000577)	4th and Walnut Sts. 37°24′40″N 94°42′26″W	Pittsburg	
17	J. E. Raymond House		April 3, 2007 (#07000255)	301 Osage St. 37°30′28″N 94°50′43″W	Girard	
18	S-W Supply Company	S-W Supply Company	May 21, 2009 (#09000348)	215 E. Prairie Ave. 37°30′34″N 94°50′29″W	Girard	
19	St. John's Episcopal Church	St. John's Episcopal Church	April 22, 2009 (#09000226)	Southeastern corner of Buffalo and Summit; 37°30′29″N 94°50′35″W	Girard	
20	State Bank of Girard	State Bank of Girard	August 7, 2009 (#09000349)	105 E. Prairie; 37°30′34″N 94°50′36″W	Girard	
21	Washington Grade School		April 16, 2008 (#08000302)	209 S. Locust St. 37°24′26″N 94°42′12″W	Pittsburg	
22	Julius A. Wayland House	Julius A. Wayland House	November 21, 1976 (#76000819)	721 N. Summit; 37°31′14″N 94°50′36″W	Girard	
23	Whitesitt-Shirk Historic District	Whitesitt-Shirk Historic District	March 20, 2002 (#02000204)	116 E. Lindburg and 120 E. Lindburg; 37°23′31″N 94°42′15″W	Pittsburg	

== See also ==
- List of National Historic Landmarks in Kansas
- National Register of Historic Places listings in Kansas
