= Henry Winfield Haldeman =

American physician (1848–1905)

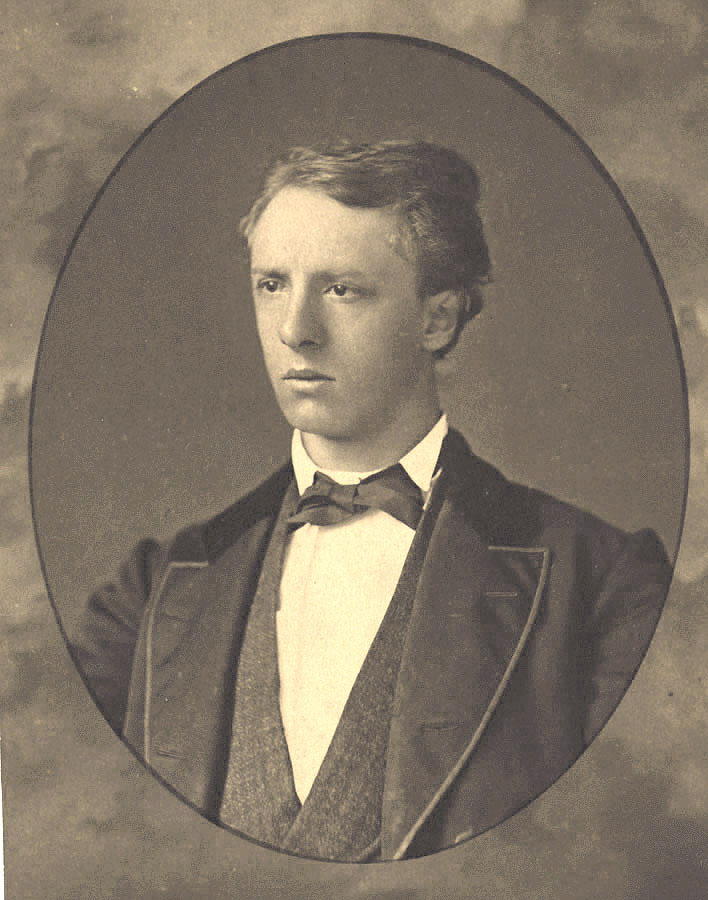
Haldeman as a young man, circa 1875

Henry Winfield Haldeman (June 21, 1848 – March 20, 1905), familiarly known as Harry Haldeman, was an American banker, physician and two-term mayor of Girard, Kansas, in the late 19th century. He was the husband and stepbrother of banker Alice Haldeman, stepbrother of social reformer Jane Addams, father of radical publisher Marcet Haldeman-Julius. He suffered throughout his life from poor health aggravated by alcoholism.

== Early life and education ==
Harries vulnerable point is his—sympathies.... but he is one of those strange natures—who would rather labour to conseal a feeling—than to show it by demonstrations as most people do.
—William Halderman, 1861

Haldeman was born Henry Winfield Halderman, in Mount Carroll, Illinois, on June 21, 1848. His parents were William Halderman (1822-1866), a local businessman and miller, and Anna Hostetter Halderman (1828-1919).

Haldeman attended the Mount Carroll Seminary (later known as Shimer College) in the 1860s, first around 1860-1861 and again, studying music, around 1865-1866. In 1866, after the death of Haldeman's father William, he left with two of his Seminary teachers for the Leipzig Conservatory in Germany, where he studied music for two years. While in Leipzig, he also took preliminary coursework in medicine.

In 1868, his mother Anna married wealthy local businessman John H. Addams. Shortly thereafter, Henry Haldeman fell in love with his new stepsister, Sarah Alice, and they were married on October 25, 1875. The marriage was the subject of disapproval in the family, as the two were not seen as a good match by either of the parents.

Haldeman studied medicine at the University of Michigan from 1873 to 1874, supporting his medical studies by working as a musician and music teacher. He subsequently took up the practice of medicine, which did not then require a degree, in Fontanelle. He finally completed his MD in 1878, at Northwestern University.

In 1881, Haldeman, his wife Alice, and stepsister Jane, all went to Philadelphia to study medicine. Alice, however, was only seeking to learn enough to be able to help him in his practice. Haldeman studied gynecology under the noted gynecologist William Goodell. He completed a second MD in 1882, with a senior essay on the "Evacuation of Exposed Ovarian Cysts".

Haldeman's relationship to his stepsister Jane Addams was troubled, in part due to his troubled marriage with her sister Alice. He was openly derisive of Jane Addams' work for social reform. In 1882, however, Haldeman administered corrective back surgery to Jane Addams at the Haldeman home in Mitchellville, Iowa. The surgery was successful, and helped to heal frayed relations between the Addams sisters. Haldeman may have provided some previous assistance to Jane on musical matters.

== Political and business career ==
After completing his first MD in 1878, Haldeman again set out in medical practice in Iowa. With financial assistance from his mother, he bought out another physician's practice in Mitchellville. However, the arrangement ended badly when the physician failed to honor the non-competition agreement. The work of a country doctor was physically exhausting, and Haldeman soon abandoned his medical work due to his own failing health, probably aggravated by alcoholism, taking up banking and politics instead.

In September 1884, the Haldemans moved to Girard, Kansas. Haldeman purchased a half-interest in the Bank of Girard, which had been established in 1882. In 1886, he purchased the remaining half-interest, becoming president of the bank; he remained in this position for the rest of his life. Much of the running of the bank, however, devolved upon his wife Alice; upon his death, she assumed the presidency of the bank and took it public as the State Bank of Girard.

The Haldemans' only child, Anna Marcet Haldeman, was born in 1887. In subsequent years, the relationship between Henry and Alice Haldeman deteriorated.

Haldeman soon became an established pillar of the community in Girard. He served two terms as mayor, from 1895 to 1899. Much of his mayoral tenure involved combating the local liquor interests. His time as mayor also coincided with the arrival of socialism in Girard in 1896, in the form of Julius Wayland and the Appeal to Reason.

Although he had been unable to complete his conservatory studies, Haldeman retained a strong interest in music. As a scion of the Hostetter family, which was closely involved with the school over many generations, he also retained a strong connection to his alma mater, Shimer College, which by the mid-1890s was known as the Frances Shimer Academy of the University of Chicago. It was there that he met pianist and composer Luella Totten, who was working there as a music teacher. They had an intense affair starting in the mid-1890s that ultimately cost Miss Totten her job at the school. The affair may have lasted until Haldeman's death in 1905. Luella Totten had 55 of his love poems bound as a book, Poems by Henry Winfield Haldeman.

== Death and legacy ==
Haldeman died on March 20, 1905, of a massive heart attack, although some have described the cause of death as "acute alcoholism".

Alice Haldeman said that "with the last words he ever spoke he asked me not to leave the bank," thus crediting him in part with her own illustrious career.

== Works cited ==
- Barrett-Fox, Jason (2008). Feminism, Socialism, and Pragmatism in the Life of Marcet Haldeman-Julius. ISBN 978-0549691341.
- Bryan, Mary Lynn; Barbara Bair (2002). The Selected Papers of Jane Addams, vol. 1: Preparing to Lead. University of Illinois Press. ISBN 0252027299.
- Bryan, Mary Lynn; Barbara Bair (2009). The Selected Papers of Jane Addams, vol. 2: Venturing into Usefulness. University of Illinois Press. ISBN 978-0252090370.
- Diliberto, Gioia (1999). A Useful Woman: The Early Life of Jane Addams. Simon and Schuster. ISBN 0684853655.
