= Hurford =

Hurford is a surname. Notable people with the surname include:

- Chris Hurford (born 1931), Australian politician
- David P. Hurford, American psychologist
- James Hurford, British linguist
- John Hurford (born 1948), English artist
- Peter Hurford (1930–2019), English classical organist and composer
- Richard Hurford (born 1944), Australian Anglican bishop
