= Henry Haldeman =

Henry Haldeman may refer to:

- H. R. Haldeman (Harry Robbins Haldeman, 1926–1993), American political aide and businessman
- Henry Winfield Haldeman (1848–1905), banker, physician and mayor of Girard, Kansas
