= Pittsburg Public Library =

- U.S. National Register of Historic Places
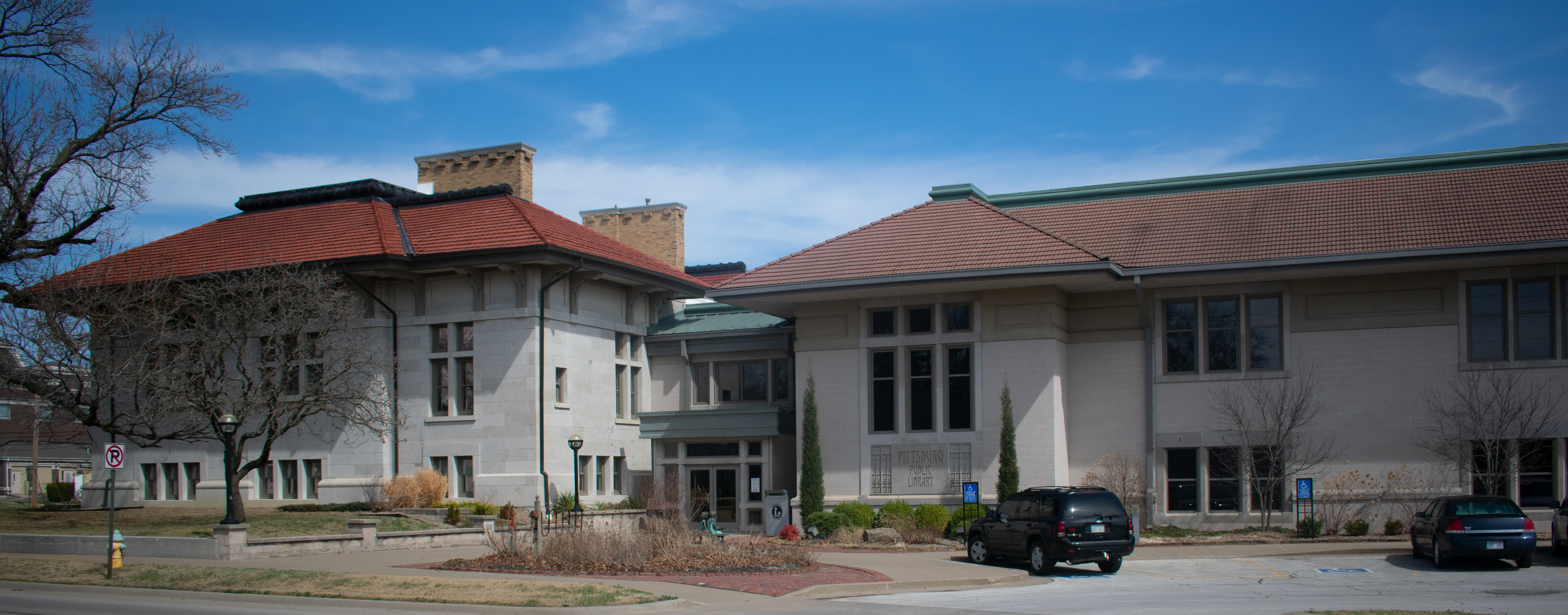
- Exterior of the library (2022)

- Location within Kansas Location within the United States
- Location: 4th and Walnut Sts., Pittsburg, Kansas
- Coordinates: 37°24′40″N 94°42′26″W
- Built: 1910
- Architect: Norman S. Patton, Grant C. Miller
- Architectural style: Prairie Style
- NRHP reference No.: 77000577
- Added to NRHP: November 09, 1977

The Pittsburg Public Library is a public library in Pittsburg, Kansas, United States. A part of the Southeast Kansas Library System, it circulates a collection of over 70,000 items. Its Prairie Style building was built in 1910 through a donation from Andrew Carnegie. Today, the building is listed on the National Register of Historic Places.

== Gallery ==
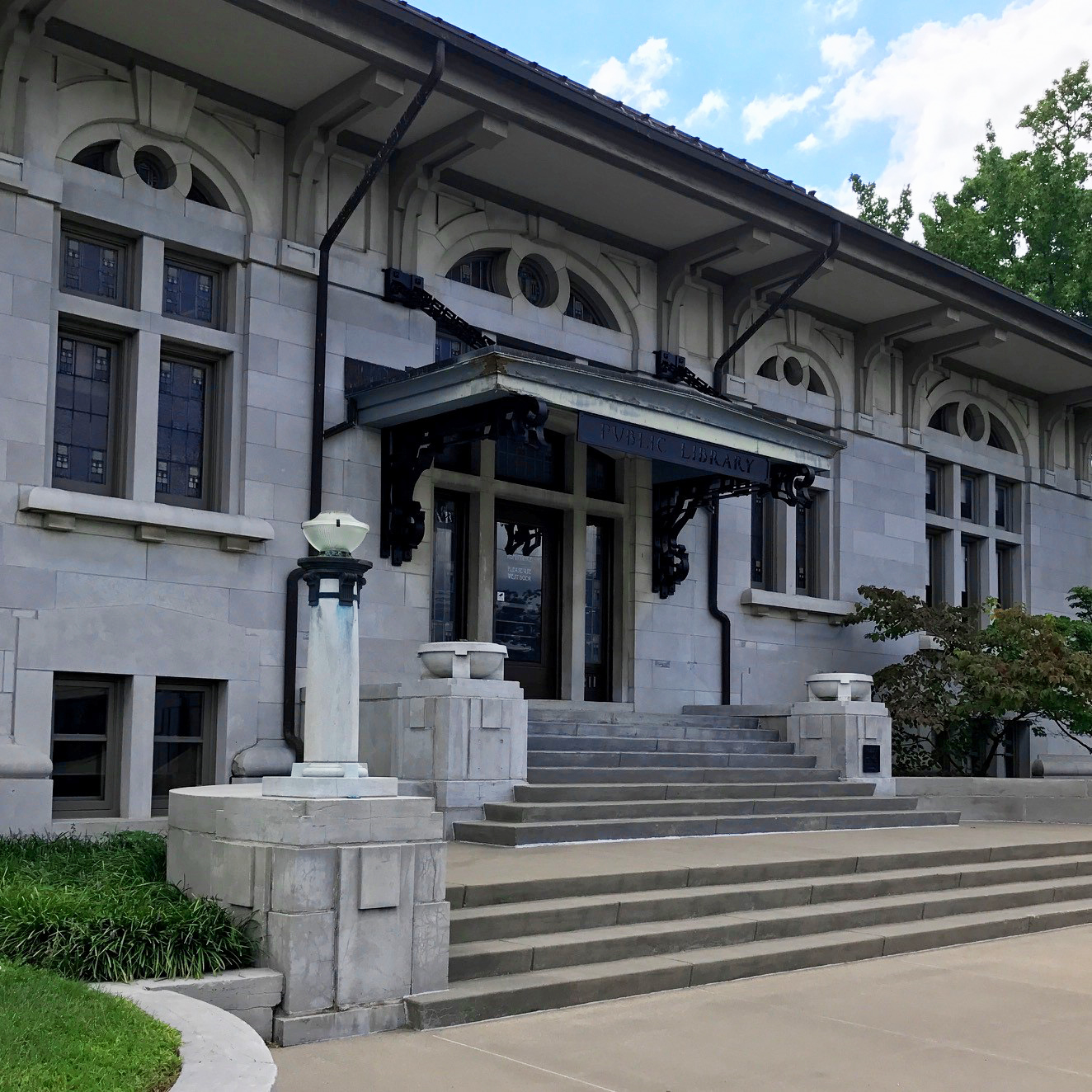
Pittsburg Public Library (2017)

== See also ==
- Center for the Assessment and Remediation of Reading Difficulties
- National Register of Historic Places listings in Crawford County, Kansas
