= Alice Haldeman =

American businesswoman (1853–1915)

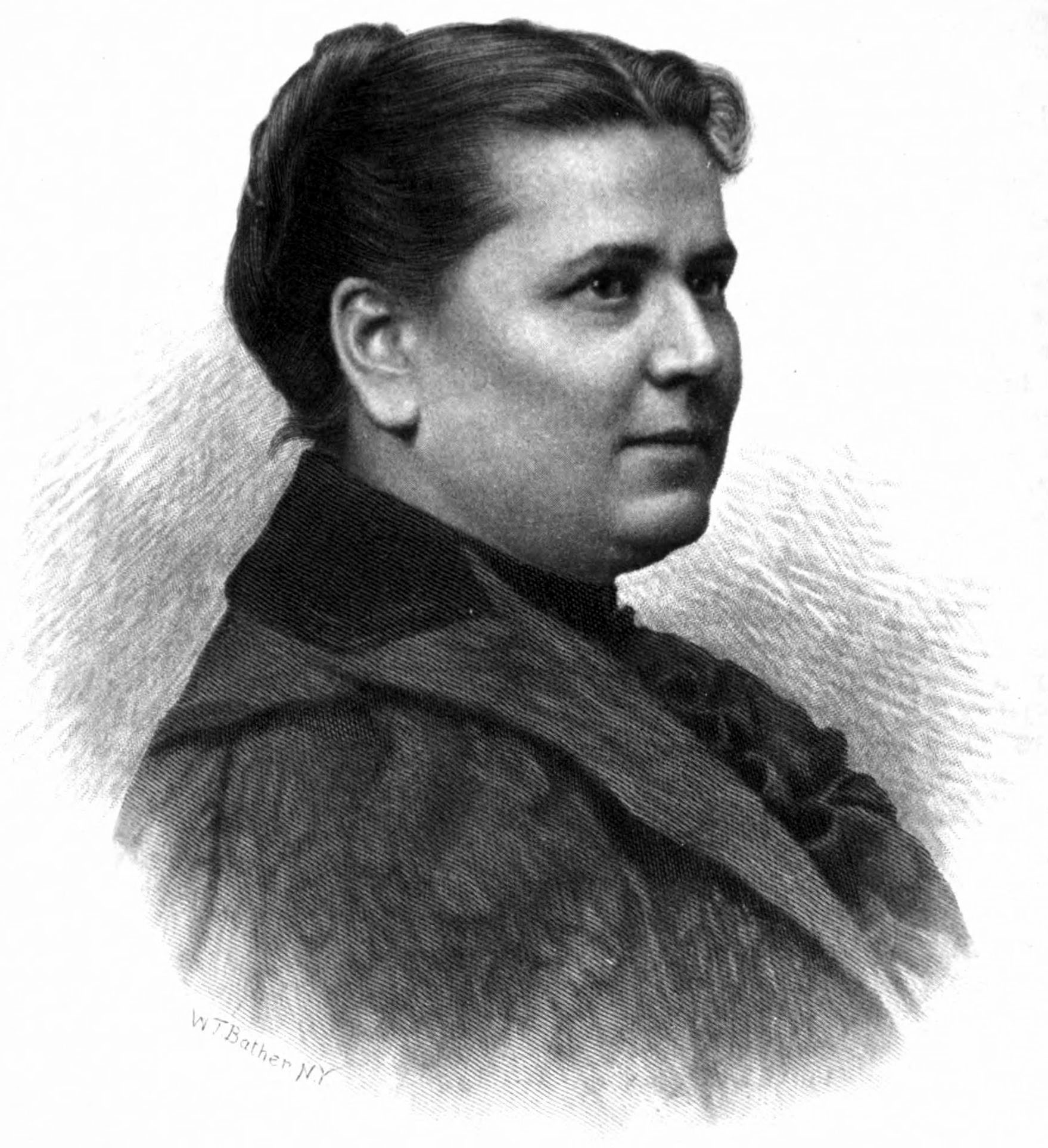
- Born: Sarah Alice Addams; June 5, 1853; Cedarville, Illinois
- Died: March 19, 1915 (aged 61); Chicago, Illinois
- Occupations: Craftswoman, Banker and Philanthropist
- Spouse: Henry Winfield Haldeman
- Children: Anna Marcet Haldeman
- Parent(s): John H. Addams; Sarah Weber
- Relatives: Jane Addams (sister); James Weber Linn (nephew)

Signature
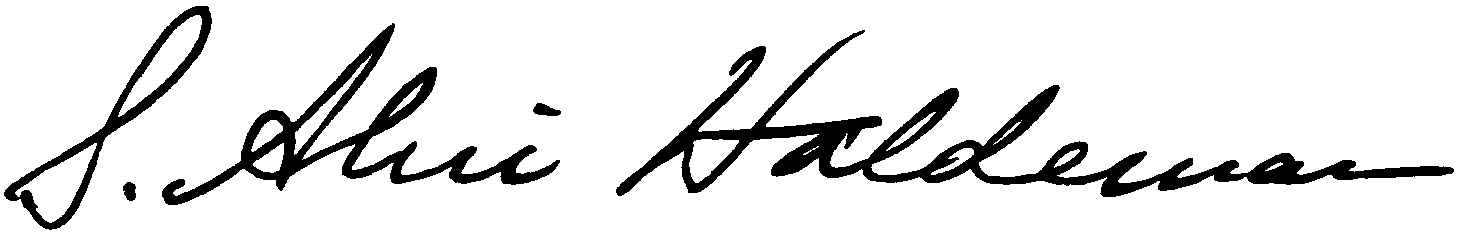

Sarah Alice Haldeman (June 5, 1853 – March 19, 1915) was an American craftswoman, banker and philanthropist. She was the sister of social activist Jane Addams and mother of Marcet Haldeman-Julius.

== Biography ==
=== Ancestors ===
She was the daughter of John Huy and Sarah (Weber) Addams. Her father was a successful miller and banker in northern Illinois, also serving as state senator from 1856 to 1872. He greatly influenced the policy of the state during the Civil War, to which, as his grandfather, Isaac Addams, had done in the Revolutionary War, he equipped and sent a company. Her first American ancestor was Richard Addams, who emigrated to the colonies from Oxfordshire, England, in 1684 and settled on land which he purchased from William Penn. From him. the line of descent is traced through William and Anna (Lane) Addams; Isaac and Barbara (Ruth) Addams; Samuel and Catherine (Huey) Addams, and John and Sarah (Weber) Addams.

=== Early life ===
She received her early education in Cedarville, where an academy under the direction of Jennie Forbes had been established by several of the more progressive families. From this school, Haldeman went to Rockford Seminary at Rockford, Illinois, then designated as the Mount Holyoke of the West, and completed the course there at the age of nineteen.

=== Marriage ===
After a year in Europe and the study of art in several American studios, she married Henry Winfield Haldeman, her stepbrother, in 1875. For several years, Henry practiced medicine in Iowa and later when he spent a year in graduate medical work in Philadelphia, Alice took a course at the Woman's Medical College of that city. She was thus fitted to co-operate with her husband in his medical practice, becoming his anesthetist, helping him in operations and acquiring a wide range of knowledge. In 1884, when Henry's health necessitated his retirement from active practice, he and his wife settled in Girard, Kansas, where he engaged in banking. Here one daughter was born to them, Anna Marcet Haldeman, who survived her parents.

=== Girard, Kansas ===
Alice Haldeman soon became a vital force in the educational and philanthropic movements of Girard and Kansas. Like her sister, Jane Addams, of Hull House, Chicago, she was interested in every enterprise which looked toward social or civic betterment. Her interest was particularly with young people, and her first organized work for the community was a large and successful boys' club. She was elected president of the Girard Board of Education in 1895 and during her ten years in office had a wide acquaintance among the children of the schools and an intimate knowledge of their needs.

For years the people of Girard made constant use of Haldeman's fine library. But this proving inadequate, she brought together the club women of Girard and organized a library association, serving as president of its board from 1899 to 1908, during which time the Girard Public Library, housed in a substantial Carnegie building, became a permanent factor in the intellectual life of the community.

Haldeman identified herself with the Presbyterian Church, leaving the impress of her strong personality upon its varied activities and for 28 years was treasurer of its board of trustees. Her love for the foreign mission cause found expression in numerous material and spiritual ways, and many missionaries in distant lands were cheered by her unflagging, personal interest.

Haldeman found in club life an avenue of constant usefulness, both for study and friendships. She early appreciated the value of women's clubs and magnified it. She was a member of the Ladies' Reading Club of Girard for more than twenty years, of the City Federation and State Federation of Women's Clubs. In 1901 she organized the Twentieth Century Club of Girard and a similar club in a neighboring town. She was president of the third district, Kansas Federation of Women's Clubs, 1900–01; was a member of the civic committee of the General Federation of Women's Clubs, 1904–06; was a member of the Topeka Chapter of the D. A. R., and of the State Board of Charities. As a presiding officer, Haldeman combined the requisite parliamentary knowledge with an unusual graciousness of manner.

She loved to exercise hospitality and shared with her friends what she herself enjoyed. Beautiful pictures, fine laces, and basketry were among her enthusiasms and in her occasional exhibitions of the two latter she not only communicated her own careful information and appreciation concerning them, but evoked a real interest in their possibilities. Her hands were seldom idle, and the homes of many of her friends had examples of her painting, basketry, and needlework.

=== Banker ===
In 1905, at the death of her husband, whose business responsibilities she had long shared, Alice Haldeman became actively interested in local banking. In May of that year, she reorganized the private Bank of Girard into the State Bank of Girard. She was elected its president, an office which no other woman in Kansas had previously held, and served in that capacity until her death. In 1914, the Kansas State Bankers' Association broke a precedent and elected her a vice-president. She directed the bank for more than ten years and also scientifically managed a large stock farm in Illinois, which she owned and operated for thirty years.
