= Julius A. Wayland House =

Historic house in Kansas, United States

- U.S. National Register of Historic Places
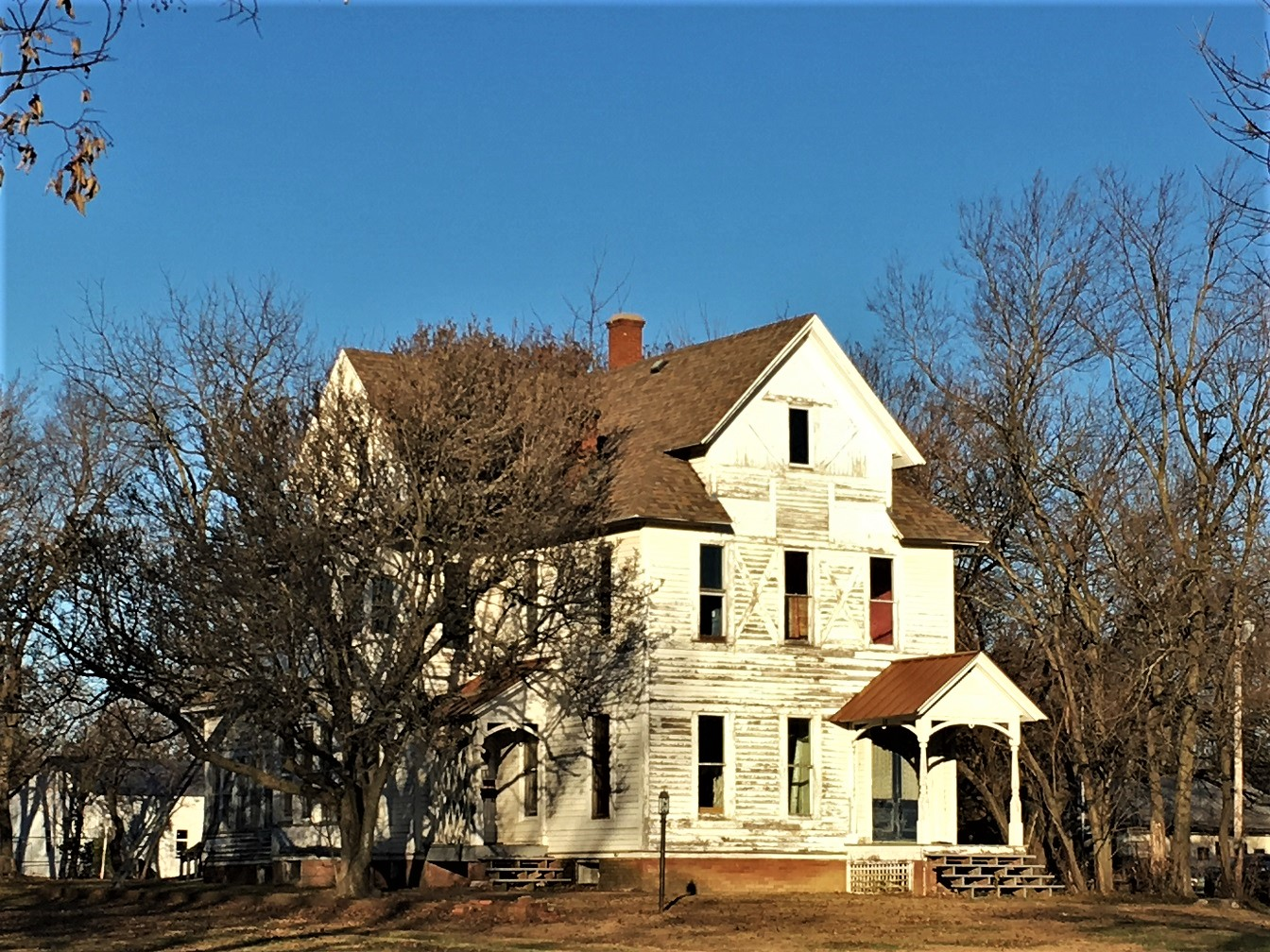
- The house in 2017

- Location within Kansas
- Location: 721 North Summit, Girard, Kansas
- Coordinates: 37°31′14″N 94°50′36″W
- Area: 2 acres (0.81 ha)
- Built: 1886
- Built by: Allen Bros.
- Architectural style: Stick/eastlake
- NRHP reference No.: 76000819
- Added to NRHP: November 21, 1976

The Julius A. Wayland House is a historic house in Girard, Kansas. It was built in 1886, and it belonged to socialist publisher Julius Wayland, who committed suicide in the house in 1912. It is listed on the National Register of Historic Places.

== History ==
The house was built by Allen Bros. for John F. Moore in 1886, and it belonged to Sarah Flint from 1893 to 1896.

It was acquired by Etta Bevan Wayland in 1896. Her husband, Julius Wayland, was the publisher of Appeal to Reason, a socialist newspaper. He committed suicide in the house on November 11, 1912.

== Architectural significance ==
The house was designed in the Stick/Eastlake architectural style. It has been listed on the National Register of Historic Places since November 21, 1976.
