= David P. Hurford =

American psychologist

David P. Hurford is a psychologist and researcher who specializes in dyslexia/reading difficulties and attention deficit hyperactivity disorder (ADHD). He is a professor and chair of the Department of Psychology and Counseling at Pittsburg State University and directs the Center for Research, Evaluation and Awareness of Dyslexia (Center for READing) at the same institution. In addition, he is the president of Reading Screening, LLC and the manager of the Center for the Assessment and Remediation of Reading Difficulties, Inc. (CARRD, Inc.) a nonprofit created to help individuals become competent readers and was a Spencer Fellow of the National Academy of Education.

== Selected publications ==
- Fehrenbach, L. A., Hurford, D. P., Fehrenbach, C. R., Brannock, R. G. (1998). Developing the emergent literacy of preschool children through a library outreach program. Journal of Youth Services in Libraries, 12, 40–45.
- Hurford, D. P. (1990). Training phonemic segmentation ability with a phonemic discrimination intervention in second- and third-grade children with reading disabilities. Journal of Learning Disabilities, 23, 564–569.
- Hurford, D. P. (1991). The possible use of IBM-compatible computers and digital-to-analog conversion to assess children for reading disabilities and to increase their phonemic awareness. Behavior Research Methods, Instruments, & Computers, 23, 319–323.
- Hurford, D. P. (2010). Secret Codes. A reading curriculum for young children. Pittsburg, KS: DEPCO, LLC.
- Hurford, D. P., Darrow, L. J., Edwards, T. L., Howerton, C. J., Mote, C. R., Schauf, J. D., & Coffey, P. (1993). An examination of the phonemic processing abilities in children during their first-grade year. Journal of Learning Disabilities, 26, 167–177.
- Hurford, D. P., Gilliland, C., & Ginavan, S. (1992). Examination of the intrasyllable phonemic discrimination deficit in children with reading disabilities, Contemporary Educational Psychology, 17, 83–88.
- Hurford, D. P. & Hurford, S. K. (2010). Literacy component of the Block Academy: Preschool Curriculum. Pittsburg, KS: DEPCO, LLC.
- Hurford, D. P., Johnston, M., Nepote, P., Hampton, S., Moore, S., Neal, J., Mueller, A., McGeorge, K., Huff, L., Awad, A., Tatro, C., Juliano, C., & Huffman, D. (1994). Early identification and remediation of phonological processing deficits in first-grade children at risk for reading disabilities. Journal of Learning Disabilities, 27, 647–659.
- Hurford, D. P., Potter, T. S., & Hart, G. S. (2002). Examination of three techniques for identifying first-grade children at risk for difficulty in word identification with an emphasis on reducing the false negative error rate. Reading Psychology, 23(3), 159–180.
- Hurford, D. P., & Sanders, R. E. (1990). Assessment and remediation of a phonemic discrimination deficit in reading disabled second- and fourth-graders. Journal of Experimental Child Psychology, 50, 396–415.
- Hurford, D. P., & Sanders, R. E. (1995). Phonological recoding ability in young children with reading disabilities. Contemporary Educational Psychology, 20, 121–126.
- Hurford, D. P., Schauf, J. D., Blaich, T., Bunce, L. & Moore, K. (1994). Early identification of children at risk for reading disabilities. Journal of Learning Disabilities, 27, 371–382.
- Hurford, D. P., & Shedelbower, A. (1993). The relationship between discrimination and memory ability in children with reading disabilities. Contemporary Educational Psychology, 18, 101–113.
- Lynch, S., Hurford, D. P., & Cole, A. (2002). Parental enabling attitudes and locus of control of at-risk and honors students. Adolescence, 37(147), 527–550.
- Marangoni, A. H. & Hurford, D. P. (1990). The effect of varying alveolar carbon dioxide levels on free recall. Brain and Cognition, 13, 77–85.
- Moore, C., & Hurford, D. P. (1998). Reactions of Students to a Brief Message Viewed on Commercial Television Concerning Homework. National Forum of Applied Educational Research, 11E(3) 113–119.
