= State Bank of Girard =

- U.S. National Register of Historic Places
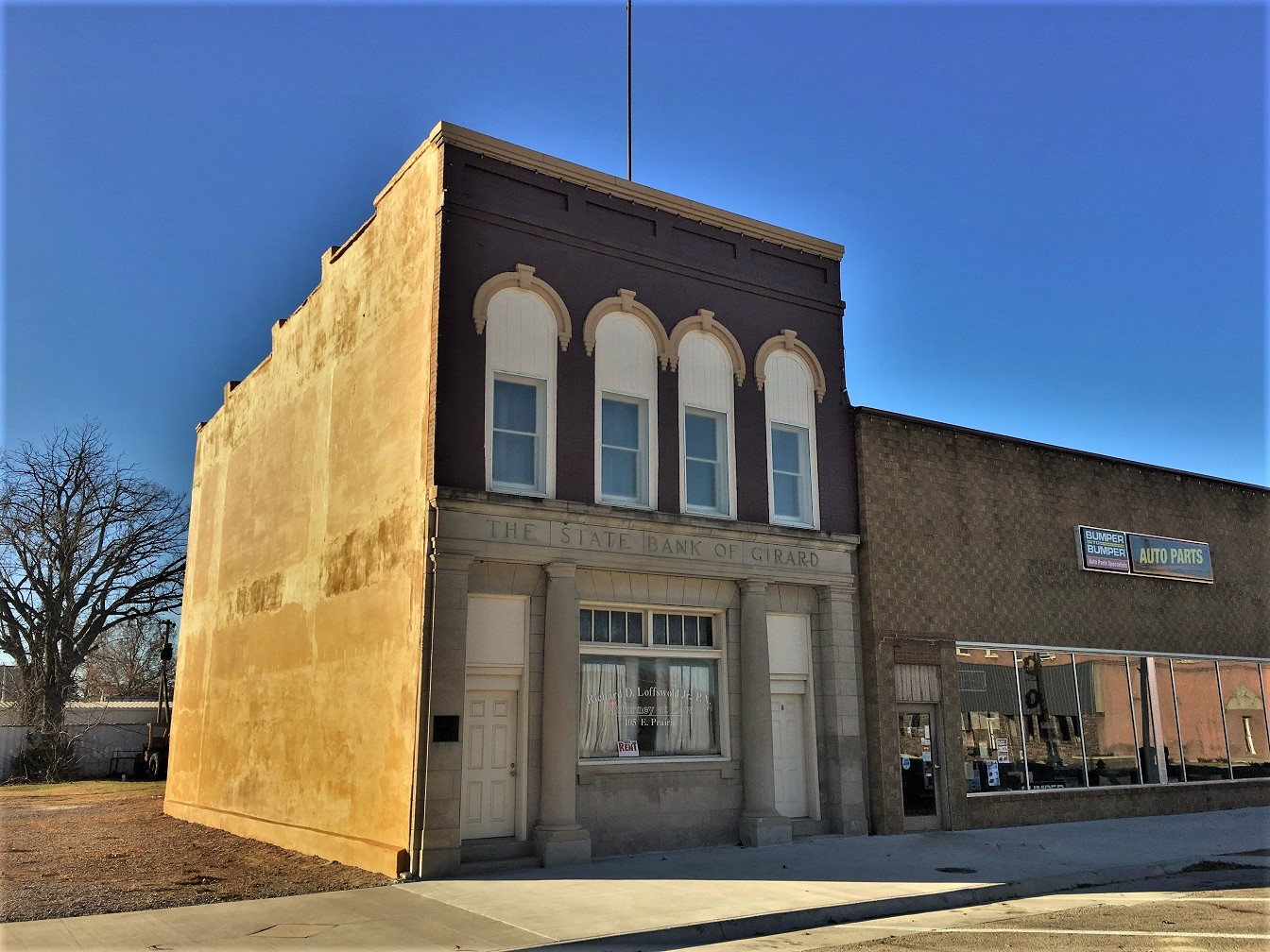
- The State Bank of Girard in 2017

- Location within Kansas Location within the United States
- Location: 105 E. Prairie, Girard, Kansas
- Coordinates: 37°30′34″N 94°50′36″W
- Area: Less than one acre
- Built: 1873
- Architectural style: Italianate, Classical Revival
- NRHP reference No.: 09000349
- Added to NRHP: August 7, 2009

The State Bank of Girard, at 105 E. Prairie in Girard, Kansas, was built in 1873. It was listed on the National Register of Historic Places in 2009.

It is 30 by 50 feet (9.1 m × 15.2 m) in plan and was Girard's first brick building. It was built in Italianate style and was modified c.1915 with Classical Revival-style changes.
