= John Tewell =

American archivist (1943–2025)

- Born: July 15, 1943; Pittsburg, Kansas, United States
- Died: February 11, 2025 (aged 81); Imus, Cavite, Philippines
- Spouse: Dorothy Tewell (m. 2007)

John Tewell (July 15, 1943 – February 11, 2025) was an American pilot, aerial photographer, and archivist recognized for his extensive collection of historical photographs documenting Philippine heritage. His archive contains thousands of images depicting everyday life, architecture, and ethnolinguistic communities in the Philippines from the late-19th to the mid-20th century. Many of these photographs have been used in ethnographic and historical research by cultural institutions in the country.

== Early life and career ==
Tewell was a native of Pittsburg, Kansas, United States. In 1961, he graduated from Girard High School in Girard, Kansas. After a long career as a pilot, he retired in 2007 and subsequently settled in the Philippines. His interest in collecting Philippine heritage photographs began in 2008 when he discovered an album of 1930s portrait photographs in an antique shop in Ermita, Manila. This purchase marked the beginning of his systematic collection of rare and vintage photographs related to the country's history and culture.

== Photography and collections ==
Tewell had been interested in photography since the 1950s, describing his life as "always pointing in the direction of photography," as noted in a 2017 Philippine Star feature by former Senator Nikki Coseteng. His collection expanded to include photographs of historic sites, everyday street scenes in Manila and Cavite, significant events such as the 1928 eruption of Mayon Volcano, and images taken during and after World War II, including the ruins of the Old Legislative Building.

Over the years, Tewell collaborated with authors, historians, collectors, and conservators, sharing images that contributed to the study of Philippine architecture and culture. Before his death, he digitized nearly 13,000 photographs, many of which were uploaded to a publicly accessible Flickr account that has accumulated more than 60 million views as of 2026. His original prints were deposited for safekeeping at the Filipinas Heritage Library at Ayala Museum in Makati.

The breadth of his archive spans various themes, including Spanish colonial-era Philippines, pre- and post-war Manila, traditional architecture, indigenous communities, and daily life during the 19th and early 20th centuries.

== Illness and death ==
Tewell and his wife, Dorothy, resided in Imus, Cavite. In June 2023, he was issued an emergency passport by the United States Embassy in Manila but was reportedly unable to renew it due to lack of internet access. In May of the same year, Tewell made public statements on social media alleging improper treatment at the Perpetual Help Medical Center in Las Piñas, which the hospital later addressed in an official statement.

Several cultural organizations, including Renacimiento Manila, appealed for assistance on his behalf, recognizing his contributions to preserving visual records of Philippine heritage.

Tewell died at his home on February 11, 2025, at the age of 81.
