= Edythe Baker =

American jazz/ragtime pianist (1908–1971)

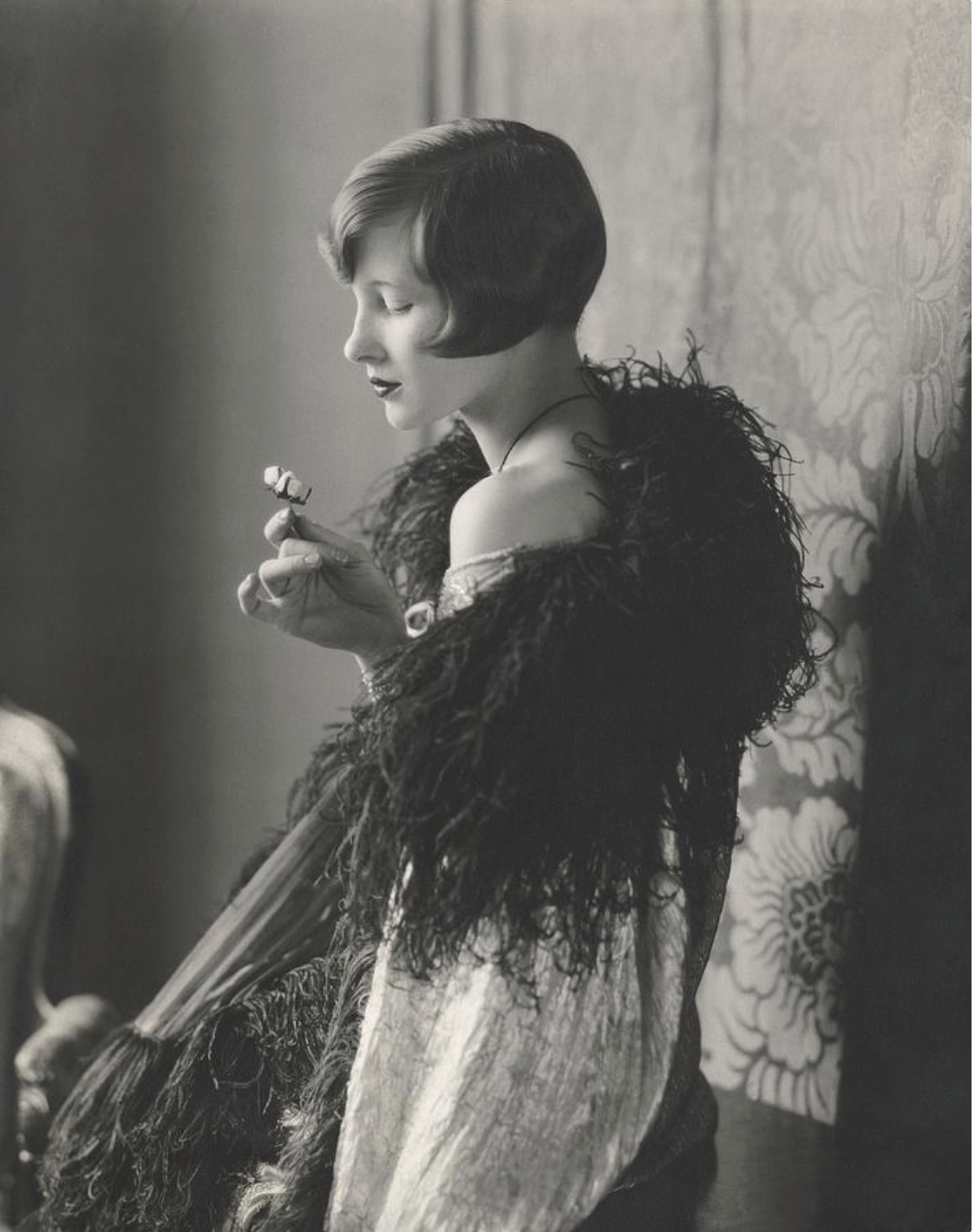
- Edythe Baker, 1925
- Born: Edith Ann Baker; August 25, 1899; Girard, Kansas U.S.
- Died: August 15, 1971 (aged 71); Corona del Mar, California U.S.
- Occupations: Jazz pianist; Broadway performer; Ziegfeld Girl

Edythe Baker (August 25, 1899–August 15, 1971) was an American pianist and dancer.

== Early life ==
Baker was born in Girard, Kansas. Her parents divorced around 1905, and Edith moved to Kansas City, Missouri with her mother. From ages 8 to 14, Baker was educated at St. Mary's Convent in Independence, Missouri, receiving piano and voice lessons.

There are varying accounts of her musical development during her early teenage years. One describes her work at Nowlin Music Co. in Kansas City as a musician and saleswoman. Another account claims she received lessons from the performer Ernie Burnett. She supposedly also regularly visited the Orpheum Theatre in Kansas City, where she listened to different piano styles. Allegedly, she could support her mother and brother by age 15, playing ragtime piano in small cabarets. Her "peculiar style" along with her good looks made her "a favorite among cabaret regulars."

Yet another account has her running away from school and home to Leavenworth, MO, and finding work playing piano in a moving picture house. She did this for two years, returned to Kansas City, and became a popular cafe player. Harry Fox, a vaudeville performer, saw her act in one such place and offered her a job in his company.

== Professional career ==
In September 1919, "Edythe Baker" was billed with Willie Smith in a Vaudeville act in Fall River, MA.

One observer noted that Baker practiced five or six hours daily and "developed a system of playing that was entirely her own. She was one of the first pianists to 'play against time' to achieve that 'heartbreak rhythm.'"

Baker is in March 1920 described as a "pianist featured in Harry Fox's new vaudeville offering" having come "to New York only a few months ago from Kansas City, alone and unheralded, in search of a career as a concert pianist." Yet "An offer to do a “blues” bit... drew such attention to her skill that she soon signed a contract" with Fox "and is now being besieged by musical comedy companies."

Just a month later, Baker is noted as having signed a two-year contract with Aeolian Records to make player piano rolls. "After leaving here [Kansas City, MO] two years ago" Baker "has been headlining on the Keith circuit as a pianist and composer... she will be featured in theaters in New York and vicinity by the Aeolian company." She is described as 19 years old.

Aeolian extolled her as "the foremost ragtime pianist of vaudeville" and claimed that "Miss Baker's conception of the various kind of 'Blues' so much in vogue at present is considered the most unique of its kind. Her playing is both snappy and artistic, while her charming personality is apparent in everything she interprets".

In 1920 she auditioned for Florenz Ziegfeld, Jr. "A piano was placed on the great bare stage of the New Amsterdam Theatre and the girl went to it." When she finished, "Ziegfeld asked her to stand up. He was amazed at her powerful playing and said he wanted to know where on earth all her strength came from." Ziegfeld cast her in the "Ziegfeld Midnight Frolic," an after-the-show cabaret staged at the rooftop restaurant of the New Amsterdam Theater, and became a regular there (as a dancer and musician) as well as with the "Ziegfeld 9 O'Clock Revue," during 1920-1921. One account stated that "Her act is entitled 'Ten Fingers of Syncopation,' and her playing makes it difficult for members of the audience to keep their feet still."

After working for Ziegfeld, she had principal roles in several other Broadway musicals through 1926 while continuing to record jazz music. In 1926, Baker moved to London, where she became a major theatrical star. She starred in the play One Damn Thing After Another by Charles B. Cochran and Richard Rodgers. Rodgers highly regarded Baker and mentioned her kindly in his autobiography, noting her novel performance style.

She continued to record, with her last session in 1933. Baker's music can be heard online via the Smithsonian Folkways Recordings site.

== Personal life ==
In 1928, Baker married a scion from a wealthy banking family Gerard d'Erlanger and became a fixture in London high society, allegedly teaching the Prince of Wales how to dance the popular dance known as the Black Bottom. She and her husband divorced in 1934.

Despite her fame, Baker retained a common touch, as recounted by John Durnford-Slater in Commando: Memoirs of a Fighting Commando in World War Two. "In 1927, when I went up to London for my army examination... I saw and heard Edythe Baker playing 'My Heart Stood Still' and 'The Birth of the Blues'. I thought this the greatest thing I had experienced, and was still of the same opinion in 1944. One evening... our hostess said that she would get the use of the bathroom in the flat above, this being Edythe Baker's flat. Baker... personally cleaned out the bath, ran it and put in the bath salts. As I lay in the bath I could hear 'My Heart Stood Still' being played on the piano. The greatest bath of all time? Of course it was."

Baker returned to the United States in August 1945. She married Girard S. Brewer in Orange, California, on December 2, 1961. The couple resided there through the time of Baker's death in 1971.
