= Anna Marcet Haldeman =

American dramatist

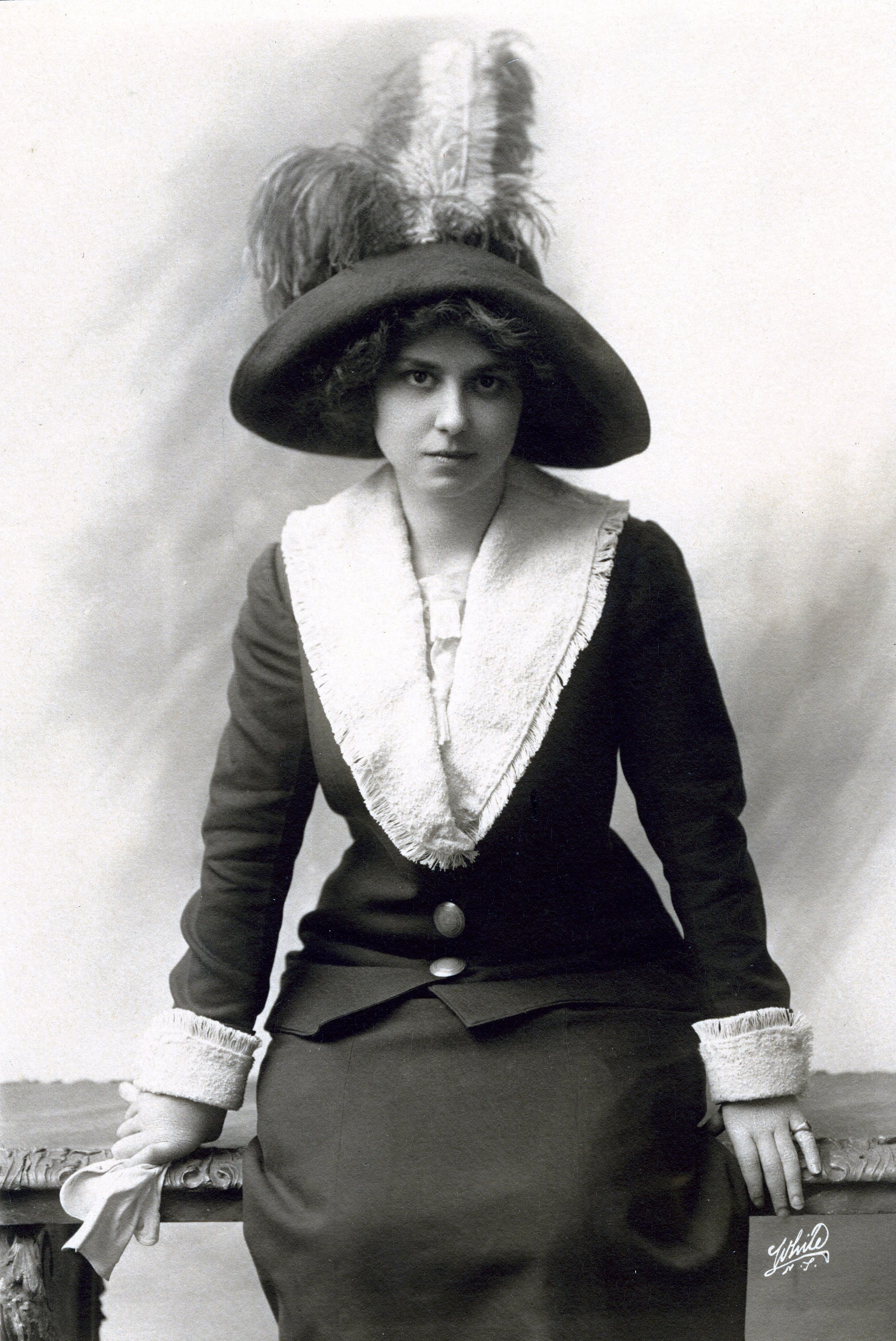
- Anna M. Haldeman ca. 1912
- Born: Anna Marcet Haldeman; June 18, 1887; Girard, Kansas
- Died: February 13, 1941 (aged 53); Girard, Kansas
- Other name: Anna Haldeman-Julius
- Occupations: Actress, playwright, author
- Spouse: E. Haldeman-Julius

Marcet Haldeman-Julius (née Anna Marcet Haldeman; June 18, 1887 – February 13, 1941) was an American feminist, actress, playwright, civil rights advocate, editor, author, and bank president.

== Life and career ==
She was born in Girard, Kansas, the daughter of physician Henry Winfield Haldeman and his wife Alice. Alice was the sister of social activist Jane Addams, with whom Marcet maintained a close relation until the end of the Addams's life.

Marcet studied at the Rockford Seminary for Young Ladies (alma mater also of her aunt Jane) and then the Dearborn Seminary in Chicago, until the death of her father in 1905, followed by Bryn Mawr College in Pennsylvania. While at Bryn Mawr she became one of the closest friends and confidantes of the poet Marianne Moore. After three years she left the college to continue her stage acting, graduating from the American Academy of Dramatic Arts in 1910. Between 1910 and 1915 she performed with the Orpheum Players and other stock companies in Newark, New York, Montreal, St. Louis and other cities, under the name Jean Marcet.

Marcet's father and mother ran the Bank of Girard. When her mother Alice died in 1915, Marcet once again returned to her hometown, where she took over management of the bank. That same year she founded The Jolly Club in nearby Radley, for the benefit of the many young immigrants (from numerous countries, but especially Italy) who had come to work in the area's mines. The Jolly Club provided English lessons, practical training and safe diversion. The following year she began to found other clubs as well, including one for younger boys and an Italian language club. These became quite popular and in 1921 she turned one of them into a school, where she taught. During her youth Marcet had spent many summers with her aunt, Jane Addams, at Hull House; she credited Addams with much of her inspiration and over the years the two of them discussed Marcet's clubs both in person and through correspondence.

In 1916 she married activist and publisher Emanuel Julius. At her aunt Jane's suggestion, both partners adopted the surname Haldeman-Julius. They wrote both separately and together, their most well-known collaboration being the 1921 novel Dust. "She travelled to the Soviet Union in 1931-1932 to report on the status of the Russian Revolution for The American Freeman. […] In the 1930s she did numerous articles and short stories with John W. Gunn, a writer for the Haldeman-Julius press." In 1932 she was a delegate to the National Convention of the Socialist Party of America and that same year Emanuel ran for Senate on the Socialist Party ticket.

Marcet and Emanuel had two children, Alice (1917–1991) and Henry (1919–1990), and adopted a third, Josephine (b. 1910). "In 1933 the couple legally was separated but continued to live in the same house", though she "spent a lot of her time at the [Addams] family farm in Cedarville."

Marcet died of cancer in Girard in 1941. Her papers are held at Kansas State University Libraries, Bryn Mawr, Pittsburg State University, the University of Illinois at Chicago and Indiana University.

== Selected works ==
- The People's Bank and the Bank's People, 1916.
- Sketches (with Emanuel Haldeman-Julius), 1917.
- "Dreams and Compound Interest" (with Emanuel Haldeman-Julius), 1919.
- "Caught" (with Emanuel Haldeman-Julius), 1919.
- "The Unworthy Coopers" (with Emanuel Haldeman-Julius), 1921.
- Dust (with Emanuel Haldeman-Julius), 1921.
- What Great Men Have Said About Women, 1922.
- Embers: A Play in One Act (with Emanuel Haldeman-Julius), ca. 1923.
- "Impressions of the Scopes Trial," 1925.
- "An Interview with Harry Houdini," 1925.
- Clarence Darrow's Defense of a Negro, 1926.
- Clarence Darrow's Two Great Trials: Reports of the Scopes Anti-Evolution Case and the Dr. Sweet Negro Trial, 1927.
- The Story of a Lynching: An Exploration of Southern Psychology, 1927.
- Why I Believe in Companionate Marriage, ca. 1927.
- "What the Negro Students Endure in Kansas", 1928.
- Violence (with Emanuel Haldeman-Julius), 1929.
- Great Court Trials of History, ca. 1930s.
- Spurts from an Interrupted Pen, ca. 1931.
- Talks with Joseph McCabe, and Other Confidential Sketches, ca. 1931.
- Jane Addams As I Knew Her, 1936.
- Famous and Interesting Guests at a Kansas Farm: Impressions of Upton Sinclair, Lawrence Tibbett, Mrs. Martin Johnson, Clarence Darrow, Will Durant, E.W. Howe, Alfred Kreymborg and Anna Louise Strong, 1936.
- Three Generations of Changing Morals, ca. 1936.
- A Popular History of the United States, ca. 1937.
- The King and Mrs. Simpson, ca. 1937.
- Assassinations of American Presidents, With Two Attempted Assassinations, 1938.
- Five Short Stories, (repub. 1982).
- Short Works (with Emanuel Haldeman-Julius), (repub. 1992).

== Bibliography ==
- Addams, Jane. The Selected Papers of Jane Addams (edd. Mary Lynn Bryan and Barbara Bair). Urbana: Univ. Illinois Press, 2002 (vol. 1) and 2009 (vol. 2).
- Addams, Jane. Peace and Bread in Time of War (ed. Katherine Joslin). Urbana: Univ. Illinois Press, 2002 [1922], pp. xvi-xvii, xxv-xxvi.
- Barrett-Fox, Jason. Feminism, Socialism, and Pragmatism in the Life of Marcet Haldeman-Julius, 1887-1941 (thesis, University of Kansas, 2008; online at KU here).
- Barrett-Fox, Jason. “A Rhetorical Recovery: Self-Avowal and Self-Displacement in the Life, Fiction, and Nonfiction of Marcet Haldeman-Julius, 1921-1936.” Rhetoric Review, vol. 21.1 (2010), pp. 14–30 (abstract).
- Barrett-Fox, Jason. Feminisms, Publics, and Rhetorical Indirections: Figuring Marcet Haldeman-Julius, Anita Loos, and Mae West, 1905-1930 (diss., Univ. Kansas, 2013).
- Breaux, Richard M. "Using the Press to Fight Jim Crow at Two White Midwestern Universities, 1900-1940" in The History of Discrimination in U.S. Education (ed. E.H. Tamura). New York: Palgrave Macmillan, 2008, pp. 141–164.
- Brown, Melanie Ann. Five-Cent Culture at the "University in Print": Radical Ideology and the Marketplace in E. Haldeman-Julius's Little Blue Books, 1919-1929 (diss., Univ. Minnesota, 2006; see here).
- Burnett, Betty. "Haldeman-Julius, Emanuel." American National Biography (edd. John A. Garraty and Mark C. Carnes). 24 vols. New York: OUP, 1999. Vol. 9.
- Davis, Rebecca L. "'Not Marriage at All, but Simple Harlotry: The Companionate Marriage Controversy." Journal of American History, vol. 94, no. 4 (March, 2008), pp. 1137–1163.
- DeGruson, Eugene. "Afterword." Washburn Univ. Center for Kansas Studies, 1992.
- Gunn, John W. "Marcet." Girard: Haldeman-Julius, 1941.
- Homans, James E., ed. (1918). "Haldeman, Sarah Alice (Addams)" . The Cyclopædia of American Biography. New York: The Press Association Compilers, Inc.
- Leavell, Linda. Holding On Upside Down: The Life and Work of Marianne Moore. New York: Farrar, Straus and Giroux, 2013.
- Moore, Marianne. Selected Letters (ed. Bonnie Costello). New York: Penguin, 1997.
- Wright, Holly. The Anna Marcet Haldeman-Julius Story (thesis, Wichita State University, 2001).
