= Luella Totten =

American pianist, composer and music educator

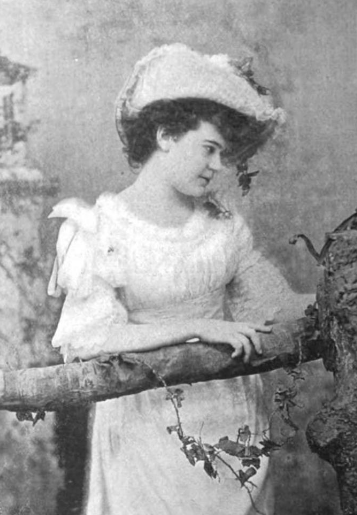
- Born: c. 1870; Pittsburgh, Pennsylvania
- Died: November 5, 1950; Los Angeles, California
- Other names: Louis von Heinrich, Louise von Heinrich, Luella Totten Patteson
- Occupations: Pianist, composer, music educator

Luella Totten (c. 1870 – November 5, 1950) was an American pianist, composer, and music educator. She was also known as Louis von Heinrich.

== Early life ==
Luella G. Totten was born in Pittsburgh, Pennsylvania, the daughter of William Henry Denny Totten and Ann Elizabeth Covert Totten. Her father was in the iron business. "Pittsburgh, that wonderful city of steel, iron, coal, smoke, art and progress, with its unnumbered millions and millionaires, has produced nothing more remarkable than this woman composer," declared a music magazine in 1908. She studied piano in Chicago, and in Vienna with Theodor Leschetizky. She also worked with Edvard Grieg.

Later in life, she studied composition at Yale University School of Music. In 1900 she won the Steinert Scholarship, a competitive award for piano study at Yale. In 1902 she became the third woman to earn a Bachelor of Music degree at Yale. She pursued further studies in composition at the Peabody Conservatory in Baltimore, and with Max Reger in Leipzig, before World War I.

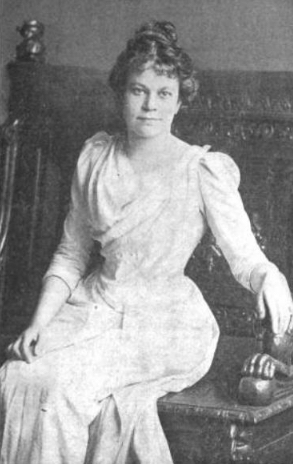
Luella Totten, or Louis von Heinrich, from a 1908 publication

== Career ==
Totten taught music at Shimer College from 1894 to 1898. She had an affair with politician and physician Henry Winfield Haldeman. She was fired from her position at Shimer College when the affair became known. Haldeman died in 1905. She later published his love poems to her as a book.

In 1908 she was billed as "Louis von Heinrich", and performed in concerts of her own compositions, in Paris, and in London with the London Symphony Orchestra and vocalist Tilly Koenen. "Her compositions include every conceivable form," explained one newspaper in 1908, "sonatas for piano, violin, and cello; songs; string quartets, trios, quintets, church music and orchestral works such as overtures, suits and symphonies."

As "Miss Louis von Heinrich" she returned to teaching post-secondary music classes. She taught piano and composition at the Michigan Conservatory of Music in the 1908–1909 academic year. In 1910 she was named to the faculty of the Northwestern Conservatory. In 1911 she taught at Beaver College in Pennsylvania. By 1912 she was back in Chicago, running a piano studio and giving recitals.

== Personal life ==
Luella Totten married Thomas E. Patteson, an English army officer, after 1912; in 1918 they were living in Edmonton, Alberta. She was a recent widow when she died in late 1950, in Los Angeles.
