= Tilly Koenen =

Dutch soprano singer

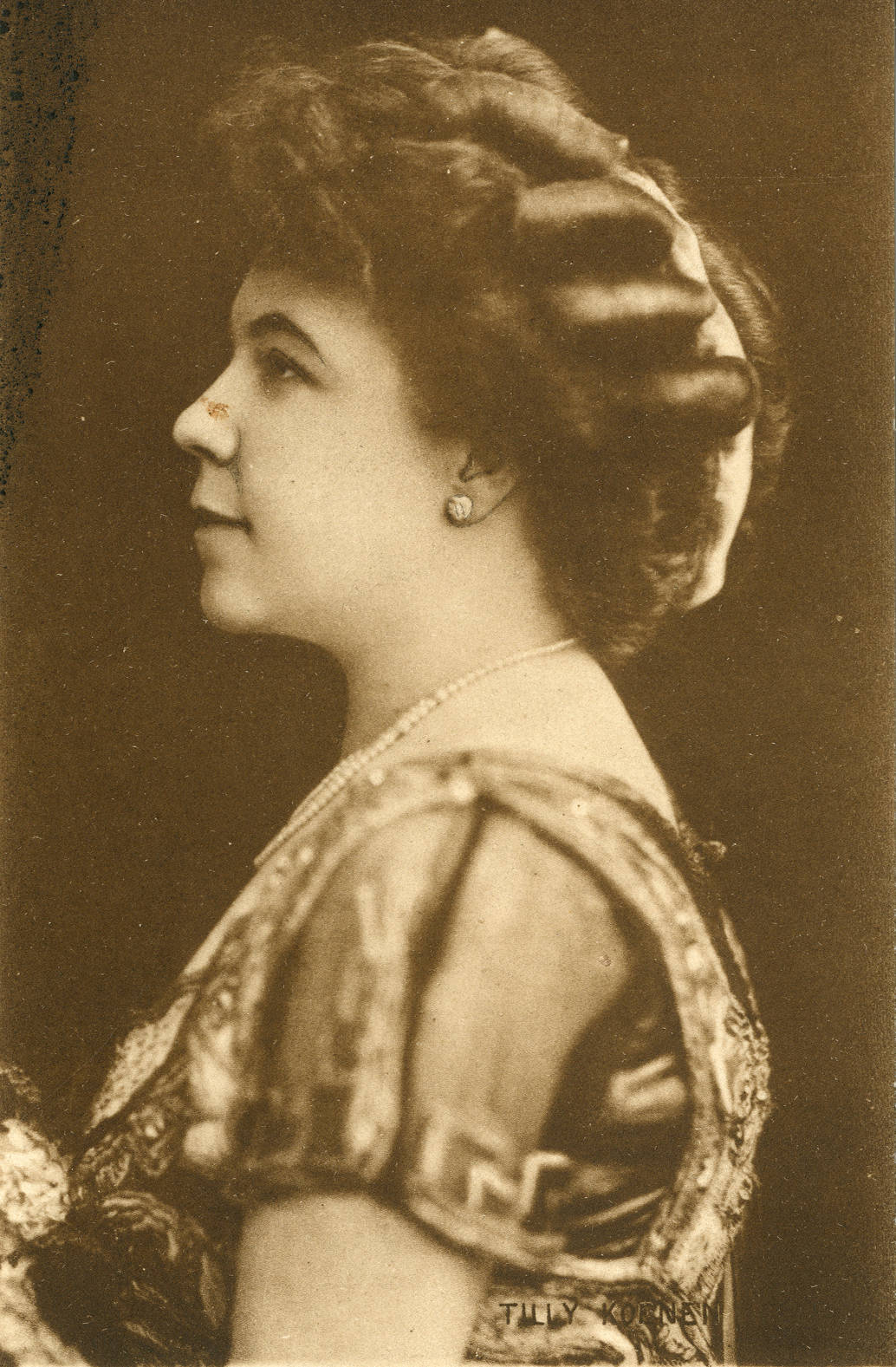
- Tilly Koenen, from a 1910 photograph.
- Born: Mathilde Karoline Koenen; 25 December 1873; Salatiga, Java
- Died: 4 January 1941; The Hague
- Occupation: Concert singer

Tilly Koenen (25 December 1873 – 4 January 1941), born Mathilde Karoline Koenen, was a Dutch concert singer.

== Early life ==
Koenen was born to Dutch parents in Salatiga, Java. She studied voice and piano at the Conservatorium in Amsterdam, with Cornélie van Zanten.

== Career ==
Koenen made her concert debut in Berlin. She worked with Constant van de Wall, performing his Maleische liederen (Malay songs). In 1908 in she sang a concert of compositions by American composer Louis von Heinrich (Luella Totten) in London, and a concert of songs by Max Meyer-Olbersleben in Berlin. She sang at the premiere of Gustav Mahler's 8th Symphony in Munich in 1910, and in one opera, Gluck's Orfeo ed Eurydice, conducted by van Zanten.

Koenen toured in the United States and Canada in 1909 and 1910, and again in 1917. She appeared at Aeolian Hall in 1917, prompting a New York Times reviewer to comment "Her voice is of the true contralto type, and as such is dark in color, rather ponderous, not easily yielding itself to the production of variety of effect of the expression of diverse emotions." She sang with the Philadelphia Orchestra with Leopold Stokowski conducting. She toured in the United States again in 1920.

== Personal life ==
Koenen died in The Hague in 1941, aged 67 years.
