= First Presbyterian Church (Girard, Kansas) =

Historic church in Kansas, United States

- U.S. National Register of Historic Places
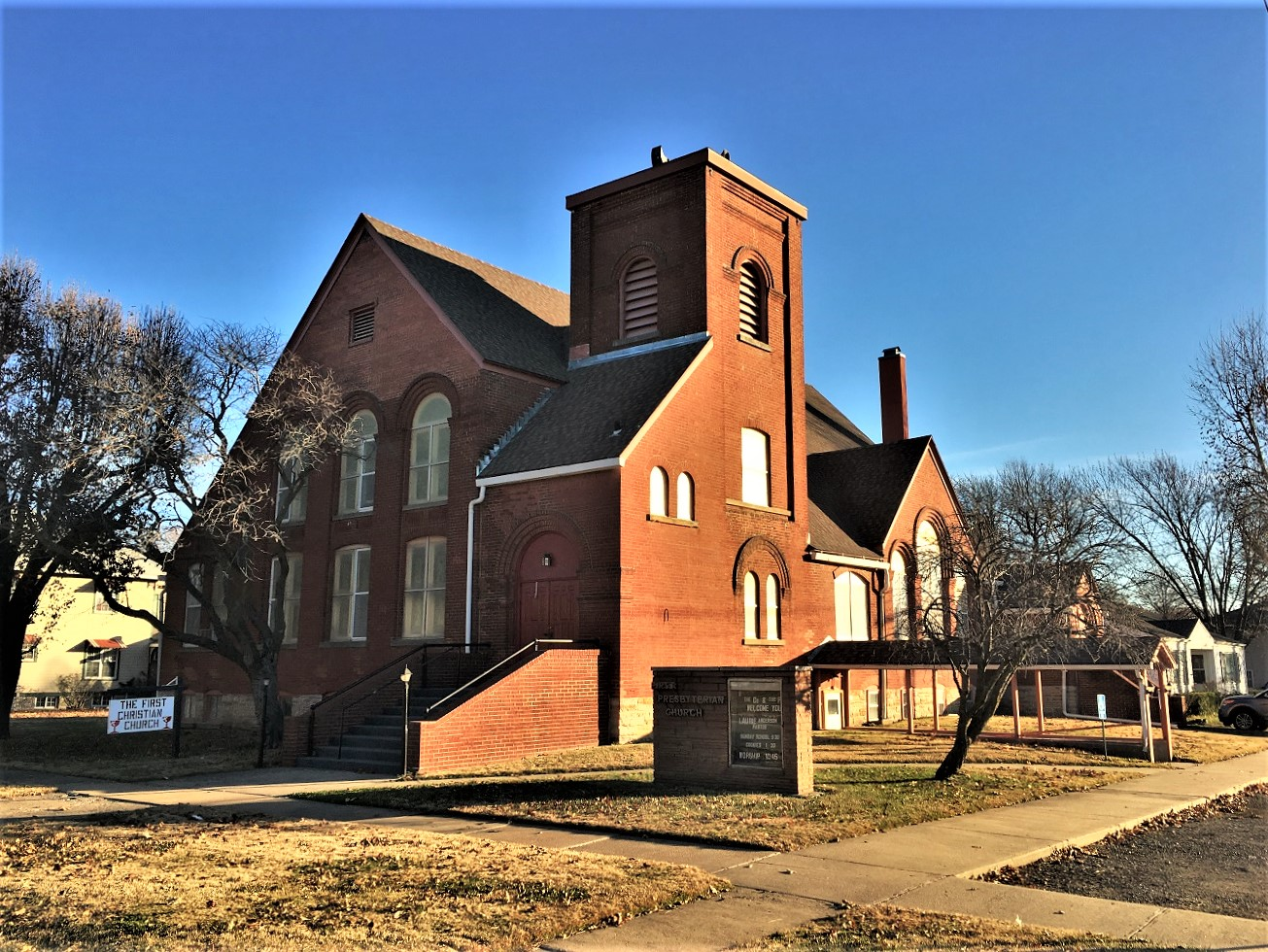

- Location within Kansas Location within the United States
- Location: 202 N. Summit; Girard, Kansas
- Coordinates: 37°30′51″N 94°50′36″W
- Area: less than one acre
- Built: 1888
- Architect: Charles Miller; Joseph Thain
- Architectural style: Romanesque
- NRHP reference No.: 09000496
- Added to NRHP: July 8, 2009

The First Presbyterian Church, also known as First Christian Church, in Girard, Kansas is a historic church at 202 N. Summit. It was built in 1888 and added to the National Register in 2009.

The first building of the congregation was built in 1871, and was destroyed by a tornado in 1886. The present church, a two-story masonry structure, was completed in 1887.
