= Julius Wayland =

American publisher & politician (1854–1912)

J. A. Wayland
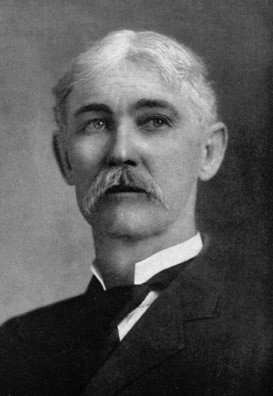
- Wayland c. 1905
- Born: Julius Augustus Wayland; April 26, 1854; Versailles, Indiana, U.S.
- Died: November 10, 1912 (aged 58); Girard, Kansas, U.S.
- Occupation: Publisher
- Spouses: Etta Bevan (died) Pearl Hunt (died 1911)

Julius Augustus Wayland (April 26, 1854 – November 10, 1912) was a Midwestern US socialist during the Progressive Era. He is most noted for publishing Appeal to Reason, a socialist publication often deemed to be the most important socialist periodical of the time.

== Early life ==
Julius Wayland was born in Versailles, Indiana, on April 26, 1854. As an infant, his father and four of his siblings died in a cholera epidemic. His early years were spent in abject poverty and he was forced to find work after only two years of schooling. He then apprenticed to a printer in his home town.

== Career ==
Wayland became owner of the Versailles Gazette in 1874. As a result of reading books such as Laurence Gronlund's The Cooperative Commonwealth and Edward Bellamy's Looking Backward, Wayland became a socialist. His writings created tensions with home-town conservatives and he fled Versailles to avoid lynching.

Moving to Pueblo, Colorado, before, Wayland started a radical periodical, after being radicalized by pamphlets given to him by an Italian cobbler.The Coming Nation, which quickly became the most popular socialist newspaper in America. At this point, he helped found a utopian settlement, the Ruskin Colony in Dickson County, Tennessee. In July 1895, he left Ruskin and moved to Kansas City, Missouri, where in August 1895, he started another socialist journal, Appeal to Reason.

In 1897, Wayland moved to Girard, Kansas. At first a mixture of articles and extracts from works by well-known socialists and radicals, Appeal to Reason began to publish writings by many of the prominent young socialists and reformers of the era, including Jack London, "Mother" Jones, Upton Sinclair, and Eugene Debs. Circulation soared, reaching 150,000 in 1902. In 1904, Appeal to Reason commissioned Upton Sinclair to write a novel about immigrant workers in the Chicago meatpacking houses. Sinclair's novel, titled The Jungle, appeared in 1905 as a serial in Appeal to Reason.

== Personal life and death ==
With his first wife Etta Bevan (1858–1898) and second wife Pearl Hunt (1871–1911), Wayland resided in a historic house in Girard. Despite being a socialist, he became a millionaire.

During the night of June 8, 1911, the 57-year old Wayland, his 39-year old wife Pearl Hunt Wayland, and a family friend and her child, were returning to the Wayland residence after an evening's drive. With J.A. at the wheel, speed was increased to about 20 miles per hour as the car headed home. Tragically, due to mechanical failure the steering wheel became disengaged from the steering shaft and the car slammed into a telephone pole, ejecting Mrs. Wayland, who suffered severe injuries to her head and torso. Pearl Wayland was taken home and a doctor called, but she died of her injuries about five hours later.

Wayland committed suicide by shooting himself with a gun on November 10, 1912, in his Girard home. He had been depressed by the recent death of his wife, his failure to convince a majority of Americans of the merits of socialism, and the smear campaign mounted against him by the conservative press. A brief suicide note was found that simply stated "The struggle under the competitive system is not worth the effort. Let it pass.” Afterward, his children and the Appeal to Reason editor Fred Warren successfully sued for damages from newspapers that had published libelous material about Wayland.

== Works ==
- Leaves of Life: A Story of Twenty Years of Socialist Agitation. Girard, KS: Appeal to Reason, 1912.
