= Girard Public Library =

- Girard Carnegie Library
- U.S. National Register of Historic Places
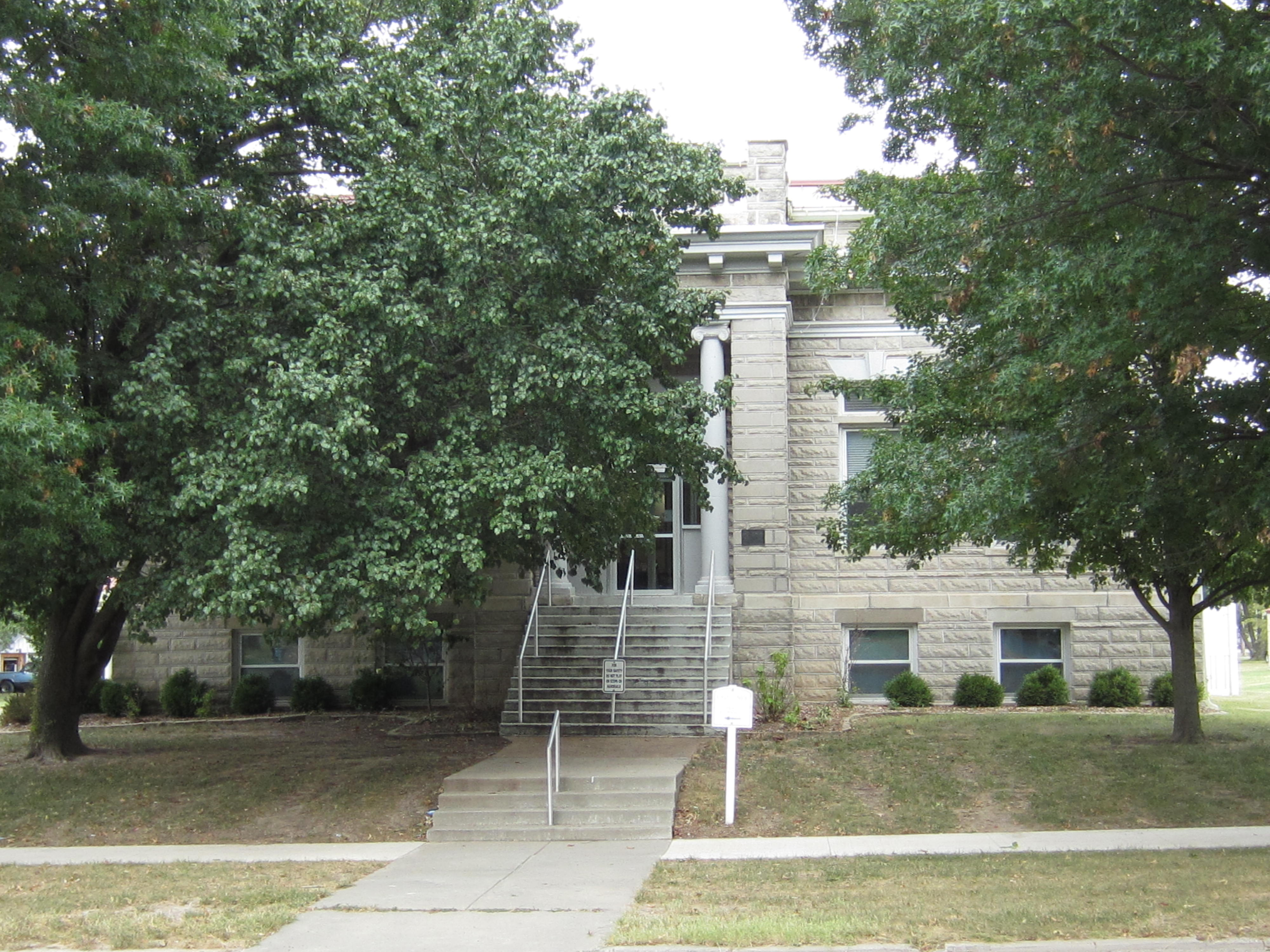
- Girard Public Library (2013)

- Location within Kansas Location within the United States
- Location: 128 W. Prairie, Girard, Kansas
- Coordinates: 37°30′37″N 94°50′42″W
- Area: less than one acre
- Built: 1906
- Built by: Ritter, A.H.
- Architect: Hair & Smith
- Architectural style: Classical Revival
- MPS: Carnegie Libraries of Kansas TR
- NRHP reference No.: 87000952
- Added to NRHP: June 25, 1987

The Girard Public Library, a Carnegie library, was established in 1899 in Girard, Kansas, United States. The original building was constructed in 1906, at 128 West Prairie Avenue. It was listed on the National Register of Historic Places in 1987. It was the first free library in the city.

== History ==
At Thanksgiving 1897, Jane Addams, founder of Hull House in Chicago, was a guest of her sister, S. Alice Haldeman, in Girard, an active worker in the Presbyterian Church. Miss Addams gave a talk at the church on "Social Settlements," and was surprised to learn at this time that Girard was without a public library, although Cherokee and Weir City had already taken such a step. In January 1898, Mrs. McKay, president of the Ladies Reading Club, appointed Mrs. Haldeman, Mrs. Griffin, Mrs. Smith, and Mrs. Wasser a committee to study the situation. A year later, January 21, 1899, representatives of the Ladies Reading Club, the Mutual Improvement Club, and the Sunflower Club met with Mrs. Haldeman and formed the Federation of City Clubs. At another meeting exactly one week later the Federation organized the Girard Library Association.

Offices were in the county courthouse until being moved to the McMillan building on the south side of the square, over E. Beadle's Store, in the spring of 1901. Mrs. Eva Mitchell was chosen as the first librarian. At that time the library had 370 books, and the librarian received 50 cents per day for keeping it open from 2 to 9 P.M. on Tuesdays, Thursdays, and Saturdays. Miss Blanche Warren became librarian in December, 1901, and served until 1936, by far the longest service of anyone who has held this post.

In 1905, Lewis H. Phillips, an attorney, backed by the Commercial Club and other organizations, succeeded in obtaining $8,000 from Andrew Carnegie on the condition that the city council would pledge maintenance. The city council acted promptly, and it was said that at a population of about 2,500, Girard was the smallest city in the world to have a Carnegie Library at that time. It was also rumored that Jane Addams was a friend of Andrew Carnegie and may have had something to do with obtaining the money.

Two lots were considered for the building of the Carnegie Library. The one chosen was the Viets lot, offered by Marion Coulter, who lived across the street to the south. The price of this 100 x 95 foot lot was $500, all of which had been pledged by residents of the neighborhood. The other lot was the Wasser lot, 100 x 100, on the northeast corner of Buffalo and Osage, opposite the home of J. E. Raymond, who offered to pay for it, the cost also being $500. By a vote of 4 to 2 the board decided on the Viets lot because it was closer to the square, although inferior to the other location in some respects.

An expansion and addition to the original Carnegie building was made in 2002.

== Predecessors ==
Girard's Carnegie library was not the first library in the city.

- In February 1870, the Crawford County Library Association met at Crawfordsville, located approximately 5 miles west of present-day Girard.
- In December 1871, the Girard Literary Institute and Library Association held a meeting. In 1875, the librarian of that organization published thanks to several individuals who had made valuable donations to the library.
- In 1882 there were over 500 books in the Public Library, and 95 new volumes had been ordered. Dr. G. A. Keyes was librarian, and kept the library in his office on the south side of the square, and John Randolph was president. It was open to members of the association at a cost of $1 per year. A festival was held that year for the benefit of the library. The same year mention was made of the A. O. U. W. (Ancient Order of United Workmen) Library.
- In 1884 John Randolph was chairman at a meeting held in the courthouse for the purpose of considering the establishment of a free library.
- In 1889 a circulating library was being established in the Veatch Music Store by two college students.
