= St. John's Episcopal Church (Girard, Kansas) =

Historic church in Kansas, United States

- U.S. National Register of Historic Places
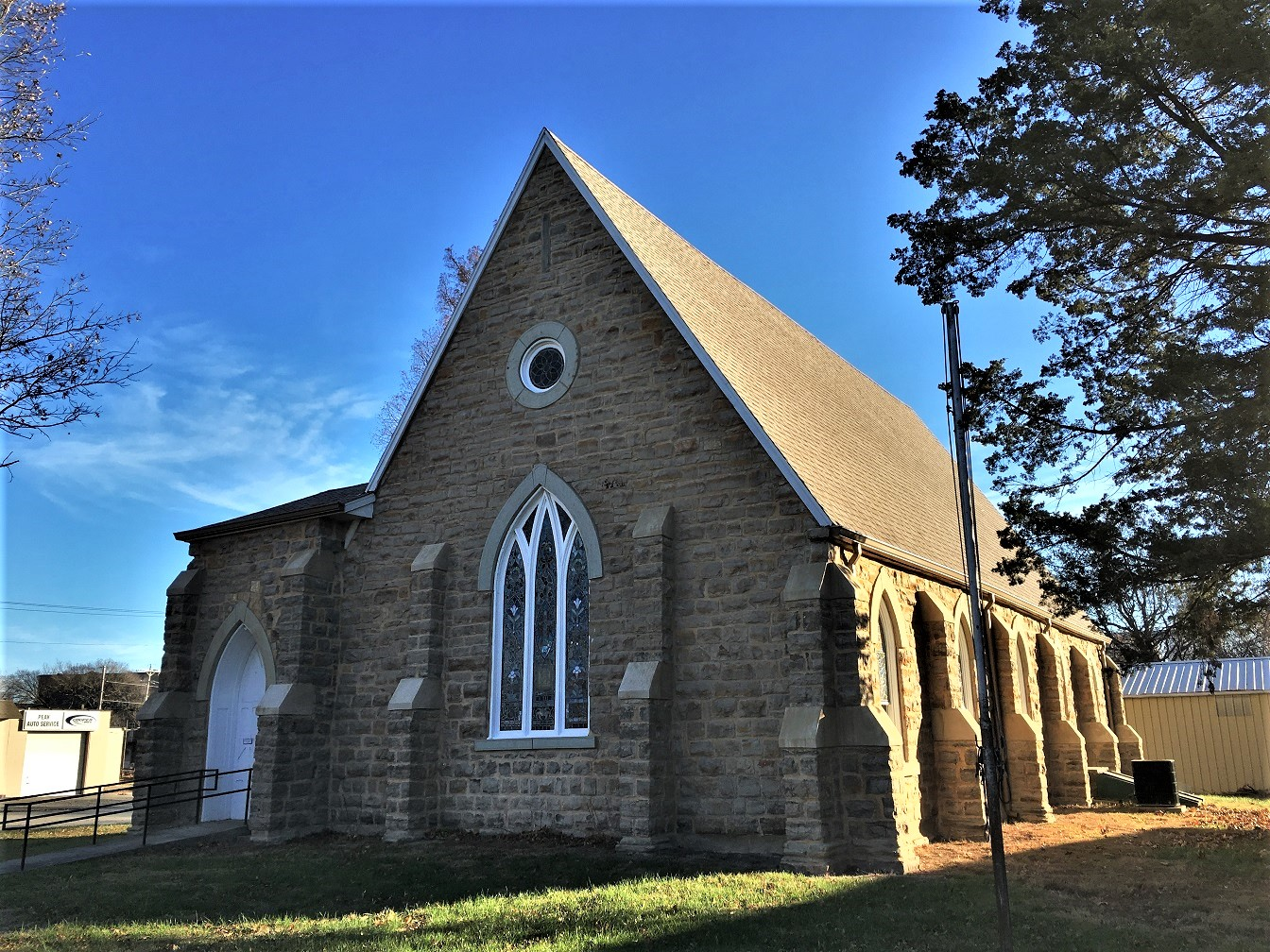

- Location within Kansas Location within the United States
- Location: SE corner of Buffalo and Summit, Girard, Kansas
- Coordinates: 37°30′28″N 94°50′35″W
- Area: less than one acre
- Built: 1888
- Architectural style: Late Gothic Revival
- NRHP reference No.: 09000226
- Added to NRHP: April 22, 2009

St. John's Episcopal Church is a historic church at the southeast corner of Buffalo and Summit in Girard, Kansas, United States. It was built in 1888 in Late Gothic Revival style and added to the National Register of Historic Places in 2009.

In 2008 the church was used by the Museum of Crawford County. In 2018 the church began being used as the Girard History Museum, and is operated by the Friends of Historic Girard & Girard History Museum.

The church is 30 by 60 feet (9.1 m × 18.3 m) in plan, and 40 feet (12 m) tall.
