= Center for Research, Evaluation and Awareness of Dyslexia =

The Center for Research, Evaluation and Awareness of Dyslexia (Center for READing) is a university-based program at Pittsburg State University in Pittsburg, Kansas, United States. It was established in 1996 to develop strategies for the prevention and remediation of reading disabilities, search for strategies that will lead to the improvement of remedial processes, provide educators and parents with current and appropriate knowledge regarding reading/learning disabilities, provide interdisciplinary evaluations of readers of all ages, promote the concerns relevant to reading disabilities and educate the general public regarding issues pertaining to reading/learning disabilities.

== Programs offered at the Center for READing ==
=== Identification and Intervention Program ===
The Identification and Intervention Program (IIP) is based on two decades worth of research and is the oldest of the programs offered at the CARRD. The purpose of the IIP is to identify children who are at-risk of developing a reading disability, also referred to as dyslexia, as soon as possible and then to provide those children with an appropriate remediation that will help them gain the fundamental skills needed to become competent readers.

The IIP is used in school systems. It identifies students in the beginning of first grade who are at-risk of developing reading difficulties and then provides them with a research-based reading tutoring program.

=== After School and Summer Program ===
The After School and Summer Program (ASSP) provides individuals with one-on-one remedial phonological and reading instruction. The ASSP serves individuals from four years of age through adult.

The first step of the ASSP is assessment. The individual is assessed in order to determine specific strengths and weaknesses in regards to basic phonological processing skills. Attentional abilities are also assessed in order to determine if attentional difficulties may be compounding the issue. Once the assessment is complete and the results are analyzed by the CARRD, a training program is constructed to aid the individual in improving deficient skills. The training program typically involves twice weekly tutoring sessions.

For school-aged children, utilizing the ASSP during the summer can be a great opportunity for the student to enhance phonological processing and reading skills during a time that students typically make minimal academic gains.

One of the main goals of the ASSP is to help individuals gain phonological awareness. The program aims to close the gap between students who are weak in phonological processing and reading skills and those who are excellent readers. In addition to one-on-one tutoring through the ASSP, parents are encouraged to assist their children at home by practicing skill-building exercises together.

=== Online Reading Screening ===
The Reading Screening is a web-based evaluation used to identify children between the ages of 5 and 12 years who are at-risk for developing or are currently experiencing reading difficulties. The Reading Screening has been used in school systems for the past 15 years and is now available online to parents, teachers, and other professionals. With 15-20% of the nation's children experiencing reading problems or dyslexia, the best way to help is to begin to understand the nature of the individual's reading difficulties. The Reading Screening provides understanding by identifying the child's strengths and weaknesses with regard to reading. Once the assessment has been completed, the website generates a Summary of Assessment, which outlines the areas of reading that are creating the most difficulties for the child. The Summary of Assessment report can be shared with school personnel to plan an appropriate intervention, if intervention is necessary.

== Problem, Impact and Philosophy ==
=== Problem ===
Estimates show that approximately 15 to 20% of the nation's children have reading difficulties. These children have the ability to learn to read, but have a specific skill deficit that prevents them from accomplishing this important task. Research indicates that most reading disabled children have a deficiency in phonological processing skills. The IIP was designed to identify and remediate this deficit before it handicaps the child's ability to learn to read.

=== Impact ===
The IIP is geared toward children who have the intellectual ability to learn to read, but find the process very difficult or impossible. Children with reading difficulties are at-risk for dropping out of school, parental abuse, poor self-esteem, and are more likely to find their way into the welfare and criminal justice systems. The future of a child with reading difficulties seems to be fairly bleak in this service-oriented society. To be successful in society, one must not only know how to read, but also do it fairly well.

The vast majority of children with learning disabilities have reading disabilities as their major impairment. In fact, many children who are considered to have a learning disable because of other obstacles also have reading difficulties.

Through the Center for READing, beginning first graders in the Pittsburg, Kansas area are assessed with the 'IIP' and are then provided with the intervention designed to eliminate the barriers that are preventing them from becoming good readers.

=== Philosophy ===
As mentioned above, individuals who use the ASSP are initially provided with an assessment. This assessment includes the Reading Screening, an assessment of intelligence (IQ test), an attentional assessment (including both a parent check-list and the TOVA test), an auditory screening, and information concerning the individual's medical, developmental, and educational history. When assessing reading difficulties, it is imperative that the individual receive evaluation in not only reading skills, but also attentional abilities. An individual who is experiencing reading difficulties may be hampered by an attentional difficulty such as attention deficit hyperactivity disorder (ADHD). It is also true that an individual who displays behaviors consistent with ADHD might actually be experiencing reading difficulties.

An individual being assessed at the CARRD is assessed on several dimensions to gain complete understanding of the individual's strengths and weaknesses.
