= Affinia =

Affinia represents many things, including the following:

- Affinia Hotels, a luxury hotel chain
- Affinia Group, a motor industry company
