= How to Win Friends and Influence People =

Self-help book by Dale Carnegie

- First edition, 11th printing (February 1937)
- Author: Dale Carnegie
- Language: English
- Subject: Self-help
- Publisher: Simon & Schuster
- Publication date: October 1936
- Publication place: United States
- Media type: Print (hardcover / paperback)
- Pages: 291 pp
- ISBN: 1-4391-6734-6
- OCLC: 40137494

How to Win Friends and Influence People is a 1936 self-help book written by Dale Carnegie. Over 30 million copies have been sold worldwide, making it one of the best-selling books of all time.

Carnegie had been conducting business education courses in New York since 1912. In 1934, Leon Shimkin, of the publishing firm Simon & Schuster, took one of Carnegie's 14-week courses on human relations and public speaking, and later persuaded Carnegie to let a stenographer take notes from the course to be revised for publication. The initial five thousand copies of the book sold exceptionally well, going through 17 editions in its first year alone.

In 1981, a revised edition containing updated language and anecdotes was released. The revised edition reduced the number of sections from six to four, eliminating sections on effective business letters and improving marital satisfaction. In 2011, it was number 19 on Time's list of the 100 most influential Nonfiction books.

In 2022, a newly revised edition was published.

== Origins ==
Before How to Win Friends and Influence People was released, the genre of self-help books had an ample heritage. Authors such as Orison Swett Marden and Samuel Smiles had enormous success with their self-help books in the late 19th and early 20th centuries.

Dale Carnegie began his career teaching night classes at a YMCA in New York, later expanding to YMCAs in Philadelphia and Baltimore. He then taught independently at hotels in London, Paris, New York, Boston, Philadelphia, and Baltimore, writing small booklets to go along with his courses. After one of his 14-week courses, he was approached by publisher Leon Shimkin of the publishing house Simon & Schuster. Shimkin urged Carnegie to write a book, but he was not initially persuaded. Shimkin then hired a stenographer to type up what he heard in one of Carnegie's long lectures and presented the transcript to Carnegie, who edited and revised it into a final form.

To market the book, Shimkin sent 500 copies of the book to former graduates of the Dale Carnegie Course, with a note that pointed out the utility of the book for refreshing students with the advice they had learned. The 500 mailed copies brought orders for over 5,000 more copies of the book and Simon & Schuster had to increase the original print order of 1,200 quickly. Shimkin also ran a full-page ad in the New York Times complete with quotes by Andrew Carnegie and John D. Rockefeller on the importance of human relations.

Originally published in November 1936, the book reached the New York Times best-seller list by the end of the year, and did not fall off for the next two years. Simon & Schuster continued to advertise the book relying heavily on testimonials as well as the testable approach the book offered.

== 1981 edition ==
The 1981 edition of How to Win Friends and Influence People is broken into the following parts: "Twelve Things This Book Will Do For You", "Fundamental Techniques in Handling People", "Twelve Ways to Win People to Your Way of Thinking", and "Be a Leader: How to Change People Without Giving Offense or Arousing Resentment".

Sections on effective business letters ("Letters That Produced Miraculous Results") and improving marital satisfaction ("Seven Rules for Making Your Home Life Happier") were removed.

Since the original release, examples and stories used in the books were adjusted to remain more relevant. Newer editions have only 4 parts to the book, including "Fundamental Techniques in Handling People", "Six Ways to Make People Like You", "How to Win People to Your way of Thinking", and "Be a Leader: How to Change People Without Giving Offense or Arousing Resentment".

== 2022 edition ==
Simon and Schuster published another revised edition in 2022, which was supervised by the author's daughter Donna Dale Carnegie. This new edition appears to reverse some of the cuts made in the 1981 version, since it advertises that it contains "priceless material restored from the original 1936 text."

== Reception ==
How to Win Friends and Influence People became one of the most successful books in American history. It went through 17 print editions in its first year of publishing and sold 250,000 copies in the first three months. The book has sold over 30 million copies worldwide since and annually sells in excess of 250,000 copies. A 2013 Library of Congress survey ranked Carnegie's volume as the seventh most influential book in American history.

How to Win Friends and Influence People was number eight on the list of "Top Check Outs Of All Time" by the New York Public Library.

After How to Win Friends and Influence People was published in November 1936 and ascended rapidly on best-seller lists, the New York Times reviewed it in February 1937. They offered a balanced criticism, arguing that Carnegie indeed offered insightful advice in dealing with people, but that his wisdom was extremely simple and should not overrule the foundation of actual knowledge.

The satirical writer Sinclair Lewis waited a year to offer his scathing critique. He described Carnegie's method as teaching people to "smile and bob and pretend to be interested in other people's hobbies precisely so that you may screw things out of them." However, despite the criticism, sales continued to soar and the book was talked about and reviewed as it rapidly became mainstream.

Scholarly critique was little and oscillated over time. Due to the book's lay appeal, it was not significantly discussed in academic journals. In the early stages of the book's life, the few scholarly reviews that were written explained the contents of the book and attempted to describe what made the book popular. As time passed, however, scholarly reviews became more critical, chiding Carnegie for being insincere and manipulative.

How to Win Friends and Influence People was written for a popular audience and Carnegie successfully captured the attention of his target. The book experienced mass consumption and appeared in many popular periodicals, including garnering 10 pages in the January 1937 edition of Reader's Digest.

The book continued to remain at the top of best-seller lists and was even noted in the New York Times to have been extremely successful in Nazi Germany, much to the writer's bewilderment. It was written that Carnegie would rate "butter higher than guns as a means of winning friends" something "diametrically opposite to the official German view."

Carnegie described his book as an "action-book" but it is today categorized as one of the first in the self-help genre. Almost every self-help book since has borrowed some type of style or form from Carnegie's "path-breaking best seller."

== Major sections and points ==
=== Twelve Things This Book Will Do For You ===
This section was included in the original 1936 edition as a single page list, which preceded the main content of the book, showing a prospective reader what to expect from it. The 1981 edition omits points 6 to 8 and 11.

1. Get you out of a mental rut, give you new thoughts, new visions, new ambitions.
2. Enable you to make friends quickly and easily.
3. Increase your popularity.
4. Help you to win people to your way of thinking.
5. Increase your influence, your prestige, your ability to get things done.
6. Enable you to win new clients, new customers.
7. Increase your earning power.
8. Make you a better salesman, a better executive.
9. Help you to handle complaints, avoid arguments, keep your human contacts smooth and pleasant.
10. Make you a better speaker, a more entertaining conversationalist.
11. Make the principles of psychology easy for you to apply in your daily contacts.
12. Help you to arouse enthusiasm among your associates.

The book has six major sections. The core principles of each section are quoted below.

=== Fundamental Techniques in Handling People ===
1. Don't criticize, condemn, or complain.
2. Give honest and sincere appreciation.
3. Arouse in the other person an eager want.

=== Six Ways to Make People Like You ===
1. Become genuinely interested in other people.
2. Smile.
3. Remember that a person's name is, to that person, the sweetest and most important sound in any language.
4. Be a good listener. Encourage others to talk about themselves.
5. Talk in terms of the other person's interest.
6. Make the other person feel important – and do it sincerely.

=== Twelve Ways to Win People to Your Way of Thinking ===
1. The only way to get the best of an argument is to avoid it.
2. Show respect for the other person's opinions. Never say "You're Wrong."
3. If you're wrong, admit it quickly and emphatically.
4. Begin in a friendly way.
5. Start with questions to which the other person will answer yes.
6. Let the other person do a great deal of the talking.
7. Let the other person feel the idea is his or hers.
8. Try honestly to see things from the other person's point of view.
9. Be sympathetic with the other person's ideas and desires.
10. Appeal to the nobler motives.
11. Dramatize your ideas.
12. Throw down a challenge.

=== Be a Leader: How to Change People Without Giving Offense or Arousing Resentment ===
1. Begin with praise and honest appreciation.
2. Call attention to people's mistakes indirectly.
3. Talk about your own mistakes before criticizing the other person.
4. Ask questions instead of giving direct orders.
5. Let the other person save face.
6. Praise every improvement.
7. Give the other person a fine reputation to live up to.
8. Use encouragement. Make the fault seem easy to correct.
9. Make the other person happy about doing what you suggest.

=== Letters That Produced Miraculous Results ===
This section was included in the original 1936 edition but omitted from the revised 1981 edition.

In this chapter, notably the shortest in the book, Carnegie analyzes two letters and describes how to appeal to someone's vanity with the term "do me a favor" as opposed to directly asking for something which does not offer the same feeling of importance to the recipient of the request.

=== Seven Rules For Making Your Home Life Happier ===
This section was included in the original 1936 edition but omitted from the revised 1981 edition.

1. Don't nag.
2. Don't try to make your partner over.
3. Don't criticize.
4. Give honest appreciation.
5. Pay little attentions.
6. Be courteous.
7. Read a good book on the sexual side of marriage.

== Legacy ==
- Warren Buffett took the Dale Carnegie course "How to Win Friends and Influence People" when he was 20 years old, and as of 2009 kept the diploma in his office.
- The book is said to have greatly influenced the life of television and film actress Donna Reed. It was given to her by her high school chemistry teacher Edward Tompkins to read as a sophomore at Denison (Iowa) High School in 1936. Upon reading it, she won the lead in the school play, was voted Campus Queen, and was in the top 10 of the 1938 graduating class.
- Charles Manson used what he learned from the book in prison to manipulate others into killing on his behalf.
- During the 1998 kidnapping of LDS missionaries in Saratov, Russia, the kidnapped missionaries used strategies from the book in an attempt for leniency from their captors.
- The title of Lenny Bruce's autobiography How to Talk Dirty and Influence People directly parodies the title of Dale's book.
