= The Benjamin Royal Sonesta New York =

Hotel in Manhattan, New York

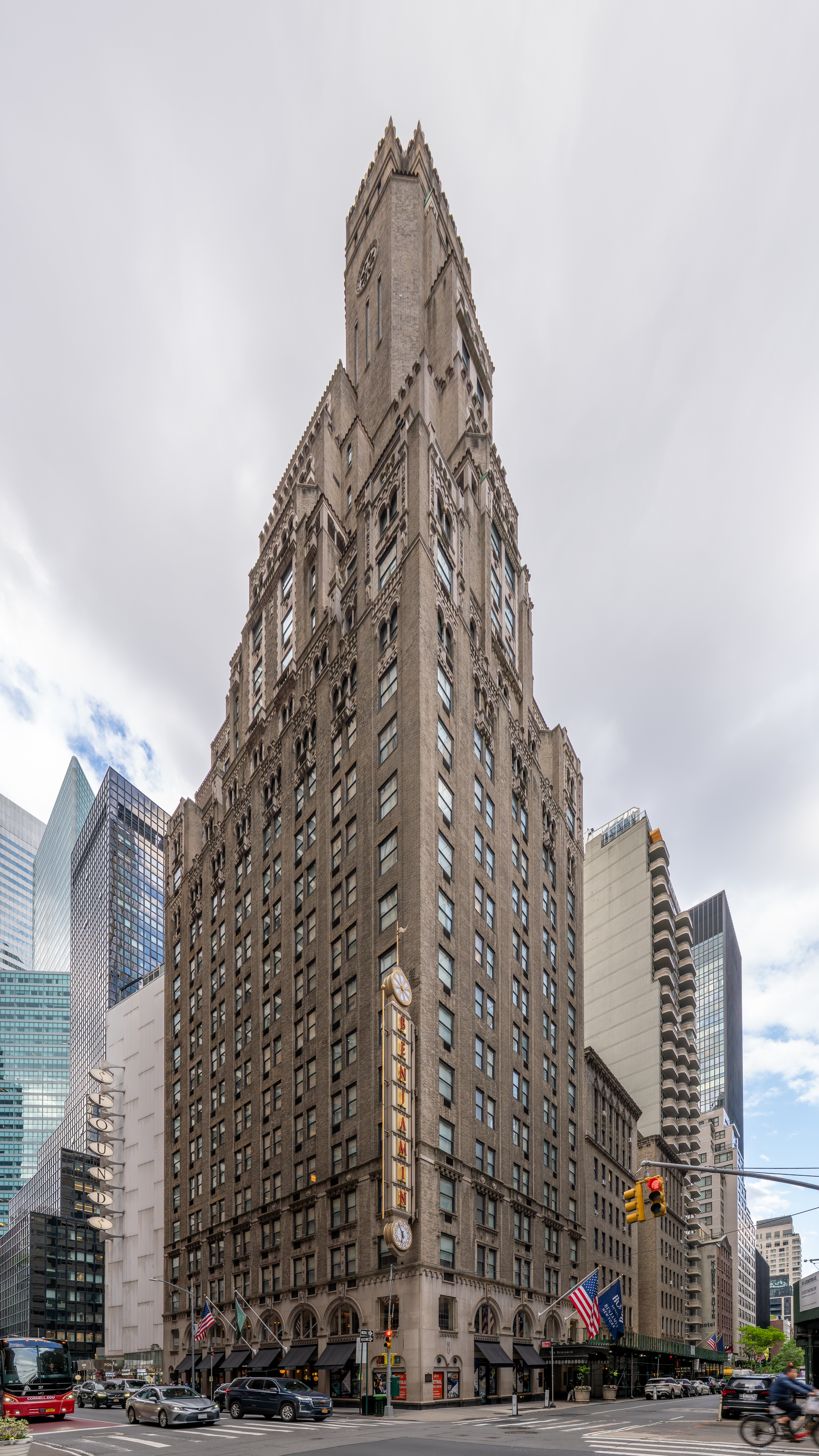
- Interactive map of the The Benjamin Royal Sonesta New York area

General information
- Location: 125 East 50th Street, New York, NY, 10017
- Coordinates: 40°45′24″N 73°58′19″W
- Construction started: 1926
- Opening: 1927
- Owner: Sonesta International Hotels

Technical details
- Floor count: 29

Design and construction
- Architects: Emery Roth, Sylvan Bien

Website
- Official website

New York City Landmark
- Designated: November 22, 2016
- Reference no.: 2555

The Benjamin Royal Sonesta New York (formerly the Beverly Hotel and Benjamin Hotel) is a hotel at 125 East 50th Street, at the northeast corner with Lexington Avenue, in the Midtown Manhattan neighborhood of New York City. The 29-story hotel was designed by Emery Roth in the neo-Romanesque style and contains 209 rooms. The Benjamin, one of several hotels developed around Grand Central Terminal as part of Terminal City, is a New York City designated landmark.

The hotel building's facade consists largely of limestone and brick. The building contains light courts facing east, as well as setbacks to comply with the 1916 Zoning Resolution, which taper to an octagonal tower at the top of the hotel. The limestone base is two stories high and contains storefronts and a main entrance on 50th Street. The upper stories are generally clad with brick and contain architectural terracotta and cast stone ornamentation. The hotel contained a double-height lobby, which was originally designed in the Spanish style, as well as a restaurant. The upper stories were divided into 177 apartments of one to four rooms each, although these were rearranged into 209 guestrooms in 1999.

Moses Ginsberg developed the structure as an apartment hotel named the Beverly, which opened in October 1927. Ginsberg continued to operate the Beverly until 1951, when he sold it to real-estate investor Irving Maidman. International Hotels Inc. bought the Beverly in 1959 and renovated it. After a series of sales in the late 20th century, Manhattan East Suite Hotels (later Denihan Hospitality Group) acquired the Beverly in 1997 and renovated it over the next two years, renaming the hotel the Benjamin. The hotel was again renovated between 2010 and 2013, and Sonesta International Hotels acquired the Benjamin in 2021.

== Site ==
The Benjamin Hotel (originally the Beverly Hotel) is at 125 East 50th Street, on the northeastern corner of Lexington Avenue, in the Midtown Manhattan neighborhood of New York City. It sits on the southwestern portion of a city block bounded by Lexington Avenue to the west, 50th Street to the south, Third Avenue to the east, and 51st Street to the north. The Benjamin occupies a nearly rectangular land lot with an area of 7,499 ft^{2} (697 m^{2}). The site has a frontage of 1,002 ft (305 m) on Lexington Avenue and 71 ft (22 m) on 50th Street.

569 Lexington Avenue is to the north on the same block, and St. Bartholomew's Episcopal Church and the General Electric Building are to the west. The Benjamin is also near the Waldorf Astoria New York to the southwest and 345 Park Avenue to the northwest. An entrance to the New York City Subway's Lexington Avenue/51st Street station, served by the 6, <6>, E, F, and <F> trains, is across Lexington Avenue from the hotel. The Beverly was part of Hotel Alley, a collection of hotels developed along Lexington Avenue in the early 20th century. Many of the hostelries on Hotel Alley had been built in part to serve the now-demolished Grand Central Palace on Lexington Avenue between 46th and 47th Streets.

== Architecture ==
The hotel was designed in the neo-Romanesque style by Emery Roth, assisted by associate architect Sylvan Bien. The hotel's construction involved numerous contractors. Although the hotel has 29 physical stories, New York City Department of Buildings documents cite the 26th floor as the highest usable floor, skipping the thirteenth floor. Because there is no 13th floor, the New York City Landmarks Preservation Commission (LPC) describes the hotel as having 25 habitable stories. Conversely, the author Steven Ruttenbaum characterizes the hotel as being 30 stories high.

=== Form and facade ===
The first two stories of the facade are clad with limestone, above which the facade is largely made of gray-brown brick. The hotel originally contained casement windows on its facade. The building's facade has cast stone and terracotta ornamentation; over the years, some of the brick and mortar has been replaced, and air-conditioner openings have been installed on the facade.

The hotel contains various setbacks on its exterior, with its massing tapering from a rectangular base to an octagonal tower. The setbacks on three sides of the building contain terraces, which were accessed by French doors leading from the adjacent apartments. The eastern elevation of the facade contains a light court and sets back above the 23rd story, while the northern elevation sets back above the 25th story. When the Beverly Hotel opened, the rooms were illuminated by sunlight on the west, south, and east. The top of the building has a water tower with wheel windows; a pavilion with arched windows; red Spanish-tiled roofs; and a copper finial.

==== Base ====
Base details

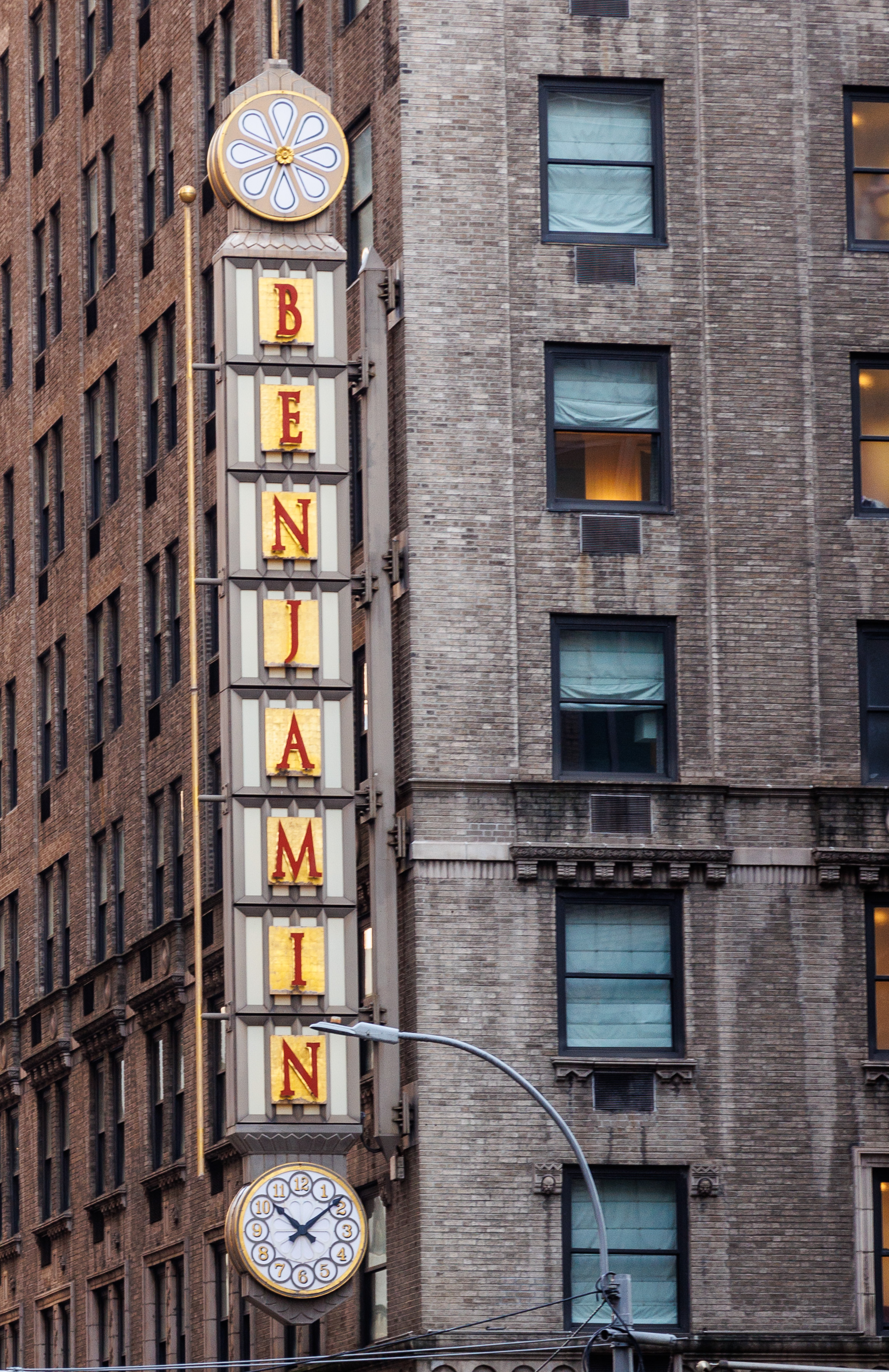
Signage

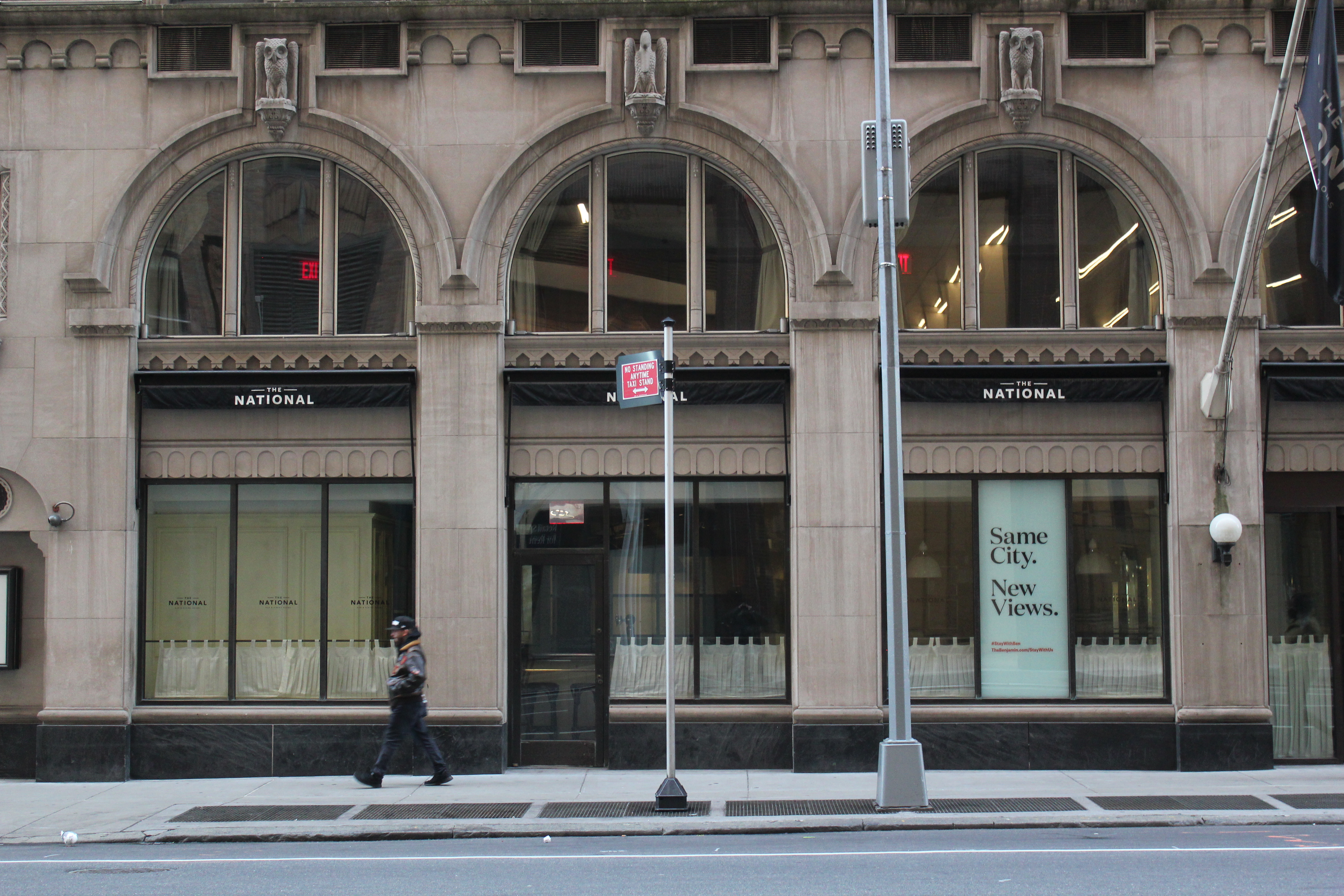
Lexington Avenue windows

The base of the facade contains double-height arched openings in the Romanesque style. On both 50th Street and Lexington Avenue, the first story of each arched opening contains storefronts, and the arches are each divided into three panes at the second story. The hotel's main entrance, near the eastern end of the 50th Street elevation, is sheltered by a bronze-and-glass marquee. Originally, the hotel contained a second entrance on the Lexington Avenue facade, which led to the hotel's dining room. The keystones above the arches contain corbels with foliate decoration, which are alternatively topped by sculptures of owls or pelicans.

The outermost bays contain reconstructed double arches at the first story, which include roundels and bas-reliefs. Above these are rectangular windows, which contain window sills with corbel tables and are flanked by engaged columns. On both 50th Street and Lexington Avenue, numerous objects have been installed at the base over the years, including flagpoles, security cameras, display boxes, signs, ventilation openings, and utility meters. In addition, arched corbel tables are placed above the second story and below each setback.

==== Upper stories ====
On the upper stories of the Lexington Avenue and 50th Street elevations, each of the outer bays has one window per floor, while the center bays each have two windows per floor. On the third story, the center bays have terracotta frames and are separated by mullions with terracotta decoration, while the outer bays contain corbels that depict warriors' heads. The fourth-story windows contain corbel tables, as well as spandrel panels with rosettes and plaques, beneath their window sills. At the fifth story, a band course runs horizontally across the facade; it contains spandrel panels with roundels, in addition to a carved window sill beneath each fifth-story window.

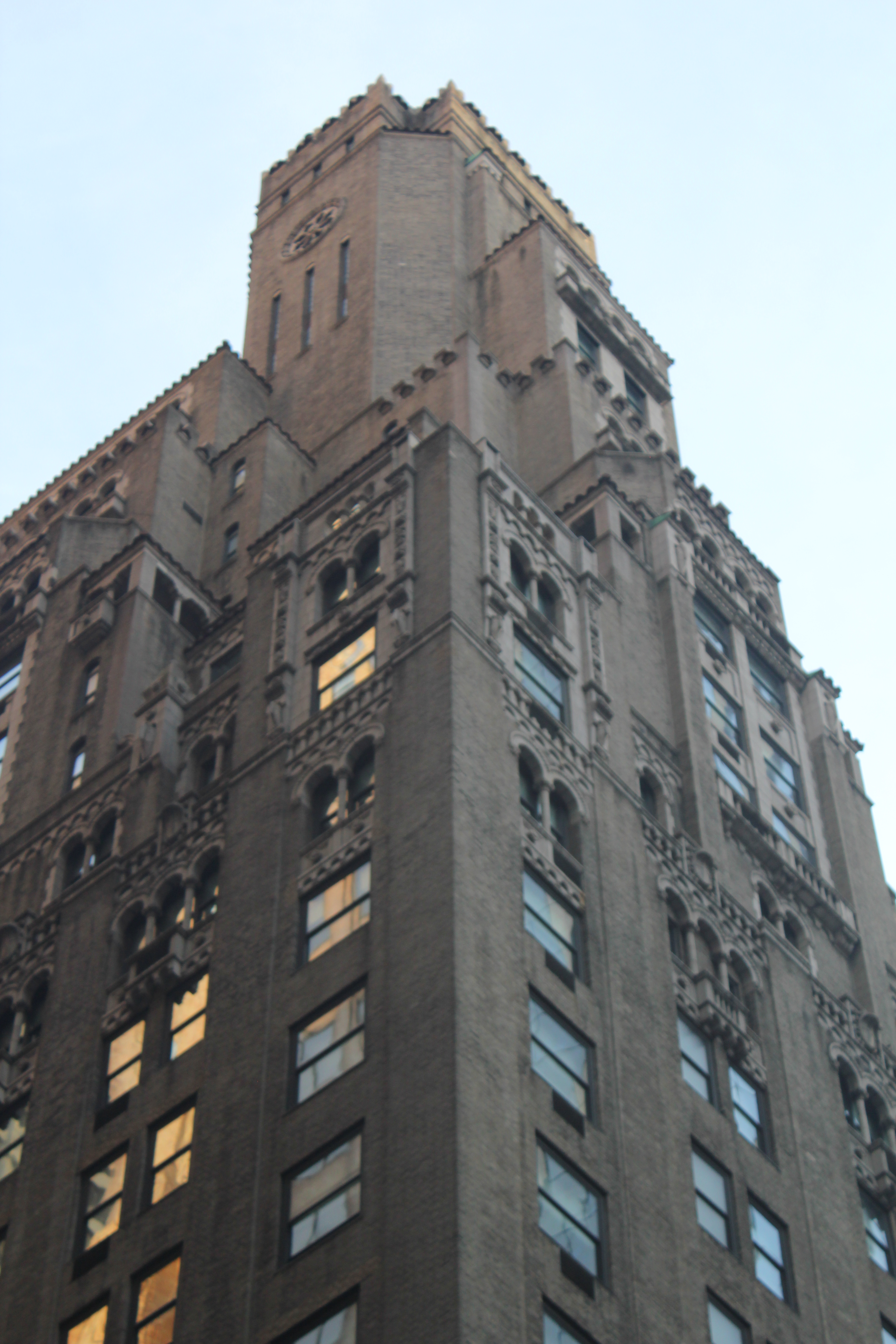
Setbacks at the top of the hotel

The windows on the 14th story are designed similarly to an arcade, with three arched windows per bay; each of the windows contains columns and imposts that are topped by curved lintels. The spandrel panels above the 14th story contain rosettes, and the center bays have balconettes with corbel tables. The outer windows on the 15th and 16th stories contain terracotta frames and are flanked by ornamental piers that contain carvings of pelicans. The center bays at the 15th story have flat-headed windows with ornate frames, in addition to lintels with rosettes, while the outer bays contain balconies with cartouches and spandrel panels with balustrades. At the 16th story, the center windows are designed like arcades, with columns, imposts, and curved windows. On the 17th through 19th stories, the windows in the center bays contain terracotta frames, balconettes, and spandrels with rosettes. In addition, the 17th story contains niches with pelicans and finials, and the 19th story contains terraces sheltered by porticos. The 19th-story terraces on 50th Street contain balconettes with rosettes, while those on Lexington Avenue contain niches with pelicans.

On both the Lexington Avenue and 50th Street elevations, the 20th story contains a bay that is angled away from the rest of the facade; this bay contains arcaded windows, balconettes, and corbel tables. Both elevations have arcaded windows on two additional stories, which contain balconettes. These arcaded windows are located on the 22nd and 24th stories of the 50th Street elevation and on the 22nd and 25th stories of the Lexington Avenue elevation. The top levels have setbacks with crenelation, and the 50th Street elevation contains a chimney with ornamental cap.

=== Interior ===
==== Base ====
Initially, the hotel had six ground-level storefronts facing Lexington Avenue, as well as eleven offices on the second floor facing Lexington Avenue or 50th Street. The hotel originally contained what The New York Times described as a "voluptuous Spanish-style lobby, encrusted like a galleon, in blue, maroon, gold and amber". The double-height lobby contained ornate plaster decorations. The room was surrounded by marble wainscoting, with inlaid panels above a black-marble baseboard; the window frames and doorways were also clad with inlaid multicolored marble. The lobby floor had a velvet carpet decorated with blue floral motifs and silver and gold accents. The lobby had a vaulted ceiling, which contained six hanging bronze lanterns with amber panes. One wall contained a set of three stained glass windows. Floor lamps and wall brackets provided additional illumination, and there was red furniture. The hotel's main elevator banks were placed across from the stained-glass windows. Almost all of this decoration has since been removed.

The hotel had a two-story restaurant that could fit 300 people. The upper story of the restaurant contained private dining rooms and connected with the lobby's mezzanine. The restaurant had art glass windows, as well as a ceiling that was painted to give the impression of inlaid woodwork. By 1999, the hotel had a lounge above its lobby. The hotel operated the Woodstock Spa as well.

==== Upper stories ====
The Beverly originally operated as an apartment hotel with 177 apartments. These units were served by two passenger elevators, a freight elevator, and two staircases. The units were located on the third through 26th floors and had between one and four rooms. The apartments on the lower floors contained one or two rooms, a serving pantry, foyer, and bathroom and were placed on either side of a corridor. Some of these apartments contained dining alcoves. Many apartments on the upper floors, above the 15th story, contained three rooms. The apartments on these stories were generally larger and included outdoor terraces on the setbacks, as well as full-sized dining rooms. When the hotel opened, there was high demand for apartments with outdoor terraces. The top four stories contained mechanical equipment.

The modern-day bedrooms begin at the fifth floor. When the hotel was renovated in 1999, there were 209 rooms; these included 97 one-bedroom suites, as well as one suite with two bedrooms. The rooms ranged from 350 to 750 square feet (33 to 70 m^{2}), larger than typical hotel rooms in Manhattan. Each of the rooms had a refrigerator, a microwave, and high ceilings and was decorated in a cream-and-beige color scheme. The suites had pull-out sofas and wet bars, and several suites had access to outdoor terraces. The bathrooms had stainless-steel furnishings. All of the units were soundproofed. As of 2024, the hotel has 209 units. The hotel has 98 suites (including two named suites, the Beverly and the Benjamin) with Manhattan–themed artwork and lounge seats. The Beverly Suite has a marble dining table and a "library wall" in its living room, while the Benjamin Suite has a conference table and an "art wall" in its living room.

== History ==
The construction of Grand Central Terminal began in 1903 on the site of Grand Central Depot, following a fatal crash in the Park Avenue Tunnel, the only approach to the depot, the preceding year. Grand Central Terminal opened on February 2, 1913. Passenger traffic on the commuter lines into Grand Central more than doubled in the years following the terminal's completion. The terminal spurred development in the surrounding area, particularly in Terminal City, a commercial and office district created above where the tracks were covered. Terminal City soon became Manhattan's most desirable commercial and office district. A 1920 New York Times article said, "With its hotels, office buildings, apartments and underground Streets it not only is a wonderful railroad terminal, but also a great civic centre." The Beverly was one of several hotels developed in Terminal City, along with other hostelries such as the Barclay, Commodore, Roosevelt, and Biltmore.

Meanwhile, during the early 19th century, apartment developments in the city were generally associated with the working class. By the late 19th century, apartments were also becoming desirable among the middle and upper classes. Between 1880 and 1885, more than ninety apartment buildings were developed in the city. Apartment hotels in New York City became more popular after World War I, particularly among wealthy people who wanted to live luxuriously but also wanted to do some of their own housework, such as cooking. Developers of apartment hotels sometimes constructed developments to bypass the Tenement House Law, which prevented new apartment buildings from being taller than 150 percent of the width of the adjacent street. Apartment hotels had less stringent regulations on sunlight, ventilation, and emergency stairs but had to contain communal spaces like dining rooms.

=== Development and early years ===
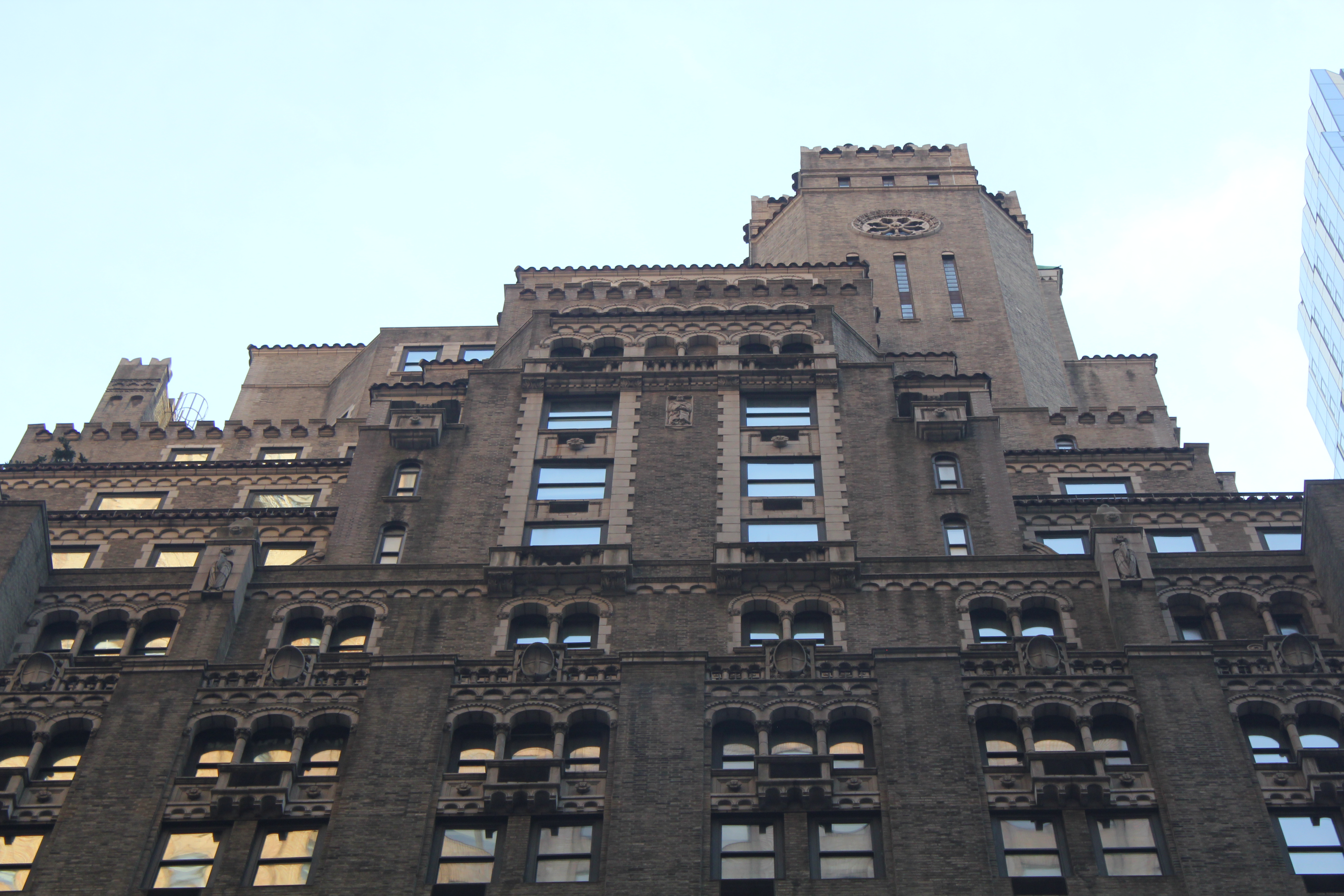
Upper stories as seen from Lexington Avenue

The Beverly Hotel was developed by Moses Ginsberg, who went on to develop the Carlyle Hotel. In contrast to Roth's earlier Ritz Tower on Park Avenue, a classically styled building in an upper-class neighborhood, the Beverly Hotel was developed in a middle-class area with fewer classical details. Ginsberg announced plans for a 25-story hotel on the site in November 1926. The structure would be designed in the Italian Renaissance style and measure 100 by 71 feet (30 by 22 m) across; the first 15 stories would occupy the entire site, while the upper stories would taper off above a series of setbacks. The structure was to cost $2.5 million and was developed by the Lexington-Concord Corporation. By early 1927, many of the hotel's apartments were being leased.

The restaurant at the hotel's base opened at the end of September 1927, and A. G. Walker & Co. was appointed as the renting agent for the Beverly, which was completed in early October 1927. Most of the apartments had been rented out at the time of the hotel's opening, including many of the apartments with terraces. Among the earliest occupants of the hotel was Louise Cromwell Brooks, the wife of Douglas MacArthur, who had rented the entirety of the 26th floor. Other tenants included explorer Richard E. Byrd, actor Lionel Atwill, accountant Jacob K. Lasser, and financier and art collector Chester Dale. The hotel hosted such events as the wedding of Russian prince Vladimir Koudacheff in 1927. The Beverly was one of several large buildings to be completed on Lexington Avenue in the late 1920s.

=== 20th century ===
A New York Supreme Court judge ordered in August 1935 that the $1.255 million mortgage loan on the hotel be reorganized and extended for five years. The Beverly's previous operators continued to manage the hotel. The Beverly was redecorated in 1938, and the air-conditioning in the dining room was replaced. The hotel was valued at $2.2 million by 1946.

The investor Irving Maidman began negotiating with Beverly Hotel Inc. (led by Moses Ginsberg) and 131 E. 50th Street Corp. to acquire the hotel in October 1951. Shortly after these negotiations, another potential buyer offered to acquire the Beverly for $250,000 more than what Maidman offered, prompting Maidman to file a lis pendens against Ginsberg's companies, preventing Ginsberg from selling the hotel to another entity. At the time, Maidman had already resold his contract for the acquisition of the hotel. A New York state judge ruled in July 1952 that Ginsberg had to sell the hotel and a neighboring building to Maidman for about $2.1 million, even though the buyer and seller had not made a formal contract. As part of the deal, Maidman would assume the $700,000 mortgage loan that Connecticut Mutual Life Insurance had placed on the hotel. Maidman officially took title to the hotel in December 1952. At the time, the hotel contained 305 rooms.

International Hotels Inc. bought the hotel from Maidman in February 1959. That April, International Hotels announced that the Beverly would be renovated over the next five months to designs by Henry End; the renovation included the entrance, lobby, and guestrooms. After the renovation was completed, Sidney Schwartz agreed to buy the hotel in March 1961, and he leased the Beverly that June to Henry Speter and Murray Knight, who paid $18.745 million to lease the hotel for 16 years. Schwartz took title to the hotel in August 1961, shortly after being elected president of the Warren Servicing Corporation, which underwrote a syndicated loan for the hotel. Frederick Dreier bought the Beverly in 1967, at which point the hotel's lease was valued at $3.75 million.

Over the years, the facade of the lower stories had been renovated with what the LPC called an "unsympathetic design". The hotel underwent further renovations in the mid-1980s. The hotel was catering almost exclusively to short-term guests by 1990, when it had one long-term resident. By then, Newsday described the Beverly as a "small, family-operated, European-style hotel". The hotel had 191 guestrooms at the time.

=== Denihan and Sonesta operation ===
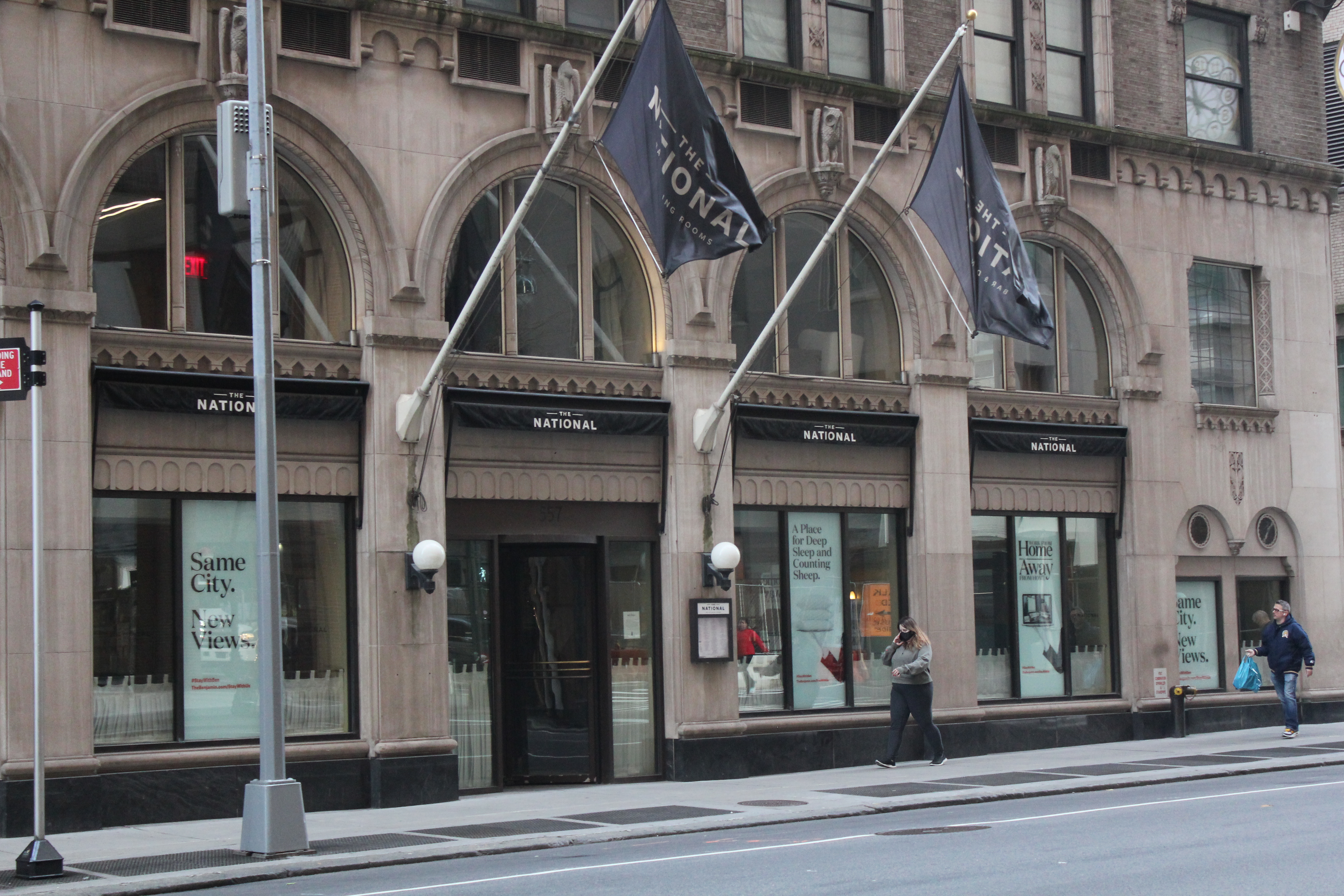
Lexington Avenue facade, ground level

The Highgate Corporation bought the hotel in September 1997 for $38 million. Two months later, Highgate resold the Beverly to the Manhattan East Suite Hotels, owned by the Denihan family. Manhattan East Suite Hotels spent $45 million on renovations. The Beverly reopened in April 1999 and was renamed the Benjamin, after Benjamin J. Denihan Sr., who had founded Manhattan East Suite Hotels. The renovated hotel contained the An American Place restaurant, operated by Larry Forgione, who was responsible for all food service at the hotel as well. The rebranded hotel continued to serve short-term guests, but it also offered discounts to guests who planned to become long-term residents. The Benjamin introduced a "pillow menu" with 11 types of pillows; the hotel hired a "sleep concierge" in 2001 due to an increase in the number of guests with sleep-related queries. To attract guests after the September 11 attacks, the hotel began offering promotions to business travelers.

Restaurateur Terrance Brennan took over An American Place in 2002 and renamed it Terrance Brennan's Sea Food and Chop House. Manhattan East Suite Hotels was rebranded as Affinia Hospitality in 2003, then as Denihan Hospitality Group, which continued to operate the Benjamin. By the mid-2000s, the Benjamin was no longer being marketed to long-term guests. In 2010, David Rockwell renovated the hotel's restaurant space into the National, a restaurant operated by Geoffrey Zakarian. By then, the Denihan chain had hundreds of millions of dollars in debt. As a result, Pebblebrook Hotel Trust announced in June 2011 that it would acquire a 49-percent ownership stake in the Benjamin and five of Denihan's other hotels for $910 million, with Pebblebrook assuming $294 million of Denihan's debt. The agreement was finalized two months later, although Denihan continued to manage the Benjamin. Pebblebrook and Denihan's joint venture obtained a $410 million mortgage loan for the six hotels in 2012. As part of a $10 million project that was completed in 2013, Rottet Studio renovated the guestrooms.

After mayor Michael Bloomberg proposed rezoning East Midtown in 2012, preservationists began advocating for several structures in the neighborhood to be designated as official landmarks. The LPC hosted public hearings in 2013 to determine whether the Benjamin Hotel and four other structures in East Midtown should be designated as New York City landmarks. In mid-2016, the LPC proposed protecting twelve buildings in East Midtown, including the Benjamin Hotel, in advance of proposed changes to the area's zoning. On November 22, 2016, the LPC designated the Benjamin Hotel and ten other nearby buildings as city landmarks.

Denihan and Pebblebrook split up their six hotels in 2016, with Denihan assuming sole ownership of the Benjamin and three other hotels. Denihan subsequently received $320 million in financing for the Benjamin and the other three hotels. Sonesta International Hotels bought all four hotels in April 2022, and the Benjamin Hotel was rebranded as the Benjamin Royal Sonesta New York. To fund the purchase of the hotels, Sonesta borrowed $239 million from Ramsfield Hospitality Finance. The hotel then underwent a renovation, the first phase of which was completed in late 2024 at a cost of $25 million.

== Critical reception and impact ==
Steven Ruttenbaum said in 1986 that "the Beverly is one of Roth's most successful creations ... the Hotel Beverly is one of New York's most romantically styled towers, a rich ornament in the cityscape." The newly completed hotel was depicted in the 1929 painting New York Night, which Georgia O'Keeffe painted from her residence at the nearby Shelton Hotel. Terry Trucco wrote for The New York Times in 1990: "The 60-year-old Beverly is simple and straightforward. The big leather sofas in the large, wood-paneled lobby are more comfortable than chic." The same year, Newsday wrote that the guestrooms "are pleasant; the lobby with its mahogany-paneled walls and leather sofas is relaxing; the staff is friendly; and the concierge volunteers to map out tours of Manhattan, obtain hard-to-get theater tickets and otherwise make one's stay pleasurable."

After the 1999 renovation, The New York Times wrote that the rooms were "stylish and inviting", while Hospitality Design magazine said the Benjamin "pays tribute to an elegant era, a resilient architect, and a much-loved patriarch, while incorporating high-tech amenities that carry it squarely into the new millennium". A critic for The Independent on Sunday wrote in 2003: "The decor is low key but looks expensive: all calming taupes and creams and mahogany furnishings [...] The overall effect is incredibly relaxing." The Globe and Mail wrote the same year that the hotel "retains its art-deco allure with the lobby's sweeping staircase, towering Venetian mirrors and a raised, metal-leaf reception desk." Oyster.com wrote that "the stately architecture and elegant decor of the Benjamin sets it apart from neighboring skyscrapers and bland office buildings in Midtown East". A reviewer for The Telegraph wrote that the hotel "features sophisticated spaces that feel more like upscale apartments" and that the kitchenettes, the bar, and the staff added to the impression that each guestroom was a pied-à-terre. A writer for Town and Country magazine wrote in 2025 that "even the entry-level guest room is spacious by city standards".

When An American Place moved to the Benjamin in 1999, Trucco wrote that "standard dishes, like cedar-planked Atlantic salmon, pot-roasted short ribs and a sinful chocolate pudding topped with whipped cream remain as comforting as ever." When the National Bar and Dining Rooms opened, a writer for New York magazine said that "given its decidedly unhip midtown location inside the 1927 landmarked Benjamin Hotel, it stands out as a gem."

== See also ==
- List of hotels in New York City
- List of New York City Designated Landmarks in Manhattan from 14th to 59th Streets
