= Affinia Hotel Collection =

American hotel chain

- Company type: Private Subsidiary of Denihan Hospitality Group
- Industry: Hospitality
- Founded: 1962 (New York, New York, United States)
- Headquarters: New York, New York, United States
- Key people: • Benjamin J Denihan, Founder • Brooke Denihan Barrett, Chief Executive Officer
- Services: Hotels, Restaurants, and Bars
- Parent: Denihan Hospitality Group
- Website: affinia.com

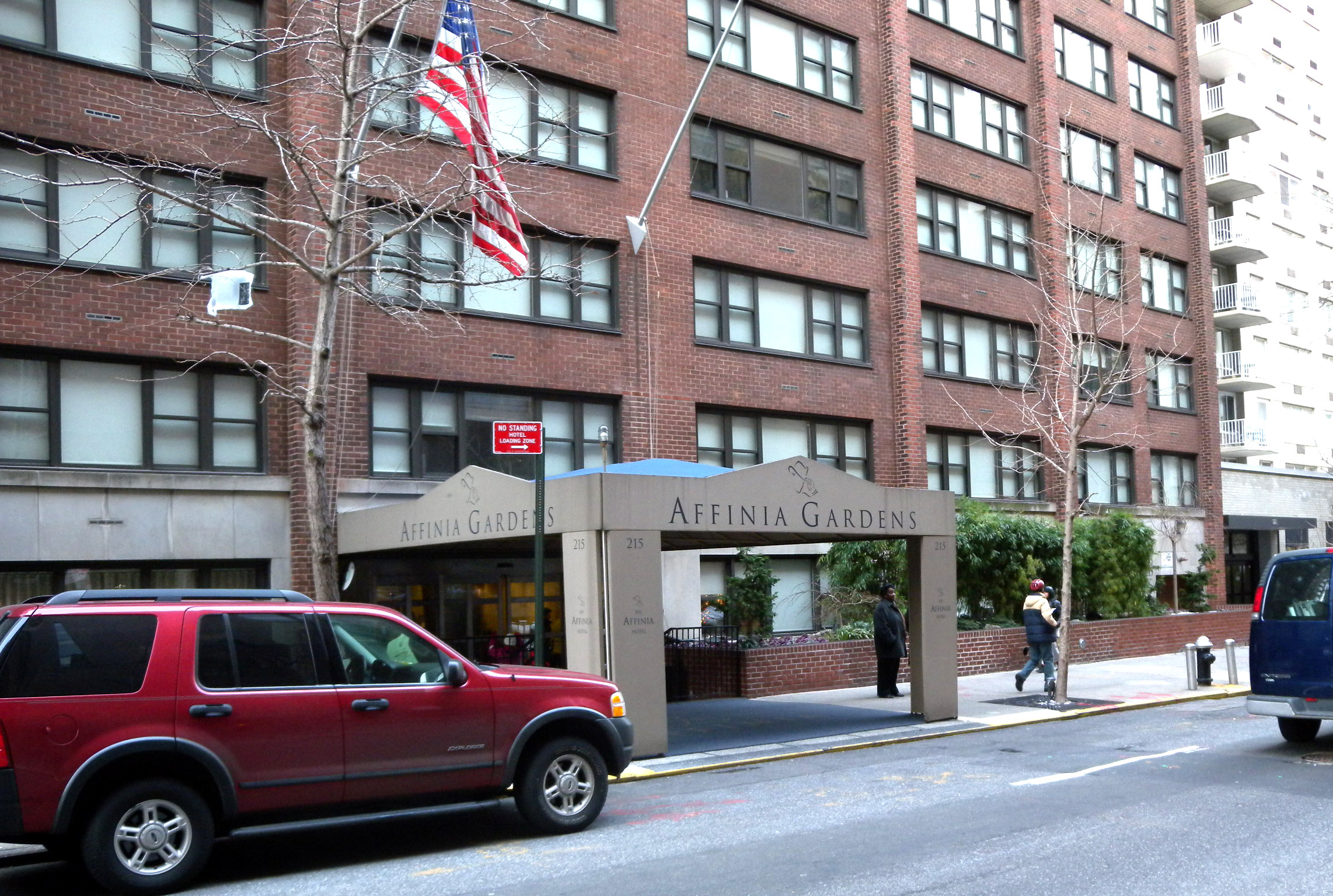
Upper East Side, Manhattan

Affinia Hotel Collection is a chain of boutique hotels offering accommodations in New York City in the United States. Each property has a focus: fitness, tranquility, or location. The corporate headquarters for Affinia Hotel Collection is located in New York City

The chain has a stay customization program called 'My Affinia', which allows guests to personalize their stay prior to arrival. Guests can request items such as yoga mats, guitars, cupcakes, sound pillows, hair diffusers and golf putters.

The first hotel was established in 1962 by Benjamin J. Denihan. Currently the hotel chain is operated by DHG (Denihan Hospitality Group), a privately owned company. The company is a member of an alliance of hotels including Joie De Vivre (California), Thistle Hotels (United Kingdom), Rotana Hotels (Middle East) and First Hotels (Scandinavia).

== Hotels ==
Affinia brand

- Dumont NYC
- Gardens NYC
- Manhattan NYC
- Shelburne NYC

== Restaurants ==
Restaurants at Affinia Hotels

- Rare Bar and Grill at Shelburne NYC, New York

== Bars ==
Bars at Affinia Hotels

- Rare View hay

Lounge at Shelburne NYC, New York
