= Leon Shimkin =

American businessman (1907–1988)

- Born: April 7, 1907; Brooklyn, New York, U.S.
- Died: May 25, 1988 (aged 81); New Rochelle, New York, U.S.
- Occupation: Publisher
- Spouse: Rebecca Shimkin
- Children: 2

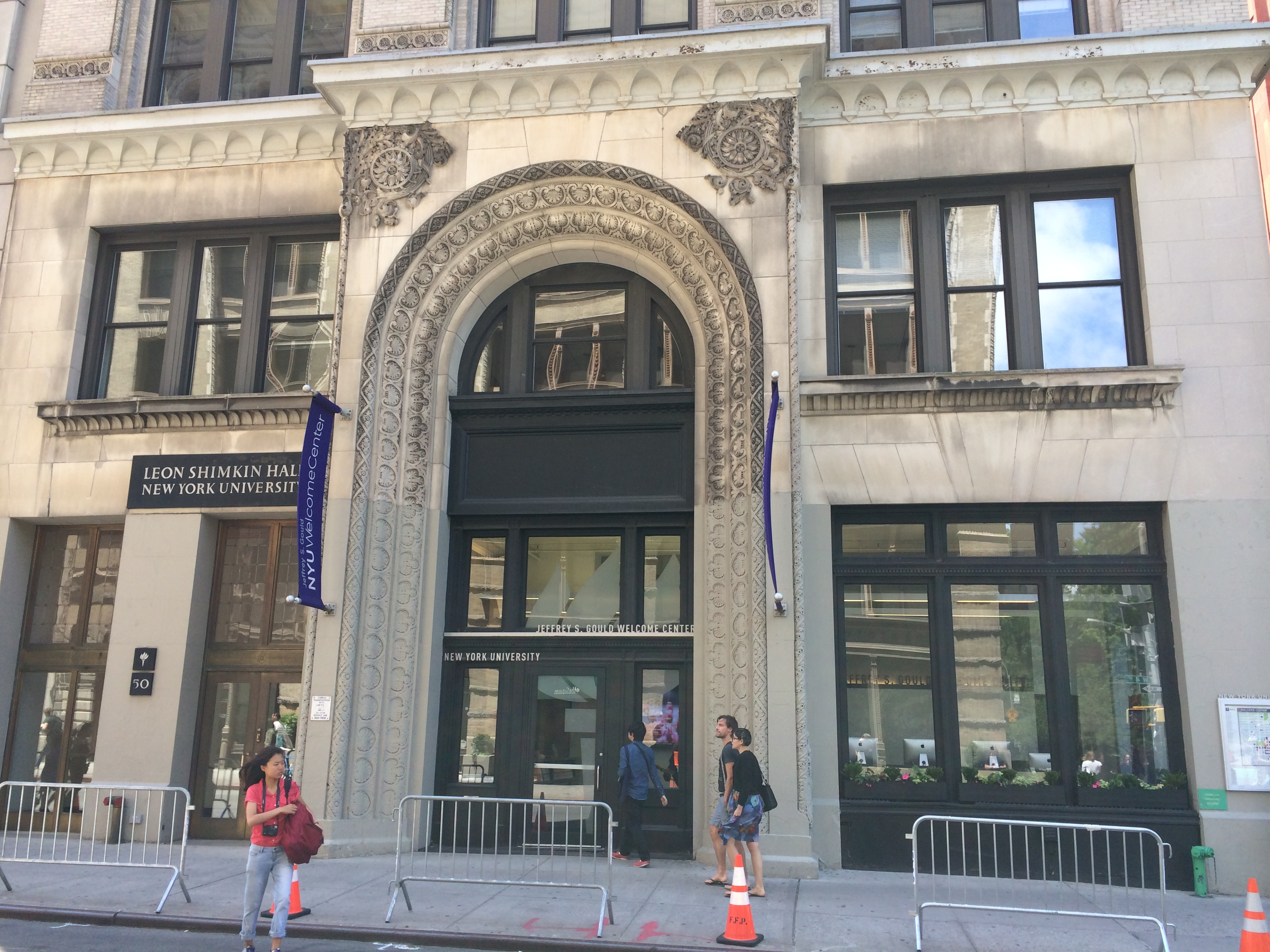
Leon Shimkin Hall at New York University

Leon Shimkin (April 7, 1907 – May 25, 1988) was an American businessman who helped to build Simon & Schuster into a major publishing company. Shimkin was responsible for many self-help bestsellers turning Dale Carnegie's lectures into the bestselling book How to Win Friends and Influence People and J.K. Lasser's tax books. Shimkin co-founded Pocket Books and was a pioneer by distributing mass market paperbacks through newsstands and drugstores. Shimkin became the third partner to Simon & Schuster's Max Schuster and Richard L. Simon and remained as an executive after Simon & Schuster was sold to Field Enterprises, Inc. in 1944. Shimkin rose to become chairman of the board and owner of Simon & Schuster until he sold it to Gulf + Western in 1975.

== Biography ==
=== Early life ===
Leon Shimkin was born in Brooklyn, New York in 1907 to Lithuanian Jewish immigrants. Shimkin had just completed his first year at New York University when he joined Boni & Liveright and then Simon & Schuster as a bookkeeper at age 17. Shimkin continued his studies at New York University in the evenings.

=== Career ===
After joining Simon & Schuster in 1924, Leon rose through the ranks to become the chairman of the board and an owner of the company. Shimkin worked as a bookkeeper and business manager for the original Simon & Schuster partners-- Richard L. Simon and M.Lincoln Schuster. Dick Simon called Shimkin "Our Little Golden Nugget" for his creative approaches to solving their money problems. He made incremental income for the company by selling rights to its books—such as selling rights to Hollywood studios and selling parts of company's crossword-puzzle books to newspapers. He also persuaded the IRS to adopt a new rule for book publishers that allowed them to reinvest book earnings for the benefit of future books.

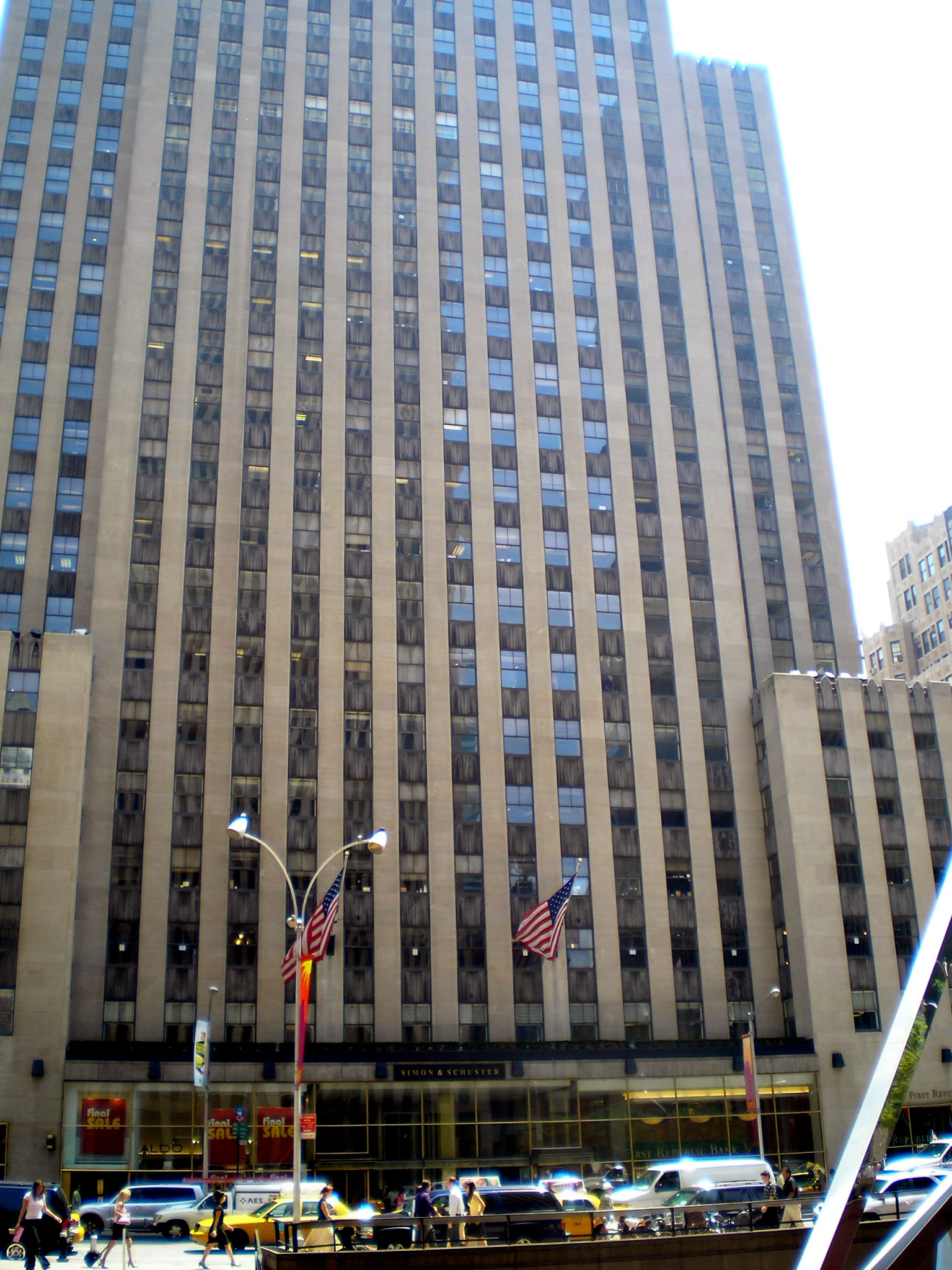
SimonSchusterBuilding

Shimkin was not only a business manager but also came up with ideas for books that went on to become bestsellers especially in areas of self-improvement and self-help. After listening to one of Dale Carnegie's lectures, Shimkin came up with the idea for Dale Carnegie's How to Win Friends and Influence People which would go on to be the biggest bestseller in the Simon & Schuster's early history. Shimkin also persuaded Rabbi Joshua Loth Liebman to write the book Peace of Mind which was a bestseller from 1946 to 1948.

Shimkin was also responsible for J.K. Lasser's tax books. Simon & Schuster was already publishing a guide that was not selling well, and Shimkin called tax expert J.K. Lasser and asked him to write the third edition of Your Income Tax. He told Lasser to "keep the guide simple and readable. Write short sentences and use one-syllable words whenever possible." At its height, the book sold a million copies a year.

Simon & Schuster offered Shimkin a $25,000 bonus for finding the book How to Win Friends, but Shimkin turned it down and asked for a third of the company instead. He became a partner with Simon & Schuster and remained an executive after it was sold to Field Enterprises, Inc. in 1944.

Shimkin co-founded Pocket Books the mass market paperback division with Robert D. de Graff and the other partners of Simon & Schuster kicking off a whole new industry. Shimkin determined the distribution for the new line of paperbacks—instead of distributing through the book channels it was distributed through magazine channels. This meant that paperbacks could be treated like a magazine and sold in newsstands, drugstores, candy stores, bus and railway stations and therefore reach new audiences.

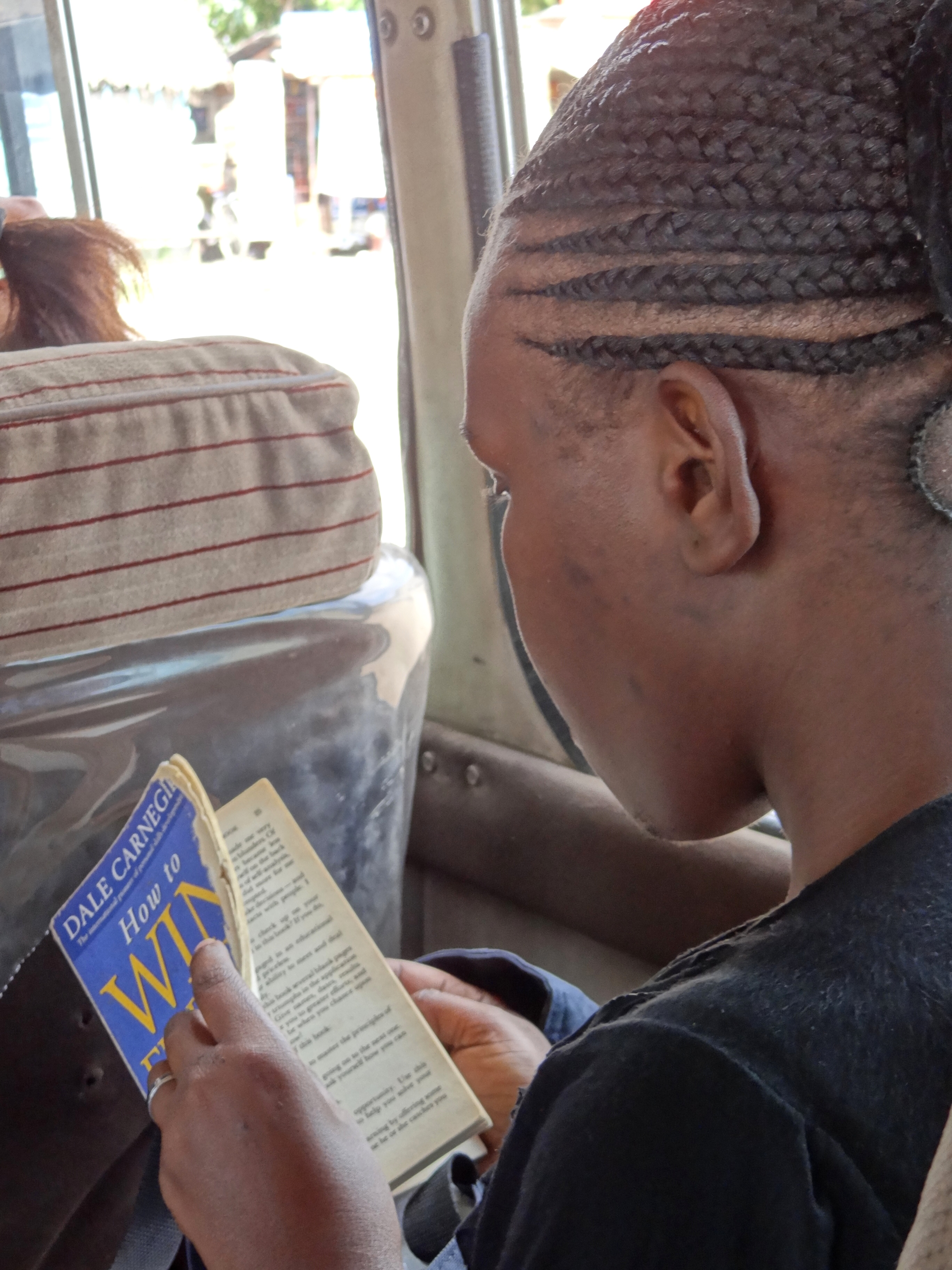
Young African Woman Reads Dale Carnegie - How to Win Friends and Influence People - En route from Bagamoyo to Mwenge - Tanzania (8804130591)

In 1947, Shimkin developed and taught a course on book publishing for New York University's Division of General Education. In 1950 Shimkin was named president of Pocket Books. In 1957 Shimkin along with M. Lincoln Shuster repurchased the company from Field and Shimkin bought Pocket Books on his own. In 1966 he purchased Simon & Schuster from Schuster for $2 Million.

In 1948, Shimkin became business manager for the short-lived New York Star.

In 1961, Shimkin, along with Herbert Alexander, established Trident Press in order to publish hardcover titles for Harold Robbins. According to Michael Korda, this changed the publishing industry as paperback publishers realized they "didn't have to pay second fiddle to the hardcover publishers or bid themselves silly over the rights to "major" fiction from them." It also allowed Shimkin more control and leverage to eventually own all of Simon & Schuster.

Leon Shimkin later sold Simon & Schuster to Gulf+ Western in 1975 but continued to go twice a week to an office he maintained at Simon & Schuster's headquarters on Avenue of Americas until shortly before his death at 81.

=== Marriage and children ===
Leon Shimkin was married to Rebecca Shimkin who died in 1997. The family had a home in Larchmont, New York, a home in Pound Ridge, and an apartment in New York City. Shimkin and his wife Rebecca had two children:

- Emily Shimkin Gindin
- Michael W. Shimkin

== Honors and awards ==
In 1960, the Alumni Association of New York University's School of Commerce presented Leon Shimkin with its Madden Memorial Award for outstanding achievement in business. In 1966, Shimkin pledged $2 million to New York University's capital fund in part to renovate and modernize the school of Commerce building. The building (which Shimkin had studied in) was then renamed as the Leon Shimkin Hall.
