= Denihan Hospitality Group =

Family-owned American hotel and hotel management company based in New York City

Denihan Hospitality Group is a family-owned American hotel and hotel management company based in New York City. Founded in 1963 by Benjamin J. Denihan Jr., the company is now led by siblings and co-CEOs Patrick Denihan and Brooke Barrett. DHG is no longer the owner of the Affinia and The James hotel brands, as well as three independent properties: The Benjamin, The Surrey, and The Carlton. The company had plans to open the James Los Angeles-West Hollywood hotel in 2016. Since 2016, they've sold off all of their properties.

The Surrey was bought from Denihan Hospitality Group. The hotel was purchased by the Reuben Brothers in December 2020.

Denihan Hospitality Group acquired the Beverly in 1997 and renovated it over the next two years, renaming the hotel the Benjamin. The hotel was again renovated between 2010 and 2013, and Sonesta International Hotels acquired the Benjamin in 2021.

Denihan Hospitality Group no longer holds any ownership stake in the hotel formerly known as the Carlton Hotel, now operating as Hotel Seville NoMad.

In June 2020, GFI Capital Resources Group acquired a 61% majority stake in the hotel, with Denihan retaining a minority share at that time. However, in April 2025, Hyatt Hotels Corporation acquired the hotel and rebranded it as Hotel Seville NoMad. This acquisition marked the end of Denihan's involvement with the property.

== History ==
In 1927, Irish immigrant Benjamin Denihan, who had arrived in the United States several years earlier, opened a dry cleaning storefront in Manhattan. In just over a decade, the business had become one of the largest and most exclusive dry cleaners in New York. Ownership eventually passed to Denihan's son, Benjamin J. 'Bud' Denihan Jr.

During World War II, as the Denihan men were sent off to fight, the women in the family took over the business and were able to keep it afloat by obtaining contracts for cleaning military uniforms.

In the 1950s, Bud Denihan made his first venture into the real estate market, acquiring several residential apartment buildings in New York. A few of his children, including Patrick, Brooke, Donald, Laurence, and Maureen began working in the new business.

In 1963, the family's first hotel, Lyden Gardens, opened on the site of their former dry cleaning plant on the Upper East Side of Manhattan. The innovative property debuted as the first-ever all-suite hotel. Today, it is the Affinia Gardens Hotel.

Over the next two decades, the company, initially operating under the name Manhattan East Apartment Hotels before becoming Manhattan East Suite Hotels, built up its portfolio under Bud's leadership. Upon his death in 1986, ownership passed to six family members: four of Bud's children, a son-in-law, and a nephew.

In 1997, the Denihans acquired the Beverly Hotel on 50th Street and Lexington Avenue in New York. Two years later, after a massive renovation, it reopened as The Benjamin. Named for the company's founder, The Benjamin was Manhattan East Suite Hotels' first luxury independent hotel as well as New York's first eco-friendly property.

In 2003, Manhattan East Suite Hotels rebranded as Affinia Hospitality Group. The name is derived from the word 'affinity.' Five of the company's nine New York properties were then rebranded as Affinia Hotels. They are Affinia Dumont, Affinia 50, Affinia Manhattan, Affinia Shelburne, and Affinia Gardens.

Three years later, in 2006, the six owners and managing directors decided to sell the business. Bud Denihan's two eldest children, Benjamin 'Patrick' Denihan and Brooke Denihan Barrett, purchased the management company and its core assets in Manhattan, which consisted of the five Affinia properties and The Benjamin, thus becoming the sole owners and co-CEOs. Later that year, they launched a $532 million recapitalization program to expand their portfolio while diversifying their customer offerings. They also gave the company its current moniker, Denihan Hospitality Group.

Also during that year, DHG acquired The James brand, with The James Chicago as its flagship. Included in the purchase is the David Burke Primehouse, located in The James Chicago.

In 2007, Denihan was awarded the management contract for the former Holiday Inn on the Hill by LaSalle Hotel Properties in Washington, D.C. This property, which marked the company's first third-party hotel management deal, eventually became The Liaison Capitol Hill, an Affinia Hotel. It opened in 2008 after a $12 million renovation. Art Smith, Oprah Winfrey's former private chef and a two-time James Beard Award winner, partnered with Affinia as the chef of The Liaison's new Art & Soul restaurant.

In May 2008, Affinia launched their MyAffinia program, the industry's first service that allows guests to customize their stays in advance of check-in with a variety of amenities, most of which are complimentary. Among the choices are a yoga mat, a golf putter, cupcakes, universal chargers, gel eye masks, and much more. That same year, Denihan began a $60 million renovation of The Surrey, a historic residential property less than a block from Central Park on Manhattan's Upper East Side. It would reopen in 2009.

Denihan Hospitality Group became the first hotel company to place a direct feed from their Affinia website on TripAdvisor in 2008.

In July 2010, Affinia Hotels became a charter member of Stash Hotel Rewards, a new customer loyalty program. Later that year, in September, Denihan launched The James New York in Soho. In November, the company was awarded the management contract for the Royal Palm hotel in Miami, Florida. This property, which is currently undergoing a $43 million renovation, will reopen in October 2012 as The James Royal Palm.

Affinia Hotels announced a new service initiative in September 2011 called Tender Loving Comfort (TLC). The program teaches Affinia associates a variety of skills, including how to read guests' body language to better anticipate their needs and improve a connection with them. Furthermore, guests can join the TLC VIP program, which features a variety of perks, including a VIP room upgrade.

In January 2012, Denihan promoted former CFO David Duncan to president of the company, marking the first time a non-family member has held the position.

That March, DHG signed management contracts with Ark Partners for two additional boutique hotels in Manhattan: The Mansfield in Midtown and The Franklin on the Upper East Side, bringing the company's New York City portfolio to 11 properties.

In April 2012, Denihan announced that they hoped to expand to the West Coast, opening a development office in San Francisco.

== Family ==
Donald Denihan married Deirdre Barrett in 1989, linking the Denihan family with the Barrett family of New York.
