= Jacob K. Lasser =

American accountant

Jacob Kay Lasser (October 6, 1896–May 11, 1954) was an American accountant who wrote the best selling book Your Income Tax. Max Schuster, Lasser's publisher, said "Lasser is to taxation what Einstein is to relativity."

Lasser, the son of immigrants from Austria–Hungary, was born in Newark, New Jersey. He studied accounting at New York University from 1915 to 1917. Lasser served in the United States Navy in World War I.

Lasser received a bachelor of science in mechanical engineering in 1920 and a master of science in industrial engineering in 1923, both from Pennsylvania State University. Lasser worked initially at the accounting firm of Touche, Niven & Company. In 1923, he opened his own firm, J.K. Lasser & Company, at 1440 Broadway in Manhattan, operating it until his death. He lived in South Orange, New Jersey, and at the Hotel Beverly in Manhattan.

In 1939, he published the first edition of his guide to United States federal income tax laws; it sold 23,000 copies. Leon Shimkin brought the book to Simon & Schuster, which became one of the company's most profitable titles. Lasser had done tax work for Simon & Schuster. Besides Simon & Schuster, Lasser's firm had over 250 clients in the publishing industry. The 1946 edition of Your Income Tax sold seven million copies. The book was a perennial best-seller for decades and is still published annually. From 1943 until his death, he wrote a monthly column on taxation in the Journal of Accountancy.

He wrote several books on personal finance with Sylvia Porter. Walter Lord, who was a tax lawyer before he wrote a best-seller on the Titanic, assisted Lasser in writing his tax manuals.

In 1953, Lasser bought WICH, a radio station in Norwich, Connecticut.

Lasser died in Manhattan in 1954. His estate was the subject of a New York appellate decision regarding ownership of stock in his company, Business Reports, Inc. In re Lasser, 128 A.D. 2d 531 (N.Y. App. Div. March 2, 1987). The Lasser income tax books are now published by John Wiley & Sons. His accounting firm merged with Touche Ross in 1977.

His wife, Therese Lasser (1904–1979), founded a group to help breast cancer survivors. Lasser had one son, Donald Judd Lasser, and one daughter, Barbara Lasser, who married Lee Edmund Gray.
