= 569 Lexington Avenue =

Building in Manhattan, New York

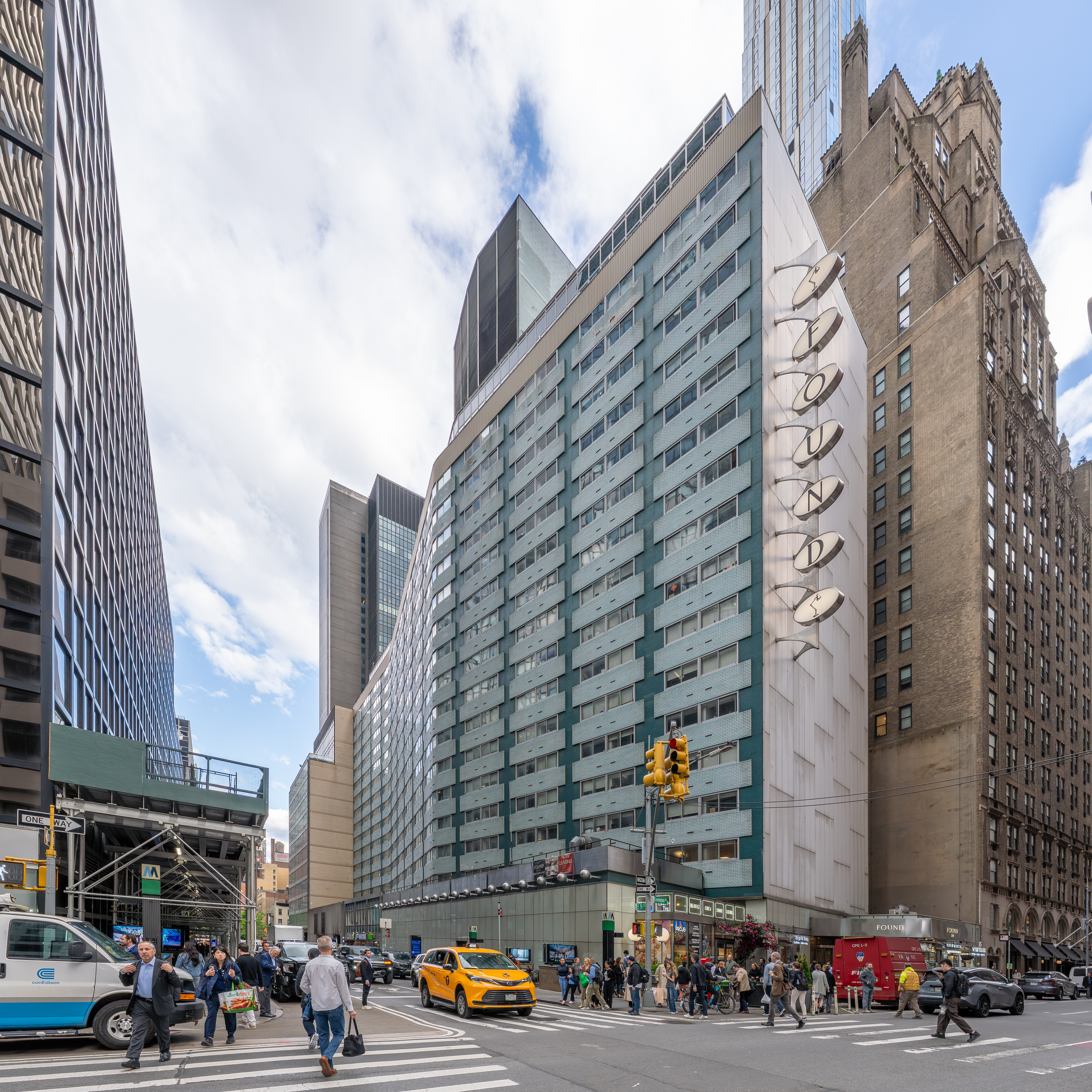
- 569 Lexington Avenue as seen from across Lexington Avenue and 51st Street
- Interactive map of the 569 Lexington Avenue area
- Former names: Summit Hotel; Loew's New York Hotel; Metropolitan Hotel; DoubleTree Metropolitan Hotel; DoubleTree by Hilton Hotel Metropolitan New York City

General information
- Architectural style: Miami Modern
- Location: 569 Lexington Avenue, Manhattan, New York, US
- Coordinates: 40°45′24″N 73°58′17″W
- Opening: August 1, 1961
- Owner: Hawkins Way Capital

Technical details
- Floor count: 20

Design and construction
- Architect: Morris Lapidus
- Architecture firm: Harle & Liebman
- Developer: Loews Hotels

Other information
- Number of rooms: 800
- Parking: 250 spots

New York City Landmark
- Designated: May 17, 2005
- Reference no.: 2176
- Designated entity: Facade

569 Lexington Avenue (originally the Summit Hotel; formerly the Loews New York Hotel, Metropolitan Hotel, and DoubleTree by Hilton Hotel Metropolitan New York City) is a dormitory building and former hotel in the East Midtown neighborhood of Manhattan in New York City. Designed by architect Morris Lapidus in the Miami Modern style, in association with the firm of Harle & Liebman, the building occupies the southeastern corner of Lexington Avenue and 51st Street. As of 2024, the building is owned by Hawkins Way Capital which opened Found Study, a dormitory, on the site in 2022. The hotel building is a New York City designated landmark.

The building is 20 stories tall and stretches from west to east, with an S-shaped massing bent at two places. The hotel has a facade made of marble, turquoise glazed brick, and dark-green tile. There are storefronts along both 51st Street and Lexington Avenue. Above 569 Lexington Avenue's main entrance on Lexington Avenue is a vertical sign, consisting of ovals that originally spelled out the hotel's name. The lowest stories contained the lobby, three Latin American-themed dining areas, various shops, and meeting rooms. When the Summit Hotel opened, it contained 800 guest rooms, including 200 rooms with balconies on the upper stories.

The site was previously occupied by the Loew's Lexington Theatre, which was built in the 1910s. Loew's Theatres announced plans to replace the theater in early 1960, and a groundbreaking ceremony for the hotel took place on June 21, 1960. The Summit Hotel opened on August 1, 1961, and was Manhattan's first new hotel for short-term tenants in thirty years. When the Summit opened, its facade and interior were almost universally criticized, though the building's shape had a mixed reception. Over the years, the hotel has been renovated several times. The Summit was renamed the Loews New York Hotel in 1991 and became the Metropolitan Hotel in 2000. Loews sold the hotel in 2003 to a joint venture, which rebranded it in 2005 as part of the DoubleTree chain. RLJ Lodging Trust acquired the DoubleTree Metropolitan in 2011. The hotel was closed indefinitely in 2020 due to the COVID-19 pandemic in New York City and was sold in 2022 to Hawkins Way Capital. A dormitory, Found Study, opened at the building in late 2022.

== Site ==
569 Lexington Avenue is on the southeastern corner of Lexington Avenue and 51st Street, in the Midtown Manhattan neighborhood of New York City. It sits on the northwestern portion of a city block bounded by Lexington Avenue to the west, 50th Street to the south, Third Avenue to the east, and 51st Street to the north. 569 Lexington Avenue occupies a nearly rectangular land lot with an area of 32,273 ft^{2} (2,998.3 m^{2}). The site has a frontage of 100 ft (30 m) on Lexington Avenue and 320 ft (98 m) on 51st Street.

The Benjamin Hotel is to the south on the same block, and St. Bartholomew's Episcopal Church and the General Electric Building are to the west. 569 Lexington Avenue is also near the Waldorf Astoria New York to the southwest and 345 Park Avenue to the northwest. Entrances to the New York City Subway's Lexington Avenue/51st Street station, served by the 6, <6>, E, F, and <F> trains, are adjacent to the north side of the building.

The site of the Summit Hotel was previously occupied by two buildings. Much of the site was occupied by the Loew's Lexington Theater, built in the early 1910s by Oscar Hammerstein I. (Note: Sources disagree on whether the theater was built in 1910, 1913, or 1915.) It was subsequently acquired by Marcus Loew of the Loews Corporation. The theater wrapped around a smaller structure at the corner of Lexington Avenue and 51st Street, which measured 100 by 50 ft (30 by 15 m). Before the theater was built, the site was occupied by the Nursery and Child's Hospital in the 19th century.

== Architecture ==
569 Lexington Avenue was designed by Morris Lapidus and the firm of Harle & Liebman as the Summit Hotel. The latter firm was composed of interior designers Abby Harle and Harold Liebman, whom Lapidus worked with until the mid-1960s. Lapidus and the Harle & Liebman firm both had separate offices in New York City and in Miami Beach, Florida. When the Summit opened in 1961, it was Lapidus's first New York City hotel, as well as Manhattan's first new hotel in three decades. It was designed in a Miami Modern style, similar to his earlier Fontainebleau Miami Beach and Eden Roc Miami Beach Hotel.

=== Form and facade ===
The base occupies the whole lot and is one story tall at its eastern end. Since the site slopes downward to the east, the eastern part of the base is taller than the western portion. The main section of the hotel rises 15 stories and stretches from west to east, with an S-shaped massing. Lapidus wanted to maximize space in the hotel; he reasoned that a straight line was the minimum distance between two points, so he increased the hotel's length by bending its massing. Whereas a conventional hotel on the site would have been restricted to 500 rooms, Lapidus was able to fit 800 rooms in the Summit. At the time of the Summit Hotel's construction, other "unconventional" buildings like the Solomon R. Guggenheim Museum, TWA Flight Center, and Begrisch Hall were being built in New York City. The upper stories are freestanding on three elevations, abutting only the Girl Scouts Building to the east.

569 Lexington Avenue has a facade made of marble, glazed brick, and tile. To distinguish the hotel from other nearby buildings, Lapidus used a color palette of dark-green mosaic tile and turquoise brick. Lapidus said he was inspired by the green-blue color of the McGraw Hill Building at 330 West 42nd Street, designed by Raymond Hood. The west and east elevations were entirely windowless.

==== Base ====
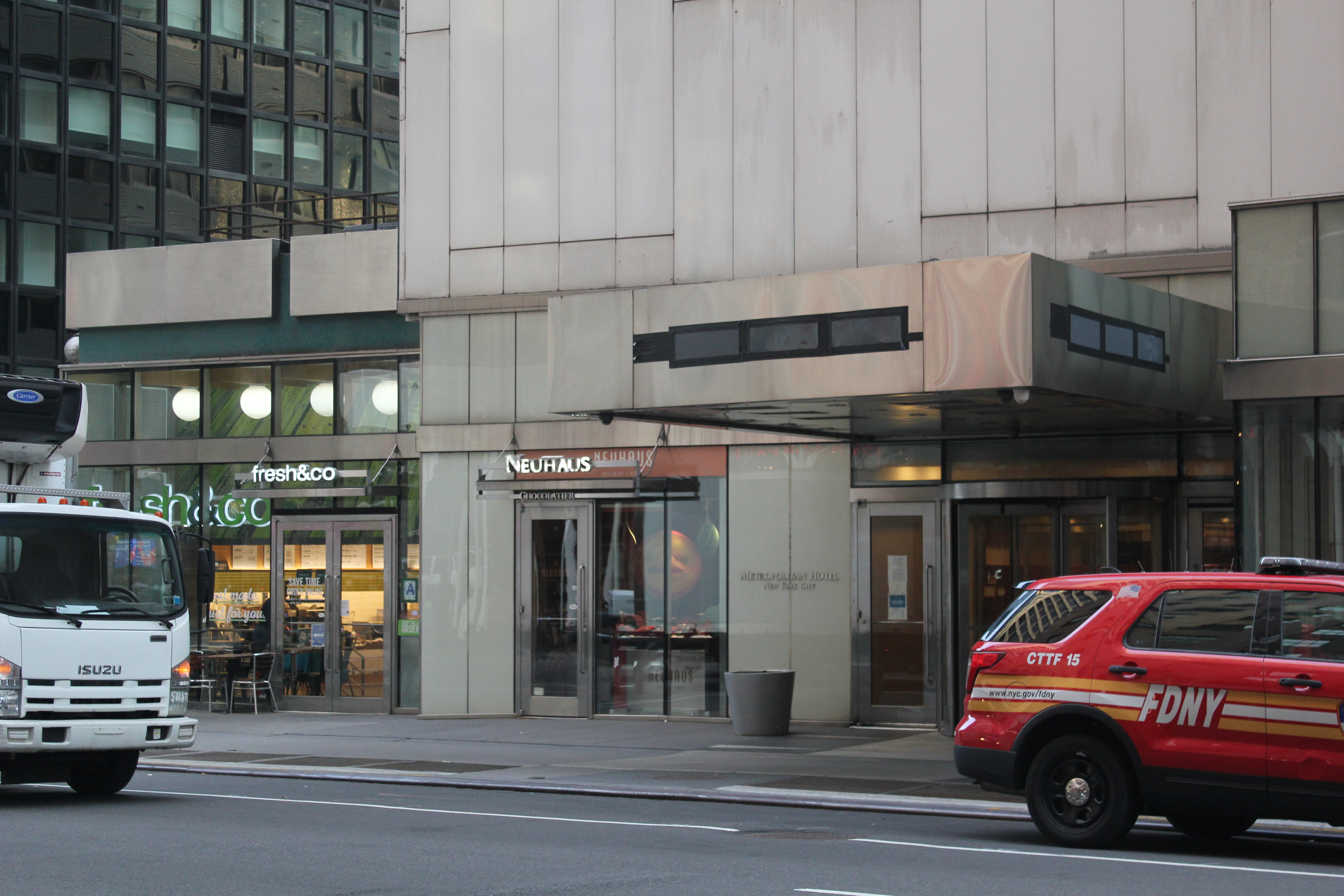
The main entrance on Lexington Avenue

569 Lexington Avenue's main entrance is on the Lexington Avenue elevation and is oriented slightly away from 51st Street. It consists of a set of metal doors on either side of a revolving door. In front of the entrance is a marquee of stainless steel with recessed lighting. Originally, there was a small plaza with light-hued terrazzo tiles in front of the main entrance. A pair of stainless-steel columns flanked the entrance and ascended to the third story.

The entrance was flanked by two restaurants: El Gaucho to the south and Casa Del Cafe to the north. The facade of El Gaucho was depressed beneath the main entrance and contained "molded stone-like lattice work" with small stained-glass inlays. The entrance to Casa Del Cafe was through a pair of stainless pillars. By the early 2000s, these had been replaced with storefronts, which take up the space formerly occupied by the plaza. Next to the northern storefront is a raised planter with globe-shaped lamps, which dates from the original design. The planter originally contained foliage that resembled palm plants in Miami Beach, Florida. The southern storefront was redesigned in 1990 with a dark-red metal facade, glass brick windows, and a curved corner.

Along the 51st Street elevation, the western half of the base is windowless. This elevation originally contained a facade of green mosaic tiles and precast concrete slabs, but this was replaced in 2005 with light-green rectangular glass tiles. There is a recessed service entrance in the middle of the glass-tiled section of the base. A small strip of green mosaic tile remains extant above the glass tiles; it contains projecting globe-shaped lamps made of aluminum. There are steel planters above the lamps. The central section of the base on 51st Street contains three recessed storefronts at ground level. Due to the slope of the site, the first story is above the storefronts; steel piers divide this section vertically into three bays. Each bay has four windows, each with green-glass transoms above and below. The easternmost section of the base on 51st Street is clad with concrete panels and contains a loading dock and a parking garage entrance. Above the parking-garage entrance are two vertical metal signs, each with neon letters and arrows advertising the garage.

==== Upper stories ====
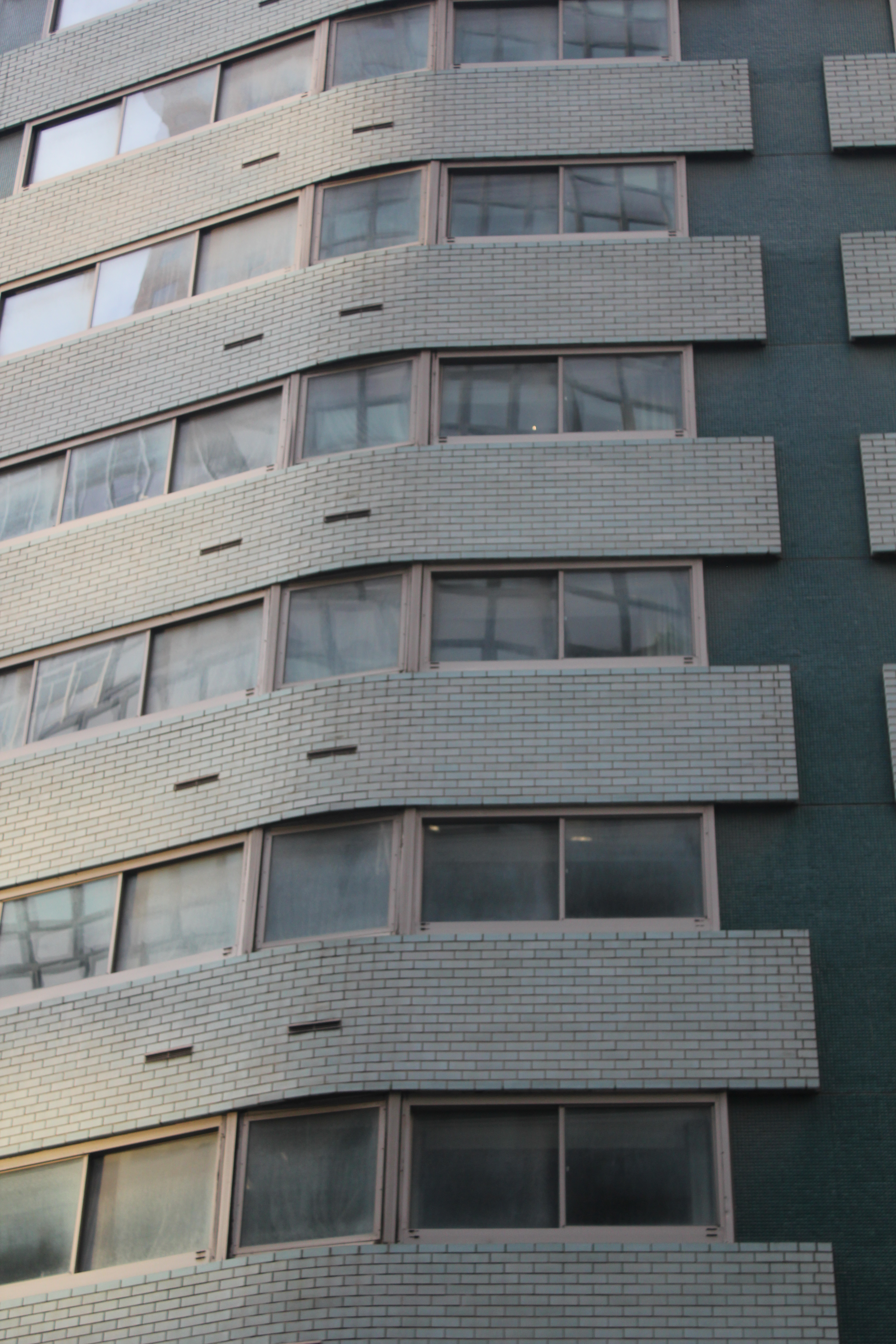
Facade detail

The massing of the S-shaped upper stories is divided into three sections. The eastern section is parallel to the Manhattan street grid; the central section is oriented northwest, relative to the street grid; and the western section is oriented southwest, relative to the street grid. The north and south elevations are divided vertically into several bays. The main portion of the facade contains a background of dark green mosaic tiles. The windows on different stories are separated by slightly projecting rectangular spandrel panels of light-green brick, each with two vents. Each window is shared by two hotel rooms and is divided into two sections. Above the top floor of the main section are beige aluminum panels.

Above the main entrance on Lexington Avenue, the facade was originally a blank wall of Vermont marble, without any windows. On the 7th to 13th floors, near the north end of the west elevation, is an illuminated sign measuring around 70 ft (21 m) tall. The sign was visible from all directions except the east. It contains seven oval disks in a vertical arrangement, as well as triangular supports between each disk. These disks each measure 8.5 ft (2.6 m) across and originally spelled out the word "Summit". Each oval disk could accommodate a single letter. The ovals were rearranged to spell "Loews" when the hotel became the Loews New York in the 1990s. After the hotel was renamed the "Metropolitan" in 2000, the letters of the hotel's name were placed in front of the triangular brackets and ovals, rather than directly onto the ovals.

The roof of the building contains a penthouse, which is set back from the roof, as well as a mechanical space in the middle of the block. The penthouse has a green-glass facade and is three stories tall. It was divided into two sections with their own patios.

=== Features ===
The Summit Hotel was New York City's first hotel with a superstructure made of reinforced concrete. The use of a concrete frame obviated the need for steel ceiling beams, thus allowing each room to have higher ceilings and more flexible room arrangements. Additionally, the concrete frame was cheaper than a steel frame, and a concrete frame also provided better sound insulation. According to Lapidus, his previous projects had all used reinforced concrete, and he did not intend to use steel. The hotel was served by four passenger elevators and two service lifts.

The hotel has a five-story parking garage with 250 spots. Originally, there were supposed to be 225 or 300 spaces in the parking garage. Three of the five levels of parking are below the street. When the Summit Hotel opened, it also had a fleet of "foreign cars" for international travelers, including several right-hand drive vehicles (the opposite configuration from American vehicles, which are left-hand drive and follow right-hand traffic).

==== Lobby ====
Lapidus had to fit a reception desk, three dining areas, a men's apparel shop, a barber shop, and meeting rooms within the lowest stories. The hotel's "public rooms" included three Latin American restaurants: the Gaucho Steak House, the Colombian Coffee House, and the Carioca Cocktail Lounge. All were designed in a whimsical style that, according to Lapidus, "created an image of Latin America that doesn't actually exist". The Gaucho Steak House was designed with metal light fixtures shaped like steer skulls; walls with gold naugahyde; and ceiling beams with animal motifs. The Carioca Lounge had a rosewood bar and a Venetian glass wall, as well as redwood walls, calf-hide wall panels, and wooden curtains. Meanwhile, the coffee shop had "pre-Columbian" wall decorations, consisting of cast stone panels designed by James Seeman and a sculpture with "machine parts" designed by Jordan Stechel. The coffee shop was decorated in a pink, purple, mauve, and orange color scheme. In addition, the Summit Hotel contained an event space called the Embassy Ballroom.

Lapidus designed the lobby as a multicolored space, drawing attention away from the lobby's small size. When the Summit Hotel was built, the ceiling was covered in gold mosaics, while the walls and columns were clad in Indian rosewood with gold strips. The reception desk had a mosaic tile design. The walls contained blue-green fabric panels and ornate wreath-shaped lighting sconces. The lobby's design initially included white terrazzo floors with inlaid blue-green tiles, which were covered by blue-green rugs. Transparent plastic chairs complemented the design. Within three months of the hotel's opening, the Summit Hotel's management replaced the original furnishings with a brown-gold rug and upholstered chairs. The lobby was redecorated in the Art Deco style in the 1990s, then remodeled yet again in the early 2000s.

An open staircase led from the lobby to the restrooms and ballroom; it was decorated with a mural that, according to Lapidus, was an "abstraction" intended to evoke the feeling of approaching a summit. Lapidus also installed bright lighting to lead people to the elevators; the lights were so intense that they had their own air-conditioning unit. The elevator doors were decorated with porcelain enamel designs in a blue, green, turquoise, purple, and black color palette.

==== Rooms ====
When the Summit Hotel opened, it contained 800 guest rooms, including 200 rooms with balconies on the upper stories. Each room had a separate pantry with a refrigerator/bar and a washbasin, physically separated from the rest of the room. On one wall was a combination bureau/desk with a mirror and drawers, as well as a bench that could accommodate several guests at once. Adjacent to the bureau/desk were metal studs that could hold suitcases. All rooms had movable television sets as well as electric shoe polishers. Rooms also had two telephones: one each in the bathroom and bedroom. The ceilings measured 8 ft (2.4 m) high, while the floors were carpeted throughout.

There were five suites on the top three stories: the Continental, Presidential, Sunset, Summit, and Villa d'Este. Each suite had full-height windows as well as its own terrace with views of the city.

== History ==
The completion of the underground Grand Central Terminal in 1913 resulted in the rapid development of Terminal City, the area around Grand Central, as well as a corresponding increase in real-estate prices. Among these were office buildings such as the Chanin Building, Bowery Savings Bank Building, and New York Central Building. In addition, there was a large concentration of hotels on Lexington Avenue, including the Lexington, Shelton, Belmont Plaza, Barclay, Waldorf Astoria, and Beverly from south to north. The hotels accommodated crowds who visited the Grand Central Palace exhibition hall and, after the 1950s, the headquarters of the United Nations.

=== Development ===
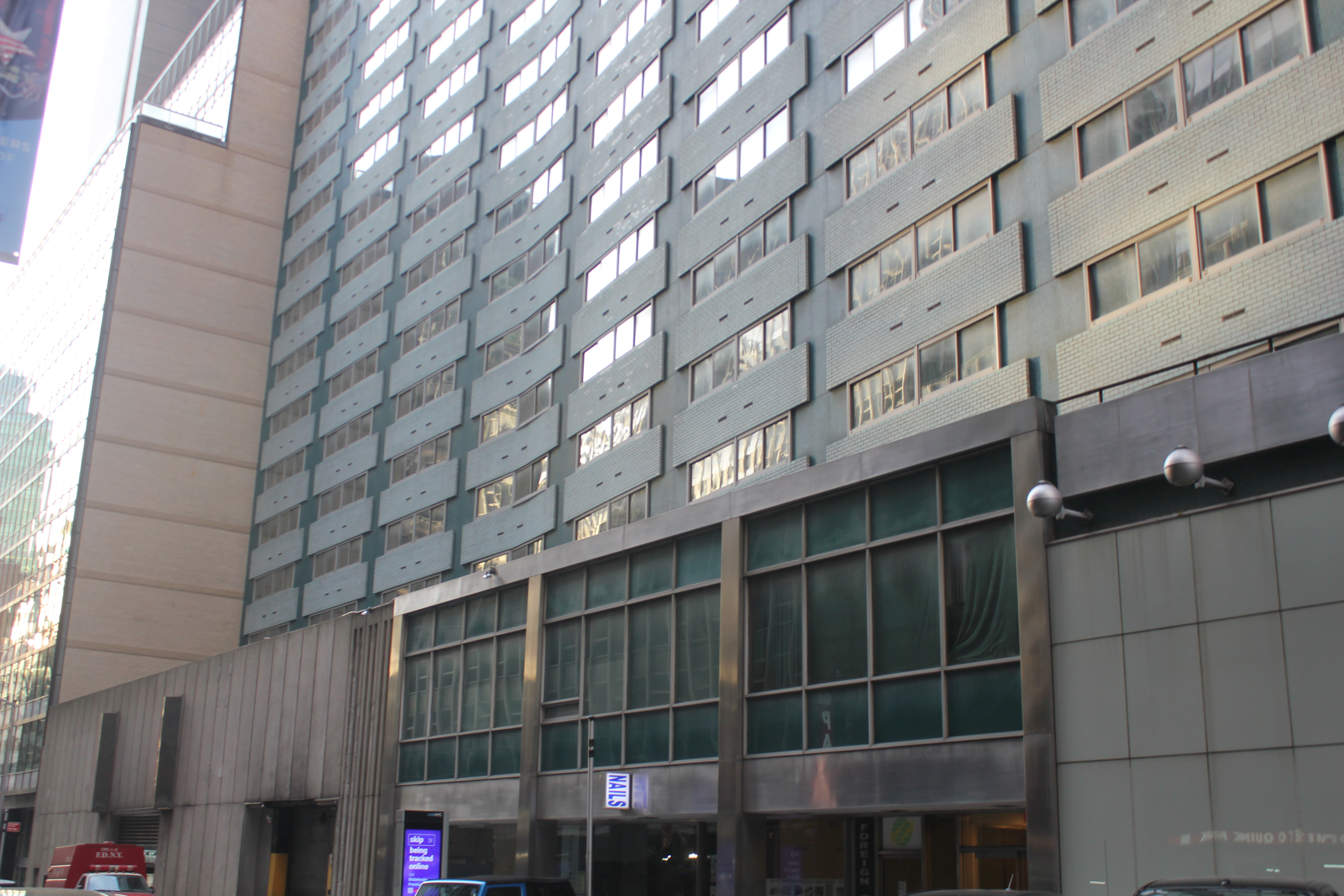
View of the base on 51st Street

In January 1960, the board of directors of Loew's Theatres authorized a preliminary report to determine the feasibility of replacing the Loew's Lexington Theatre. The study was commissioned by Laurence Tisch, Loew's largest shareholder. The plans had originally called for a hotel with an attached movie theater. The movie theater was eliminated from the hotel plans because Loew's wanted to build a separate theater nearby. The Loew's Lexington closed on April 3, 1960, and was demolished immediately afterward. Loew's announced it would erect an 800-room hotel on the site, designed by Morris Lapidus and Kornblath, Harle & Liebman. The hotel would be the first to be developed by Loew's Theatres, and Tisch believed it would have a "tremendous" net return. The Diesel Construction Company was hired as the hotel's general contractor. The architects filed construction plans for the hotel sometime in early 1960. The plans called for an S-shaped structure with 800 guest rooms, four dining rooms, and a 150-space garage.

The hotel's groundbreaking ceremony took place on June 21, 1960. At the time, the hotel was known as the Americana; it would be the first large hotel in Manhattan built after World War II. (Note: The proposed Zeckendorf Hotel on Sixth Avenue between 51st and 52nd Street was originally supposed to be the first post-World War II hotel in Manhattan. However, plans for that hotel were ultimately canceled.) By August 1960, the hotel was known as the Americana East, as the "Americana" name was being used for another project on Seventh Avenue (now the Sheraton New York Times Square Hotel). To avoid confusion with the hotel on Seventh Avenue, the Lexington Avenue hotel was renamed the Summit in November 1960. At that point, the concrete superstructure had begun to rise above ground level. The builders planned to erect two stories per week. According to the structural engineers, the Summit was built "at the fastest rate ever achieved for a reinforced concrete building". In February 1961, a New York state judge placed an injunction that limited construction from 7 a.m. to 6 p.m. on weekdays. At that point, the superstructure had risen to 19 stories. During this time, Loew's also built mockups of the hotel's rooms in the basement of the Capitol Theatre.

Loew's hired Claudius C. Philippe, head of sales and catering at the Waldorf Astoria, as the Summit's first executive vice president in early 1961. Robert Huyot was also hired as a managing director. Summit Hotel officials interviewed 4,000 people for about 650 staff positions. Hotel officials wanted to attract an international clientele, and one official said it was "absolutely necessary" that staff members be able to speak several languages. Room clerks and bellhops were expected to be proficient in at least one foreign language, although doormen were exempt from this rule. In addition, the hotel installed signs in four languages, and the lobby was stocked with magazines and newspapers in multiple languages. The Summit spent $200,000 to run advertisements in movie theaters, on radio stations, and in European and South American newspapers. Loew's sent out tens of thousands of brochures and displayed ads on its movie screens. By the time the Summit Hotel opened, its staff could speak 16 languages, "including two dialects of Chinese, Hebrew, and Swahili". In addition to the multilingual staff, there was a European-style concierge service.

=== Loew's operation ===
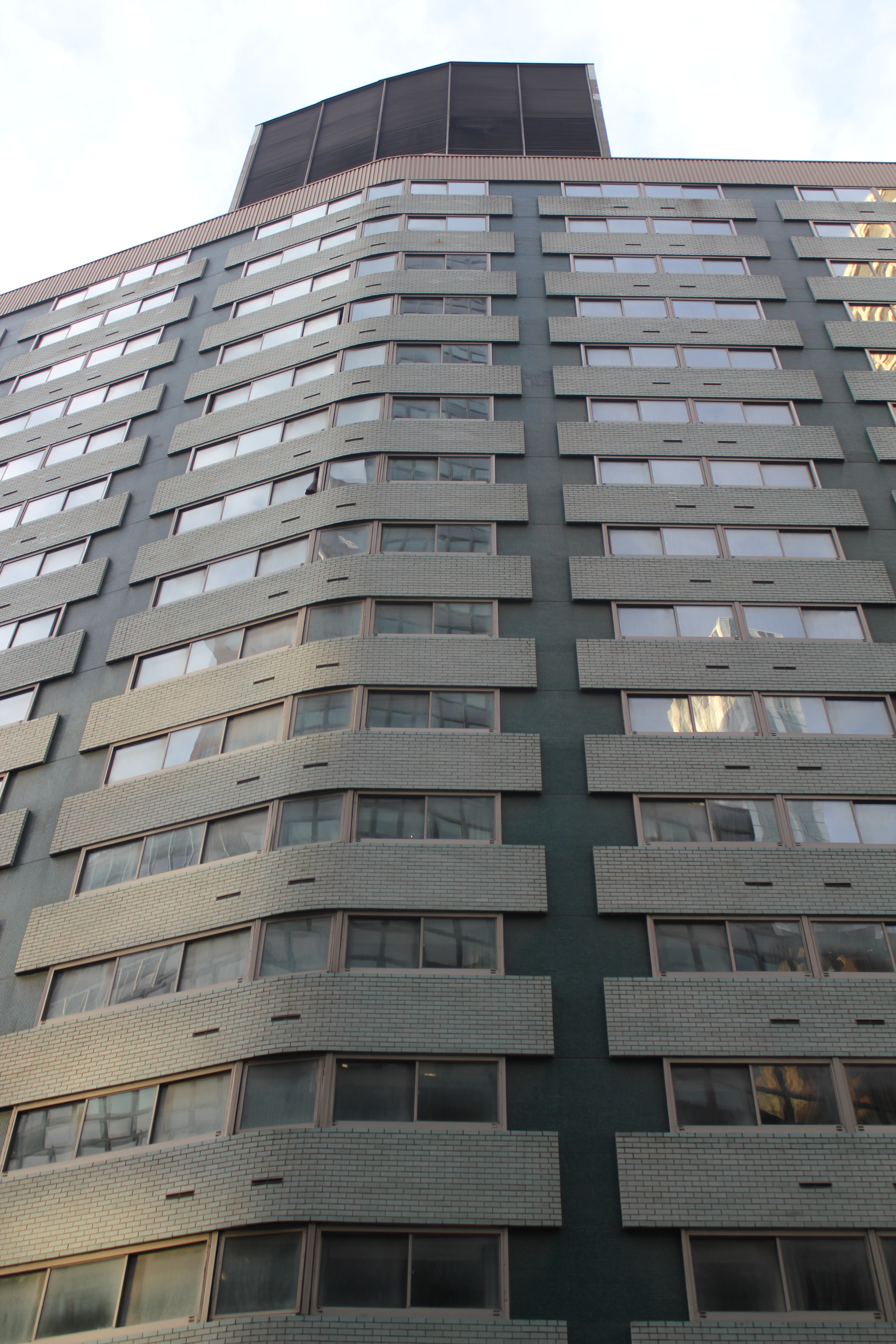
Bent slab on 51st Street

Several officials attended a dinner on July 31, 1961, to celebrate the hotel's completion. The Summit Hotel opened the next day, August 1, with a ceremony attended by Filipino diplomat Carlos P. Romulo, deputy mayor Paul R. Screvane, and Commerce and Industry Department official Robert W. Watt. It was the first hotel operated by Loew's Theatres, as well as Manhattan's first new short-term hotel since the Waldorf Astoria opened in 1931. (Note: This excludes Carlton House on Madison Avenue and 61st Street, which opened in 1951 as an apartment hotel and did not accommodate short-term visitors.) The hotel had cost $25 million to construct, and its nightly room rates ranged from $15 to $185. The most expensive unit in the hotel was the Presidential Suite, of which comedian Groucho Marx was the first guest. Though the hospitality industry in New York City had reportedly reached a 20-year low in 1960, the Tisch brothers expressed confidence that the Summit would attract guests with its unconventional design and multilingual staff.

In September 1961, the hotel's managers obtained a $8 million mortgage loan from Massachusetts Mutual. Many observers were critical of the Summit's flashy design, prompting the Summit's management to redesign the lobby in a more muted style the next month. The hotel also applied for a cabaret license that November, having received a $25 fine for offering unlicensed musical entertainment at its restaurants for four months. Within a year of the Summit's opening, foreign visitors made up 12 percent of its customers. During the 1965 New York City mayoral election, the Summit Hotel housed the headquarters of Abraham Beame's unsuccessful mayoral campaign. By the late 1960s, aluminum panels had been installed on the Lexington Avenue elevation. Harrison A. Hartman Jr. was appointed as the hotel's new general manager in 1967.

In the 1980s, the ground floor contained a restaurant called Maude's. The hotel hosted events such as dog shows and the Cavendish Invitational Pairs bridge tournament. By the end of this decade, the Summit sought to attract business travelers, and it started providing free continental breakfasts to corporate guests. During that time, the southern portion of the entrance plaza was replaced with a curved, dark-red storefront. In addition, a small annex was built in front of the northern portion of the entrance plaza. Loew's then began renovating the hotel for $26 million. In 1990, the Lexington Avenue Grill opened in the ground-story space formerly occupied by Maude's. The hotel became the Loews New York Hotel in 1991.

Under the leadership of Loews Hotels CEO Jonathan M. Tisch, the hotel underwent a $17 million renovation starting in 2000. The blue-green facade was restored, and the lobby (redesigned in the Art Deco style in the 1990s) was redone in a "cheerful Coffee-Shop Modern" style. In addition, the hotel was renamed the Metropolitan, and the sign on Lexington Avenue was modified to accommodate the new name.

=== DoubleTree operation ===
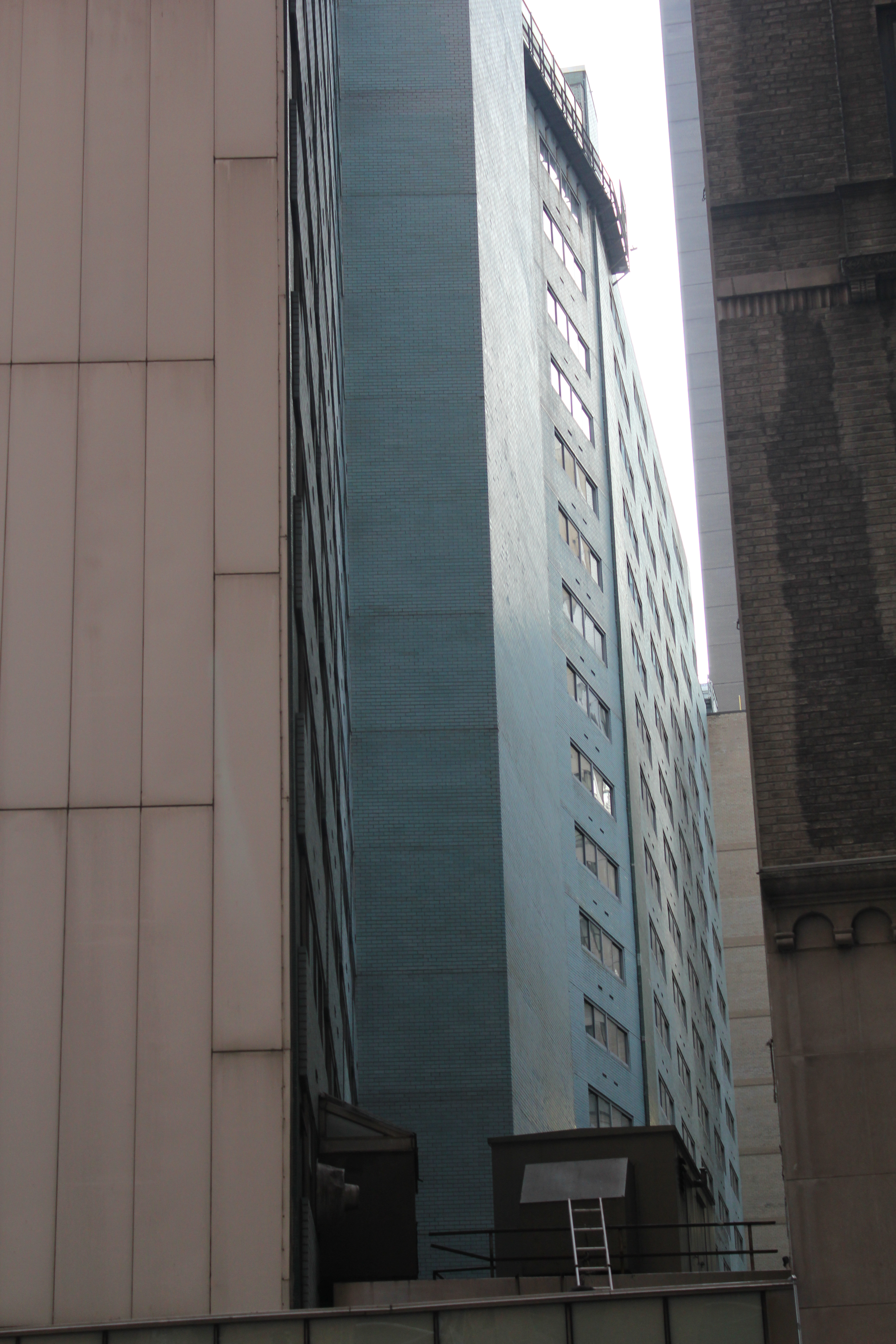
Southern facade as seen from Lexington Avenue

A joint venture of Highgate Holdings, Whitehall Real Estate Funds (owned by Goldman Sachs), and Rockwood Capital LLC bought the hotel in July 2003. The hotel cost $122 million in total, or $166,667 per room. The new owners initially intended to spend $22 million on renovations but ultimately spent $35 million. At the time, business travel was recovering from a downturn that followed the September 11 attacks. The joint venture did not intend to change the Metropolitan Hotel's facade, but they did renovate all the rooms, as well as the bar, restaurant, windows, and penthouse. The renovation took place in phases, with 500 rooms remaining in operation at any given time. The owners expanded the Metropolitan from 732 to 755 rooms by splitting some large suites.

The hotel reopened on January 26, 2005, as part of the DoubleTree hotel chain; it was renamed yet again to the DoubleTree Metropolitan Hotel. At the time, the windows were still being replaced, and work on the lobby and penthouse was ongoing. Some preservationists expressed concern that Lapidus's 1960s design would be significantly altered. In response, the New York City Landmarks Preservation Commission designated the DoubleTree Metropolitan Hotel as a landmark in 2005. RLJ Lodging Trust acquired the DoubleTree by Hilton Metropolitan in 2011, paying $135 million in cash and assuming an existing $200 million mortgage. Highgate Holdings continued to operate the hotel. RLJ spent another $25 million on renovating the hotel, redecorating all rooms with geometric motifs based on Lapidus's original design.

The DoubleTree Metropolitan closed permanently in 2020 during the COVID-19 pandemic in New York City. In January 2022, Hawkins Way Capital bought the DoubleTree Metropolitan from RLJ Lodging Trust for $146 million, less than half what RLJ had paid for it. The sale price amounted to $221,000 a room. By then, tourism in New York City had suffered due to the pandemic. amid a citywide migrant housing crisis caused by an influx of asylum seekers in mid-2022, city officials considered converting the DoubleTree Metropolitan into temporary housing for asylum seekers.

=== Conversion to dormitory ===
The hotel remained closed in late 2022, even as the number of hotel rooms in the city had returned to 92 percent of pre-pandemic levels. A student dormitory, Found Study, opened at the building in late 2022. Female students living at the Webster Apartments in Hudson Yards, Manhattan, were relocated to 569 Lexington Avenue. In addition, the City University of New York (CUNY) leased dormitory space at the building during the redevelopment of its Brookdale campus in Kips Bay, Manhattan. CUNY bought 578 of the building's dorm rooms for $86 million in April 2025, and it paid another $125 million for six stories of the building that August.

== Critical reception and impact ==
When the Summit Hotel opened, The New York Times described the hotel as having "brought the glitter and modernity of Miami Beach into Midtown Manhattan". Reception was generally negative; Lapidus said it was "the most hated hotel in New York". The Times wrote that the Summit's "curved sea-foam-blue facade and a sign straight out of The Jetsons" made it an object of derision. Ada Louise Huxtable believed the Summit was "a glittering display of gaudy confusion" and that its colorful design could not conceal the hotel's "small spaces and hard-headed economies". Walter McQuade of The Nation said the Summit was "too far from the beach". Another critic, Russell Lynes, said: "We are snobbishly intolerant in New York of the subculture of Florida". Lynes criticized the hotel's facade as having an "underwater" appearance, and he thought the vertical sign befitted "any motel on the road from Dallas to Fort Worth or any bowling alley in Paramus, N.J.". Time magazine called the interior a mixture of "Bronx baroque and Mexicali modrun"; on the other hand, "if judicious use of space is indeed essential, the Summit rates high."

Criticism of the building's shape was more mixed. McQuade characterized the Summit Hotel as a "prime example of the Miami Beach style" as exemplified by its shape. Time said the "S" shape was a "welcome change from Manhattan’s orange-crate regularity", even though the magazine's critic personally disliked the green facade. By contrast, Chatham Green, an S-shaped apartment building in Chinatown, was better received. This led Lapidus to say: "So a snake dance on Lexington Avenue is not satisfactory, while the one on Chatham Square is all right. Frankly, these barbs hurt." In the 1980s, Carter Horsley of The New York Times characterized the Summit, along with the Socony-Mobil Building and Citicorp Center, as one of several buildings on Lexington Avenue with "glitter, color, and modernity". Herbert Muschamp claimed in 2002 that some of the criticism may have been motivated by bigotry, saying: "I suspect that for many who liked the Summit, including myself, the Jewishness, not the ersatz South Americana, helped account for the appeal."

According to Lapidus, postmodernist architect Philip Johnson was the only person willing to defend the design. Johnson said: "Well, I went into the lobby and looked around and I counted 27 different colors. Anyone who can use 27 different colors in one room is worth watching." Olga Guelft of Interiors magazine said the hotel was "an important addition to the New York scene and perhaps to the whole American scene", but even she believed Lapidus's "frantic effort to confuse the eye" resulted in confusion. Near the end of his life, Lapidus said of the hotel: "New Yorkers couldn't stand it because I used so much color. People here like things gray." In spite of this, Lapidus said the hotel was successful, calling it his most significant project in New York City. The roof of the hotel was also used as a filming location for the 2007 film Spider-Man 3.

== See also ==
- List of New York City Designated Landmarks in Manhattan from 14th to 59th Streets
