= Stash Hotel Rewards =

American company that produces a loyalty rewards program

- Type: Private
- Industry: Loyalty rewards; Hospitality
- Founded: 2010
- Headquarters: Palo Alto, California, U.S.
- Area served: North America
- Key people: Jeff Low (founder & CEO)
- Products: Loyalty program for independent hotels
- Website: www.stashrewards.com

Stash Hotel Rewards is an American company that produces a loyalty rewards program for a network of over 300 independent hotels in the United States, Panama, and the Caribbean. The membership is free to join, and guests are given 5 points for every dollar spent at hotels in the network. It is the largest points-based loyalty reward program for independent hotels in North America. The company was founded in 2010 and is based in Palo Alto, California.

== History ==
The company was founded in May 2010 in Palo Alto, California by former Expedia executive, Jeff Low (who also serves as the company's CEO). Low had previously been responsible for the creation of Expedia's "Thank You" rewards program. At its outset, Stash had enlisted 65 hotels (including boutiques, spas, and resorts) in 50 cities mostly across the United States. By August, those numbers had increased to 79 hotels in 63 cities including Boston, San Francisco, New York City, Los Angeles, Chicago, and others. In 2024, the network included over 300 properties.

In early 2014, Stash became the largest loyalty reward program for independent hotels in North America. It also began fostering a larger presence in the Caribbean. In January 2014, a study conducted by researchers from Cornell University, Ithaca College, and Michigan State University showed that hoteliers who had enrolled in the Stash Hotel Rewards program saw an average increase of incremental revenue between $400,000 and $780,000 annually.

== Operation ==
Stash Hotel Rewards' main product offering is a loyalty reward program for a network of nearly 200 independent hotels in the United States (including Hawaii and Puerto Rico), Canada, Mexico, Panama, and the Caribbean. It is free to sign up for the program, and guests who enroll are awarded 5 points for every dollar spent at in-network hotels. Those points can then be redeemed for a free stay at any in-network hotel, and there are no blackout or expiration dates. Stash differs from most traditional loyalty programs in that it allows individual properties to set the number of points required to redeem a free night. For instance, a hotel in-season may increase the number of points required to redeem a free stay while an out-of-season hotel may decrease the number.

In 2015, Stash launched the Stash Hotel Rewards Visa Card. The card was developed in association with Synchrony Financial. In May 2018, Stash filed a lawsuit against Synchrony in California for breach of contract and fraudulent misrepresentation. The card was discontinued in 2018.
